= Pensioner Guard Cottage =

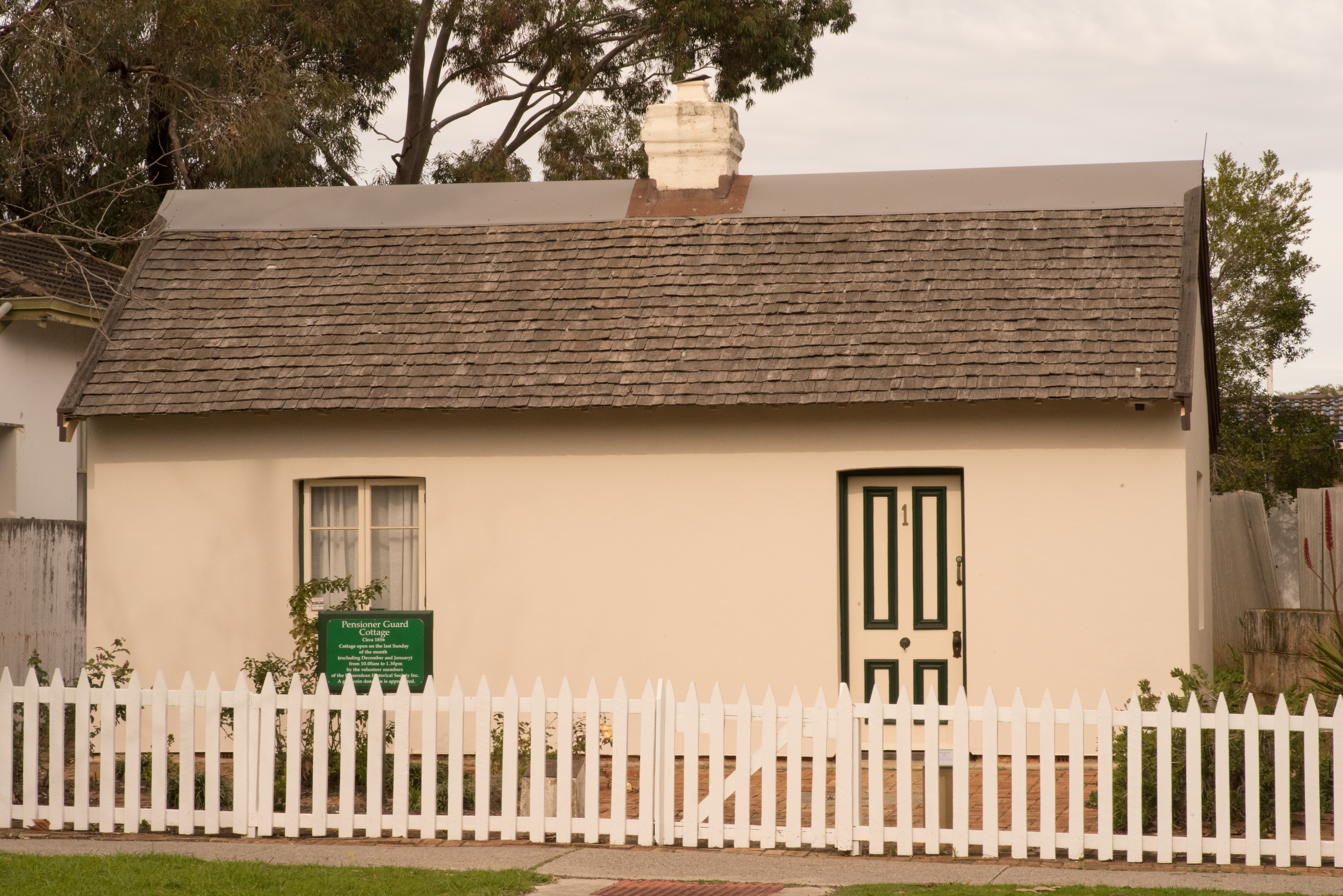
- Pensioner Guard Cottage in July 2020
- Interactive map of the Pensioner Guard Cottage area

General information
- Type: Heritage listed building
- Location: 1 Surrey Street, Bassendean, Western Australia
- Coordinates: 31.904614°S 115.959202°E
- Completed: c. 1856
- Owner: Museum of Perth

Western Australia Heritage Register
- Type: State Registered Place
- Designated: 30 September 1994
- Reference no.: 131

The Pensioner Guard Cottage is a historic building in the Perth suburb of Bassendean, Western Australia. It is the oldest building in Bassendean, built between 1855 and 1857 by ticket of leave convicts staying at the Guildford convict depot. It was built with a group of three other similar cottages in Bassendean whose purpose was to house Pensioner Guards. In 1893, a house was built adjacent to the cottage. The other three cottages were demolished during the first half of the 20th century, and the house was significantly expanded in 1952.

The land was purchased by the Town of Bassendean in 1988 for the cottage and adjacent house to be restored and made into a museum. Since restoration was completed in 1993, it has been used as a museum operated by the Bassendean Historical Society. In 1994, the cottage and house were placed on the State Register of Heritage Places. In 2021, the land was sold to Perth History Association Inc, also known as Museum of Perth, a not-for-profit organisation founded in 2015. The sale of the Pensioner Guard Cottage created public disagreement among some members of the Bassendean community.

== History ==
Pensioner Guards were British army veterans who had completed their period of service or were wounded, and received a pension. They served on convict transportation ships to Western Australia. Part of their role in the colony was to help maintain law and order, and serve as a presence of authority in towns with a convict depot. On the outskirts of convict depot towns, Pensioner Guard settlements were built. The Pensioners worked on the land and supported themselves, living in two roomed cottages built by convicts or ticket of leave men. The Pensioners could gain ownership of their cottage and land if they stay and work there for seven years. A total of 59 cottages were built by the end of 1862.

One such town was Guildford, which had a ticket of leave depot. It was planned that 12 cottages be built in Bassendean, known then as West Guildford. Only four were built though, with shortages in labour and equipment possibly the reason. They were situated on lots 114 to 117. The construction was organised by Edmund Frederick Du Cane. In August 1855, Du Cane wrote in a report that 67 ticket of leave men were occupied with burning bricks and sawing timber for the cottages. In January 1856, Du Cane wrote that construction was progressing on the first three cottages. In February 1857, Du Cane noted that the four cottages were completed, however there were still works being carried out later that year.

John Law Davis was a Pensioner Guard who arrived in Western Australia in 1853, aged 26 years old. On 27 November 1857, he was appointed caretaker of the four cottages, still unoccupied at the time. He lived in the cottage on lot 114. The other cottages were taken up by Henry Chartres, James Brown and William Oliver in 1858. Brown was the only one who was not a Pensioner Guard. The Pensioner Guards obtained ownership of their cottages in 1865 and 1865. Davis died on 7 June 1870, and his eldest son William inherited the cottage. Since William was only 13 years old, Davis's wife Amelia was the executor of Davis's estate. Amelia remarried to John Bates, and they continued to live in the cottage. William later moved out to find work, eventually moving to New South Wales.

In 1893, William sold lot 114 to Edmund Ralph Brockman for £160. Amelia received ten shillings as executor of the estate. Brockman then sold the property to his daughter Frances Jane Brown and her husband Aubrey Brown. Either Brockman or the Browns built a separate, five room bungalow-style house next to the cottage in 1893, the two building linked by a verandah. Aubrey Brown died in 1909, and Frances Brown sold the lot in 1915. Between 1915 and 1945, the lot changed hands several times. By the 1930s, only the cottages on lots 114 and 115 were left, and by 1947, only the cottage on lot 114 was left.

During the housing shortage post-World War II, the building was made into a boarding house. The 1893 house was significantly expanded in the early 1950s, after the 1952 removal of post-war building material restrictions. At some stage, likely at the same time, the roof of the building was rebuilt. The lot continued to change hands several times during the 1960s to the 1980s.

In the 1970s, the 2-acre (0.81 ha) lot that the cottage was situated on was subdivided. It was further subdivided in 1988, and the Town of Bassendean bought the land with the cottage and 1893 residence. The intention was to restore and renovate the buildings to use as a museum. The restoration works were funded by the Town of Bassendean and the National Estate Grants Program of 1989–1990. They occurred between 1991 and 1993, during which, the verandah connecting the two buildings was removed, and various parts of the cottage were reverted to their original state, such as the floor level, which had been raised at some point. The restored cottage was opened in 1993 by John Cox, the mayor of Bassendean, and John Addison, president of the Bassendean Historical Society (BHS). An agreement was agreed to between the BHS and the Town of Bassendean that saw the BHS maintain the cottage and adjacent house as a museum. Since then, the cottage has been opened to visitors regularly, generally on the last Sunday of each month.

=== Sale controversy ===
During 2021, the Town of Bassendean decided to sell the Pensioner Guard Cottage because it could not afford to repair and maintain it. The Museum of Perth and the BHS were the two groups that bid to buy the site. The BHS opposed selling the site to the Museum of Perth because it was worried that the land would be subdivided if that occurred. BHS president Mark Johnson said "The property now publicly owned by the people of Bassendean will, when given to the MoP, become private property." In July 2021, the council sold the site to the Museum of Perth for $1.

== Heritage listing ==
The Pensioner Guard Cottage is listed on the State Register of Heritage Places due to its "high degree of historic significance as a demonstration of how, and where, Pensioner Guards lived". It is also the only remaining Pensioner Guard cottage in the Perth metropolitan area. It was placed on the State Register in September 1994, having been placed on the register of the National Trust of Western Australia in March 1987.

== Design ==
The cottage is a rectangular, two-room brick building. It has influences from the Victorian and Georgian architectural styles, in the "gentleness of scale, simple rectangular form and symmetrical facades, and traditional bearing walls".

The adjacent house's design displays influences from the Federation Bungalow architectural style.

== See also ==
- List of State Register of Heritage Places in the Town of Bassendean
- Hackett's (Pensioner) Cottage
- Kirk's (Pensioner) Cottage
