= Bassendean Fire Station =

Former fire station in Bassendean, Western Australia

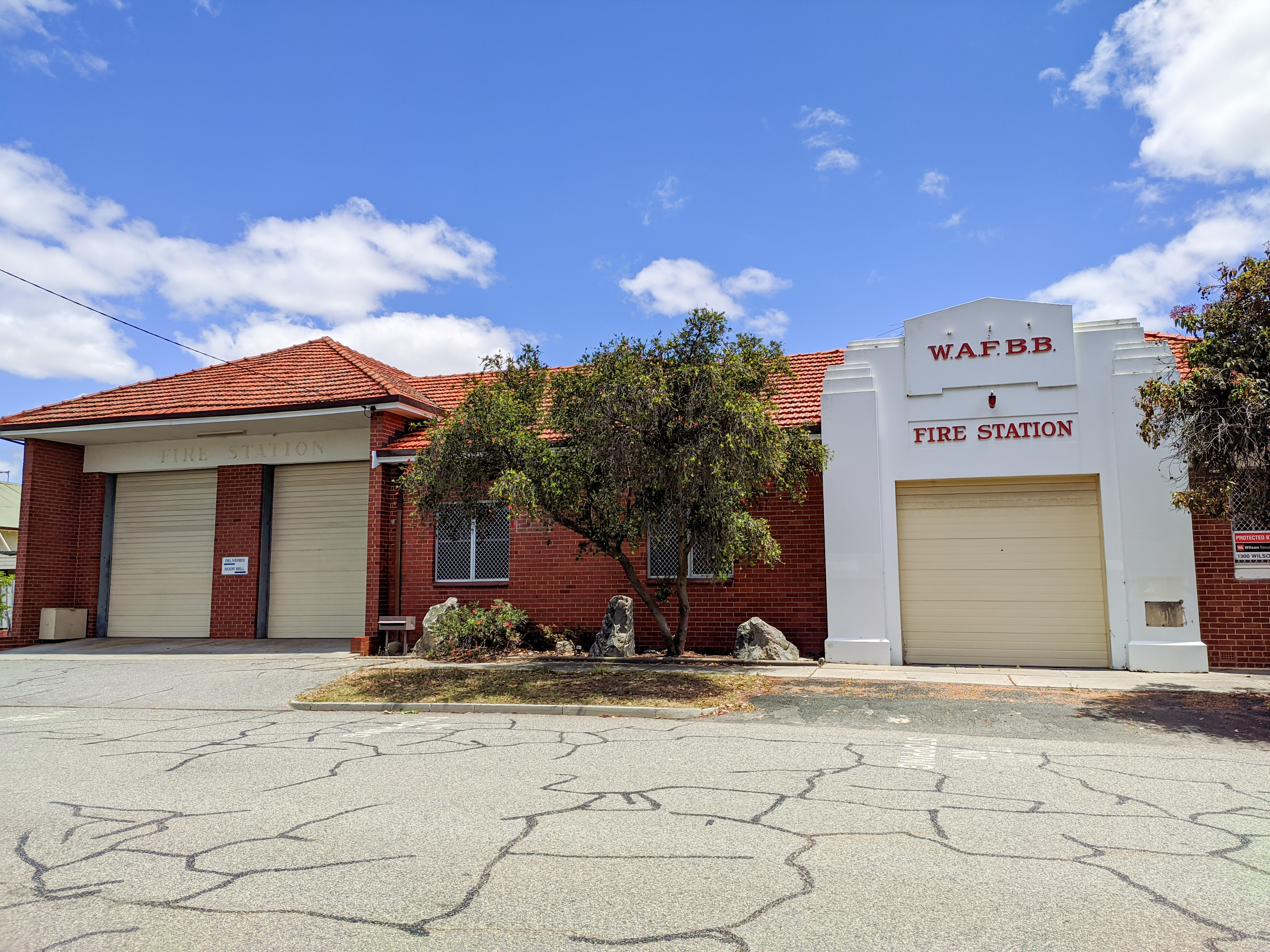

- Location within Perth
- 31.905046°S 115.947777°E
- Location: 10-14 Parker St., Bassendean, Western Australia

Western Australia Heritage Register
- Type: State Registered Place
- Designated: 9 February 2016
- Reference no.: 129

Bassendean Fire Station is a historic fire station in Bassendean, Western Australia.

It is a one-storey brick and tile building, with elements of Inter-War Stripped Classical architecture styling, from its construction in 1934 and expansion in 1969–71. The listing included outbuildings and a ladder training tower at the rear.

The station closed in 2013, after the Department of Fire and Emergency Services moved services to Kiara.

It was listed by the Heritage Council on the State Register of Western Australia.

== See also ==
- List of State Register of Heritage Places in the Town of Bassendean
