= Robert Bropho =

Australian Aboriginal acrivist (1930–2011)

- Born: Robert Charles Bropho; 9 February 1930; Toodyay, Western Australia
- Died: 24 October 2011 (aged 81); Perth, Western Australia
- Spouse: Bella Bropho
- Children: 2
- Status: Deceased
- Conviction: Five charges of unlawful carnal knowledge of a girl under 13 years.
- Penalty: Six years' imprisonment

Robert Charles Bropho (9 February 1930 – 24 October 2011) was a Ballardong Noongar Australian Aboriginal, rights activist and convicted serial child sex offender from Perth, Western Australia.

Bropho was leader of the Swan Valley Nyungah Community settlement for over 40 years until its closure in 2003. He organised the protest against redevelopment of the Swan Brewery, and was involved in the repatriation of Yagan's head in 1997. He was convicted for child sex charges in 2008. He died in October 2011 while serving a six-year jail term.

== Childhood ==
Bropho was born in a bush camp at the back of the Coorinjie wine saloon at Toodyay, Western Australia, on 9 February 1930. His mother was Isobel Layland (1900–1993), who was the daughter of Clara Layland, a Nyungah woman who lived in the swamps on the fringes of Perth. His father was Tommy Nyinda Bropho (1899–1972), who was born at Argyle Downs Station on the Durack pastoral lease and was taken from his mother under the 1905 Aborigines Act and sent to an orphanage on the Swan River at the age of 7. It is believed he was named after a policeman called Brophy, who escorted him from Argyle Downs to Wyndham. Tommy's sister Jessie Argyle was the subject of the book Shadow Lines by Steve Kinnane.

The oral history of Bropho's mother Isobel is available in the Battye Library. She spent her childhood in the Dulhi Gunyah orphanage in East Victoria Park.

During the 1930s Bropho, his parents and eleven siblings camped in a swamp at Swanbourne in the western suburbs of Perth. After being forced to vacate their camp, Bropho's family relocated to Eden Hill in the late 1930s. His family spent the next decade living in humpies on the edge of John Forrest National Park and around the rubbish dumps and swamps and waterways of South Guildford, Caversham and Success Hill. They survived by working in the brick kilns, carting rubbish and sewage and picking grapes. Success Hill, on the edge of Bennett Brook, was a traditional campsite and was where the Irish journalist and amateur anthropologist Daisy Bates gathered information for her books and articles on Nyungah culture.

== Activism ==
On 11 September 1977 Bropho, his family and members of the Anderson, Mead and Kickett families drove 3,000 kilometres (1,900 mi) across the continent of Australia to petition the Federal Indigenous Affairs Minister Ian Viner for better housing conditions. On their return the Bropho family set up a public protest camp in the grounds of St Matthew's Anglican Church in Guildford, a registered Aboriginal site.

On 11 December 1978 Bropho and members of the Lockridge Camp set up a protest on Heirisson Island as the City of Perth prepared for its 150th anniversary. The protest was supported by the Kimberley Land Council, the Aboriginal Medical Service and Black Action.

In 1980 Bropho published Fringedweller, an account of the third world living conditions of homeless Aboriginal people.

During the 1980s Bropho was involved in protests against mining and urban development, including Noonkanbah and Bennett Brook. In 1986 he won a Supreme Court injunction against plans by the State Energy Commission to excavate a sacred site at Bennett Brook.

=== Old Swan Brewery protest ===
In January 1989 Bropho led a protest against the State Government's deal with Multiplex to develop on a sacred Aboriginal site at the Old Swan Brewery on Mounts Bay Road. Bropho challenged the development in the Supreme Court of Western Australia, which held that the Aboriginal Heritage Act 1972-1980 did not apply to the state government. Bropho then successfully appealed to the High Court of Australia in Bropho v Western Australia (1990).

== Swan Valley Nyungah Community ==
Bropho led the Swan Valley Nyungah Community from 1963 to 2003. The community was the subject of a coronial inquest and the Gordon Inquiry in 2001. The community was closed in 2003 by an Act of Parliament after widespread allegations of rape, sexual abuse, family violence and substance abuse.

== Convictions ==
In 2003, Bropho was charged with raping Lena Spratt in 1975. His niece, Susan Taylor, committed suicide in 2001. The court was told during the trial that Bropho had offered Taylor and other girls money for sex before her death.

In 2005, four years after the girls came forward at Taylor's inquest, he was found guilty of three counts of indecently dealing with a young girl at the camp, and was jailed for 12 months.

In 2008, he was found guilty of five counts of carnal knowledge of a girl under 13, to whom he began giving money for sex when she was 11 years old at the height of the Swan Brewery legal battle in 1990. Bropho was sentenced to three years' jail. The sentence was later doubled after an appeal by the Director of Public Prosecutions. Judge Peter Nisbet described his crimes as the "lowest form of abuse imaginable". Bropho told the court "I am the shadow of Martin Luther King and Gandhi."

== Death ==
Bropho had a number of severe health problems when convicted and was listed as a terminally ill prisoner in 2010. He died from a heart attack on 24 October 2011 at Royal Perth Hospital, while still serving his jail term. His death was the subject of a coronial inquiry as it occurred in custody.

== See also ==
- Select Committee on Reserves (Reserve 43131) Bill 2003
