= John Acton Wroth =

English convict transported to Australia

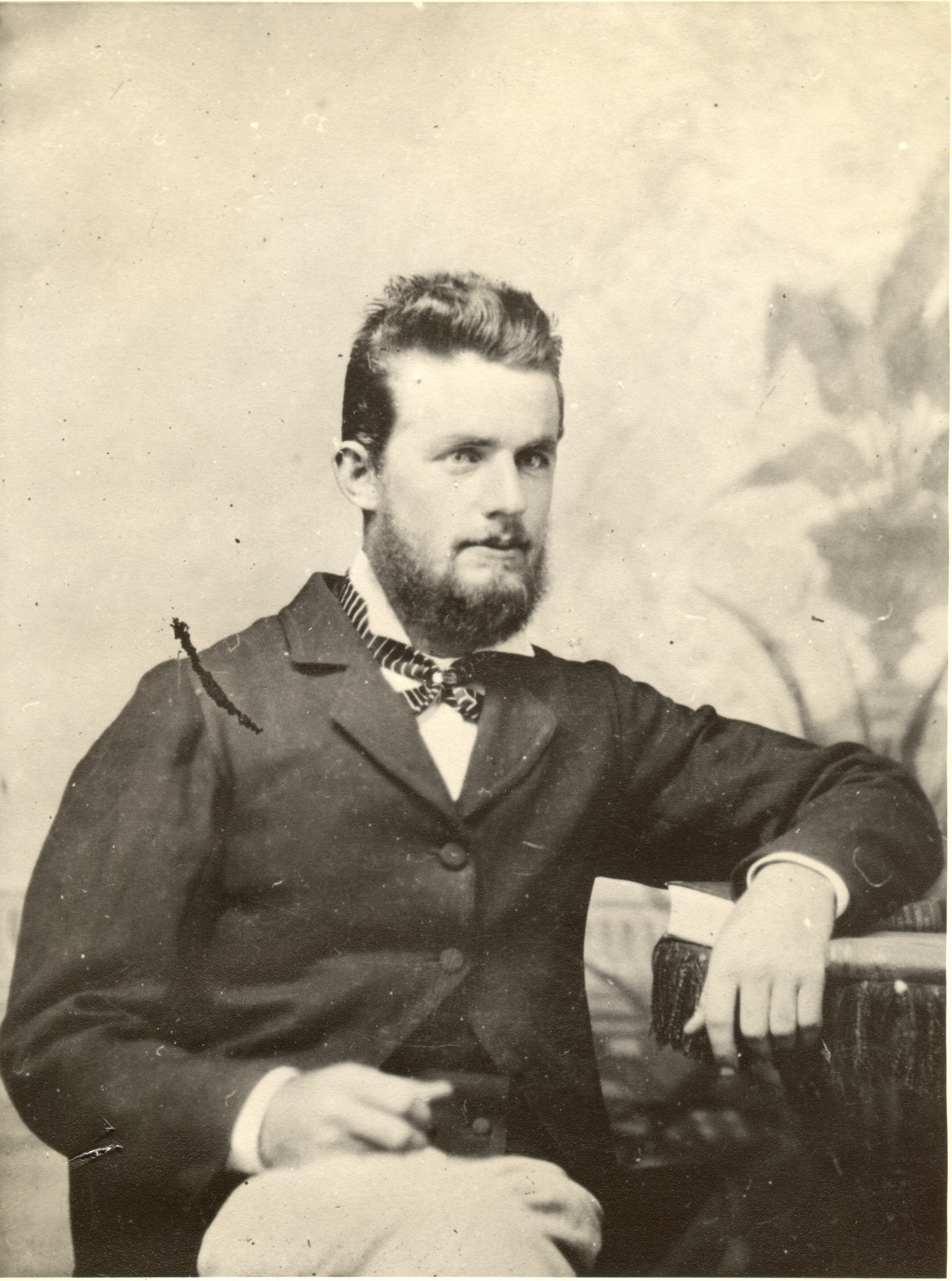
Studio portrait of Wroth

John Acton Wroth (1830–1876) was a convict transportee to the Swan River Colony, and later a clerk and storekeeper in Toodyay, Western Australia. He kept a personal diary that recorded life on board the transport ship and his experiences at the country hiring depots of York and Toodyay. This diary is lodged in the archives of the State Library.

== Early life ==
Wroth's birth was registered on 17 December 1830 at St Mary at the Quay Church, Ipswich. He was the only son of John, a brewer, and his wife Elizabeth (née Reeves) who died in 1845. There were four older sisters. When Wroth was 17 years old, he was apprenticed to Stephen Piper, a printer in the town of Ipswich. He became enamoured of young girl, Elvina Gartlett, who became the object of his love. He may have wanted to impress upon Gartlett that he was a fashionable young man and to this end he sought means to acquire a gold watch and chain, and a pair of expensive boots. He not only forged orders on behalf of local jewellers and a bootmaker, he also stole a large quantity of stationery from his employer. The fraud was detected and Wroth was charged at the Ipswich Court in August 1848. He was sentenced to transportation for ten years for forging an order for goods, but first he had to spend nine months in solitary confinement, then time in the new Parkhurst gaol for juvenile offenders. (Note: Erickson states that Wroth went before Judge Baron Parke "who in 1834 sentenced the six Tolpuddle martyrs to transportation to NSW for forming a trade union". This could not be verified at the time of writing.)

Wroth's family supplied him with items that he would need in his new life, including an exercise book that he used as a diary, describing shipboard life in detail. He made a sketch of the ship and its fittings, and described what the convicts wore and ate. He also practised his shorthand, which would serve him well in his future life in the colony.

== Swan River Colony and York ==
Wroth was transported to the Swan River Colony on Mermaid with over 200 other convicts and a contingent of Pensioner Guards and their families. They included Francis Kirk, who was posted to Toodyay. Wroth was described at the time as 20 years of age, 5 feet 6 inches (168 cm) tall, with brown hair and grey eyes. On the voyage out he was given the role of school assistant.

Following his arrival at Fremantle in May 1851 Wroth was sent to the York Convict Hiring Depot as a probationer prisoner working as a clerk. He received his ticket-of-leave on 28 November 1851. All this time Wroth had maintained his hopes for a future with Gartlett but she never reciprocated his attempts to contact her. In York his affections turned to John Smithies' young daughter, who wanted to elope with him. On discovering this, Smithies accused Wroth of planning to abduct his daughter, resulting in Wroth's transfer to Fremantle. The comptroller-general, probably realising no harm had been done, granted him a conditional pardon in 1853.

== Toodyay ==
In March 1854 Wroth was sent to the Toodyay Hiring Depot, where he was appointed clerk of courts. Wroth's shorthand proved useful in recording the court proceedings. Resident magistrate Joseph Strelley Harris also paid Wroth from his own salary to be his personal clerk. James Drummond, a leading pastoralist in Toodyay, also had need of Wroth's clerical skills. Drummond leased one of his cottages at Mill Farm to Wroth, who now felt he was in a position to support a wife and family.

In June 1854 Wroth married Bridget Josephine Ellis, a recent arrival at the Depot. Ellis was one of the emigrant girls brought out on the so-called "bride ships" to redress the shortage of young women in the colony. They went into service as servant girls and became potential brides for single men, both bond and free. The couple had five sons and a daughter. Wroth was an Anglican, but Bridget was Catholic; the couple agreed the sons would be Anglican, while the daughter would be brought up in her mother's faith. Their third son, Joseph Ablett Wroth (born in 1859), became a long serving and highly respected town clerk for the Municipality of Newcastle.

With a growing family to care for, Wroth was constantly on the lookout for ways to supplement his income. He undertook private clerical work, did accounting for farmers, wrote and read letters for the illiterate, and worked as a postmaster. He also worked for a time as clerk for the Agricultural Society. In 1858 he was working in the store set up by Drummond. This was strategically placed on the road between the town of Toodyay and the pensioner village at the now closed Hiring Depot, and the junction of the road that went north through the Toodyay Valley to Victoria Plains and Champion Bay. This region was being opened up for the pastoral industry.

In 1860 the pensioner village and former Depot became the nucleus of the new town of Newcastle. The town of Toodyay was subject to periodic flooding and the decision was made to create a new town further upstream on the higher ground of the Depot site. In 1862 Governor John Hampton arrived and ordered the Convict Hiring Depots to be re-opened. This was a boon to Wroth when he won the commissariat contract to provide provisions for the convict road parties. By then he also had a butchering business.

Wroth was also involved with teaching. For a time he ran an evening school in Newcastle, before taking on the temporary role of teacher of his own children and those of Drummond's workmen until a government schoolmaster could be appointed. Drummond provided a cottage near his steam mill and this became known as the Steam Mill School. From 1871 to 1876 Wroth served as the first secretary of the Toodyay Education Board. He was also appointed to the Toodyay Road Board to undertake clerical work.

Wroth contracted typhoid resulting in his death on 30 July 1876. His memory and contribution to Western Australia are honoured in one of the plaques laid down in St Georges Terrace as part of the state's 150th birthday celebrations.
