= 1986 Queen's Birthday Honours (Australia) =

Awards list for Australia

The 1986 Queen's Birthday Honours for Australia were announced on Monday 9 June 1986 by the office of the Governor-General.

The Birthday Honours were appointments by some of the 16 Commonwealth realms of Queen Elizabeth II to various orders and honours to reward and highlight good works by citizens of those countries. The Birthday Honours are awarded as part of the Queen's Official Birthday celebrations during the month of June.

== Order of Australia ==
=== Companion (AC) ===
==== General Division ====
Recipient	Citation	Notes
Sir Hermann Black	For service to learning, education and to public affairs	
Emeritus Professor Robert Hanbury Brown	For service to science, particularly in the field of stellar astronomy	
Sir Robert Gillman Allen Jackson, KCVO CMG OBE	For service to international relations, particularly as Under Secretary-General and Special Adviser to the United Nations Organisation	
Robert Alan Johnston	For service to banking particularly as Governor of the Reserve Bank	
Sir James (Charles) McNeill, CBE	For distinguished service to the State of Victoria through industry	
His Excellency Professor Gordon Stanley Reid	For public service, for service to learning and to the Crown	

==== Military Division ====
Branch	Recipient	Citation	Notes
Air Force	Air Marshal John William Newham, AO	For service to the Royal Australian Air Force, particularly as Chief of the Air Staff	

=== Officer (AO) ===
==== General Division ====
Recipient	Citation	Notes
Dr Jean Anges Battersby	For service to the arts and to public service	
Dr Norman Gregory Joseph Behan, CMG	For service to the arts, particularly to the Queensland Art Gallery	
Emeritus Professor Lindsay Michael Birt, CBE	For service to education	
Alexander Carmichael, CBE	For service to public service and commerce	
Hector William Crawford, CBE	For service to Australian television production	
David Frederick Dallwitz	For service to music, particularly in the field of jazz	
George Francis Davies, CMG	For service to the media and to the community	
Emeritus Professor Austin Eric Doyle	For service to medical teaching and research	
Anthony Murray Gleeson, QC	For service to the law and to the Crown	
William Graham Gosewinckel	For public service, particularly as general manager of AUSSAT	
Professor Fred Henry George Gruen	For service to education, particularly in the field of economics	
Kenneth George Hall, OBE	For service to medicine, particularly as a cardiologist	
The Reverend Vernon Henry Harrison	For service to the community, particularly in the field of aged care	
Robert Merry Hillman	For public service, particularly in the field of engineering	
Emeritus Professor Frederic Raphael Jevons	For service to learning, particularly in the field of distance education	
Kenneth Norman Jones, CBE	For public service, particularly in the fields of education and departmental administration	
Brenton James Langbein	For service to music particularly as violinist, orchestral conductor and teacher	
Max Leon Liberman	For service to the housing industry	
Chesborough Ranald Macdonald	For service to the community, particularly as chairman of Victoria's 150th anniversary celebrations	
Ronald Holland Martin	For service to the wheat industry	
Professor James Graham McLeod	For service to medicine, particularly in the field of neurology	
Chief Commissioner Sinclair Imrie Miller, LVO QPM	For public service, particularly with the Victoria Police Force	
Emeritus Professor John Derrick Ovington	For service to conservation, particularly as director, national parks and wildlife service	
Keith Francis Parry	For service to the mineral industry, particularly in the field of gold mining	
His Excellency Alfred Roy Parsons	For public service as a diplomatic representative	
Wallace Keith Pilz, OBE	For public service, particularly as director, New South Wales Public Works Department	
Leonard Ian Roach	For service to commerce and to the community	
Dr Alan Geoffrey Serle	For service to scholarship and literature, particularly in the field of Australian history	
John William Shaw, OBE	For service to opera	
Dr Warwick Sydney Lees Stening	For service in the field of medical education	
The Honourable Justice John Leslie Toohey	For service to the community, particularly as Northern Territory Aboriginal Land Commissioner	
John Webber Venn	For public service to residential neighbourhood design with the National Capital Development Commission.	
The Honourable Justice Howard Edgar Zelling, CBE QC	For service to the community and the law, particularly as Chairman of the South Australian Law Reform Committee	

==== Military Division ====
Branch	Recipient	Citation	Notes
Navy	Rear Admiral Ronald Rex Calder, AM	For service to the Royal Australian Navy, particularly as Chief of Naval Engineering	
Army	Major General Adrian Clunies-Ross, MBE	For service to the Australian Army as Commander 1st Division	
Army	Major General Keith Henry Kirkland, CBE	For service to the Australian Army as General Officer Commanding Training Command	
Air Force	Air Vice Marshal Douglas George Cameron, AFC	For service to the Royal Australian Air Force as Commander of the Integrated Air Defence System	
Air Force	Air Vice Marshal William Henry Simmonds	For service to the Royal Australian Air Force as Chief of Air Force Development	

=== Member (AM) ===
==== General Division ====
Recipient	Citation	Notes
Betty Margaret Andersen	For service to nursing education	
Jurek Kazimierz Andrecki	For service to the community, particularly the Polish community	
Russell William Arland	For service to the local government	
Ian Harry Backler	For service to the fishing industry	
Alan Richard Bagnall	For service to the Australian Bureau of Statistics	
Frank John Ball, AFC	For service to civil aviation, particularly as General Manager of Trans Australia Airlines	
Victor Colin Belsham	For service to the sport of squash	
James Duncan Bennett, OBE	For service to the community and local government	
Frederick Nils Bennett	For service to the public service, particularly in the fields of industry and defence	
Shirley Stanton Berg	For service to education	
Dr Victor Blackman	For service to medicine, particularly in the field of pathology	
Malcolm Jack Blight	For service to Australian football	
Allan Robert Border	For service to the sport of cricket	
Kenneth Robert John Boylan	For service to health administration	
The Honourable Cecil George Brettingham-Moore, MC	For service to the community	
Dr John Peter Bush	For service to the community and medicine	
John Laurence Carroll	For service to the public service in the field of finance and for service to public speaking through Rostrum	
Wendy Jennifer Chapman	For service to the community and local government	
Donald Coburn	For service to the welfare of the aged	
David Murray Coleman	For service to communications, particularly through Telecom	
Dr Clive Keith Coogan	For service to science and to the Commonwealth Scientific and Industrial Research Organisation	
Rosemary Crossley	For service to those with severe communication disabilities	
Lindsay James Curtis	For service to the public service, particularly to the Attorney-General's Department	
Dr Brian Forster Dickens, OBE	For service to the mentally and physically impaired	
William John Draper	For service to journalism and to the community, particularly as the editor of Who's Who in Australia	
Dr Leslie Raymond Hill Drew	For service to the public, particularly in the treatment of alcohol and drug dependence	
John James Duncan	For service to the Royal Agricultural and Horticultural Society of South Australia	
Milo Kanangra Dunphy	For service to conservation	
Allan Millsteed Eddy	For service to the sport of lawn bowls and to the community	
Dr Eva Gizella Eden	For service to education	
Mabel Edmund	For service to the Aboriginal community	
Jonathan George Wycombe Erby	For service to the community and to architecture	
Patrick Ambrose Farnan	For service to international trade	
Professor Peter James Fensham	For service to the community and to education	
Professor David Alexander Ferguson	For service to medicine, particularly in the field of occupational and environmental health	
Norman William Frederick Fisher	For service in the fields of labour market research and public administration	
Alec Fong Lim	For service to the community and to local government	
Glenys Rae Fowles	For service to opera	
Millicent Daisy Fox	For service to the community, particularly in the field of health	
Albert Richard Gardner, MBE	For service to the community, particularly to youth	
Dr Harry William Garlick	For service to medicine, particularly in the fields of education and administration	
Ray Ginsburg	For service to community, particularly to women	
Colin Raymond Gramp	For service to wine industry technology	
Dr Ferry Grunseit	For service to medicine, particularly in the field of paediatrics	
Dr Dorothy Jean Hailes	For service to medicine, particularly in relation to women	
George Alexander Haines	For service to secondary industry	
Patricia Joan Harper	For service to the welfare of one-parent families	
John Melman Harrison, CBE	For service to art	
Dr Arthur George Harrold	For service to conservation, particularly in Queensland	
Elaine Alys Haxton	For service to arts, particularly printmaking	
Douglas John Hill	For service to public sector accounting and to hockey	
Ian Graham Hodges	For service to those with multiple sclerosis and to youth welfare	
Geoffrey Hogan	For service to the community and to international disaster relief	
George Longworth James, ED	For service to road safety and motor transport, particularly through the National Roads and Motorists' Association	
Barbara Tarlton Jefferis	For service to literature	
The Honourable Walter Jona	For service to the community, particularly to the Jewish community	
Ronald Stanley Jordan, DFM	For service to the Australian meat industry	
Mary Veronica Joseph	For service to the community	
Cecil David Mack Jost	For service to art and music	
Eric Robert Kelly	For service to industrial relations	
Kenneth John Kelsall	For service to the engineering profession, particularly in the development of Western Australia's water resources	
Deputy Commissioner Raymond Elmo Killmier, QPM	For service with the South Australian Police Force	
Brian King	For service to local government and to the community	
Norman Edward King	For service to the community and to local government	
James Edward Layt	For service to the cement industry	
Dr Richard Bruce Lefroy	For service to medicine, particularly in the field of geriatric medicine	
Dr Robert Glendenning Linton	For service to ophthalmology	
Norman Wilson Llewelyn	For service to the performing arts	
Dr Wilfred Roy Longworth	For service to education	
Patricia Anne Lovell, MBE	For service to the film industry	
John William MacBean	For service to the trade union movement	
Isador Alexander Magid	For service to the community, particularly to the Jewish community	
John Henry Marshall	For service to sports administration, particularly to World Cup athletics	
The Reverend Dr Gilbert James McArthur	For service to the community, particularly in Papua New Guinea and the Pacific islands	
Victor Francis McCristal	For service to game fishing and to the community	
Graeme William McKinnon	For public service, particularly to the Australian exploration in the Antarctic	
Mona Menzies	For service to nursing	
Dr Jeffrey Owen Miller	For service to education	
Detective Chief Superintendent Alan James Mills	For public service with the Australian Federal Police Force	
Joan Mitchell Montgomery, OBE	For service to education	
David Charles Moore	For public service and for service to the community	
Henricus Alphonsus Maria Nederveen	For service to commerce to the Dutch community and to hockey	
Geoffrey Rowland Needham	For service to metallurgy, particularly through the Australian Foundry Institute	
Walter Derek Noble	For service to the community and to local government	
Marion Elaine Parsons	For service to the visually imparied	
Dr Robin June Parsons	For service to medicine, particularly in the field of nursing education	
Raymond Robert Frederick Pelham Thorman	For service to secondary industry, particularly through the Australian Chamber of Commerce	
Dr Grace Amelia Perry	For service to Australian literature, particularly as editor of Poetry Australia	
Roy William Osmac Pugh	For service to the community	
Lady Susan Gai Street	For service to the community, particularly in the field of health	
Margaret June Ritchie, MBE	For service to the community	
Cecil Edward Rix	For service to conservation and to ornithology	
Max John Roberts	For service to the mining industry	
Ruth Nellie Rogers	For service to early childhood education	
Alfred Ruskin	For service to the arts, particularly opera and ballet	
The Reverend Brother Walter Xavier Simmons	For service to education	
The Honourable Donald William Simmons, DFC	For service to parliament and to the community	
Keith Simpson	For service to the building industry in Western Australia	
Jack Thurston Snelson	For service to agriculture	
Walter John Stamm	For service to engineering	
Andrew Leon Tannahill	For service to the community and to the scouting movement, particularly as the inaugural Chief Commissioner, Australian Capital Territory branch	
Henry Oreste Thomas	For service to the valuation profession particularly as editor of The Valuer	
John Hadley (Jack) Thompson	For service to the film industry	
Charles Rex Threlfo	For service to the New South Wales Fire Brigade Services	
Albert Henry Tognolini	For service to engineering, particularly with the Main Roads Department of Western Australia	
Dr John Paul Tonkin	For service to medicine, particularly as an ear, nose and throat surgeon	
Dr Paolo Totaro	For service to the community, particularly to the Italian community, to arts and to education	
Augustus Schwartze Trippe	For service to industry and commerce	
Reginald Turner	For public service with the Department of Defence	
Alexander John Kerry Walker	For service to the barley industry	
Professor Russell Braddock Ward	For service to literature particularly in the field of Australian history	
Michael Weinstein, BEM	For service to soccer	
David Bruce Lynton Williams	For service to the film industry	
David Linney Wills	For service to the metal and engineering industries	
Dean Robert Wills	For service to the metal and engineering industries	
Dr Lionel Leopold Wilson	For service to medicine, particularly in the administration of health care services	
Frank Edward Yeend	For service to hockey	
Philip John Young	For service to agricultural development in Australia and in third world countries	
William John Robert Young, MBE	For service to sport, particularly through the Olympic and Commonwealth Games associations	

==== Military Division ====
Branch	Recipient	Citation	Notes
Navy	Commodore Harold John Parker Adams	For service to the Royal Australian Navy, particularly Joint Communications Electronics	
Navy	Commodore Anthony Michael Carwardine	For service to the Royal Australian Navy, particularly as Commanding Officer of HMAS Adelaide	
Navy	Commodore Malcolm Douglas Jackson	For service to the Royal Australian Navy as the Deputy Fleet Commander and Chief of Staff of Her Majesty's Australian Fleet	
Navy	Commander Robert Richards	For service to the Royal Australian Navy as the Master Attendant for the Port of Sydney	
Army	Lieutenant Colonel Kerry George Gallagher	For service to the Australian Army as Commanding Officer, 3rd Battalion, the Royal Australian Regiment	
Army	Major Dianne Margaret Garbin	For service to Australian Army financial resource management at Headquarters Training Command	
Army	Major Robert Walter Hartley	For service to Australian Army in the field of electronic warfare	
Army	Lieutenant Colonel Gordon Robert Hill	For service to the Australian Army as second in command of the Special Air Service Regiment	
Army	Brigadier Noel John McGuire	For service to Australian Army as Commander 1st Military Division	
Army	Lieutenant Colonel John Albert Pietzner	For service to Australian Army Financial Management	
Army	Colonel Donald Quinn	For service to Australian Army as Commanding Officer, Central Army Records Office	
Army	Major Kimlyn Bruce Templeton	For service to Army Reserve, particularly in the 17th Battalion, the Royal New South Wales Regiment	
Air Force	Squadron Leader Peter Chappelow	For service to the Royal Australian Air Force as the Head of the Maintenance Development Office for the Hornet Aircraft Programme, Williamtown	
Air Force	Wing Commander Ross Campbell Clelland	For service to the Royal Australian Air Force while on exchange with the United States Air Force	
Air Force	Wing Commander Barry James Ellison	For service to the Royal Australian Air Force as the Senior Equipment Officer at RAAF Base Amberley Queensland	
Air Force	Wing Commander Bruce John Stewart Mouatt	For service to the Royal Australian Air Force as Director of Operations in the Tactical Fighter Project Office	
Air Force	Group Captain David Norman Rogers	For service to the Royal Australian Air Force as Commanding Officer, Base Squadron Richmond	
Air Force	Air Commodore Hans Jorg Friederich Roser	For service to the Royal Australian Air Force as Director General Tactical Fighter Project	

=== Medal (OAM) ===
==== General Division ====
Recipient	Citation	Notes
Betty Allan	For services to the welfare of those with impaired hearing	
Phyllis May Allum	For service to medicine, particularly in the field of stress-related problems	
Audrey Evelyn Anderson	For service to nursing	
Marie Armstrong	For service to the performing arts	
Daisy Bacon	For service to the community, particularly through the Girl Guide movement	
Councillor Dorothy Jean Baker	For service to the community and local government	
Alderman Jill Lorraine Barber	For service to the community and local government	
Stewart Barnes	For service to the community, to youth, international relations and peace	
Edna Barolits	For service to the public service, particularly to the Aboriginal community	
Kenneth Peter Neville Baronie	For service to the community, particularly through the Good Neighbour Council of Western Australia and the Migrant Emergency Fund	
Geoffrey Frank Barron	For service to the community and the welfare of Broken Hill residents	
Fay Norma Bataille, MBE	For service to education and the community of Norfolk Island	
Barbara Edith Biggins	For service to the arts, particularly through the South Australian Council for Children's Films and Television	
Thomas Charles Boag	For service to tennis and public service	
Francis Neville Bonser	For service to the fishing industry	
Clement Booth	For service to the intellectually impaired	
Dr Thomas Henry Boshier	For service to the dental profession	
Henry Francis Boyle	For service to the community, particularly in the field of local history	
Richard David Bradshaw	For service to the performing arts as a puppeteer	
Neil Anthony Bridgefoot	For service to the community and local government	
Nancye Margaret Bridges	For service to the performing arts	
Robert Alden Brooks	For service to the welfare of the physically impaired	
James John Brown	For service to conservation and gymnastics	
Valerie Mary Browne	For service to the welfare of autistic children	
Carol Margaret Budd	For service to the public service	
Errol Desmond Bungey	For service to the sport of lawn bowls	
Charles Lloyd Burley, QFSM	For service to the community	
Joan Kathleen Burnett	For service to the community and ballet	
Eileen Beryl Burns	For service to the community, particularly through the Heidelberg Repatriation General Hospital	
Herbert Buttery	For service to the visually impaired	
James Benedict Cahill	For service to the community, particularly in the field of Aboriginal education	
John Phillip Carmody	For service to the public service	
Sidney Hayward Castine	For service to the community and local government	
Daniel Clark	For service to the sport of cycling	
Joyce Yvonne Clothier	For service to ballet	
William Henry Collins	For service to those with intellectual disabilities	
Elaine Adele Colquhoun	For service to the community, particularly to pony clubs	
Raymond Martin Conroy	For service to the sport of harness racing	
Leslie John Constable	For service to the community	
Captain Raymond Keith Cooper	For service to the community as a military historian	
Mavis Corbett	For service to the community, particularly to children	
James Mitchell Cornwell	For service to the community and health administration	
Michael Joseph Curtis	For service to the community and local government	
Graham Hamilton Dillon	For service to the Aboriginal community	
Herman Cornelius Drenth	For service to the community	
Kevin Charles Duffy	For service to the public service and to the community	
Richard Alfred Dunn	For services to the sport of rugby league	
Cornelius Henry Dwyer	For service to the transport industry, particularly as general secretary of the Taxi Council Queensland	
Randolph Keith Evans	For service to the community	
Megan Marjorie Evans	For service to music	
Winsome Joan Evans, BEM	For service to music	
John Bateson Faulkner	For service to the community	
Reverend Diego Fernandez Del Rio	For service to the Spanish community	
Charles Allen Fishburn	For service to the community, particularly to youth	
Herbert Crommelin Fitzroy	For service to the community	
Catherine Foggo	For service to the community, particularly in the field of local history	
Kathleen Margaret Forte	For service to the community, to international relations and peace	
Maxwell Henry Gale	For service to the community and to international relations	
Margaret Clare Gartland	For service to the community in the field of education	
John Gavegan	For service to journalism	
Myra Frances Gofton	For service to the community and to ex-service personnel	
Clifford Dominic Goodchild	For service to music	
Sally Sophia Goold	For service to nursing education	
Keith Francis Gooley	For service to the meat industry and to the community	
Dianne Rose Gorman	For service to the sport of hockey	
Michael Robin Francis Goss	For service to art as an artist and administrator	
Albert Holmes Graham	For service to the community	
Jessie Marshall Griffin	For service to the community	
Ronald Selwyn Grubb	For service to the community and to the welfare of ex-personnel	
Mario Rheta Hardie	For service to the community, particularly to the Asthma Foundation of New South Wales	
Herbert Colin Livingston Harvey	For service to the community	
Erwin Ernest Heckendorf	For service to the community	
Albert George Henderson	For service to local government and to the community	
Adeline Ethel Hicking	For service to welfare, particularly to the Royal Flying Doctor Service	
Ellen Mary Higham	For service to nursing education	
Perry Colin James	For service to local government and to the community	
Henry Thomas Jarvis	For service to the community	
David Leslie Jimmieson	For service to the welfare of ex-service personnel	
Stephen Kelen	For service to literature	
Douglas James Malbon Kiely	For service to the community, particularly to youth	
Louis Stevenson Langoulant	For service to health administration and the community	
Francis Wilbur Le Page	For service to the community and to local government	
Walkiri Valery Walter Lebedew	For service to volleyball	
Andrew Lederer	For service to soccer	
John Albin Edmund Lee	For service to the community and to local government	
Stanley Lewis	For service to the community	
Andrew Shu Wah Lim	For public service as secretary of the Australian Capital Territory Medical Board	
Beryl Iris Lovell	For service to the community	
Hurtle Reginald Lupton	For service to the community and to local government	
Barry Layton Macdonald	For service to the welfare of ex-service personnel	
William James MacFarlane	For service to the community, particularly the sick in the Hunter region	
Stanley Hastings Manning	For service to welfare, particularly with the Wesley Central Mission	
Ronald Leslie Marriott	For service to youth, particularly through the scouting movement, and to the community	
George Francis Gell Marshall, QPM	For service to rugby union football	
Barbara Mary McDonough	For public service, particularly the establishment of specialised libraries for the Department of Defence	
Edna Betty McGill	For service to education and to the community	
Ena Irene McGinn	For service to the community, particularly to Voluntary Aid and Australian Army Medical Women's Service Association	
Ethel Joyce McGrath	For public service with the Patents Office	
Francis William McGuren	For service to local government and to the community	
Betty Ilma McIntyre	For service to health, particularly in the field of occupational therapy	
Jean Alice Sutherland McKinlay	For service to the teaching of music, particularly to children	
Amelia McLachlan	For service to the community	
Barbara Patricia Mehan	For service to infant welfare	
Elsie Rose Milton	For service to the Royal Newcastle Hospital	
Dr Geoffrey Henry Moore	For service to medicine	
Stanley John Nicholes	For service to sport as a fitness consultant	
Phillipena Noel	For service to libraries, especially in the field of children's literature	
Allen George Norris	For service to athletics and sports administration	
James Andrew Noseda	For service to athletics and sports administration	
Eva Esme O'Brien	For service to nursing, particularly at the Heidelberg Repatriation General Hospital	
John Francis O'Hanlon	For service to the community through charitable organisations	
Henry Thomas O'Neill	For service to the newsagency industry	
Bernard Philip O'Reilly	For service to the St John Ambulance Association and to the community	
Karleen Osborne	For service to young people with physical disabilities	
Maisie Oclanis Pain	For service to the red cross and to the welfare of those with Down's Syndrome	
Patricia Paton	For public service with the Department of Foreign Affairs	
George William Perry	For service to the community, particularly to senior citizens	
Dr Harry Peters	For service to medicine, particularly as administrator of the Prince of Wales Hospital	
Gordon George Poidevin	For service to the community	
Herbert Clive Pratt	For service to the temperance movement	
Superintendent Robert John Noel Prigg	For public service with the Australian Federal Police Force	
Dimitrios Psarakis	For service to the community, particularly the Greek community	
Frederick Douglas Quinane	For service to the community	
Gary Arnold Radford	For service to the community	
Dr John Gojko Radunovich	For service to the community and medicine	
Stephen Istvan Raskovy	For service to wrestling	
Robert Pearson Reading	For service to agriculture and to the community	
Jean Heather Richards	For service to the community through charitable organisations	
Merle Erica Richardson	For service to lawn bowls through the Newcastle District Bowling Association, and to the community through service groups and as a fundraiser for welfare organisations and for projects at the University of Newcastle	
Ronald Ross	For service to the community	
Dr Michael Sawer	For service to international relations between Australia and China	
Paul Vincent Scanlan	For service to the community	
Leila Caroline Schmidt	For service to the community, particularly to the Asthma Foundation of New South Wales	
John Matthew Schreck	For service to horse racing	
Archibald Allan Scott	For service to the community	
Ann Elizabeth Scott	For service to the media as a rural broadcaster and to the community	
Raymond Thomas Shea	For service to the community and to the trade union movement	
Raoul Wesley Shepherd	For service to the welfare of ex-service personnel	
Stuart Howard Shorter	For service to scouting	
Francis Ian Showell	For service to the tourist industry	
Mary Elizabeth Smith	For service to the community	
Lenore Irene Snowden	For service to the community	
Fergus John Gordon Speakman	For service to athletics	
Edwin George Stafford	For service to the Retired Police Association of Victoria and to the community	
Robert Herbert Stringer	For service to the community, particularly in the field of health	
Margaret Emily Sutherland	For service to early childhood education	
Elizabeth Symonds	For service to those with disabilities particularly to the Spastic Centre of New South Wales	
Matthew Douglas Tallon, MC	For service to cricket and hockey	
Harry William Thomas Tidmarsh	For service to the welfare of the physically impaired, particularly as a splintmaker	
Dorothy Mary Trumble	For service to those with impaired hearing	
Kenneth John Turner	For service to local government and to the community	
James Patrick Ulbrick	For service to manufacturing engineering and to the community	
Lawrence Waina	For service to the Aboriginal community	
Captain Joyval Mary Walton	For service through the Salvation Army to the rehabilitation of the drug and alcohol addicted	
Captain Robert Walton	For service through the Salvation Army to the rehabilitation of the drug and alcohol addicted	
Sing-wu Wang	For public service to the National Library, particularly to the Orientalia collection	
Mary Alice Watt	For service to the community	
Mearl Dew Waye	For service to the community through the Queen Victoria Hospital Auxiliary	
Dianne Leslie Gillett Weidner	For service to the community through the National Trust of Queensland and Toastmasters International	
John William Weir	For service to community radio as a voluntary music librarian	
Ralph Arthur Whitfeld, MBE	For service to local government and to the community	
Dorothy Winifred Wicks	For community service to welfare organisations	
Alfred Forbes Wilson	For service to religion and to the Aboriginal communities of northern Australia	
Eric John Woodcock	For service to the community of King Island	
Lindsay Gordon Woods	For service to the welfare of the elderly, particularly through the Lionsville Homes	
Kathleen Margaret Ziesing	For service to the community, particularly through the care of the sick and elderly	

==== Military Division ====
Branch	Recipient	Citation	Notes
Navy	Chief Petty Officer Garry Raymond Coombe	For service to the Royal Australian Navy as Chief Instructor at the Submarine Warfare Systems Centre HMAS Watson	
Navy	Chief Petty Officer Susanne Lindell Finch	For service to the Royal Australian Navy, particularly as a member of the staff of the Director of Sailors' Postings	
Navy	Lieutenant Pamela Margaret Gadd	For service to Naval communications	
Navy	Chief Petty Officer Douglas Eric Short	For service to the Royal Australian Navy as Chief Boatswain's Mate and Training Chief Petty Officer on board HMAS Stuart	
Navy	Chief Petty Officer David Liegh Woodall	For service to the Royal Australian Navy in the Directorate of Naval Supply Services	
Navy	Warrant Officer Leslie Harold Lyndon Wright	For service to the Fremantle Port Division of the Royal Australian Naval Reserves while serving at HMAS Leeuwin	
Army	Warrant Officer Class Two Lindsay John Augustus	For service to the Australian Army as caterer, 2nd Cavalry Regiment	
Army	Warrant Officer Class One Christopher Brown	For service to the Australian Army as an adviser with the Defence Cooperation Program in Western Samoa	
Army	Warrant Officer Class One Graeme Douglas Brown	For service to the Australian Army as Battery Sergeant Major, 10th Medium Regiment, the Royal Regiment of Australian Artillery	
Army	Captain Peter John Campbell	For service to the Australian Army as Regimental Quarter master Sergeant, 2nd/3rd Field Engineer Regiment	
Army	Warrant Officer Class Two John Thomas Dolton	For service to the Australian Army in the field of supply	
Army	Warrant Officer Class One Trevor Stanley Grewar	For service to the Army Reserve, particularly with the 5th Field Engineer Regiment	
Army	Sergeant Leslie Arthur Owens	For service to the Australian Army in the 1st Military District Band	
Army	Sergeant Kenneth Reginald Phillips	For service to the Australian Army, particularly as a medical adviser in cyclone-damaged Vanuatu in 1985	
Army	Warrant Officer Class One Kerry James Small	For service to the Australian Army in the field of Personnel Management	
Army	Warrant Officer Class One Kevin Laurence Smith	For service to the Australian Army, particularly as Regimental Sergeant Major, North West Mobile Force	
Army	Warrant Officer Class One Robert Wayne Smith	For service to the Australian Army, particularly as Australian Exchange Officer and Instructor at the United States Army Engineer School	
Army	Warrant Officer Class Two Gary David Vale	For service to the Special Air Service Regiment of the Australian Army	
Army	Warrant Officer Class Two Darryl James Waddell	For service to the Australian Army, particularly as the Training Warrant Officer the Pilbara Regiment at Tom Price	
Air Force	Sergeant Donald Maxwell Eccles	For service to the Royal Australian Air Force as the Senior Non-Commissioned Officer in-Charge of the Equipment section at No 75 Squadron	
Air Force	Sergeant Ronald Edward Holdcroft	For service to the Royal Australian Air Force as the Senior Non-Commissioned Officer, Chef-in-Charge of both the Officers and Sergeants Messes at RAAF East Sale	
Air Force	Warrant Officer David Allan Lugg	For service to the Royal Australian Air Force as the Warrant Officer-in-Charge of Laboratories Flight at No 2 Aircraft Depot	
Air Force	Warrant Officer Michael Richard Morris	For service to the Royal Australian Air Force as a Flight Engineer Instructor with the Airman Aircrew Flying Training School	
Air Force	Warrant Officer David Parker	For service to the Royal Australian Air Force as the Warrant Officer Clerk Administrative at Headquarters RAAF Base Williamtown	
Air Force	Warrant Officer John Robertson	For service to the Royal Australian Air Force as the Non-Commissioned Officer-in-Charge of Boeing 707 Aircraft Maintenance at No 486 Squadron	
Air Force	Warrant Officer Alan William Rudd, BEM	For service to the Royal Australian Air Force as Warrant Officer-in-Charge of Engine Production Section at No 3 Aircraft Depot	
Air Force	Flight Sergeant Robert Alfred Syer	For service to the Royal Australian Air Force as the Senior Non-Commissioned Officer-in-Charge of the Physical Training Section at RAAF Base Richmond	
