= Toodyay railway station =

Railway station in Western Australia

Toodyay
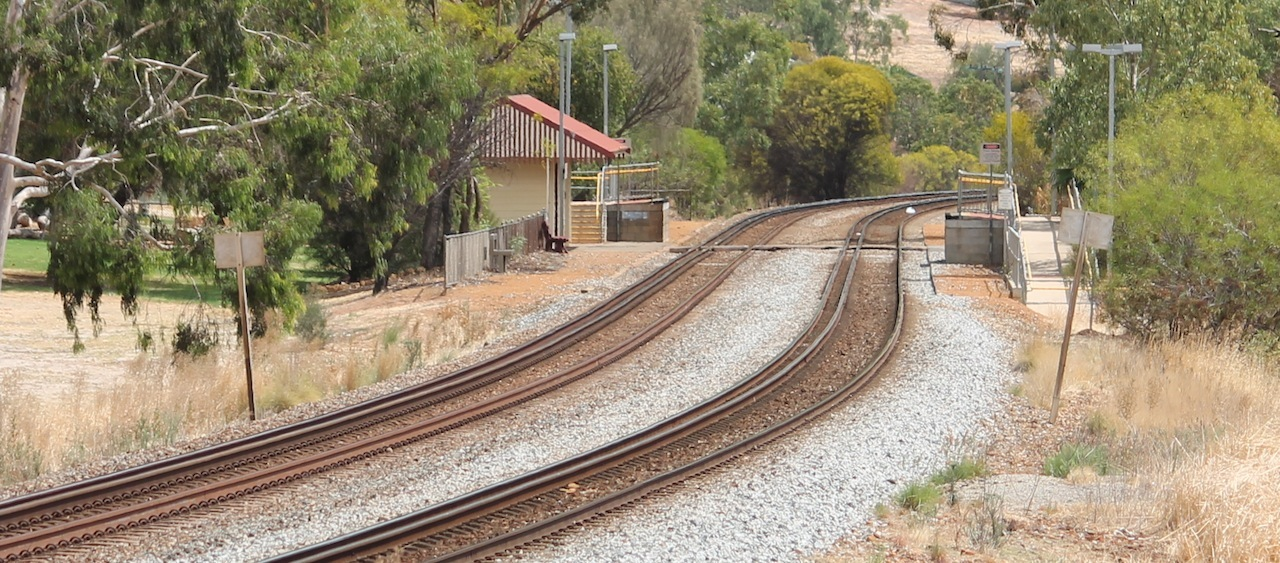
- General view of the station platforms looking west in March 2014

General information
- Location: Anzac Avenue, Toodyay
- Coordinates: 31.5516°S 116.4653°E
- Owner: Public Transport Authority
- Operator: Transwa
- Line: Eastern
- Distance: 93 kilometres (58 mi) from Perth
- Platforms: 2 side
- Tracks: 2

Construction
- Structure type: Ground
- Accessible: Yes

Other information
- Status: Unstaffed

History
- Opened: 14 February 1966

Services
Preceding station	Transwa	Following station
Midland towards East Perth	AvonLink	Northam Terminus
Midland towards East Perth	MerredinLink	Northam towards Merredin or Kalgoorlie
Midland towards East Perth	Prospector	Northam towards Merredin or Kalgoorlie
Location

Toodyay railway station is located on the Eastern Railway in the Avon River town of Toodyay in Western Australia.

== History ==
There have been three stopping places for railway passengers in Toodyay.

As was the case with other communities in Western Australia at the time, railway routes through established localities caused concern to the residents when the railway lines were in planning stages.

=== Original stopping point ===
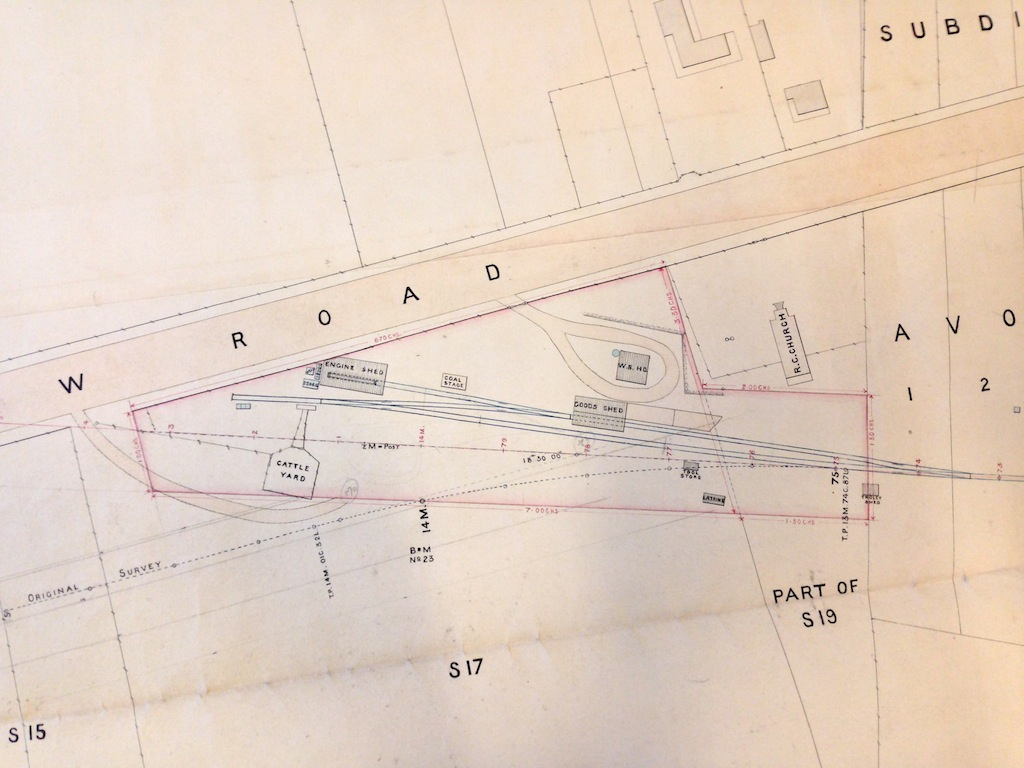
Location of original stopping point from 1892 PWD plan

The original railway stopping point on the narrow gauge Clackline–Miling line was where a railway platform is indicated on the north side of the track on the Public Works Department plan for that time.

=== Original station ===
The locality at that time was known as Newcastle; by 1897 the station building was constructed within a short distance west of the original terminus, and was referred to regularly in advertising as being across the road from the Newcastle Hotel. (Note: In the two pages of Jack Stanbridge's 70 years of rails & wire in Western Australia, book two, devoted to Old Toodyay Station, the text to a photo of the station confuses some issues - "Copy of opening day of Rail to Newcastle in 1888" against a photo of the 1897 building.)

On 6 May 1910, Newcastle was regazetted as Toodyay with the station likewise renamed. The line was extended west, then over the Avon River, and then north in stages, reaching Miling in August 1925.

=== Current station ===
Although the route was surveyed in the 1940s, it wasn't until the passing of the Railways (Standard Gauge) Construction Act 1961 that construction commenced on the dual gauge Eastern Railway through the Avon Valley.

As part of the construction of the new line, Toodyay was provided with a station on the new alignment, opening on 14 February 1966 with the narrow gauge line through Toodyay closed and later removed. The new dual gauge line passed through the town of Toodyay with a new station built west of the earlier stations.

The Clackline-Miling narrow gauge line branches off the Eastern Railway at West Toodyay, which was a former marshalling yard, three kilometres west of Toodyay.

== Passenger services ==
Transwa's AvonLink, MerredinLink and Prospector services stop at Toodyay, at least one service each day.
