= Owen Hackett =

Guard and settler of Western Australia

Owen Hackett (1809–1862) was one of a number of Enrolled Pensioner Guards (EPGs) that came to colonial Western Australia between 1850 and 1868. Their role was to guard and oversee the work of the prisoners transported to Western Australia.

In common with many of the Enrolled Pensioner Guards, Hackett was Irish and Roman Catholic. He was born Owen (Onifred) Hackett in 1809 to James and Margaret Hackett in St James, Dublin. On 18 January 1830, at age 21 years, he enlisted with the British Army and served for 21 years. His service included being posted in the Mediterranean for six and a half years, and the West Indies and British Guiana for almost three years. In 1844 he was promoted to corporal and then sergeant of the 47th Regiment in November 1848. A report on his character states he was a good and trustworthy soldier. He is described in the records as 170 centimetres (5 ft 7 in) tall, fair complexion, grey eyes and brown hair. He was discharged at Waterford on 26 May 1851 with a pension. Around 1849 Hackett married Margaret Ann O’Flaherty. The couple were to have seven children, David Eugene, Margaret, Joseph, John Frederick, James, Mary and Owen. In 1853 the Hacketts were living in Newmarket, Dublin when Owen was drafted as an Enrolled Pensioner Guard bound for the Swan River Colony. The family arrived aboard Robert Small in August 1853 or in 1856. On the voyage over Mrs Hackett was a signatory to a memorial of thanks to Dr Morris for his services to the wives and children of the Pensioner Guards.

The Hacketts first settled in Fremantle, before moving to Toodyay in 1856. Hackett, now a lance corporal, was allotted a parcel of land at the Convict Hiring Depot 4 kilometres (2.5 mi) upstream of the town. Thirteen allotments, S1 to S13, had been marked out, and between 1852 and 1856 two-roomed brick cottages were erected. Hackett's cottage on S10 remains at 80 Stirling Terrace. Around 1861 Hackett sold his lot to Joseph Taylor Monger who also bought Lot S8 from James Smith. Monger built the Newcastle Hotel and a steam mill on the site. In 1858, Hackett and many other Enrolled Pensioner Guards in the colony contributed to the Indian Relief Fund that had been set up in England following the Indian Mutiny of 1857. Many of the EPGs had served in India with the British Army before their retirement. The mutiny led to the ending of the East India Company in 1858, and the establishment of the British Raj.

Hackett died on 24 July 1862 and was buried at Nardie Cemetery. His son David, who was still a young lad, started work as a shepherd and hutkeeper. In 1865 David earned the admiration of everyone for his bravery when he was helping Edward Clarkson move a flock of 800 sheep to the eastern runs at Dalbycutting. Following two attacks by Aboriginals that left David with a broken arm and Clarkson dying from a leg wound, David was taught by Clarkson how to use the stars to guide him to W. Eaton's station at Quelquelling. David, accompanied by his sheep dog, took three days to cover the 140-kilometre (90-mile) walk to Eaton's station. Clarkson's body was found and buried at Hawthornden. Another son James became a sergeant in the army and married the daughter of another Pensioner Guard.

== General references ==
- Broomhall, F.H. (1989). The Veterans. A History of the Enrolled Pensioner Force in Western Australia, 1850 – 1880. Victoria Park: Hesperian Press. p. B103.
- Cromb, Alison (2010). The History of the Toodyay Convict Depot. A tale of the convict era of Western Australia. Dianella: Alison Cromb.
