= Swan Valley Nyungah Community =

Former community in Western Australia

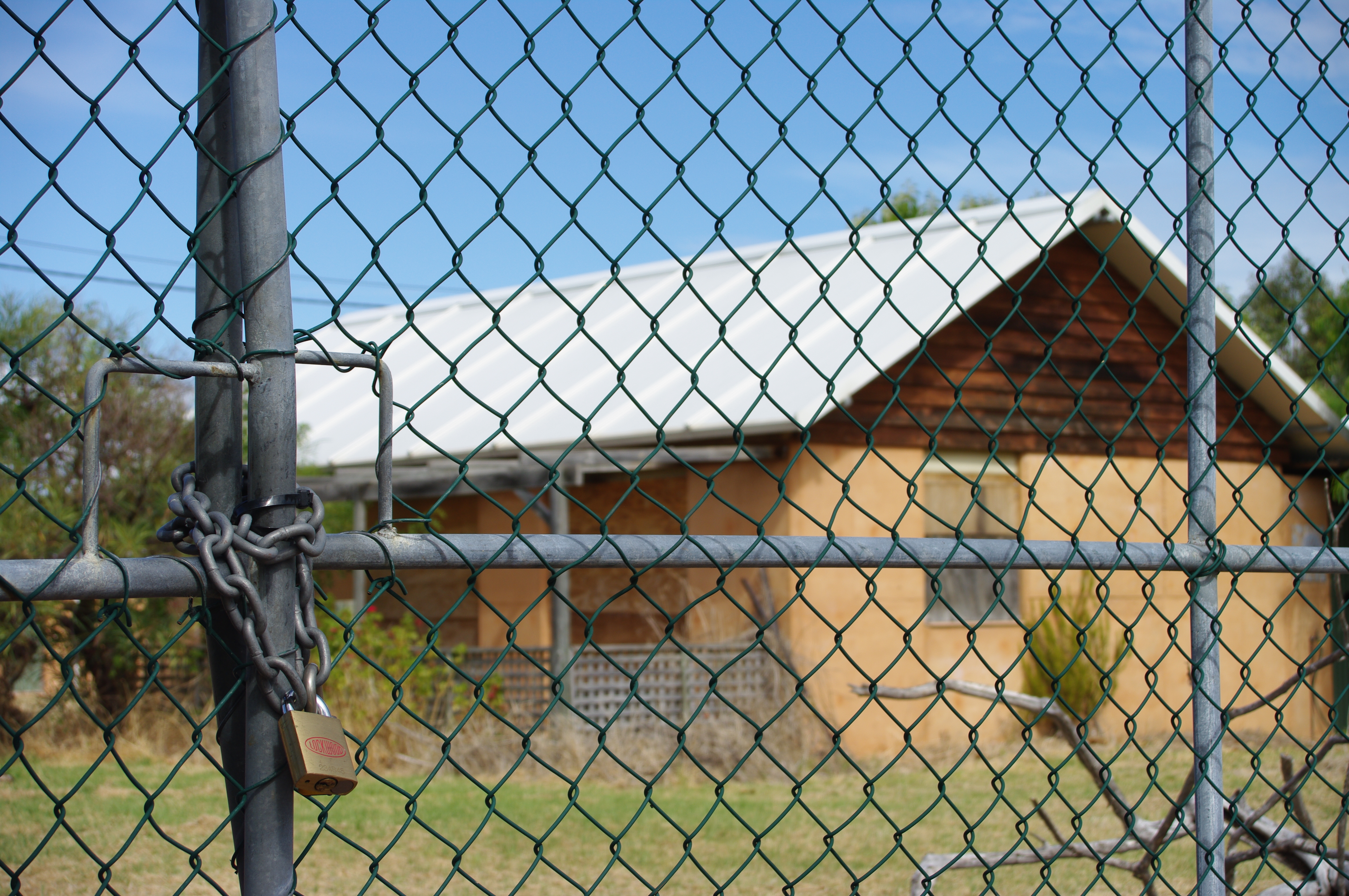
Swan Valley Nyungah Community, Lockridge

The Swan Valley Nyungah (Noongar) Community was an Aboriginal community of Noongar people at Lord Street, in the outer Perth suburbs of Lockridge and Eden Hill in Western Australia.

The Government of Western Australia closed the settlement in 2003 by act of Parliament following allegations of widespread sexual abuse, rape and substance abuse, after a 15-year-old girl, Susan Taylor, committed suicide in 1999.

The suicide was the subject of a coronial inquest, followed by the 2001 Gordon Inquiry into claims of family violence and child abuse in Western Australian Aboriginal communities. This led to the formation of a parliamentary select committee which reported on matters surrounding the Community and its closure.

On 6 June 2008, Bella Bropho, on behalf of the Community, lost an appeal to the Federal Court on the grounds that their eviction and loss of property was in breach of the Racial Discrimination Act 1975. In March 2014, the Lockridge campsite was demolished to make way for a conservation reserve and meeting place.

== History ==
Archaeological evidence suggests that the area has been inhabited for at least 38,000 years. From the 1830s until the 1940s the land was owned by the Hamersley family, which allowed Nyungah people to remain on their traditional campsite. In 1941 a group of Swan Valley Nyungah women from the Kickett, Nettles, Warrell and Parfitt families purchased 20 acres (8 ha) of bushland bounded by Gallagher Street and Mary Crescent, Eden Hill. The local council refused their requests for water and applications to build housing so they camped in mia-mias, bush breaks and tin camps and relied on water dug from their own wells. In the 1950s the area was resumed by the State Housing Commission for the creation of the suburb of Eden Hill.

In 1977 several groups decided to make a stand at the Lockridge Campsite and in 1981 the people incorporated themselves as Fringedwellers of the Swan Valley Inc. The Fringedwellers began a series of protests asking the government to assist them with housing. During the 1980s the improvised huts and tents were replaced with government-supplied mining cabins.

On 19 July 1994 the Lockridge Campsite became the Swan Valley Nyungah Community when governor- general Michael Jeffery, "by virtue of the provisions of Section 33(2) of the Land Act 1933", vested Reserve 43131 (Swan Location 11942) in the Swan Valley Nyungah Community Aboriginal Corporation for the designated purpose of "use and benefit of Aboriginal Inhabitants".) With federal-government funding, community members designed their own culturally appropriate and environmentally sensitive housing. The community started its own school which taught Indigenous content and had a good attendance record. The camp also had a good relationship with local police.

== Gordon Inquiry ==
On 12 February 1999 Susan Taylor was found hanged in the toilet block at the Swan Valley Nyungah Community. The State Coroner Alastair Hope conducted an inquest which heard evidence from one girl who said that Robert Bropho had offered her money for sex. Another witness said girls, including Susan, had told her that Bropho gave them paint to sniff and money in exchange for sex. Coroner Hope returned an open finding into her death but said that "it was likely she took her own life after years of sexual abuse, and said it was apparent there was widespread sexual abuse against young Aborigines [in the community]."

On 29 November 2001 the State Government called for Magistrate Sue Gordon to lead an inquiry into child abuse and domestic violence in Aboriginal communities in Western Australia. Published on 31 July 2002 the report by the inquiry ran to over 640 pages and made 197 findings and recommendations. Finding #141 specifically named the Swan Valley Nyungah Community, recommending they "...develop Memoranda of Understanding (MOU) between the Swan Valley Nyoongar Community and those government agencies, which may reasonably seek access to that community".

== Timeline of closure ==
- 14 May 2003 Geoff Gallop, the Premier of Western Australia, issued a media statement stating that the Swan Valley Nyungah Community was "a place of ruination and despair". He said the camp should be closed because "allegations of abuse and violence continue to be made informally and through advocate groups". The women and children of the community protested outside Parliament House and requested an opportunity to present their case to the Premier. The request was denied.
- 15 May 2003 Gallop issued another media statement saying "The Gordon Inquiry raised a number of concerns about the Swan Valley Nyungah Community" and "There is only one course of action: the current Management Order must be revoked".
- 16 May 2003 Robert Bropho was charged with raping Lena Spratt in 1975. On the same day Bevan Carter, the deputy Mayor of the Town of Bassendean, said he "suspected a link" between closure of the camp and government plans to develop the land. In The Australian an article by Paul Toohey reported that "The idea is to break Bropho's grip on the community and put the residents into ordinary suburban housing".
- 17 May 2003 the new legislation was knocked back by the Liberal Party and the Greens. Former Attorney-General Peter Foss, asked "Why would you chuck out the victims with the perpetrators? You can't solve a social problem by kicking everybody out. The Government is kidding people if they think the only place in WA where child abuse and domestic violence is happening is the Swan Valley Nyungah Community. It's happening everywhere. This is tokenism where the Government is pretending it is solving a problem and may in fact aggravate it".
- 22 May 2003 Indigenous Affairs Minister Alan Carpenter labelled the community "a tragic disgrace". He said "We are living in the 21st century, yet a component of our society is living in the Dark Ages where people are routinely bashed, raped and possibly murdered including 2 1/2 year old children".
- 3 June 2003 the State Liberal Party reversed its opposition to the forced closure of the camp: "You will get this bill through parliament if you can give assurances as to the immediate care, the welfare, the safety, the protection, the housing of the people living in the Swan Valley community, both now and long term" After the Reserves (Reserve 43131) Act 2003 passed through Parliament the Opposition spokesman for Aboriginal Affairs, Derrick Tomlinson, resigned in protest. On 12 June 2003 Greens senator Jim Scott called for an inquiry into the Government's use of legislation to close the community: "This is an incredibly serious piece of legislation in that it infringes on people's rights in a way it has never been done before".
- 13 June 2003 the Swan Valley Nyungah Community was closed and police were given an order to remove any inhabitants from the reserve. State housing was arranged for several residents and others were forced to seek shelter elsewhere. Robert Bropho commenced a hunger strike on the steps of Parliament House, protesting the closure. He said he would not eat until there was an inquiry into the Reserves Act. Bropho was arrested outside Parliament House on 20 June 2003 and charged with 9 counts of sexually assaulting his sister's granddaughter. He told the media "There's no fair trial for me here. I'm wondering if there is a safe court to go to in this state".

=== Select Committee Inquiry ===
In 2003 and 2004, the closure was reviewed by a legislative council appointed inquiry known as the "Select Committee on Reserves (Reserve 43131) Bill 2003". The inquiry report found that Premier Geoff Gallop's decision "to act rapidly, by-passing all normal processes, was justified on false information". It also found that the Government "was not in a position to accommodate former residents of the SVNC quickly" and had "significantly underestimated the number of families and individuals requiring assistance".

Sue Gordon, who was interviewed by the Select Committee and said: "I would not single out the Swan Valley Nyungah Community. That was just in the media the most because of Mr Bropho and the allegations against him. There are allegations against a lot of other so-called leaders but they do not get as much publicity". Sue Gordon, who said the Swan Valley Nyungah Community was "an adequate and reasonably well maintained facility" also said "I do not think there are any similarities whatsoever between a management order and a memorandum of understanding".

Other evidence submitted at the inquiry included that of Mr David Pedler, Acting Assistant Director, Regional Management, Department of Indigenous Affairs. Pedler submitted briefing notes regarding the proposed closure which said: "The Bropho family are the only individuals that could be defined as 'permanent residents' of SVNC ..."; "The community is simply a facility that is dominated by the Bropho family, provides housing to selected transient people and provides office and other facilities, that cater solely for the activities of Mr Robert Bropho"; and "SVNC is essentially a closed community. The closed nature of the community is primarily achieved by dominance and intimidation of residents by the Bropho family."
