= Kiara College =

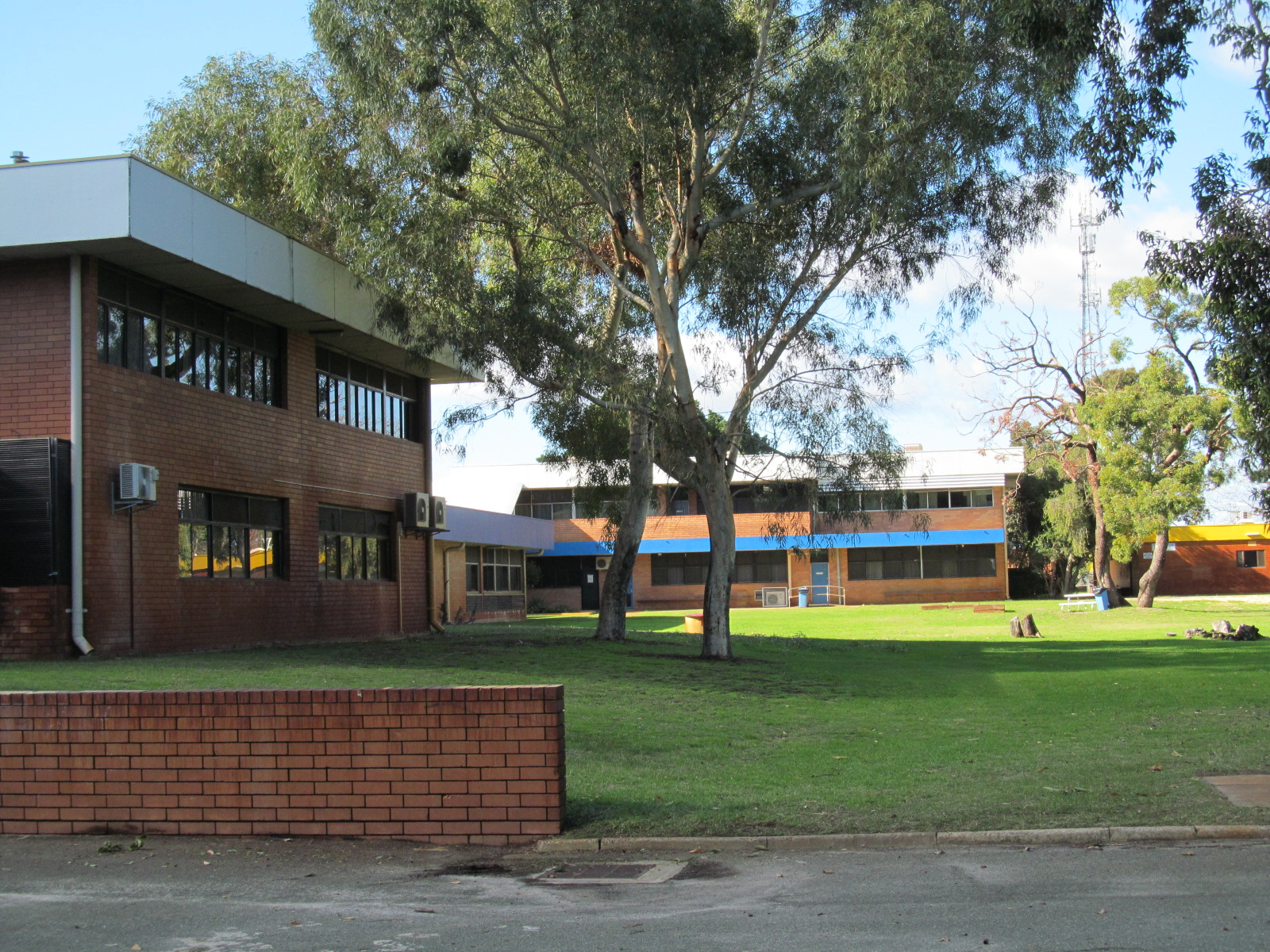

Location
- 368 Benara Road; Kiara, Western Australia; Australia; 31°52′37″S 115°56′06″E

Information
- Former names: Lockridge Senior High School, Lockridge High School
- Type: Independent public co-educational day school
- Opened: 1974; 52 years ago
- Educational authority: WA Department of Education
- Specialist: Agriculture; Basketball
- Principal: Kaye Stevens
- Years: 7–12
- Enrolment: 475 (2020)
- Campus type: Suburban
- Colours: Purple and light blue
- Website: www.kiaracollege.wa.edu.au

Kiara College is an Independent public co-educational high day school, located in the Perth suburb of Kiara, Western Australia.

== History ==
Kiara College was established in 1974 as Lockridge High School. By 1979, the school was renamed to Lockridge Senior High School. In 2015, the school was renamed to Kiara College, and that same year it became an Independent Public School.

== Future ==
A $20.7 million upgrade is set to start construction in October 2020, which includes a performing arts centre, covered outdoor sports courts, new carpark and refurbishments to existing buildings.

== Programs ==
Kiara College has Department of Education endorsed specialist programs in agriculture and basketball.

=== Agriculture ===
Kiara College has a 27 hectare, fully functioning farm on site. Students in the Agriculture Specialist Program learn about cattle, pigs, sheep, horticulture, aquaculture and poultry. Primary schools students can go on excursions to the Kiara College farm as a part of the school's Agricultural Awareness Program.

=== Basketball ===
The basketball specialist programs allows students to develop their skills in playing, coaching and refereeing basketball. Students in the program participate in it for 4 hours per week. Students can take part in the college basketball team and participate in school-based competitions. Year 11's and 12's have an opportunity to attain their Level 1 Referee Certificate and complete a first aid qualification. Students can also do a Certificate II in Sport Coaching.

== Local intake area ==
Kiara College's local intake area covers Beechboro, Bennett Springs, part of Brabham, Caversham, Dayton, part of Eden Hill, part of Kiara and West Swan. Students living in the local intake area have a guaranteed place at the school if they apply. Students living outside the local intake area may join the school if they are accepted into one of the specialist programs or after being judged on a case-by-case basis.

== Academic results ==
Due to the low number of students completing ATAR, median ATARs have not been published recently.

| Year | Rank | Median ATAR | Eligible students | Students with ATAR | % Students with ATAR |
|---|---|---|---|---|---|
| 2019 | - | - | 49 | 7 | 14.29% |
| 2018 | - | - | 54 | 8 | 14.81% |
| 2017 | - | - | 59 | 9 | 15.25% |

== Student numbers ==
| Year | Number |
|---|---|
| 2014 | 305 |
| 2015 | 392 |
| 2016 | 387 |
| 2017 | 415 |
| 2018 | 435 |
| 2019 | 475 |
| 2020 | 487 |
| 2021 | 541 |

== Notable alumni ==
- Des Headland – Former AFL footballer for Brisbane and Fremantle, premiership player for the Brisbane Lions
- Colin Holt – National Party politician
- Sharryn Jackson – Labor Party politician

== See also ==
- List of schools in the Perth metropolitan area
