= Belsham =

Belsham is a surname. Notable people with the surname include:

- Sel Belsham (1930–2016), New Zealand rugby league player
- Thomas Belsham (1750–1829), English Unitarian minister
- Ulva Belsham (1921–2011), New Zealand telegraphist and volunteer radio operator
- Vic Belsham (1925/1926–2006), New Zealand rugby league player and referee
- William Belsham (1752–1827), English political writer and historian
