= Wendy Chapman =

Australian politician

Wendy Jennifer Chapman AM (born 3 June 1942) is a former Australian politician. She served on the Adelaide City Council as an alderwoman between 1981 and 1983 before becoming the first woman Lord Mayor of Adelaide in 1983. Chapman held her mayoral position until her defeat in the 1985 Adelaide mayoral election by Jim Jarvis. The following year, Chapman became a Member of the Order of Australia at the 1986 Queen's Birthday Honours. After her mayoral career, Chapman was a property developer with her husband during the mid 1980s and was involved in the Hindmarsh Island bridge controversy in the 1990s.

== Early life and education ==
Chapman was born on 3 June 1942. For her education, Chapman attended a Presbyterian school before going to The Queen Elizabeth Hospital in South Australia.

== Career ==
Chapman began her political career as an alderwoman for the Adelaide City Council between 1981 and 1983. In October 1983, Chapman became the first woman ever to be elected as the Lord Mayor of Adelaide. After holding her position for two years, Chapman ran for mayoral re-election in 1985 but was defeated by Jim Jarvis. After her mayoral career, Chapman and her husband were development planners for a proposed marina at Hindmarsh Island in the mid 1980s. Years later, the Chapmans were part of the Hindmarsh Island bridge controversy when objections to a connecting bridge from Hindmarsh to Goolwa were brought up by the Ngarrindjeri people in the 1990s.

== Awards and honors ==
Chapman was named a Member of the Order of Australia at the 1986 Queen's Birthday Honours.

== Personal life ==
Chapman is married to Tom and has four children.
