= Megan-Jane Johnstone =

Nursing scholar

Megan-Jane Johnstone AO
- Born: New Zealand
- Occupation: Nursing scholar

Megan-Jane Johnstone (AO) is Australia’s foremost nursing ethics scholar. She is renowned internationally for her scholarly works in the areas of nursing and health care ethics, with a particular focus on patients’ rights, cross-cultural ethics, health and human rights, mental health ethics, professional conduct, patient safety ethics, end-of-life ethics, and more recently pandemic ethics and the ethics of peace activism by nurses. In March 2017 Megan-Jane retired from her academic position as Professor of Nursing, Deakin University, Melbourne, and continues to writes as an independent scholar.

Megan-Jane Johnstone AO is the author of several books including Bioethics: a nursing perspective, first published in 1989 and released as an 8th revised edition in 2023, and invited curating editor of Nursing Ethics, a three volume Sage major reference publication. Other books by Johnstone include: Nursing and the injustices of the law; Ethics in nursing practice: a guide to ethical decision making (Co-Authored with Sara T Fry); Alzheimer's disease, media representations and the politics of euthanasia: constructing risk and selling death in an ageing society; Effective writing for health professionals: a pocket guide to getting published first published in 2004 and released in 2023 as a second revised edition, and Contributing Editor of The Politics of euthanasia: a nursing response. In 2019, Johnstone was awarded Officer of the Order of Australia "(for) distinguished service to medical education in the field of nursing and health care ethics, to patients' rights, and to professional standards."

== Education ==
From 1974 to 1977, Johnstone trained as a nurse at Waikato Hospital, Hamilton, NZ, and went on to study Philosophy and Literature at University of Waikato from 1980 to 1984. There she received the Prior Society Prize in Philosophy, awarded to third year students demonstrating outstanding ability in the subject of philosophy. From 1985-1986 she completed a Master of Arts preliminary in Philosophy at Monash University. From 1990 to 1992 Johnstone was at La Trobe University where she completed a Doctor of Philosophy (Legal Studies). In 1990, she received the Annie M. Sage Nursing Memorial Scholarship, Royal College of Nursing, Australia (now known as Australian College of Nursing), to support her PhD studies.

== Career ==
Megan-Jane Johnstone began her academic career in 1987 as a lecturer in nursing at the former Phillip Institute of Technology, now RMIT University. From 1998 to 2008 she served as Professor in the Department of Nursing and Midwifery at RMIT University, until moving to Deakin University, where she held positions in the School of Nursing and Midwifery until 2017. At retirement, Professor Johnstone was Academic Chair/Professor of Nursing at the School of Nursing and Midwifery. In January 2025, Megan-Jane Johnstone accepted an Honorary position as Adjunct Professor in the School of Nursing and Midwifery, La Trobe University, Melbourne, Australia.

Since retirement, she has been practising as a visual artist and, in addition to her Adjunct Professor duties, continues to write as an independent scholar.

== Awards ==
1984: Recipient of the Waikato University Prior Society Prize in Philosophy, awarded to third year students demonstrating outstanding ability in the subject of philosophy.

1990-1992: Recipient of an Australian Postgraduate Award (APA) (scholarship) to undertake her PhD at La Trobe University;

1990: Recipient of the Annie M. Sage Nursing Memorial Scholarship, Royal College of Nursing, Australia (now known as Australian College of Nursing) to undertake PhD studies at La Trobe University.

1998: Recipient of the Inaugural Mona Menzies Post Doctoral Research Award, Nurses Board of Victoria, to conduct post doctoral research into ethical issues associated with the mandatory reporting of child abuse.

2010: Australian College of Nursing (formerly Royal College of Nursing, Australia) Merit Award for Publication.

2023: Victorian Artists Society (VAS): Awarded Signatory Membership for her contributions and services to the Arts.

== Honours ==

2019: Officer of the Order of Australia "for distinguished service to medical education in the field of nursing and health care ethics, to patients' rights, and to professional standards".
