= Francis Kirk =

Guard and settler of Western Australia

Francis Kirk (c. 1807 – 1869) was one of a number of Enrolled Pensioner Guards (EPGs) who came to the Swan River Colony between 1850 and 1868, to guard and oversee the work of the prisoners transported to Western Australia. (Note: "Enrolled Pensioner Guards" exhibition display material provided by Army Museum, Fremantle, 2015. Pensioner Guards, State Library of Western Australia.)

== Early life ==
Kirk was born at Achalive, County Tyrone around 1807. On 28 November 1823, aged 16 years, he enlisted with the British Army at Glasgow and served as a private for 22 years with the 8th Royal Artillery. His service included eight years in Corfu. He was discharged at Woolwich on 13 October 1846 with a pension. Kirk is recorded as exhibiting exemplary conduct and was awarded four Good Conduct badges. He is described as being 172 centimetres (5 ft 7 3/4 in) in height, with fair hair and blue eyes.

== To Western Australia ==
Kirk, with his wife Mary and their five-year-old son Francis, left England on 30 December 1850 on the transport Mermaid. The boat carried a number of other Pensioner Guards and their families, as well as 209 convicts, including John Acton Wroth.

They arrived at Fremantle on 21 May 1851, and travelled with a number of other Pensioner Guards to the settlement of Toodyay, where they were temporarily housed in A-framed straw huts at the first Toodyay Convict Hiring Depot and Pensioner Guard Barracks, and allotted one of the 2-hectare (5-acre) plots of land, lot P12, that had been surveyed for the EPGs. These allotments were later transferred to the permanent Convict Hiring Depot, 4 kilometres (2.5 mi) upstream of the town.

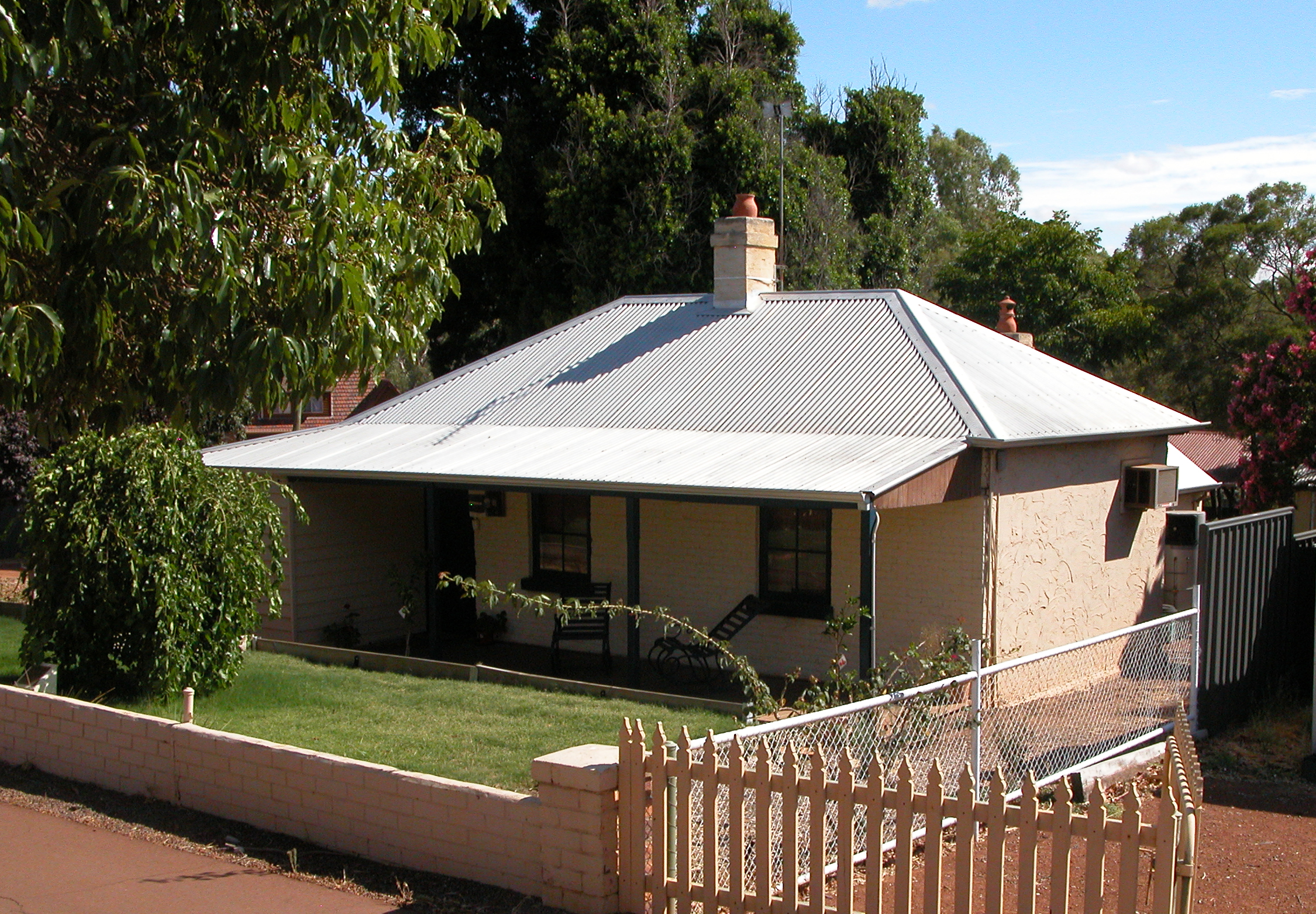
Kirk's Cottage

Thirteen allotments, S1 to S13 were marked out at the Convict Depot, and from 1852 to 1856 two-roomed brick cottages were erected. Kirk was assigned lot S12.

In 1857 Governor Arthur Kennedy closed down the country hiring depots. However the depot at Toodyay was not totally deserted as a number of convicts and ticket-of-leave men were still working in the district. Also by that time all the Pensioner Guards and their families had moved from the town of Toodyay to their new cottages at the Depot, creating a Pensioner Village. A number of them, including Kirk, stayed and settled in Toodyay permanently. Kirk's cottage still stands at 68 Stirling Terrace.

== Convict Depot overseer ==
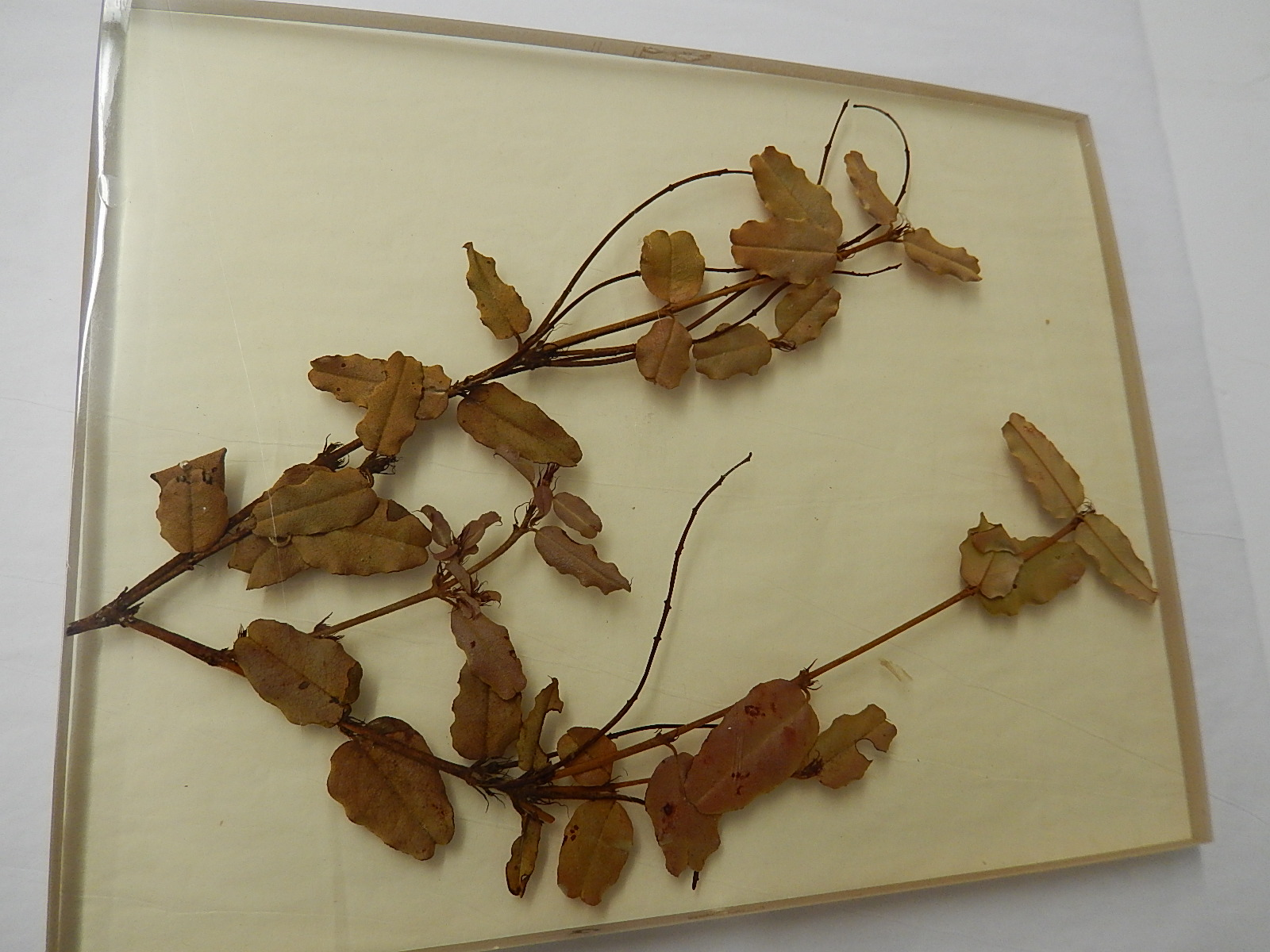
Gastrolobium calycinum in resin

Kirk had been appointed overseer at the Depot and was also in charge of the "flying parties" of convicts who were brought up to Toodyay for short periods to undertake major roadwork. There had been severe floods in 1857 and work was needed on the roads and the Depot ford. The road parties also worked from camps located at various points along the main roads to Guildford, Northam and Culham, to the north of Toodyay. One of the tasks was the removal of poison plants growing within 20 metres (66 ft), being two chains, of either side of the roads that were used to move stock. The plants, in particular the York Road poison (Gastrolobium calycinum), had been identified as the cause for the previous large loss of animals.

== Death and legacy ==
Kirk died on 22 November 1869, and was buried in what had once been the Roman Catholic cemetery in Duke Street, behind the Newcastle hospital. A wooden headboard marked his grave. His family continued to live in Newcastle, now Toodyay.

== General References ==
- Broomhall, F.H., The Veterans. A History of the Enrolled Pensioner Force in Western Australia, 1850 – 1880, Hesperian Press, Victoria Park, 1989.
- Cromb, Alison, The History of the Toodyay Convict Depot. A tale of the convict era of Western Australia, published by Alison Cromb, Dianella, 2010.
- Elliot, I., Moondyne Joe. The Man and the Myth, Hesperian Press, 1998. [first published 1978 by UWA Press]
- Rica Erickson, ed. (1988). Bicentennial Dictionary of Western Australians: Pre-1829 – 1888. Vol. 3 K–Q. Nedlands: UWA Publishing. p. 1763. ISBN 0-85564-276-9. LCCN 88151753. OCLC 19221630. OL 2102384M. Wikidata Q115122719.
- This article incorporates text by Robyn Taylor available under the CC BY SA 2.5 AU licence.
