= National Indigenous Council =

Advisory body appointed by the Australian Government (2004–2008)

The National Indigenous Council (NIC) was an appointed advisory body to the Australian Government through the Minister's for Indigenous Affairs' Taskforce on Indigenous Affairs (MTIA) established in November 2004 (not to be confused with the earlier Ministerial Taskforce on Indigenous Affairs (MTF) chaired by Mal Brough), and wound up in early 2008. It was chaired by Sue Gordon, a Western Australian magistrate.

== History ==
NIC was established as a government-appointed 14-member advisory body, subsequent to the abolition of the Aboriginal and Torres Strait Islander Commission (ATSIC), which was an elected body of Indigenous Australian representatives. The new body found little support among Aboriginal and Torres Strait Islander peoples, although the members of the Council were respected, because it was felt that the appointed members had no mandate to speak on behalf of Indigenous people. While the Howard government stressed that the NIC was not intended to replace ATSIC, and nor was it a representative body, a leaked document from the federal cabinet in April 2004 had used the word "replace" several times.

NIC first met on 8–9 December 2004. It was supposed to run until 31 December 2007.

A government inquiry into the demise of ATSIC recommended in March 2005 "that the NIC be a temporary body, to exist only until a proper national, elected representative body is in place".

On 15 January 2008, the Minister for Families, Housing, Community Services and Indigenous Affairs, Jenny Macklin, announced that the NIC would be wound up. The news was largely welcomed by Indigenous Australians.

== Functions ==
The terms of reference of the council were to provide expert advice to government on improving outcomes for Indigenous Australians. It would report to the Ministerial Taskforce on Indigenous Affairs (MTA), and would support the work of the MTA to develop "strategies which would improve the delivery of services to Indigenous Australians". It was not involved in specific funding proposals or in the planning of proposals being undertaken in individual communities. While it was regarded as the principal source of advice to the government, other bodies and individuals would also be consulted by the government.

According to Minister Amanda Vanstone, the Council's goals would include such matters as facilitating early childhood development, improving safety for Indigenous women and children, and reducing welfare dependence. Gordon indicated that Aboriginal domestic violence would be a top priority.

== Members ==
The first 14 members appointed were:

- Sue Gordon (Chair)
- Wesley Aird
- Archie Barton
- Miriam Rose Baumann
- MaryAnn Bin-Sallik
- Joseph Elu
- Adam Goodes
- Sally Goold
- Robert Lee
- John Kundereri Moriarty
- Warren Mundine
- Joe Proctor
- Michael White
- Tammy Williams

== Commentary ==
The appointment of the National Indigenous Council sparked controversy both among Indigenous leaders and politicians. Former Aboriginal football player Michael Long turned down a position on the board.
