= Select Committee on Reserves (Reserve 43131) Bill 2003 =

Australian parliamentary committee

The Select Committee on Reserves (Reserve 43131) Bill 2003 is an Australian select committee that investigated the eviction of the Swan Valley Nyungah Community (SVNC) from their traditional land through the use of the Reserves (Reserve 43131) Bill 2003. It investigated the motives of the Western Australian Gallop government in proposing and passing the bill.

== Background ==
The Nyungah Aboriginal peoples have made attempts to reclaim their traditional land since 1919 when the Guildford Aboriginals were transhipped to the Moore River native settlement. Robert Bropho, an Aboriginal elder, and his extended family campaigned vigorously for the right to occupy the area which presently takes in Reserve 43131. The SVNC was established in 1977 and under the Aboriginal Heritage Act 1972 they were given control of the reserve.

On 12 February 1999 a 15-year-old Aboriginal woman named Susan Taylor committed suicide in the reserve and on 22–30 October 2001 a coronial inquiry was held. The inquest investigated the circumstances in which Taylor and other Aboriginal young people lived. It accepted evidence that rape and sexual abuse of Aboriginal minors was widespread in Western Australia, that sexually transmitted diseases were higher than with non-Aboriginal children, that Aboriginal mortality rates are many times higher than that of the non-Aboriginal community, and that drug taking with Aboriginal people was a major problem. The Coroner also heard evidence "regarding alleged sexual abuse taking place in locations near the Reserve by Caucasian males providing paint or glue to young people for sexual favours. Allegations were also made against Bropho of sexual misconduct, involving Taylor and her mother Lena Spratt. An allegation of indecent assault made by Taylor against Bropho's son, Richard Bropho, was not pursued due to her death and a lack of corroborating evidence. Robert and Richard Bropho have strenuously denied these allegations." (2.28, page 57, Select Committee) The coroner found that government departments should not be restricted from Aboriginal reserves due to the alleged situation of abuse in Aboriginal communities. Allegations were also made that Robert Bropho had stopped the Aboriginal Medical Service from visiting the reserve due to the death of an infant, and in 1996 had also stopped the Department of Family and Children's Services after a child had disclosed inappropriate touching by older boys.

=== Gordon Inquiry ===
In the aftermath of the coronial inquiry, the Western Australian government established an inquiry entitled Inquiry into Response by Government Agencies to Complaints of Family Violence and Child Abuse in Aboriginal Communities, or better known as the Gordon Inquiry after the chairwoman, Family Court Magistrate Sue Gordon. It was announced on 29 November 2001 by the Premier of Western Australia, Geoff Gallop. Its terms of reference were to examine the way that "Government agencies dealt with issues of violence and child sexual abuse at the Swan Valley Nyoongar community", to examine "how State Government agencies respond to evidence of family violence and child sexual abuse that may be occurring in Aboriginal communities generally", and to give "recommendations on practical solutions for addressing incidents of sexual abuse in Aboriginal communities, including any necessary legislative and administrative measures".

Published on 31 July 2002 the "Gordon Report" made a number of recommendations in respect of the Swan Valley Nyungah Community and government agencies.

== Findings ==
The Report of the Upper House Select Committee on Reserves (Reserve 43131) Bill 2003 found that Gallop's decision "to act rapidly, by-passing all normal processes, was justified on false information". It also found that the Government "was not in a position to accommodate former residents of the SVNC quickly" and had "significantly underestimated the number of families and individuals requiring assistance". The Select Committee made findings against the conduct of Premier Gallop's media adviser Kieran Murphy, who promised an exclusive story to newspaper journalist Colleen Egan. The report concluded that this "made Mr Murphy’s active participation in decision making all the more improper", "In particular, Mr Murphy’s obligation to deliver to Ms Egan a dramatic and media-worthy response mitigated against a considered and measured resolution". The Select Committee also found against Sean Walsh, Premier Gallop's Chief of Staff. The Report concluded that he had "completely bypassed the convention that public servants should advise vigorously and honestly and governments should decide in the light of their advice". It suggested that Walsh's conduct constituted a disciplinary offence under section 74 of the 1994 Public Sector Management Act.

The Select Committee also made findings against Richard Curry, Director General of the Department of Indigenous Affairs and Jane Brazier, Director General of the Department of Community Development, who "gave responses to the Premier based on incorrect, misleading and unsubstantiated anecdotal evidence" and did not test "the veracity of information given to them or their departments in areas that they should have known to be a government priority". Curry and Brazier had "no proper basis for providing advice to the Premier" as their departments were "inactive in regard to the Lord Street Camp". The Directors General "hadn't checked what their departments were doing before making their decision".

Magistrate Sue Gordon, who was interviewed by the Select Committee and said: "I would not single out the Swan Valley Nyungah Community. That was just in the media the most because of Mr Bropho and the allegations against him. There are allegations against a lot of other so-called leaders but they do not get as much publicity". Gordon, who said the Swan Valley Nyungah Community was "an adequate and reasonably well maintained facility" also said "I do not think there are any similarities whatsoever between a management order and a memorandum of understanding".

== Notes ==
=== References ===
- "Report of the Inquiry into Response by Government Agencies to Complaints of Family Violence and Child Abuse in Aboriginal Communities" (PDF). Archived from the original (PDF) on 10 June 2004.
