= Bropho v Western Australia =

Judgement of the High Court of Australia

- Court: High Court of Australia
- Full case name: Bropho v State of Western Australia and Another
- Decided: 20 June 1990
- Citation: [1990] HCA 24

Court membership
- Judges sitting: Mason CJ, Deane, Dawson, Toohey, Gaudron, McHugh and Brennan JJ

Bropho v Western Australia was a decision of the High Court of Australia, which ruled on 20 June 1990 that Section 17 of the Aboriginal Heritage Act 1972 of Western Australia bound the Crown in right of Western Australia.

== Background ==
=== Legislation ===
Section 17 of the Aboriginal Heritage Act 1972 of Western Australia prohibited the destruction or damage of aboriginal sites except with the consent of the responsible state minister. The Act did not expressly say whether it bound the Crown, although the Act provided that it applied to "all places" in Western Australia.

=== Facts ===
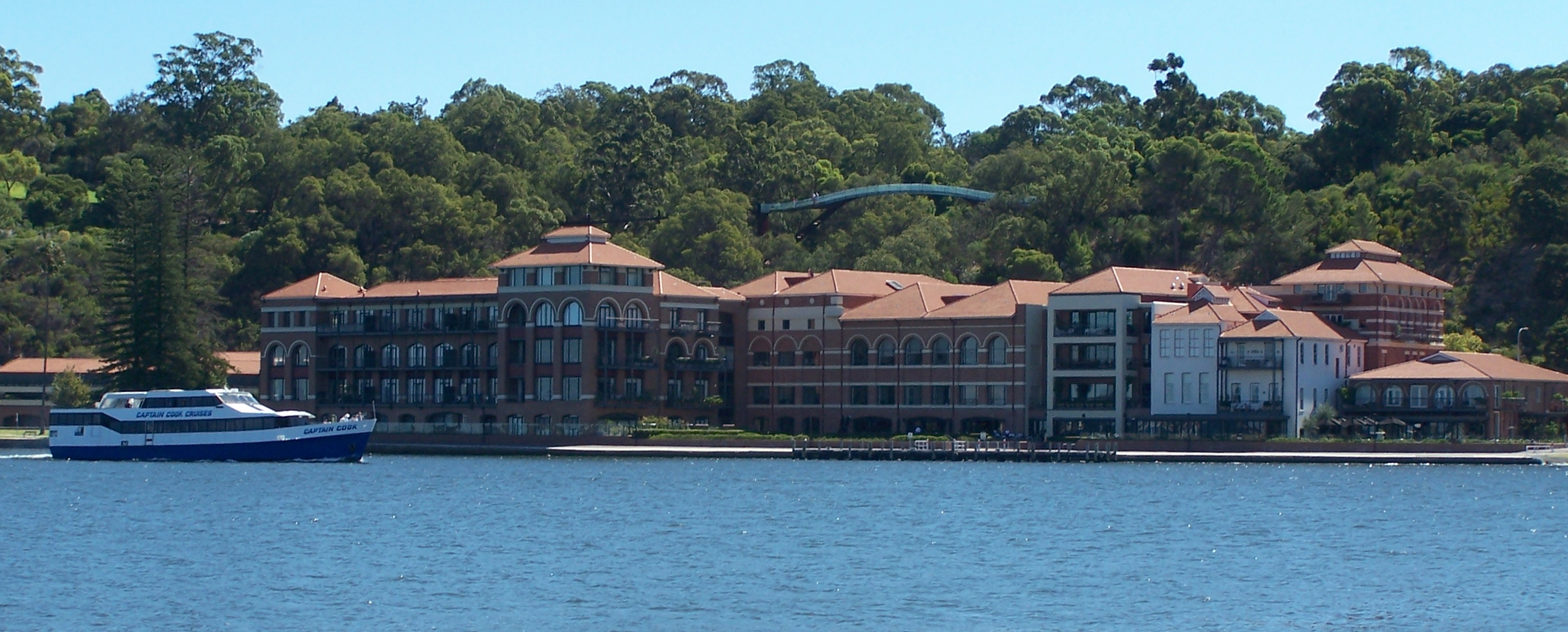
The redeveloped Swan Brewery

The Western Australian Development Corporation, a statutory corporation of the Western Australian government, undertook works to redevelop the prominent Swan Brewery site in Perth. The site was owned by the State of Western Australia. Robert Bropho, an Indigenous Australian activist, applied to the Supreme Court of Western Australia for an injunction against the development, claiming it was sacred Aboriginal land. Although Section 17 of the Aboriginal Heritage Act 1972 established a criminal offence, Bropho sought the civil remedy of an injunction. The Supreme Court refused to grant an injunction, holding that the Aboriginal Heritage Act 1972 did not bind the Crown in right of Western Australia. An appeal to the full bench of the Supreme Court failed, following which Bropho instituted a further appeal to the High Court of Australia.

=== Crown immunity before Bropho ===
Before Bropho, the law of Crown immunity in Australia was governed by Province of Bombay v Municipal Council of Bombay, a 1946 judgment of the Privy Council of the United Kingdom. The Privy Council held that there was a presumption that a statute did not bind the Crown. The presumption was only rebuttable by express words or "necessarily implication". The Privy Council narrowed the necessary implication ground to circumstances where the purpose of the statute would be "wholly frustrated" if the statute did not bind the Crown.

== Judgment ==
The High Court unanimously upheld Bropho's appeal, holding that Section 17 of the Aboriginal Heritage Act 1972 bound the Crown in right of Western Australia. Chief Justice Mason and Justices Deane, Dawson, Toohey, Gaudron and McHugh delivered a joint judgment. Justice Brennan delivered his own judgment that concurred with the joint judgment.

=== Joint judgment ===
The joint judgment affirmed the presumption against a statute binding the Crown. However, the judgment overturned the Bombay requirement that the presumption could only be rebutted by express words or necessary implication, criticising it as an "inflexible rule". According to the joint judgment, the relevant question was whether Parliament intended for the statute to bind the Crown. The intention of Parliament could be ascertained by reference to the content and objectives of the statute.

=== Justice Brennan ===
Justice Brennan concurred with the joint judgment, noting his view that employees and agents of the Crown should not be exempt from criminal laws.

== Subsequent action ==
Bropho's successful appeal did not prevent the redevelopment of the Swan Brewery. Later in 1990, Minister Carmen Lawrence gave her consent to the redevelopment, overriding the prohibition in Section 17 of the Aboriginal Heritage Act 1972. Bropho successfully challenged Lawrence's decision in the Supreme Court of Western Australia, but the Western Australian government won on appeal to the Court of Appeal.
