= List of State Register of Heritage Places in the Town of Bassendean =

The State Register of Heritage Places is maintained by the Heritage Council of Western Australia. As of 2026, 335 places are heritage-listed in the Town of Bassendean, of which 13 are on the State Register of Heritage Places.

== List ==
The Western Australian State Register of Heritage Places, as of 2026, lists the following 13 state registered places within the Town of Bassendean:

Place name	Place #	Street number	Street name	Suburb or town	Co-ordinates	Notes & former names	Photo
Daylesford, Bassendean	127	7	Daylesford Road	Bassendean	31.908264°S 115.961261°E	Yadgawine, Cyril Jackson's House	
Earlsferry	128	1	Earlsferry Crescent	Bassendean	31.900200°S 115.959875°E	Briarsleigh	
Bassendean Fire Station (former)	129	10-14	Parker Street	Bassendean	31.905046°S 115.947777°E		
Pensioner Guard Cottage	131	1	Surrey Street	Bassendean	31.904614°S 115.959202°E	'The Retreat', Old Pensioner's Cottage	
Bassendean Oval	7403	140	Old Perth Road	Bassendean	31.903056°S 115.955833°E	Bassendean Recreation Reserve, Steel Blue Oval, Bill Walker Stand & MacDonald Stand	
VR 1876 Post Box, Bassendean	7406		Surrey Street	Bassendean	31.904463°S 115.959727°E	Town Pillar Box	
Success Hill Lodge	9201	1	River Street	Bassendean	31.898727°S 115.957068°E	Lockridge Private Hospital, Lockridge Hotel, Miss Baileys Girls High School, Riverside Lodge	
Guildford Road Bridge	14558		Guildford Road	Bassendean	31.900223°S 115.961245°E	MRWA 910, Bassendean Bridge, Guildford Road Bridge over Swan River	
Bassendean Masonic Lodge (former)	16003	25	Wilson Street	Bassendean	31.906229°S 115.949269°E	West Guildford Masonic Lodge	
Basssendean Oval Entrance Gate	18088	1	West Road	Bassendean	31.904098°S 115.954477°E		
Bassendean Oval Grandstand	18089	1	West Road	Bassendean	31.902492°S 115.955523°E		
MacDonald Grandstand	18090	1	West Road	Bassendean	31.902686°S 115.955059°E		
Red Post Boxes Group	25501			Kalgoorlie, Busselton, Bassendean	31.904463°S 115.959727°E		
