= Sally Goold =

First Aboriginal nurse in New South Wales, Australia

Sally Sophia Goold
- Born: Sally Bamblett; Narrandera, New South Wales
- Medical career
- Profession: nurse
- Awards: Medal of the Order of Australia (1986); Senior Australian of the Year (2006)

Sally Sophia Goold OAM (née Bamblett) was a Wiradjuri woman who became the first Aboriginal nurse in New South Wales, Australia. Goold was awarded the Medal of the Order of Australia on 1986 and named the Senior Australian of the Year in 2006.

== Early life and education ==
Goold was born in Narrandera, New South Wales. After moving to Sydney as a child, she went to St Peters Public School. When Goold was 14, she dropped out of school to work in retail. At 16 years old, she began her nursing training at Royal Prince Alfred Hospital and became the hospital's first Aboriginal nursing student. Later after finishing her training, Goold extended her studies by earning a nurse education diploma and went to Queensland University of Technology for a Bachelor of Applied Science. Her highest education was a Master's degree in nursing at Flinders University

== Career ==
Upon completion of her training, Goold started her career working for the King George V Memorial Hospital and Royal Prince Alfred Hospital while becoming the first registered nurse working in New South Wales. In 1971, Goold was a co-founder of the Aboriginal Medical Service. Following establishment, Goold moved to teach at the Queensland University of Technology's nursing school. While teaching, she led Aboriginal health services for Queensland Health. After teaching for six years at the university, she influenced the creation of the Congress of Aboriginal and Torres Strait Islander Nurses in 1997 and named the congress's executive director. Other hospitals Goold taught at include the St Andrews War Memorial Hospital and Prince Charles Hospital. In 2007, Goold became part of the inaugural National Indigenous Council for the Australian Government.

== Awards and honours ==
In 1986, Goold was presented the Medal of the Order of Australia at the 1986 Queen's Birthday Honours. In 2006, Goold was named the Senior Australian of the Year.
