= Vic Belsham =

NZ international rugby league footballer

Vic Belsham AM
- Born: Victor Colin Belsham; 29 July 1925
- Died: 4 June 2006 (aged 80); Brisbane, Queensland, Australia
- Relatives: Sel Belsham (brother)
- Rugby league career

Playing information
- Position: Stand-off
Club
Years	Team	Pld	T	G	FG	P
	Point Chevalier
Representative
Years	Team	Pld	T	G	FG	P
	Auckland
1948	New Zealand

Refereeing information
Years	Competition	Apps
1957	World Cup	3
1958–1960	Other Internationals	4

Victor Colin Belsham AM (29 July 1925 – 4 June 2006) was a New Zealand rugby league player and referee who represented New Zealand. His position of preference was at stand-off. His brother, Sel, also played for the New Zealand national rugby league team, including in one match that was controlled by Vic. He was also prominent in cricket and squash.

== Rugby league career ==
From the Point Chevalier club, Belsham became an Auckland representative and was selected for the New Zealand national rugby league team tour of Australia in 1948. He was the understudy to Abbie Graham and did not play a match.

After retirement Belsham became a referee to gain experience for coaching. He enjoyed it however and remained as a referee. Belsham controlled three matches at the 1957 World Cup and also controlled four Test matches between New Zealand, France and Great Britain. In 1958 Belsham controlled the inaugural Auckland Rugby League grand final. He is one of only four New Zealanders to play for New Zealand and referee a test match.

== Cricket career ==
Belsham was also a cricketer and played twice for Auckland and once for the Auckland Colts between 1952 and 1959.

== Squash career ==
In later life, Belsham became involved in squash. For his involvement he was made a life member of both Qsquash (Queensland) and Squash Australia. The "Vic Belsham Trophy" is awarded to the winner of trans-tasman matches.

In the 1986 Queen's Birthday Honours Belsham was made a Member of the Order of Australia (AM) for "service to the sport of squash".

Belsham died on 4 June 2006 in Brisbane aged 80.
