= Eden Hill, Western Australia =

Eden Hill
- Suburb
- Interactive map of Eden Hill
- Coordinates: 31.891°S 115.944°E
- Country: Australia
- State: Western Australia
- City: Perth
- LGA: Town of Bassendean
- Location: 13 km (8.1 mi) from Perth; 8 km (5.0 mi) from Midland
- Established: 1954

Government
  - State electorate: Bassendean
  - Federal division: Hasluck

Area
  - Total: 2.3 km^{2} (0.89 sq mi)

Population
  - Total: 3,703 (SAL 2021)
- Postcode: 6054
Suburbs around Eden Hill
Kiara	Lockridge	Caversham
Morley	Eden Hill	Guildford
Bayswater	Bassendean	Guildford

Eden Hill is an eastern suburb of Perth, Western Australia, located within the Town of Bassendean. The origin of its name is unknown, either coming from a farm in the area or an estate name used by Henry Brockman when he subdivided the area in 1892. It was approved as a suburb in 1954. The Swan Valley Nyungah Community was in the area.

As of the 2016 Census, the total population was 3,454. The suburb comprises the majority of the North Ward of the Town of Bassendean.

Major facilities include Jubilee Reserve, Mary Crescent Reserve, Ashley Shave Skatepark, the Alf Faulkner community centre and the local education department Eden Hill Primary School.

== Transport ==
=== Bus ===
- 355 Galleria Bus Station to Whiteman Park Station – serves Ivanhoe Street
- 356 Galleria Bus Station to Ballajura Station – serves Walter Road East, Ivanhoe Street and Morley Drive
- 357 Galleria Bus Station to Whiteman Park Station – serves Lord Street
