= Hackett's (Pensioner) Cottage =

House in Toodyay, Western Australia

Hackett's (Pensioner) Cottage (fmr)
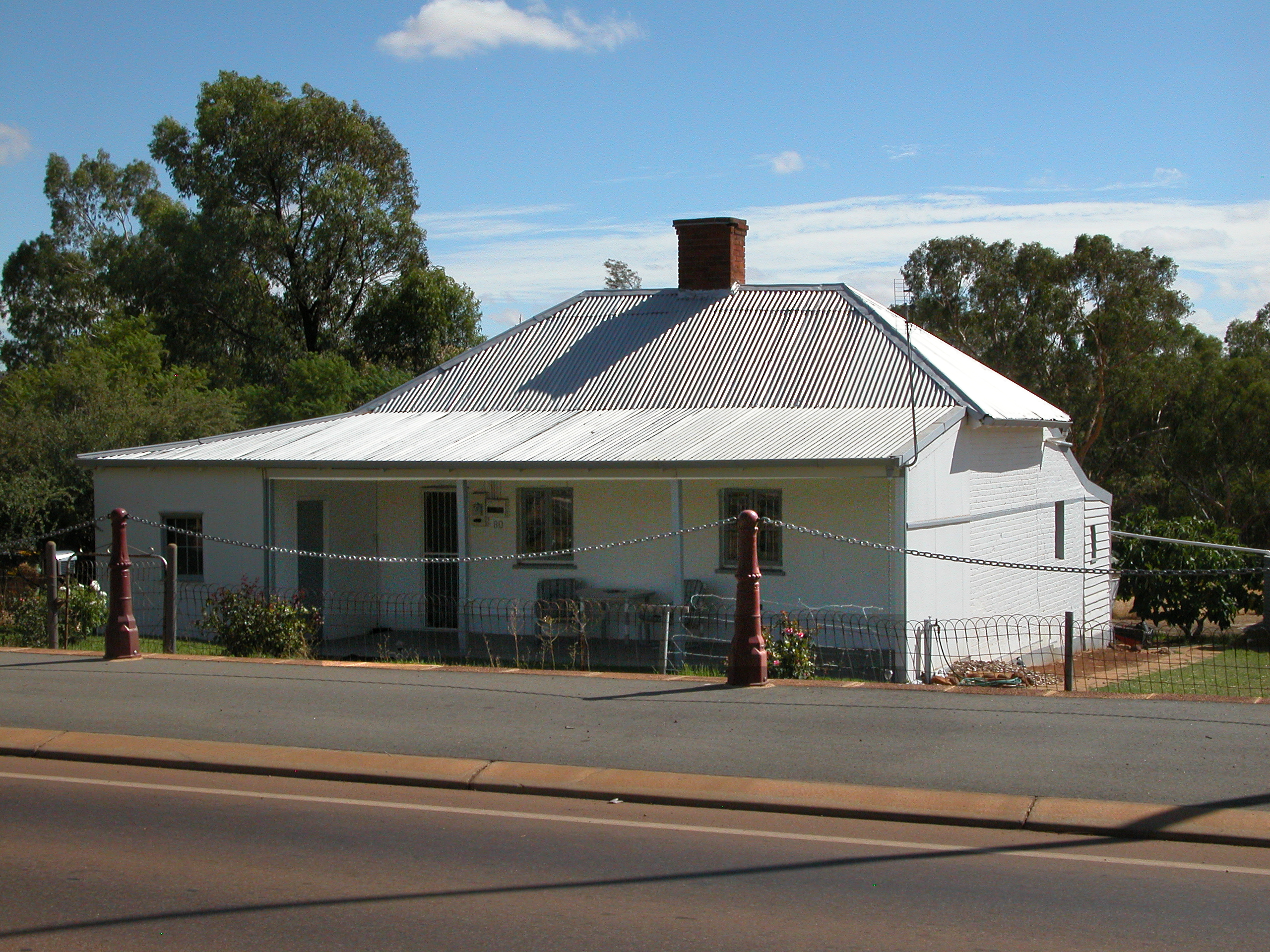
- Hackett's (Pensioner) Cottage
- Interactive map of the Hackett's (Pensioner) Cottage (fmr) area

General information
- Architectural style: Late Colonial Cottage style
- Location: 80 Stirling Terrace, Toodyay, Australia
- Coordinates: 31°33′5.9″S 116°28′16″E
- Completed: c1855

Hackett's (Pensioner) Cottage is located on Stirling Terrace in Toodyay, Western Australia and was built around 1855 by convict labour.

In 1852 urgent accommodation was required for pensioner guards who had accompanied the first shipments of convicts to Western Australia and on to the Toodyay Convict Hiring Depot. Pensioner Guards were retired army or police officers who were given pay and benefits to travel with convicts on the transportation ships from England. Upon arrival most of them continued to serve the Convict Establishment (managed from the Fremantle Prison site) as guards.

Land allotments were marked out on the northern portion of Toodyay's town site. This cottage, built for pensioner guard Owen Hackett, originally had two rooms with a shingle roof that is still intact under the newer corrugated iron roofing. Hackett arrived from Ireland in 1853 with his wife and two children. Five more children were born whilst they lived here.

In 1862 Joseph T. Monger bought this property and the adjacent property to build the Newcastle Hotel (now the Toodyay Tavern). He chose to keep the cottage onsite. Later occupants were Ernest and Tom James. As is the case with the nearby Kirk's (Pensioner) Cottage (fmr) its original appearance has been modified. Today the single storey painted brick and iron cottage has a hipped roof front and rear verandahs and a side extension. There are also two rear extensions of brick and weatherboard, and timber framed casement windows.
