= Kirk's (Pensioner) Cottage =

House in Toodyay, Western Australia

Kirk's Pensioner Cottage
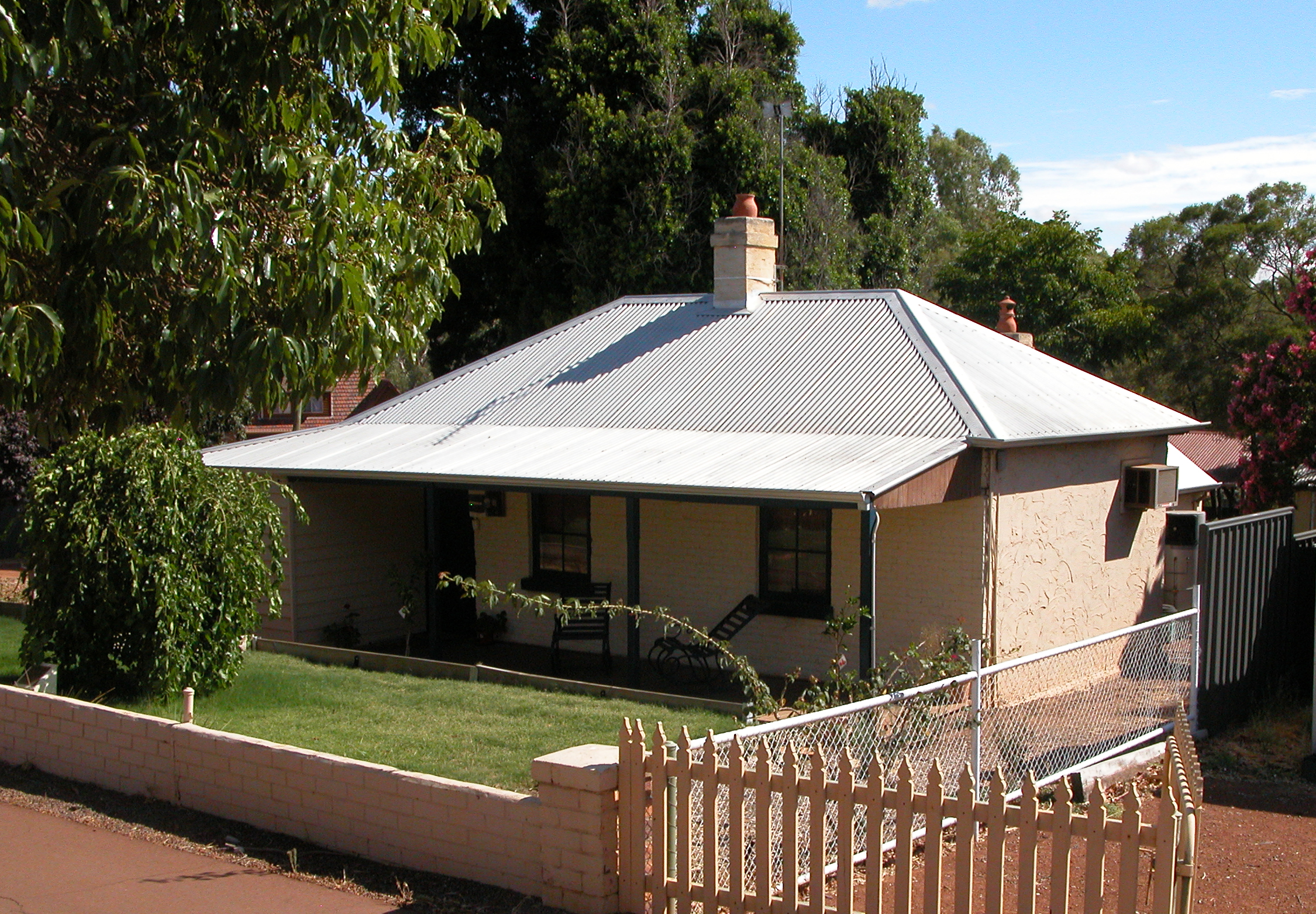
- Kirk's Cottage in 2014
- Interactive map of the Kirk's Pensioner Cottage area

General information
- Architectural style: Late Colonial Cottage style
- Location: 68 Stirling Terrace, Toodyay, Australia
- Coordinates: 31.552532°S 116.472116°E
- Completed: 1852–56

References
- Toodyay municipal inventory

Kirk's (Pensioner) Cottage on Stirling Terrace in Toodyay, Western Australia was built between 1852 and 1856 by convict labour.

In 1852 urgent accommodation was required for pensioner guards who had accompanied the first shipments of convicts to Western Australia and on to the Toodyay Convict Hiring Depot. Pensioner Guards were retired army or police officers who were given pay and benefits to travel with convicts on the transportation ships from England. Upon arrival most of them continued to serve the Convict Establishment (managed from the Fremantle Prison site) as guards.

Land allotments were marked out on the northern portion of Toodyay's town site. Pensioner guard Francis Kirk was allocated this site and he and his family were the first occupants of the modest cottage that was built. As is the case with the nearby Hackett's (Pensioner) Cottage (fmr) its original appearance has been modified. Today the building is at a lower level than the road and is a single storey brick residence with iron hipped roof, a side weatherboard extension which extends around to the rear and timber framed windows. There is a verandah to the front, the brickwork is laid in Flemish bond and there is a prominent chimney which has an ornate flue.
