= Toodyay Manor =

Hotel in Western Australia, built in 1862

Coordinates: 31°33′03″S 116°28′14″E

- Toodyay Manor
- The Toodyay Manor in November 2026
- Former names: Newcastle Hotel, Newcastle Tavern, Lavender Cafe, Toodyay Tavern

General information
- Architectural style: Victorian & Federation
- Location: 82 Stirling Terrace, Toodyay, Australia
- Completed: 1862
- Renovated: 1920, 1921,1947, 2014, 2020
- Landlord: TFT2 The Company Pty Ltd

Height
- Roof: Tile and tin

Technical details
- Grounds: 4,000 m^{2} (43,000 sq ft)

Design and construction
- Architect: G. Pickering (1921)

Other information
- Number of rooms: 15 Bedrooms

Website
- www.toodyaymanor.com

References
- Toodyay Municipal Inventory

Toodyay Manor on Stirling Terrace was originally the Newcastle Hotel in Toodyay, Western Australia.

It was built in 1862 for Joseph T. Monger on Pensioner Guard lots S8 and S10, first allocated to guards Hackett and Smith. Hackett's (Pensioner) Cottage (fmr) was not demolished as the land was developed and has survived. On the site Monger built a hotel and a steam mill.

The hotel was licensed in 1863 as the Newcastle Hotel. In 1870 Monger transferred the licence to J.G. Findell. In 1872 Ebenezer Martin took over the licence; he was replaced in 1874 by Thomas Donegan who only held the licence for a year before handing it on to W.G. Leeder. In 1877 Leeder became the owner of the property.

The site was developed further in the late 1890s with the construction of a pair of parapeted fronted shops abutting the hotel at 84 Stirling Terrace. The mill ceased operations in 1908, but was later converted to a skating rink for the townspeople and was also used as a picture theatre, with the operator - Palace Picture Shows - bringing its own electric lighting plant. A cottage (brick with hipped iron roof) was constructed in 1910 on 86 Stirling Terrace adjoining the shop pair.

In 1921 architect G. Pickering of Perth undertook some restoration of the hotel. The proprietor at that time was W.J. Murphy. Additions were also undertaken in 1947.
