= Mona Menzies =

Australian Nursing Administrator

Mona Menzies AM (4 June 1920 – 6 August 2017) was an Australian Nursing Administrator active through the 1950s to 1980s. She was made a Member of the Order of Australia in 1986.

She was born on 4 June 1920 in Wagga Wagga, and held various administrative roles thorough her career, including Registrar of Nurses Board (1952–1958), Council member of the Victorian College of Nursing (1953–1958), and Commissioner at the Health Commission of Victoria (1978–1984).

Menzies died on 6 August 2017.

== Honours ==

1986: Member of the Order of Australia for services to nursing.

== Mona Menzies Postdoctoral Research Grant ==
The Mona Menzies Postdoctoral Research Grant awarded up to $50,000 for "PostDoctoral research that relates to improving health outcomes across a number of areas, and/or changing the scope of practice in nursing and midwifery". Megan-Jane Johnstone (AO) was the inaugural awardee of this grant in 1998.
