= Kiara, Western Australia =

Kiara
- Suburb
- Interactive map of Kiara
- Coordinates: 31.882°S 115.939°E
- Country: Australia
- State: Western Australia
- City: Perth
- LGA: City of Swan
- Location: 12 km (7.5 mi) from Perth; 8 km (5.0 mi) from Midland

Government
  - State electorate: Bassendean
  - Federal division: Hasluck

Area
  - Total: 1.4 km^{2} (0.54 sq mi)

Population
  - Total: 1,776 (SAL 2021)
- Postcode: 6054
Suburbs around Kiara
| Morley | Beechboro | Beechboro |
| Morley | Kiara | Lockridge |
| Morley | Eden Hill | Eden Hill |

Kiara is a suburb of Perth, Western Australia, situated approximately 11 kilometres (7 mi) northeast of Perth's central business district and 8 kilometres (5 mi) from Midland, and located within the City of Swan local government area.

Schools in Kiara are Kiara College and Good Shepherd Catholic School.

== Transport ==
=== Bus ===
- 350 Caversham to Mirrabooka Bus Station – serves Benara Road
- 354 Galleria Bus Station to Ballajura Station – serves Wheatstone Drive, Aussat Drive and Bottlebrush Drive
- 355 Galleria Bus Station to Whiteman Park Station – serves Altone Road
