= Pensioner Guards =

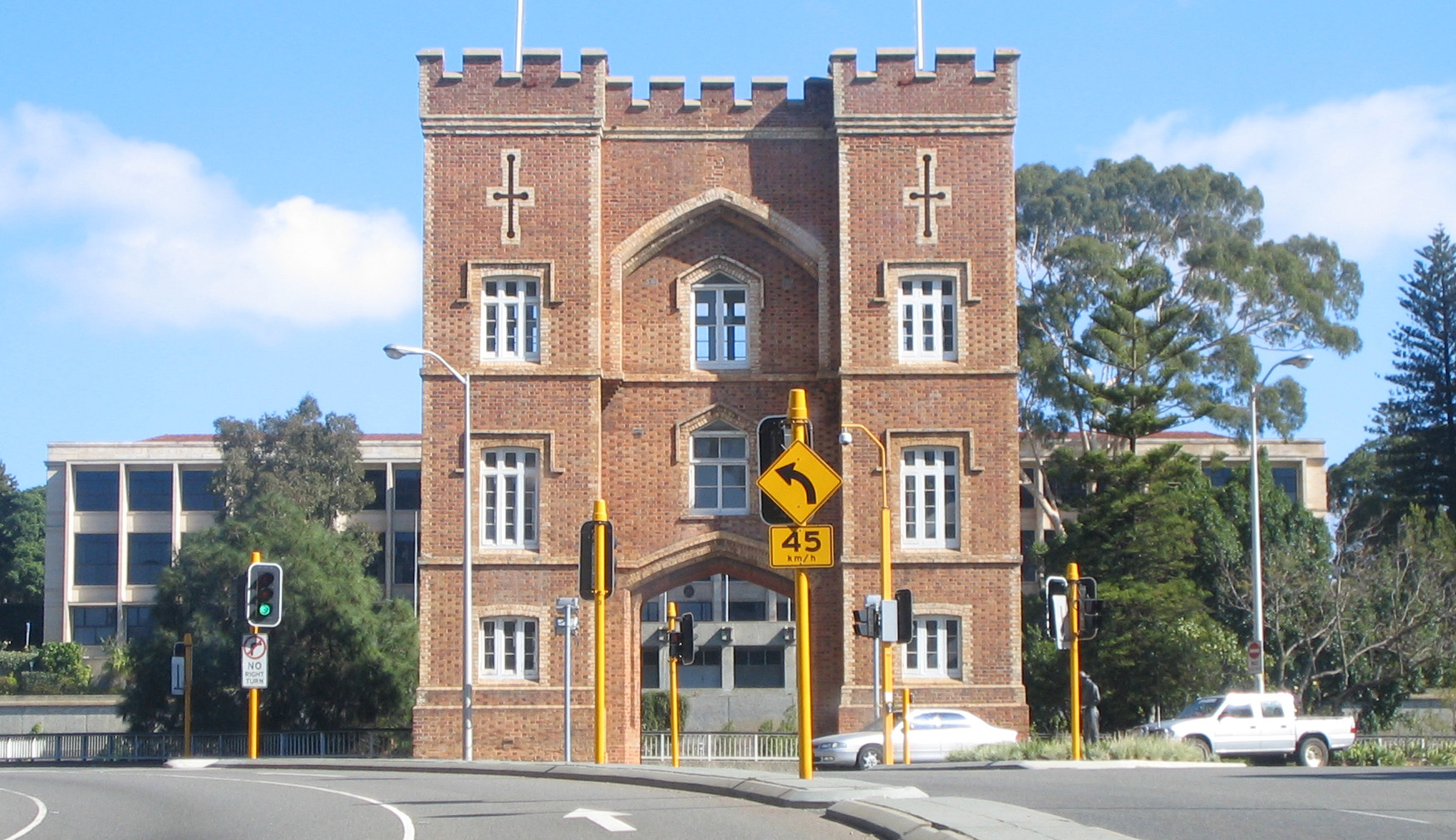
- Gate remnant of the pensioner barracks building
- Active: 1850 – c. 1900

The Pensioner Guards were English military personnel who served on convict transportation ships en route to colonial Western Australia between 1850 and 1868, and were given employment and grants of land on arrival. Their initial employment lasted for six months, or the duration of the voyage, whichever was the longer time. After this they became "pensioners" and had to serve 12 days per year as well as whenever called upon. They paraded annually in Perth at the Pensioner Barracks. Part of their purpose was to fulfil a promise by the British government to send free settlers to the colony to dilute the convicts, and to maintain law and order in the colony.

Many enlisted in the British Army as boys, around 15–17 years of age, and served in many parts of the world including India, Afghanistan, China, Crimea for about 21 years before being pensioned off. This meant a number of guards were under 40 years of age and had young families when they came to Western Australia. As an incentive they were promised a two-roomed cottage and a plot of land sufficient to grow crops, vegetables and keep livestock. It was a chance for a new and better life and a large number of families remained as settlers.

In 1858, many of the Enrolled Pensioner Guards in the colony contributed to the Indian Relief Fund that had been set up in England following the Indian Mutiny of 1857. Many of the EPGs had served in India with the British Army before their retirement. The mutiny led to the ending of the East India Company in 1858, and the establishment of the British Raj.

A settlement for the Pensioners was established near Lake Coogee in 1876, and ruins of two stone cottages from this time are extant, along with a well on the shore of the lake. This location was chosen as it lay on the main route from Fremantle to Albany, but was never popular and although a few cottages, gardens, and orchards were established the settlement did not flourish. John Hyland, James Cunningham, and John Gilbride were involved in this settlement. The site lies within the buffer zone of the Woodman Point wastewater treatment plant.

After 1880, they were known as the Enrolled Guards.

== Historical connections ==
Historical connections to pensioner guards include:

- Tunney, Western Australia, named after James Tunney, son of Sergeant John Tunney who was an enrolled pensioner guard and had settled in the area.
- Patrick Stone, a Member of the Western Australian Legislative Assembly, was enrolled pensioner guard.
- Owen Hackett was an enrolled pensioner guard, and his pensioner cottage is now heritage listed.
- Francis Kirk was an enrolled pensioner guard, and his pensioner cottage is now heritage listed.
- James Forbes was an enrolled pensioner guard, who owned property in what is now Toodyay.
- Henry Burton was an enrolled pensioner guard, who lived in the now heritage listed Eliza's Cottage.
- Bentley, Western Australia, is named after John Bentley, who – in the 1860s – supervised the building of the future Albany Highway, from a camp at Bentley Hill (now in the adjoining suburb of St James).
- The West Australian writer Joseph Healey was the son of a pensioner guard
- Fremantle shipwright Thomas William Hamilton was the son of a pension guard

== Membership ==
The strength of the force was estimated at seventy souls. Membership included the following guardsmen when Disbanded March 31, 1887. In 1857, while the 12th Regiment were still present as Garrison, at least 130 pensioner guards paid to support a Crimean war nursing fund.

- Sergeant-Major Timothy McCarthy, 18th Foot
- Sergeant John Litton, 38th Foot
- Sergeant Matthew Goodbody, 29th Foot
- Sergeant William H. Mansbridge, 14th Foot
- Lance-sergt Thomas Finnigan, A.H.C.
- Corporal Edwin Attwood, 66th Foot
- Corporal Henry D. Naylor, 13th Dragoon Guards
- Corporal John Calvert, 83rd Foot
- Lance-Corporal Michael Daley, 10th Foot
- Lance-Corporal John Seery, 43rd Foot
- Lance-Corporal Thomas Bishop, R.C. Rifles
- Private Donald McKenzie, R. Brigade
- Private George Dunn. 13th Foot
- Private Edward Green, 18th Foot
- Private Richard Barrett, ELC
- Private Patrick Farrell 88th Foot
- Private John Doyle, 55th Foot
- Private John Cadden, 27th Foot
- Private John Connolly, 29th Foot
- Private George Rutley, R.A.B. 14
- Private Patrick Meer, 89th Foot
- Private Stephen Ryan, 2nd Foot
- Private Joseph Jarvis, 5th. Foot
- Private Thomas Stewart, 87th Foot
- Private Bernard McGrath, 106th Foot
- Private Matthew Ritchie, 41st Foot
- Private James Thacker. 1st Foot
- Private Michael Kenney, 24th Foot
- Private James Teapler, 37th Foot
- Private Alexander Meeklum, 77th Foot,
- Private Michael Walsh, 10th Foot
- Private Patrick Herrick, 81st Foot
- Private Timothy Kennedy, 54th Foot
- Private Edward Delaney, 97th Foot
- Private Alexander Sweeney, B. Artillery
- Private William Ryan, 61st Foot
- Private Henry Cook, 35th Foot
- Private William KEAN, 88th Foot
- Private Daniel Carty, 21st Foot
- Private Michael Brown, 22nd Foot
- Private James Callaghan, 30th Foot
- Private John Murphy, 95th Foot
- Private Patrick Sullivan, 95th Foot
- Private Joseph Mellows, 64th Foot
- Private Hugh O'Hanlon, 57th Foot
- Private Michael Fennell 59th Foot
- Private Lawrence Byrne, 12th Foot
- Private Thomas Watson, 61st Foot
- Private Nicholas Walsh, 10th: Foot

== Other members ==
- Sergeant Robert Morgan, Royal Artillery
- Private William Butchart, 78th foot
- Private John Gallgher, 92nd foot
- Sergeant Major T McCarthy, 18th foot
- James Cunningham
- Thomas Minorgan
- William Latimer
- Sergeant Donohue, R
- Sergeant Quinn, P
- Sergeant Litton, J
- Capt M.S.Smith, 44th foot and police commissioner
- Private McGovran
- Captain Finnerty
- Private Gorman
- THomas Joseph Walsh, 50th and 95th foot
- Sergeant Haydon
- Corporal Ashworth
- Commandant Colonel Harvest (recalled to England 1878)
- Captain Bourke ('staff officer' or active professional of which force? - recalled to England 1878)
- Major Johnson (Surgeon - recalled to England 1878)

== See also ==
- Hackett's (Pensioner) Cottage
- Kirk's (Pensioner) Cottage
- Pensioner Guard Cottage
