= Sue Gordon =

Aboriginal retired magistrate

Sue Gordon AM
- Born: 1943 (age 82–83); Belele Station, Western Australia
- Education: University of Western Australia
- Occupation: Magistrate
- Children: 3

Sue Gordon AM is an Aboriginal retired magistrate from Western Australia who has been locally and nationally honoured for her work with Aboriginal people and in community affairs. She is known for being chair of the Gordon Inquiry (the Inquiry into response by government agencies to complaints of family violence and child abuse in Aboriginal communities) in 2002.

== Early life ==
Born at Belele Station, near Meekatharra, Western Australia in 1943, she was separated from her mother and family at the age of four and raised at Sister Kate's home in Queens Park, Western Australia. After leaving school, she joined the army as a full-time soldier and between 1961 and 1964 was a full-time member of the Women's Royal Australian Army Corps (WRAAC) based mostly in the eastern states.

== Administrative career ==
Following her army career she worked in various administrative positions around Australia and, in the early 1970s, started a long association with the Pilbara region, working mostly in Aboriginal Affairs with both urban and traditional people. She was awarded the National Aboriginal Overseas Study Award to study employment programs with a number of Native American communities in the United States in 1977.

She was appointed as Commissioner for Aboriginal Planning in 1986, becoming the first Aboriginal person to head a government department in Western Australia, and in 1988 was appointed as a magistrate in the Perth Children's Court, at which time she was the first full-time and first Aboriginal magistrate in the state's history.

In 1990, she was appointed as one of the first five commissioners of the Aboriginal and Torres Strait Islander Commission (ATSIC), for one year.

In 2002, she was appointed to head an inquiry into family violence and child abuse in Western Australian Aboriginal communities by the Premier of Western Australia, Geoff Gallop. The Inquiry into response by government agencies to complaints of family violence and child abuse in Aboriginal communities, which became known as the Gordon Inquiry, resulted in the closure of the controversial Swan Valley Noongar Camp. The inquiry had been instigated as a result of a November 2001 report by the State Coroner on the death of a teenage girl at the Swan Valley Camp. The coroner found that the girl had encountered "sexual violation, violence, and the ravages of alcohol and substance abuse. In desperation, and despite contact with several government agencies, she died in tragic circumstances at the age of 15". The report by the Inquiry ran to over 640 pages and made 197 findings and recommendations.

On 15 April 2004, Senator Amanda Vanstone, Minister for Indigenous Affairs appointed her as head of the new National Indigenous Council, an advisory body to the Federal Government, following the winding down of ATSIC. Following her appointment, she was interviewed and asked for her views on the Stolen Generation, and whether she would seek an apology from Prime Minister, John Howard, to which she replied: "No. I personally didn't want an apology because it should have gone to my mother. But my mother's passed away now, so it's too late. And what's an apology going to achieve now?"

Gordon chaired the Northern Territory National Emergency Response Taskforce from June 2007 to June 2008.

In 2010 she joined the Jawun board. Also that year, she accepted the position of president of the Federation of Western Australian Police and Community Youth Centres (WA PCYC) and, as of July 2017, still holds the position.

As of 2018, she was President of The Graham (Polly) Farmer Foundation, an educational not-for-profit founded in 1995.

== Honours ==
Gordon has a Bachelor of Laws (LLB) from the University of Western Australia and, in 2003, received an Honorary Degree of Doctor of Letters (Hon.DLitt) from the same university. Other awards include the Aboriginal Development Commission Australia Day Council Award in 1986, the Paul Harris Fellow from the Rotary Club of Perth in 1994 and, in 2003, the Centenary Medal for service to the community, particularly the Aboriginal community.

She received the Order of Australia award in 1993 in recognition of her work with Aboriginal people and community affairs.

== See also ==
- Select Committee on Reserves (Reserve 43131) Bill 2003
