= List of Transwa railway stations =

Railway stations in Western Australia

Transwa is a division of the Western Australian government's Public Transport Authority. It is responsible for operating public transport in regional Western Australia. It has four train services: the Australind, which goes from Perth to Bunbury; the AvonLink, which goes from Midland to Northam; the MerredinLink, which goes from Midland to Merredin; and the Prospector, which goes from East Perth to Kalgoorlie.

== List of current stations ==
List of Transwa stations
Station	Image	Served by	Town/locality	Notes
Armadale	Entrance area of Armadale station	Australind Armadale line	Armadale	Transperth station located in the Perth metropolitan region;
Bodallin		Prospector	Bodallin	
Bonnie Vale		Prospector	Bonnie Vale	
Brunswick Junction		Australind	Brunswick Junction	
Bunbury	Train at platform	Australind	East Bunbury	Southern terminus of the Australind
Burracoppin		Prospector	Burracoppin	
Byford	Small concrete platform	Australind Armadale line	Byford	Located in the Perth metropolitan region
Carrabin		Prospector	Carrabin	
Cookernup		Australind	Cookernup	
Cunderdin	Small station platform with shelter and wheat bin in the background	MerredinLink Prospector	Cunderdin	
Doodlakine		MerredinLink Prospector	Doodlakine	
East Perth	Passenger train at long platform with full length shelter	MerredinLink Prospector Airport line Midland line	East Perth	Transperth station located in the Perth metropolitan region; western terminus of the MerredinLink and the Prospector
Harvey	Station platform with wooden building	Australind	Harvey	
Hines Hill		MerredinLink Prospector	Hines Hill	
Kalgoorlie	Passenger train at station platform	Prospector	Kalgoorlie	Eastern terminus of the Prospector
Kellerberrin	Platform with small shelter	MerredinLink Prospector	Kellerberrin	
Koolyanobbing		Prospector	Koolyanobbing	
Meckering		MerredinLink Prospector	Meckering	
Merredin	Two passenger trains at station with low level side platforms	MerredinLink Prospector	Merredin	Eastern terminus of the MerredinLink
Midland		AvonLink MerredinLink Prospector Midland line	Midland	Transperth station located in the Perth metropolitan region; western terminus of the AvonLink
Moorine Rock		Prospector	Moorine Rock	
Mundijong	Small platform with shelter	Australind	Mundijong	
North Dandalup	Small metal platform and shelter	Australind	North Dandalup	
Northam	Passenger train stopped at platform	AvonLink MerredinLink Prospector	Northam	Eastern terminus of the AvonLink
Perth	Indoors station bay platform	Australind Transperth services: Airport line Armadale line Fremantle line Mandurah line Midland line Thornlie–Cockburn line Yanchep line	Perth	Transperth station located in the Perth metropolitan region; northern terminus of the Australind
Pinjarra	Several railway tracks, with small platform on the right	Australind	Pinjarra	
Serpentine	Small station platform with shelter	Australind	Serpentine	Located in the Perth metropolitan region
Southern Cross		Prospector	Southern Cross	
Tammin	Low height station platform, with small full height area	MerredinLink Prospector	Tammin	
Toodyay	Passenger train stopped at small side platform	AvonLink MerredinLink Prospector	Toodyay	
Waroona	Small platform with metal shelter	Australind	Waroona	
Yarloop	Small platform with metal shelter	Australind	Yarloop	

== See also ==
- List of Transperth railway stations
