= Cunderdin, Western Australia =

Town in the Wheatbelt region of Western Australia

Cunderdin
- Town
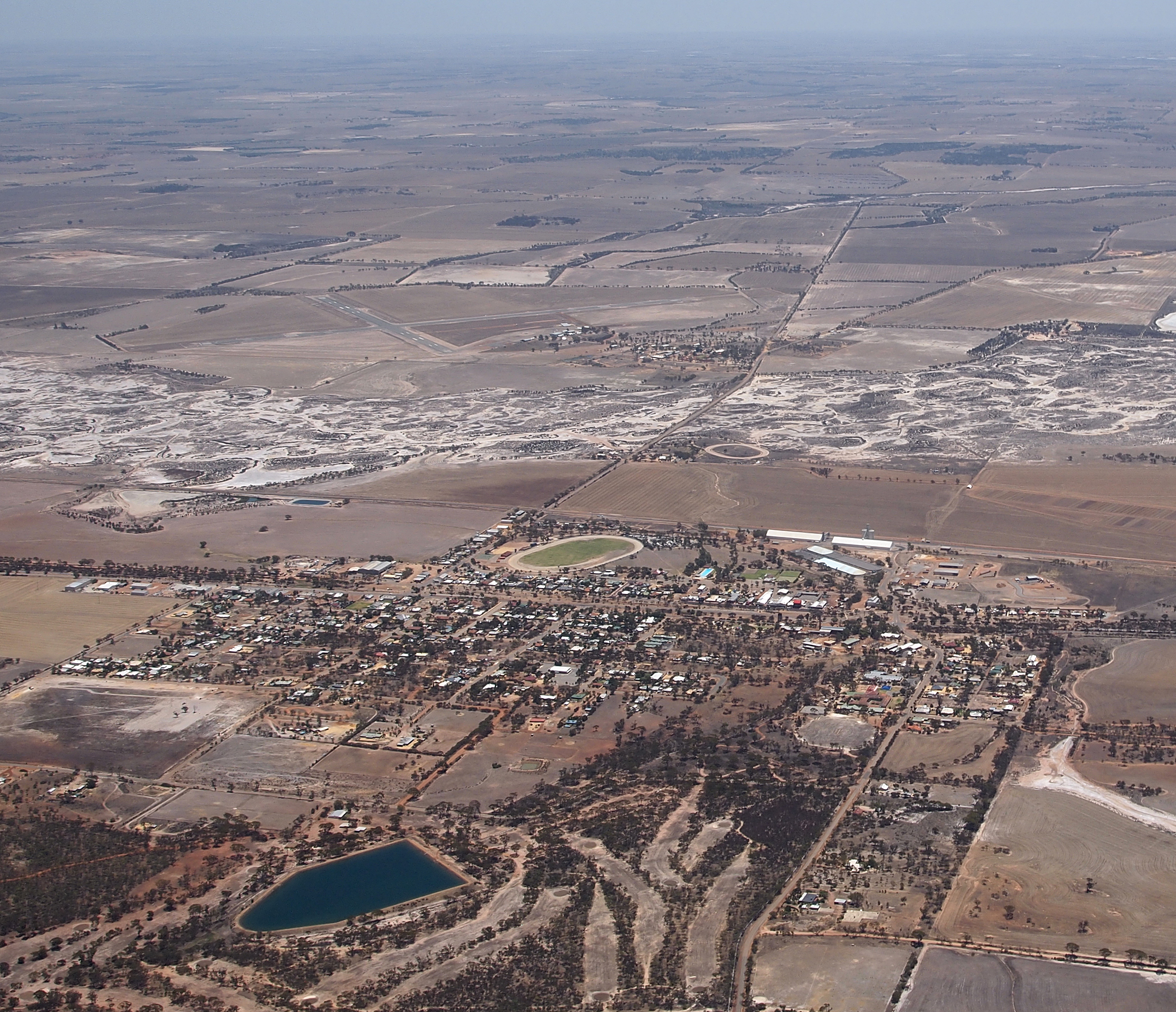
- Aerial view of Cunderdin

- Interactive map of Cunderdin
- Coordinates: 31.66°S 117.24°E
- Country: Australia
- State: Western Australia
- LGA: Shire of Cunderdin
- Location: 156 km (97 mi) east of Perth; 46 km (29 mi) west of Kellerberrin; 54 km (34 mi) south of Dowerin
- Established: 1906

Government
  - State electorate: Central Wheatbelt
  - Federal division: Durack

Area
  - Total: 331.8 km^{2} (128.1 sq mi)
- Elevation: 237 m (778 ft)

Population
  - Total: 661 (UCL 2021)
- Postcode: 6407

Cunderdin is a town in the Wheatbelt region of Western Australia 156 km east of Perth, along the Great Eastern Highway. Due to it being on the route of the Goldfields Water Supply Scheme it is also on the Golden Pipeline Heritage Trail. It is a rural community consisting of a district high school and an agricultural college.

== History ==
The Shire of Cunderdin (2014) reported the first European visitor to the area was Charles Cooke Hunt, who explored the area in 1864 and recorded the name Cunderdin, from the Nyungar Aboriginal name of a nearby hill. The meaning of the name is thought to mean either "place of the bandicoot" or "place of flowers" (Shire of Cunderdin, 2014).

Like many small towns in the area, Cunderdin developed as a stop-off town during the gold rush in the WA Goldfields (Reeves, Frost, & Fahey, 2010). Significantly in 1894 the railway arrived signalling the earliest settlement in the town (Shire of Cunderdin, 2014). In 1901 the Goldfields Water Supply Scheme, designed by C. Y. O'Connor, led to a renewed increase in population of the town (Water Corporation, 2015). The townsite was gazetted in 1906.

In 1932 the Wheat Pool of Western Australia announced that the town would have two grain elevators, each fitted with an engine, installed at the railway siding. An elevator was duly erected the following year next to the Westralian Farmers grain-shed.

In late 1933 the local tennis courts were first opened in front of a crowd of about 100 players, a tournament was held the same afternoon. The local hospital also had an X-ray plant installed and commissioned a week later.

== Education ==
=== Cunderdin Agricultural College ===
Cunderdin Agricultural College is formally known as the Western Australian College of Agriculture Cunderdin- WACoA (Western Australian College of Agriculture Cunderdin, 2015). According to the Department of Education the college has well-maintained facilities for practical agricultural training, the trade training centre, an academic classroom area, and a residential campus which houses 125-year 11 and 12 students. The Shire of Cunderdin (2014) states The Western Australian College of Agriculture is located 158 km east of Perth and is a part of the wheatbelt region. It is one of the five recognised public agricultural colleges of Western Australia, and Cunderdin was awarded WA Secondary School of the year in 2014 (Department of Education, 2015) According to the Department of Education (2015) the college has been successful in winning the national award for vocational education in schools excellence. The secondary school of the year report by the Department of Education (2015) found an average Australian Tertiary Admission Rank for the agricultural college of 39.6 in 2011, increasing to 62.7 in 2012. The Department of Regional Development (2014) states with the funding from the Royalties for Regions and Department of Education, the college farm will expand by more than 1000 hectares to provide better education opportunities for students within the cropping and livestock sectors. This will result in the college farm holding more than 3000 hectares, with the addition of the additional 1000 arable hectares (Department of Regional Development). The Department of Education (2015) acknowledges that all students graduating from WACoA gain two or more Australian Quality Training Framework qualifications and complete a range of short courses to obtain their OH&S cards, certificates in chemical safety, bush fire fighting courses, firearm safety certificates and senior first aid qualifications. Students are given the opportunity to present their work and talents throughout a range of shows such as Dowerin Field Day, Wagin Woolorama, the Perth Royal Show and other community days held by small town shires in the Wheatbelt (Department of Education, 2015). These shows enable students to be a part of the shearing team, led steer team, fencing team and other trade subjects such as furnishings and engineering, where their achievements and efforts are recognised within the community through local newspapers and college newsletters (Department of Education). The Department of Education (2015) suggests the agricultural college provides students with excellent facilities, resulting in many awards and commendations for the level of training provided and maintains a good status holding an annual open day with approximately 600 people each year.

== Population ==
Year	Male	Female	Total
2002	781	641	1422
2003	765	627	1392
2004	749	609	1358
2005	736	598	1334
2006	722	586	1306
2007			1295
2008			1295
2009			1295
2010			1322
2011			1347
2012			1339
2013			1302

Source: Australian Bureau of Statistics, 2016

== Economy ==
=== Cunderdin Airstrip ===
The Cunderdin Airstrip is situated in the middle of the college farm at the Western Australian College of Agriculture and still functions today. (Western Australian College of Agriculture Cunderdin, 2015). According to the Shire of Cunderdin (2014) the airstrip was built early in the Second World War and was designed as a RAAF flying school base and as a bomber during war. In the later stages of the War, the airstrip became known as the No 25 Squadron, which was used for operating Liberator bombers and kept well maintained so it could be of use in later years (RAAF Museum, 2009). In 1941, the airstrip was formally known as the No 9 Elementary Flying Training School and consisted of 34 officers, 500 airmen, and 51 aircraft (Shire of Cunderdin, 2014). The RAAF Museum (2009) explains how the aircraft base in Cunderdin was important for any aircraft flying from Perth to Australia's east coast. The Shire of Cunderdin (2014) claims the airstrip, among others, to play a major role in the success of the town. The airstrip is now owned by the Shire and has the newly constructed aerodrome complex. (Gliding Club of Western Australia, 2015). It is run, and maintained by the Gliding Club of Western Australia and includes housing for those using it over an extended period of time (Shire of Cunderdin, 2014). Among that, the Automatic Weather Station (AWS) has a station set up at the airfield to gain results for the weather such as rainfall, temperature and other important figures (Shire of Cunderdin, 2014).

== Farming ==
Cunderdin is a predominantly agricultural based town with nearby farms surrounding town and the Agricultural College. The statistics from the Australian Bureau of Statistics (2016) state in 2011 661, 701 hectares of land was occupied by the holding of agricultural commodities. The Australian Bureau of Statistics (2016) reported in 2011 there was a count of 4,726 cattle, 382,929 sheep, and 2,624 pigs in a part of the agricultural sector in Cunderdin farms. The Agricultural College sows and harvests wheat, barley, canola, field peas and oats each year (Western Australian College of Agriculture Cunderdin, 2015).

The Golden Pipeline runs through Cunderdin and provides water for the town (Shire of Cunderdin, 2014). According to the Water Corporation (2015) 40% of the water in the pipeline is delivered to the agricultural area, including Cunderdin. Cunderdin is one of 24 pump stations running through the pipe (Water Corporation, 2015). Based on Baxter road is the project combination of GRDC (Grains Research and Development Corporation) and DAFWA (Department of Agriculture and Food) named WANTFA (Grains Research and Development Corporation, 2015). WANTFA stands for the Western Australian No-Tillage Farmers Association and is an organisation set up to study and experiment with broad acre cropping systems (WANTFA, 2015). WANTFA was initiated in 1992, and is known to be the largest grower group in Western Australia (WANTFA, 2015). The Shire of Cunderdin, 2014 suggests the agricultural sector of the town contributes heavily to the success of the town and with the trials planted around the community; the results and future of agriculture will increase over the years.

== Places of interest ==
- Cunderdin Museum - based in the former Pumping Station Number Three for the Goldfields Water Supply Scheme
- Cunderdin Hill Lookout – panoramic views of the area
- Railway Water Tower
- Cunderdin Golf Course, which is situated next to the Cunderdin Reservoir, itself part of the Goldfields water supply scheme
- Cunderdin Pool
- Historic sites of Youndigin and Doodenanning
- Cunderdin Town Oval
- Golden Pipeline
- C Y O'Connor Park

=== Youndegin ===
Youndegin is a historic site along the Cunderdin- Quairading road, just 19 km south of Cunderdin town and represents the first settlement in the area (Shire of Cunderdin, 2014). Following the death of E.J. Clarkson, an early settler in the Cunderdin district, the old original police output was constructed from stone and mud with a thatched roof (Shire of Cunderdin, 2014). The Shire of Cunderdin (2014) suggested Constable Allerly was the original police officer in the area who took charge of the post and kept watch for any crime, however in 1880, Constable Alfred Eaton arrived into Cunderdin and took over running the station and along with his wife. It was found by the Shire of Cunderdin (2014) that the popular delicacy of the time in the area was parrot pie. When the railway was built Constable Eaton left the police force and became the first farmer within the Cunderdin district.

== Flora ==
Cunderdin daviesia (Daviesiacunderdin) is a small to medium-sized shrub, which grows to 1.6 m high. It appears that it is isolated to the Cunderdin area.

== Climate ==
Climate data for Cunderdin
Month	Jan	Feb	Mar	Apr	May	Jun	Jul	Aug	Sep	Oct	Nov	Dec	Year
Record high °C (°F)	46.0 (114.8)	48.0 (118.4)	43.2 (109.8)	38.1 (100.6)	35.0 (95.0)	26.0 (78.8)	25.3 (77.5)	30.3 (86.5)	34.7 (94.5)	38.8 (101.8)	44.1 (111.4)	45.6 (114.1)	48.0 (118.4)
Mean daily maximum °C (°F)	34.0 (93.2)	33.3 (91.9)	30.5 (86.9)	25.6 (78.1)	21.1 (70.0)	17.7 (63.9)	16.6 (61.9)	17.5 (63.5)	20.4 (68.7)	24.3 (75.7)	28.5 (83.3)	32.0 (89.6)	25.1 (77.2)
Mean daily minimum °C (°F)	17.3 (63.1)	17.5 (63.5)	15.8 (60.4)	12.8 (55.0)	9.4 (48.9)	7.4 (45.3)	6.1 (43.0)	5.9 (42.6)	7.1 (44.8)	9.3 (48.7)	12.5 (54.5)	15.3 (59.5)	11.4 (52.5)
Record low °C (°F)	7.1 (44.8)	7.6 (45.7)	5.0 (41.0)	2.2 (36.0)	−0.6 (30.9)	−2.2 (28.0)	−3.1 (26.4)	−1.0 (30.2)	−0.5 (31.1)	1.0 (33.8)	2.3 (36.1)	4.4 (39.9)	−3.1 (26.4)
Average precipitation mm (inches)	12.5 (0.49)	16.4 (0.65)	19.1 (0.75)	23.9 (0.94)	47.5 (1.87)	63.5 (2.50)	62.8 (2.47)	47.3 (1.86)	27.6 (1.09)	20.4 (0.80)	13.5 (0.53)	10.0 (0.39)	363.8 (14.32)
Average precipitation days	2.0	2.4	3.1	4.9	8.9	12.6	13.8	11.6	8.3	5.7	3.5	2.3	79.1
Average relative humidity (%)	27	31	34	43	52	62	63	58	50	39	32	28	43
Source 1:
Source 2:

== Rail services ==
Transwa's MerredinLink and Prospector services stop at Cunderdin, at least one service each day.

Preceding station	Transwa	Following station
Meckering towards East Perth	MerredinLink	Tammin towards Merredin
Meckering towards East Perth	Prospector	Tammin towards Kalgoorlie
