= WAGR WCA/WCE class =

1971 Western Australian train

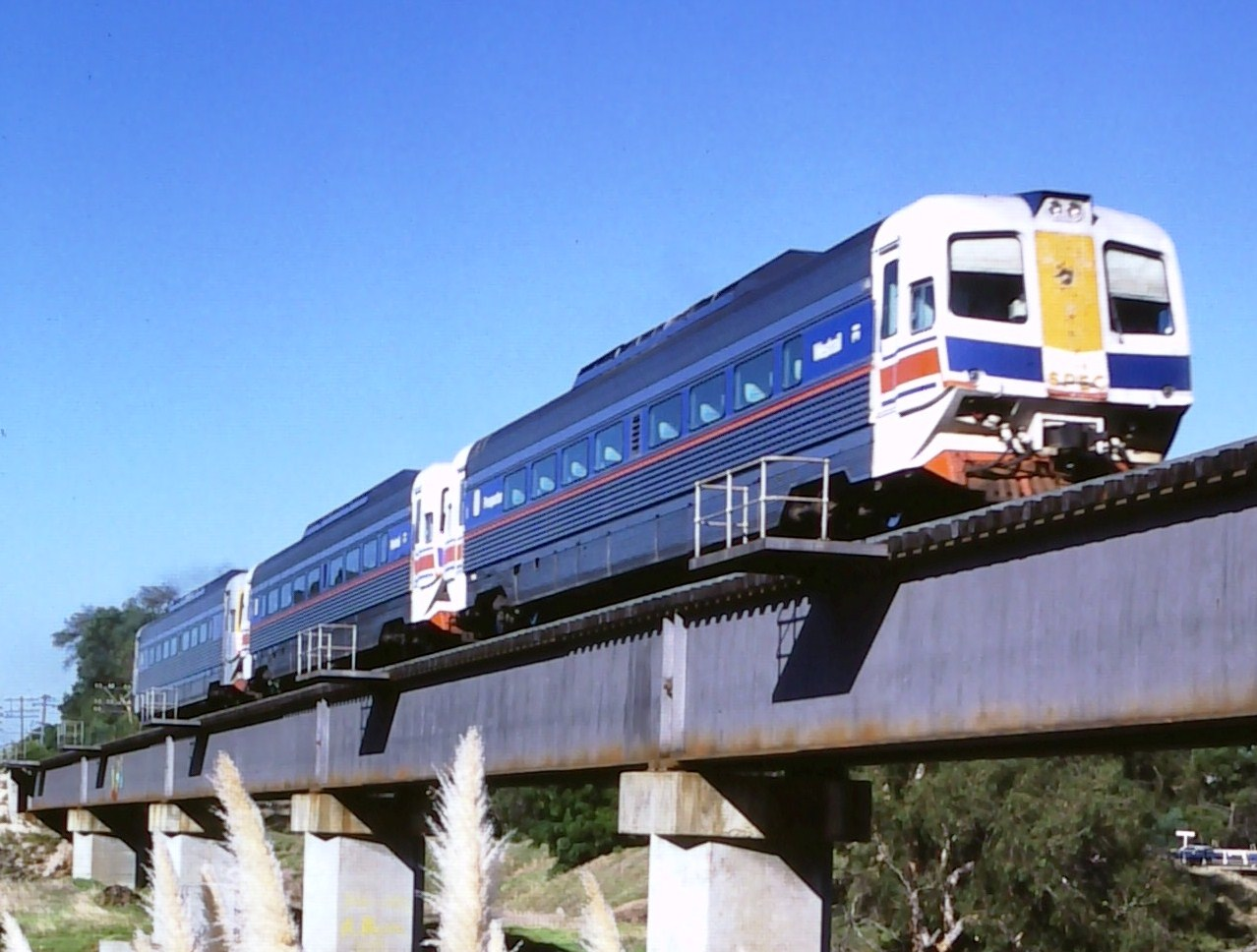
- The Prospector crossing the Swan River at the Guildford Railway Bridge in April 1986
- Stock type: Diesel multiple unit
- Manufacturer: Comeng
- Built at: Granville, New South Wales
- Entered service: 1971
- Number built: 8
- Number preserved: 2
- Number scrapped: 6
- Fleet numbers: WCA901–WCA905; WCE921–WCE923
- Operators: WAGR (1971–1975); Westrail (1975–2000); WAGR Commission (2000–2003); Transwa (2003–2005)

Specifications
- Car length: 27.43 m (90 ft 0 in)
- Maximum speed: 150 km/h (93 mph)
- Prime movers: MAN D3650 HM6U x2 (as built); Cummins KTA19R x2 (from early 1990s)
- Power output: 270 kW (360 hp)
- Transmission: Voith T113R
- Auxiliaries: Leyland 401
- Track gauge: 1,435 mm (4 ft 8 1/2 in) standard gauge

The WCA class railcars and WCE class trailers are a class of diesel multiple unit built by train manufacturer Comeng at Granville for the Western Australian Government Railways (WAGR) in 1971 to operate the new Prospector service between East Perth and Kalgoorlie. At the time of their construction, the WCA class units were the longest and fastest diesel railcars in the world, with the ability to reach speeds of up to 150 kilometres per hour (93 mph).

== History ==
In 1968 Comeng, Granville were awarded a contract to build five WCA power cars and three WCE non-powered trailers. The WCAs had a crew compartment at both ends, the WCEs at one end. They were ordered to operate the new The Prospector service, on the Eastern Goldfields Railway between East Perth and Kalgoorlie that was in the process of being converted to standard gauge.

Built to take advantage of the generous loading gauge of the new line, they were the largest carriages ever built in Australia. As they were too large to be hauled on the New South Wales Government Railways network east of Parkes or travel by road over the Blue Mountains, they were transported from Sydney by road to Parkes on a circuitous route via Goulburn and Temora, from where they continued their journey by rail.

All of the WCA class vehicles were powered by MAN engines coupled to Voith transmissions. In the early 1990s, these engines were replaced by Cummins KTA19R engines. At 27.43 metres and with a top speed of 150 km/h, the WCAs were the longest and fastest diesel railcars in the world. The trains made up of the WCA/WCE class units were the first in Australia to have at-seat catering and up until their withdrawal, operated the highest average speed train service in Australia.

On 24 September 1995 they began to operate AvonLink services between East Perth and Northam.

They travelled over 20,000,000 kilometres (12,000,000 mi) and carried 2.6 million passengers over 33 years before being replaced by the Transwa WDA/WDB/WDC class railcars with the last retired in July 2005. These held the record for the highest speed attained by an Australian train until bettered by a New South Wales XPT in September 1981.

WCA 903 and WCE 922 ran the last service of their class on 31 July 2005 on the East Perth to Northam "AvonLink" service. These last two carriages have been offered to Rail Heritage WA for preservation with the other six remaining carriages were scrapped.
