= Acacia phaeocalyx =

Conservation status
- Priority Three — Poorly Known Taxa (DEC)

Scientific classification
- Kingdom: Plantae
- Clade: Tracheophytes
- Clade: Angiosperms
- Clade: Eudicots
- Clade: Rosids
- Order: Fabales
- Family: Fabaceae
- Subfamily: Caesalpinioideae
- Clade: Mimosoid clade
- Genus: Acacia
- Species: A. phaeocalyx

Binomial name
- Acacia phaeocalyx Maslin
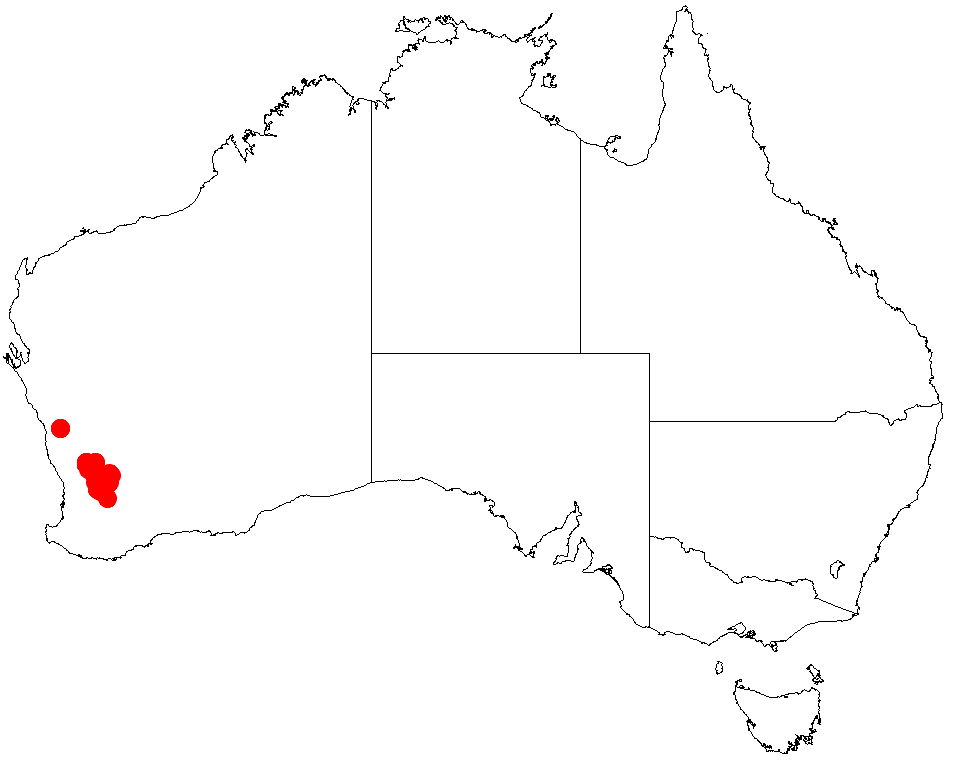
- Occurrence data from AVH

Species of legume

Acacia phaeocalyx is a shrub belonging to the genus Acacia and the subgenus Phyllodineae that is endemic to south western Australia.

== Description ==
The spreading and pungent shrub typically grows to a height of 0.3 to 0.6 metres (1.0 to 2.0 ft). It can have an intricate, sprawling or compact habit and has glabrous branchlets that are often covered in a fine white powdery coating and have spiny stipules that are 2 to 4 mm (0.079 to 0.157 in) in length and shallowly recurved. Like most species of Acacia it has phyllodes rather than true leaves. The pungent, coriaceous and green dimidiate phyllodes are widest below or near or below the middle and are 8 to 15 mm (0.31 to 0.59 in) in length and 6 to 11 mm (0.24 to 0.43 in) in width with a midrib near the abaxial margin. It blooms from April to June and produces yellow flowers. The simple inflorescences occur singly in the axils with spherical flower-heads that contain seven to eight loosely packed flowers. Following flowering coriaceous-crustaceous, red-brown seed pods form that are shallowly curved and longitudinally striated. The terete pods are usually up to around 7 cm (2.8 in) in length and have a diameter of about 4 mm (0.16 in). The dark brown seeds inside have an oblong shape with a length of 4 to 5 mm (0.16 to 0.20 in) with a conical terminal aril.

== Taxonomy ==
The species was first formally described by the botanist Bruce Maslin in 1978 as part of the work Studies in the genus Acacia (Mimosaceae) - A revision of the Uninerves - Triangulares, in part (the tetramerous species) as published in the journal Nuytsia. It was reclassified as Racosperma phaeocalyx by Leslie Pedley in 2003 then transferred back to genus Acacia in 2006.

== Distribution ==
It is native to an area in the central Wheatbelt region of Western Australia where it is commonly situated on plains and hillsides growing in sandy soils usually over or around laterite. The bulk of the population is found between Wongan Hills in the north west and Kellerberrin in the south east where it is usually a part of scrub and tall shrubland communities.

== See also ==
- List of Acacia species
