= Tammin, Western Australia =

Tammin
- Town
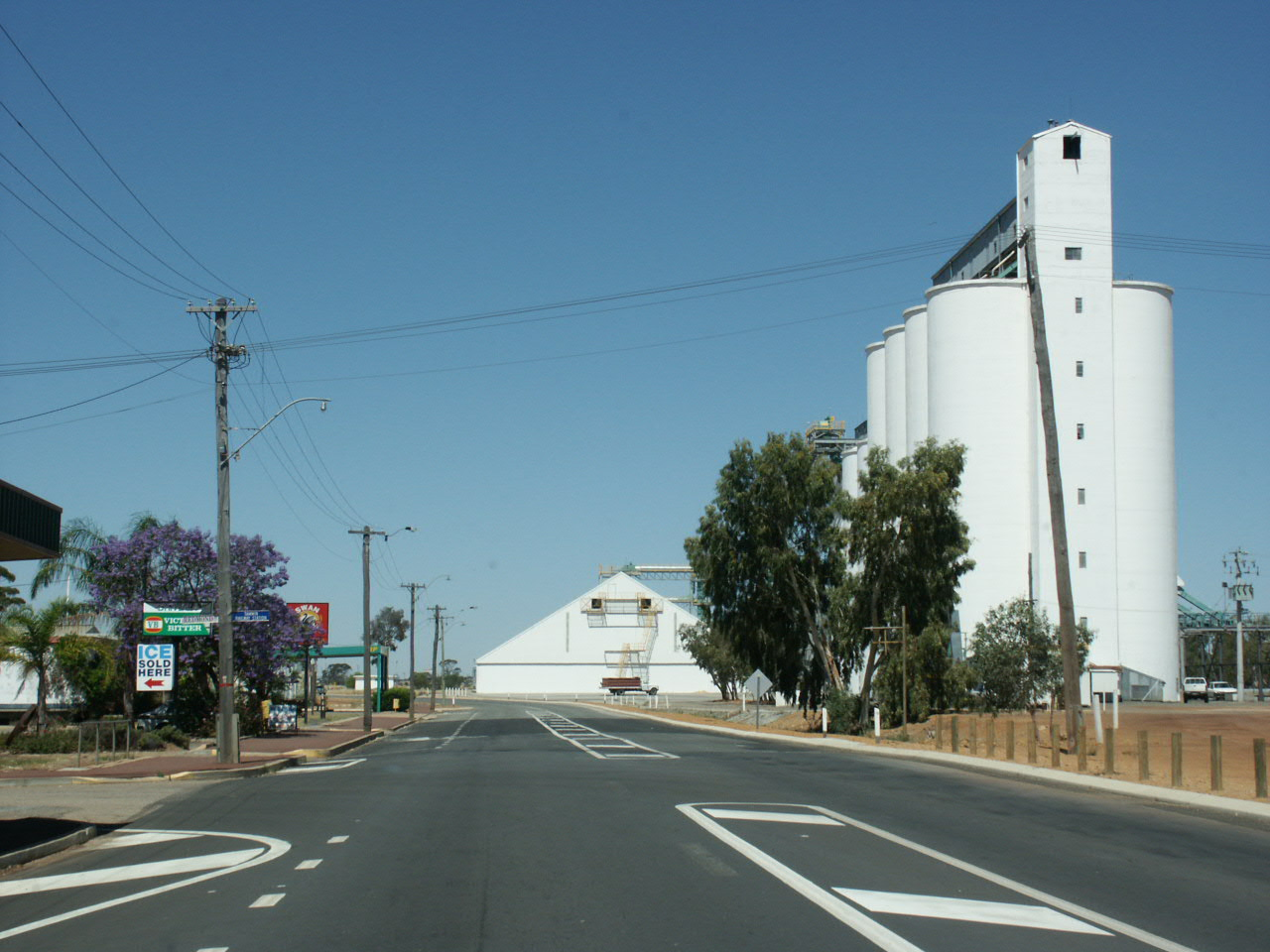
- Tammin townsite

- Interactive map of Tammin
- Coordinates: 31°38′00″S 117°29′00″E
- Country: Australia
- State: Western Australia
- LGA: Shire of Tammin
- Location: 184 km (114 mi) east of Perth; 22 km (14 mi) west of Kellerberrin; 24 km (15 mi) east of Cunderdin
- Established: 1899

Government
  - State electorate: Central Wheatbelt
  - Federal division: Durack

Area
  - Total: 0.8 km^{2} (0.31 sq mi)
- Elevation: 311 m (1,020 ft)

Population
  - Total: 129 (SAL 2021)
- Postcode: 6409

Tammin is a town in the central agricultural region of Western Australia, 184 kilometres (114 mi) east of Perth and midway between the towns of Cunderdin and Kellerberrin on the Great Eastern Highway.

The surrounding areas produce wheat and other cereal crops. The town is a receival site for Cooperative Bulk Handling.

It also serves as a stop on the Prospector and MerredinLink rural train services.

== History ==
The first European to settle in the area was John Packham in 1893. The railway to Southern Cross was constructed through the area in 1894–95, and Tammin was one of the original stations when the line opened in 1895. As the surrounding area developed for agriculture, there was sufficient demand for land in the area for the government to declare a townsite, and the Tammin townsite was gazetted in 1899.

Tammin is an Aboriginal name derived from the nearby Tammin Rock, a name first recorded by the explorer Charles Cooke Hunt in 1864. The rock possibly derives its name from the "Tammar", the Aboriginal name of the "black gloved wallaby", which was once found in this area. Another source records it as possibly meaning "a grandmother or a grandfather".

The local Agricultural Hall was opened in 1911 by the Minister of Agriculture.

In 1932 the Wheat Pool of Western Australia announced that the town would have two grain elevators, each fitted with an engine, installed at the railway siding.

== Rail services ==
Transwa's MerredinLink and Prospector services stop at Tammin, at least one service each day.

Preceding station	Transwa	Following station
Cunderdin towards East Perth	MerredinLink	Kellerberrin towards Merredin
Cunderdin towards East Perth	Prospector	Kellerberrin towards Kalgoorlie
