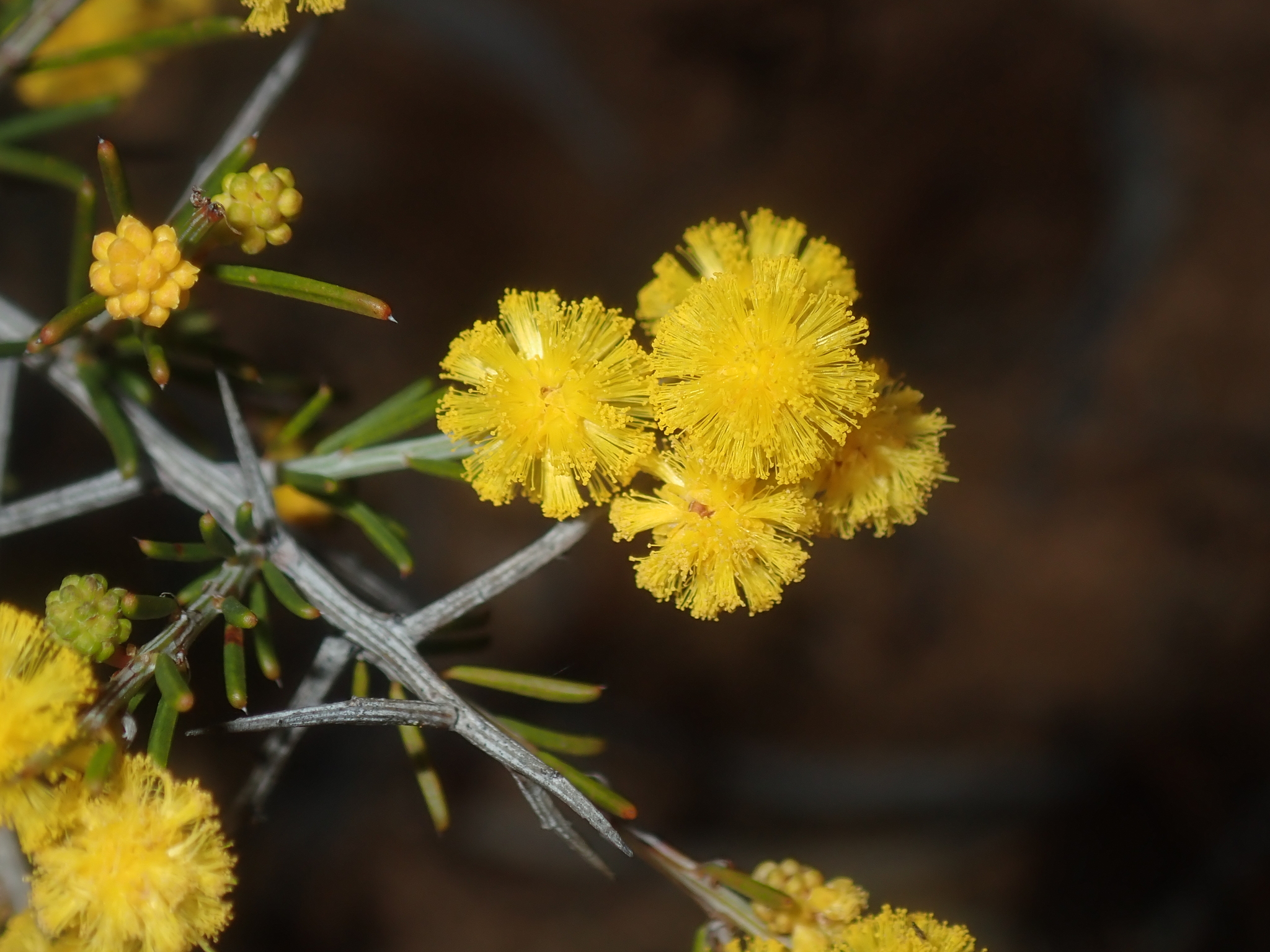

Scientific classification
- Kingdom: Plantae
- Clade: Embryophytes
- Clade: Tracheophytes
- Clade: Spermatophytes
- Clade: Angiosperms
- Clade: Eudicots
- Clade: Rosids
- Order: Fabales
- Family: Fabaceae
- Subfamily: Caesalpinioideae
- Clade: Mimosoid clade
- Genus: Acacia
- Species: A. ulicina

Binomial name
- Acacia ulicina Meisn.
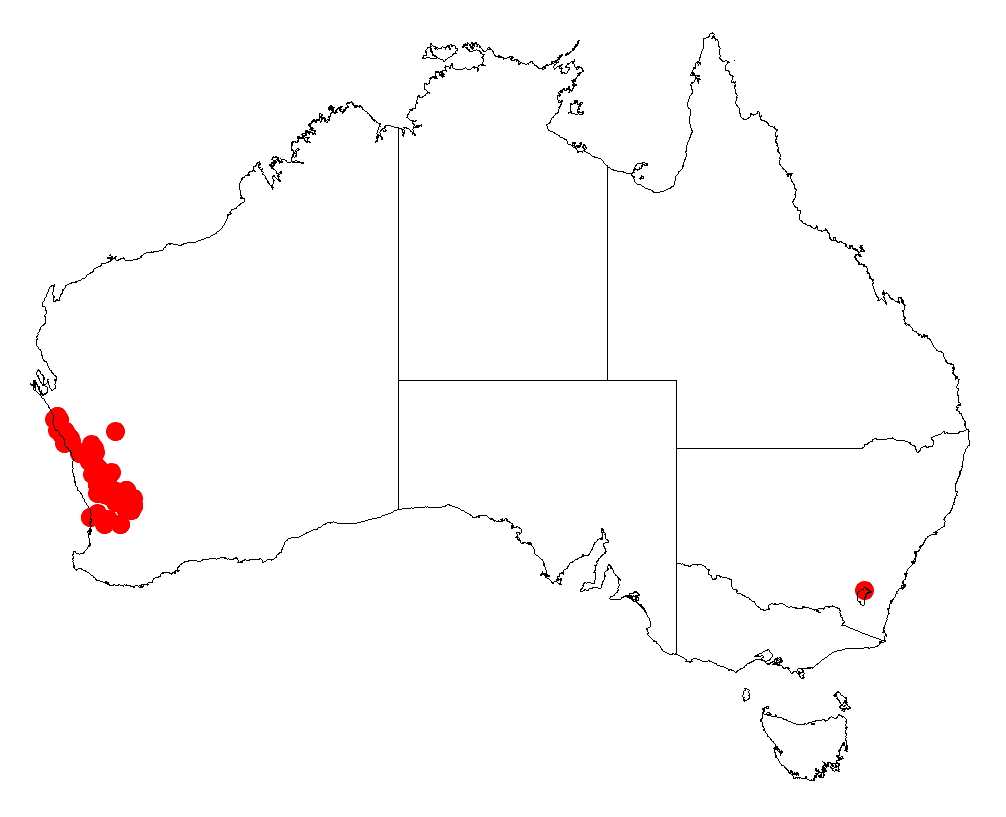
- Occurrence data from AVH

= Acacia ulicina =

Species of legume

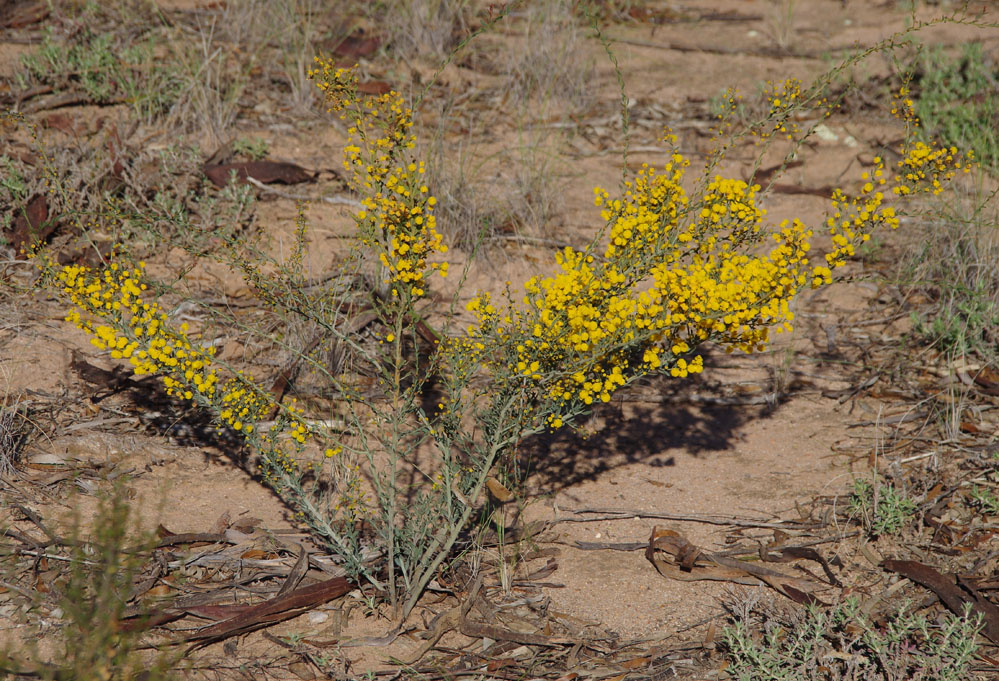
Habit

Acacia ulicina is a species of shrub in the family Fabaceae that is endemic to western Australia.

== Description ==
The rigid spreading prickly shrub typically grows to a height of 0.3 to 1.0 metre (1 to 3 ft). It has striated branches that have a powdery white coating between the ribs. The branches divide down to many short, spinescent, aphyllous branchlets. The flat, linear and erect phyllodes have a length of 7 to 15 mm (0.28 to 0.59 in) and a width of 0.5 to 1.5 mm (0.020 to 0.059 in) and a raised midrib. It blooms from July to September and produces yellow flowers. The rudimentary inflorescences occur singly per raceme and have spherical to shortly obloid flower-heads with a diameter of 4.5 to 5.5 mm (0.18 to 0.22 in) containing 15 to 25 golden flowers. The curved, coriaceous, dark brown seed pods that form after flowering and constricted between and the rounded over seeds. The pods are around 4 cm (1.6 in) in length and have a width of 2.5 to 3.5 mm (0.098 to 0.138 in) and contain khaki coloured ovate shaped seeds.

== Distribution ==
It is native to an area in the Wheatbelt and Mid West regions of Western Australia where it grows in gravelly lateritic clay-loam soils. The shrub is situated from around Kalbarri in the north and extends south east to around Tammin and Brookton.

== See also ==
- List of Acacia species
