= List of railway stations in Perth =

List of railway stations in Perth may refer to:

- List of Transperth railway stations
- List of Transwa railway stations
