= Midland railway station, Perth =

Railway station in Perth, Western Australia

Midland
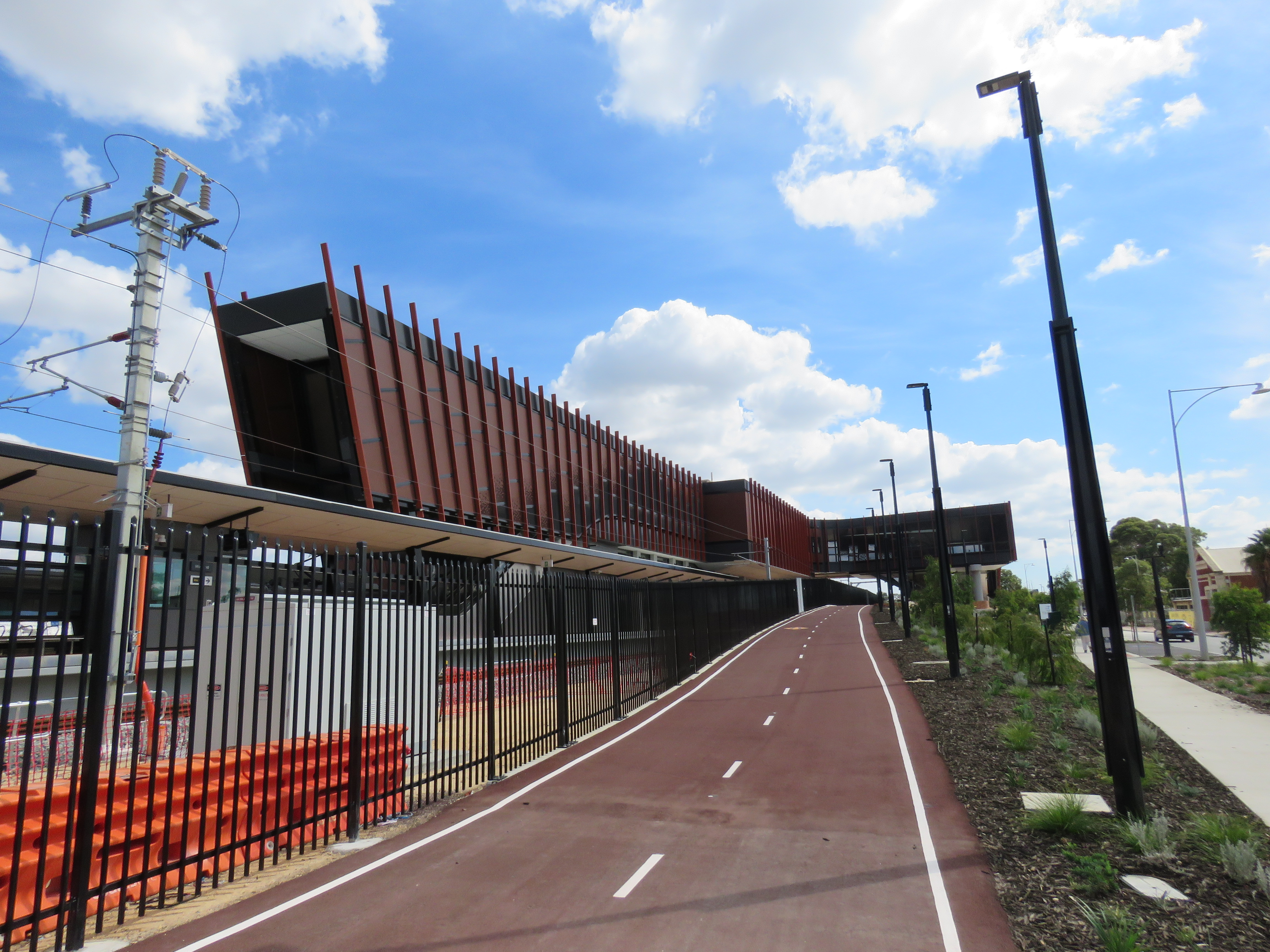
- New Midland railway station, which opened in February 2026

General information
- Location: Railway Parade, Midland; Australia
- Coordinates: 31°53′33″S 116°00′12″E
- Owner: Public Transport Authority
- Operator: Transperth
- Line: Midland line
- Distance: 16.42 kilometres from Perth
- Platforms: 3 (1 island, 1 side)
- Tracks: 5 (3 passenger, 2 freight)
- Connections: Bus

Construction
- Structure type: Ground
- Parking: Yes
- Accessible: Yes

Other information
- Status: Staffed
- Station code: MMD
- Fare zone: 2

History
- Opened: 8 October 1968
- Closed: 22 January 2026
- Rebuilt: 22 February 2026

Passengers
- 2013-14: 1,125,120

Services
Preceding station	Transperth	Following station
Woodbridge towards Perth	Midland line	Terminus
Preceding station	Transwa	Following station
East Perth Terminus	AvonLink	Toodyay towards Northam, Merredin or Kalgoorlie
East Perth Terminus	MerredinLink	Toodyay towards Northam, Merredin or Kalgoorlie
East Perth Terminus	Prospector	Toodyay towards Northam, Merredin or Kalgoorlie
Track layout
Location

Midland railway station is a station and the terminus of the Midland line in Perth. Western Australia. It is operated by Transperth and is connected with the feeder bus services that utilise the adjacent bus terminal in Midland and by Transwa regional coach and rail services.

== History ==
=== Original station ===
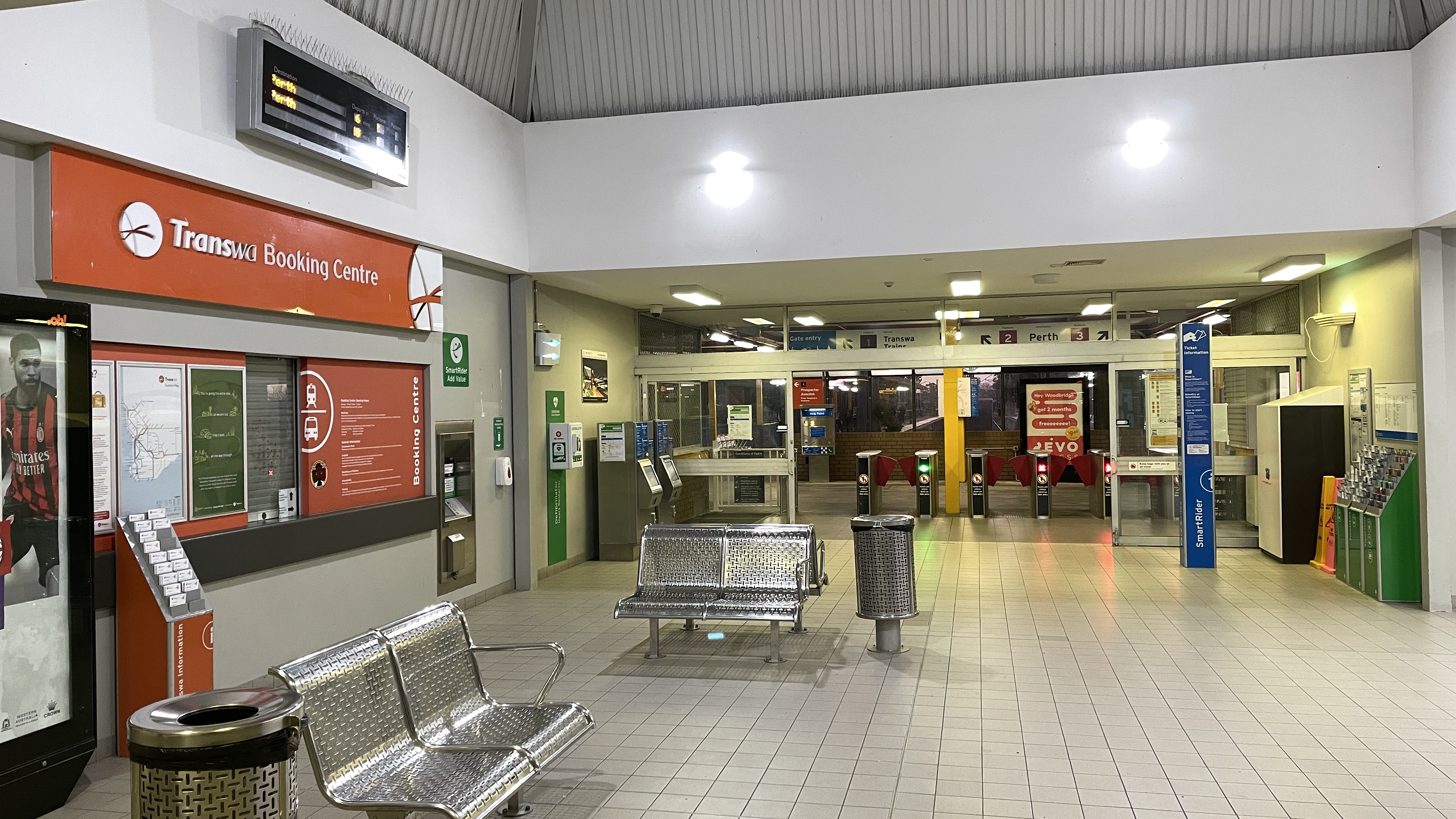
Station concourse

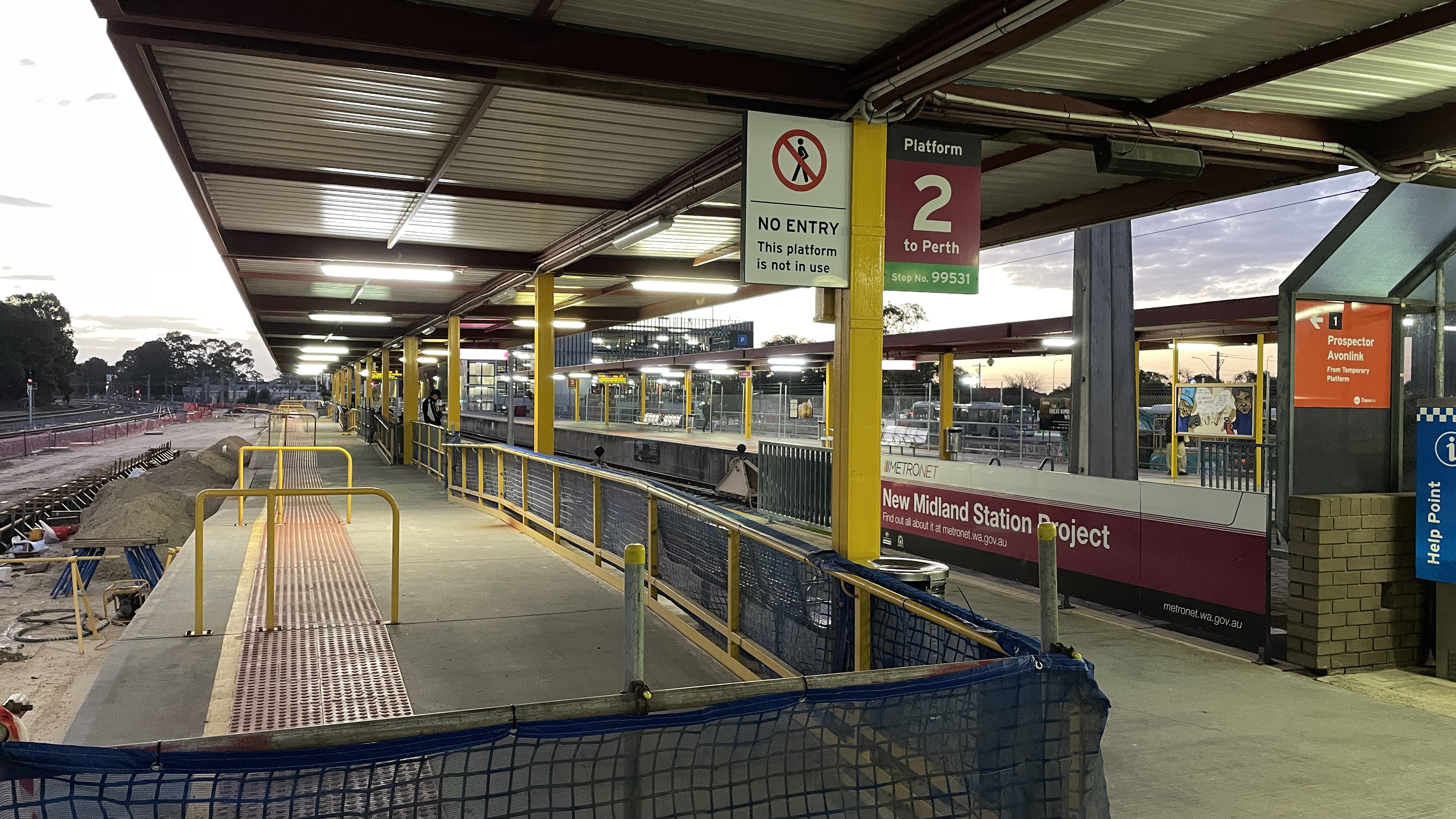
Former Platform 1

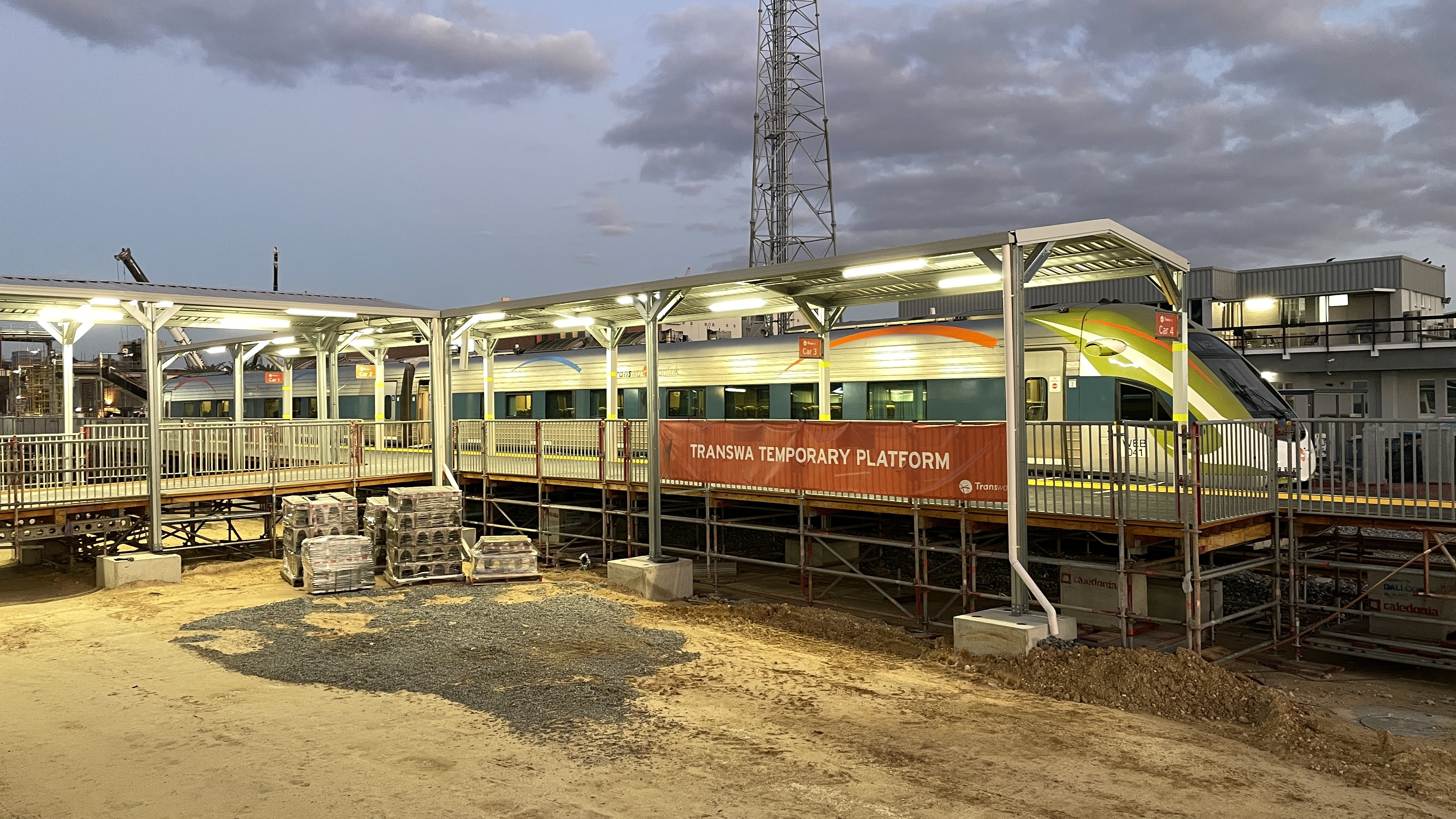
Temporary Transwa platform

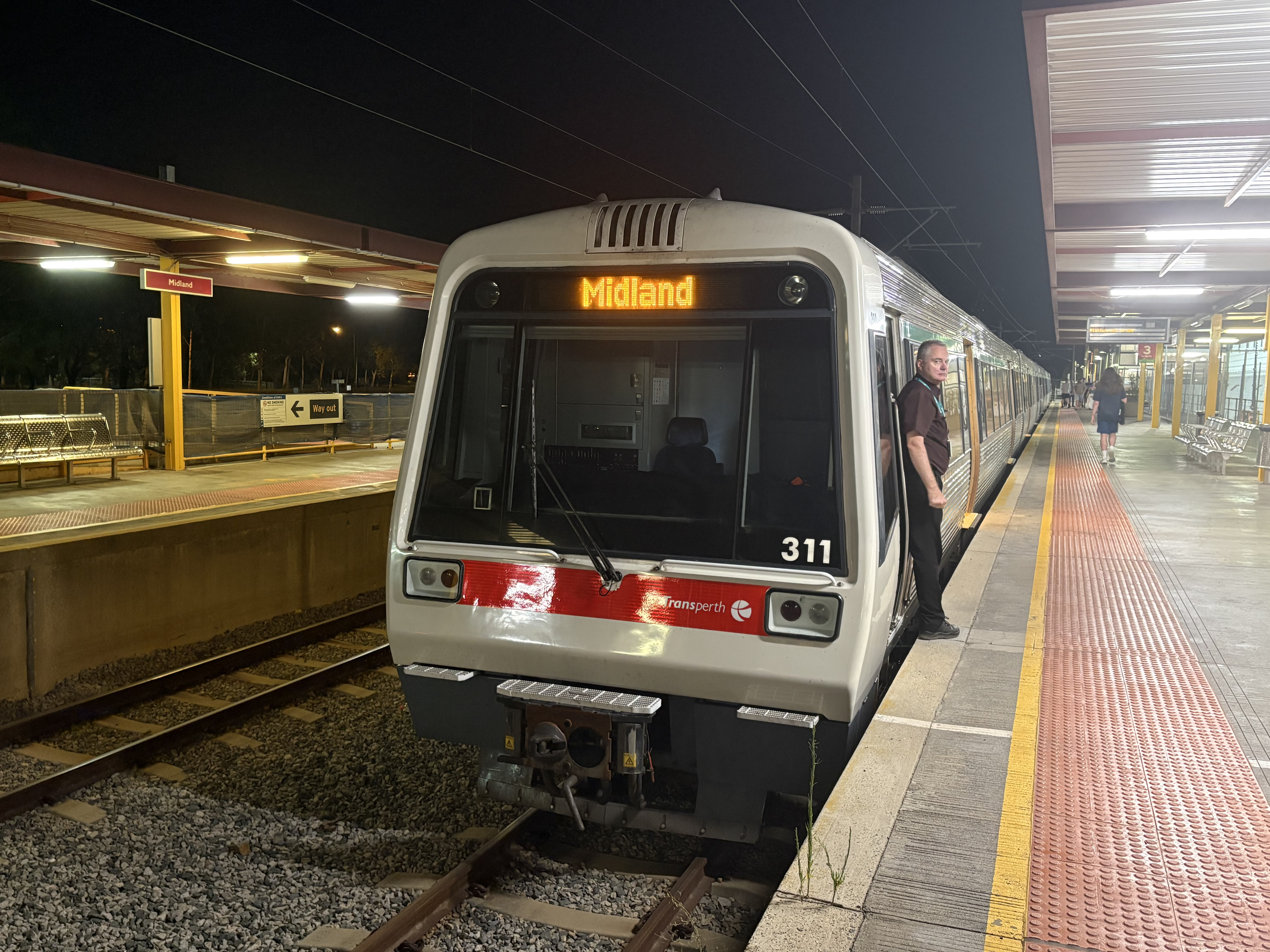
Last train at the 1968 station

Midland station was originally opened on 8 October 1968 by Minister for Transport & Railways Ray O'Connor as a replacement for Midland Junction station when the main Eastern Railway was being converted to dual gauge.

It originally had four narrow gauge platform faces, platform 1 at the southern side allowed through-running for regional services, while platforms 2-4 were terminating tracks. In the 1990s, the track was removed from platform 4 at the northern side. Initially, a separate platform was provided for the standard gauge line approximately 150 metres (490 ft) away to the west. From 18 February 2001, the through-running platform 1 was converted to dual gauge to allow the Prospector (and other future standard gauge trains) to call at the main station.

=== Redevelopment plans ===
In the 2010s the former Midland Redevelopment Authority (MRA) had advocated the relocation of the station east to be in line with Cale Street, the site of the original Midland Junction station. The MRA also desired an extension of the Midland line to Bellevue, which would take on a primarily park and ride function, to allow for land around Midland station to be redeveloped. There have been previous attempts to extend the line to Bellevue.

As part of Metronet, Midland Station was to be demolished and replaced with a new station located to the east between Helena and Cale streets. The relocation of the station was required to accommodate the extension to Bellevue, where a new railcar manufacturing facility is located. A multi-storey car park with over 600 bays and a 12 stand bus interchange were planned to make use of the former station site. As part of the project, the level crossing at

Helena Street was closed and replaced with a new crossing at Cale Street.

=== Current station ===
Construction on the new station began on 23 July 2023. The last Transwa service to use the original platform 1 was on 24 October 2024, with all standard gauge regional trains using a temporary platform located nearby.

Between 3 January and 22 February 2026, all services on the MerredinLink and Prospector did not serve the station with all services on the AvonLink service being temporarily extended to East Perth Terminal, due to the closure and dismantling of the temporary regional platform necessary for the final rail realignment.

The old station closed on 22 January 2026, followed by a 31 day shutdown of the Midland Line between Bassendean and Midland. The current Midland station was then opened on 22 February 2026.

== Services ==
=== Train services ===
Midland station has three platforms, platform one is a dual gauge platform served by Transwa's AvonLink, MerredinLink and Prospector services, and platforms two and three are used by terminating Transperth Midland line services. The new station design will allow for terminating trains to continue east towards the Bellevue railway depot once it opens.

The station saw 1,125,120 Transperth passengers in the 2013-14 financial year.

Midland platform arrangement
Stop ID	Platform	Line	Stopping Pattern	Destination	Via	Notes
95026	1	Prospector	All, Limited express	East Perth		
95026	1	Prospector	All, Limited express	Kalgoorlie		
95026	1	MerredinLink	All, Limited express	East Perth		
95026	1	MerredinLink	All, Limited express	Merredin		
95026	1	AvonLink	All	East Perth		
95026	1	AvonLink	All	Northam		
99531	2	Midland line	All stations	Perth	Bayswater	
99532	3	Midland line	All stations	Perth	Bayswater	

=== Bus services ===
Midland Station is served by Transperth bus services as well as Transwa road coaches which utilise stand 7.

==== Bus stands ====
Midland bus stand arrangement
Stop ID	Stand	Route	Destination / description	Notes
28962	1		Set-down only	
28962	1	901	Rail Replacement to Perth	
28963	2	313	to Jane Brook via Morrison Road, Talbot Road and Jane Brook Drive	
28963	2	314	Jane Brook Circular (clockwise) via Talbot Road and Morrison Road	
28963	2	315	Stratton Circular (clockwise) via Blackadder Road and Morrison Road	
28964	3	323	to Swan View via Morrison Road, Innamlncka Road and Welbourn Road	
28964	3	324	Jane Brook Circular (anti-clockwise) via Morrison Road and Talbot Road	
28964	3	325	Stratton Circular (anti-clockwise) via Morrison Road and Blackadder Road	
28964	3	326	Midvale Circular (anti-clockwise) via Victoria Parade	
28964	3	327	to Swan View via Morrison Road and Blanchard Road	
28965	4	320	to Mundaring via Great Eastern Highway, Old York Road and Strettle Road	
28965	4	328	to Chidlow via Great Eastern Highway, Old York Road, Parkerville, Stoneville and Keane Street East	Selected trips extend to Wooroloo or further to Wundowie
28966	5	307	to Kalamunda bus station via Military Road and Helena Valley	
28966	5	321	to Glen Forrest via Great Eastern Highway, Old York Road, Hillsden Road and Ryecroft Road	Selected trips extend to Mundaring
28966	5	322	to Glen Forrest via Koongamia, Coulston Road and Ryecroft Road	Selected trips deviate via Hillsden Road or extend to Mundaring
28972	6	277	to High Wycombe Station via Midland Road and Newburn Road	
28972	6	278	to High Wycombe Station via Abernethy Road and Wittenoom Road	
28973	7	811	Geraldton via Northam and Mullewa	Transwa serices
28973	7	879, GPE1	Kalbarri or Geraldton via Eneabba	Transwa serices
28973	7	891, 851	Geraldton via Moora	Transwa serices
28973	7	EP3, EP5	Esperance via Kulin or via Hyden	Transwa serices
28974	8	290	to Redcliffe Station via Great Eastern Highway	
28974	8	291	to Redcliffe Station via Serpentine Drive and Barker Road	
28975	9	308	Viveash circular via La Salle College	
28975	9	310	to Upper Swan via Hamersley Street and Great Northern Highway	
28975	9	312	to Ellenbrook Town Centre via Great Northern Highway, West Swan Road and Henley Brook Bus Station	
28975	10	358	to Whiteman Park via Suffolk St / West Swan Rd	
28975	10	359	to Whiteman Park via West Swan Rd / Reid Hwy	
28975	11	300	Midland Gate Circular (anti-clockwise)	
28975	11		School specials	
28975	12	301	to Midland Health Campus	
