= Transwa WDA/WDB/WDC class =

Railcars made in Australia

Transwa WDA/WDB/WDC and WEA/WEB classes
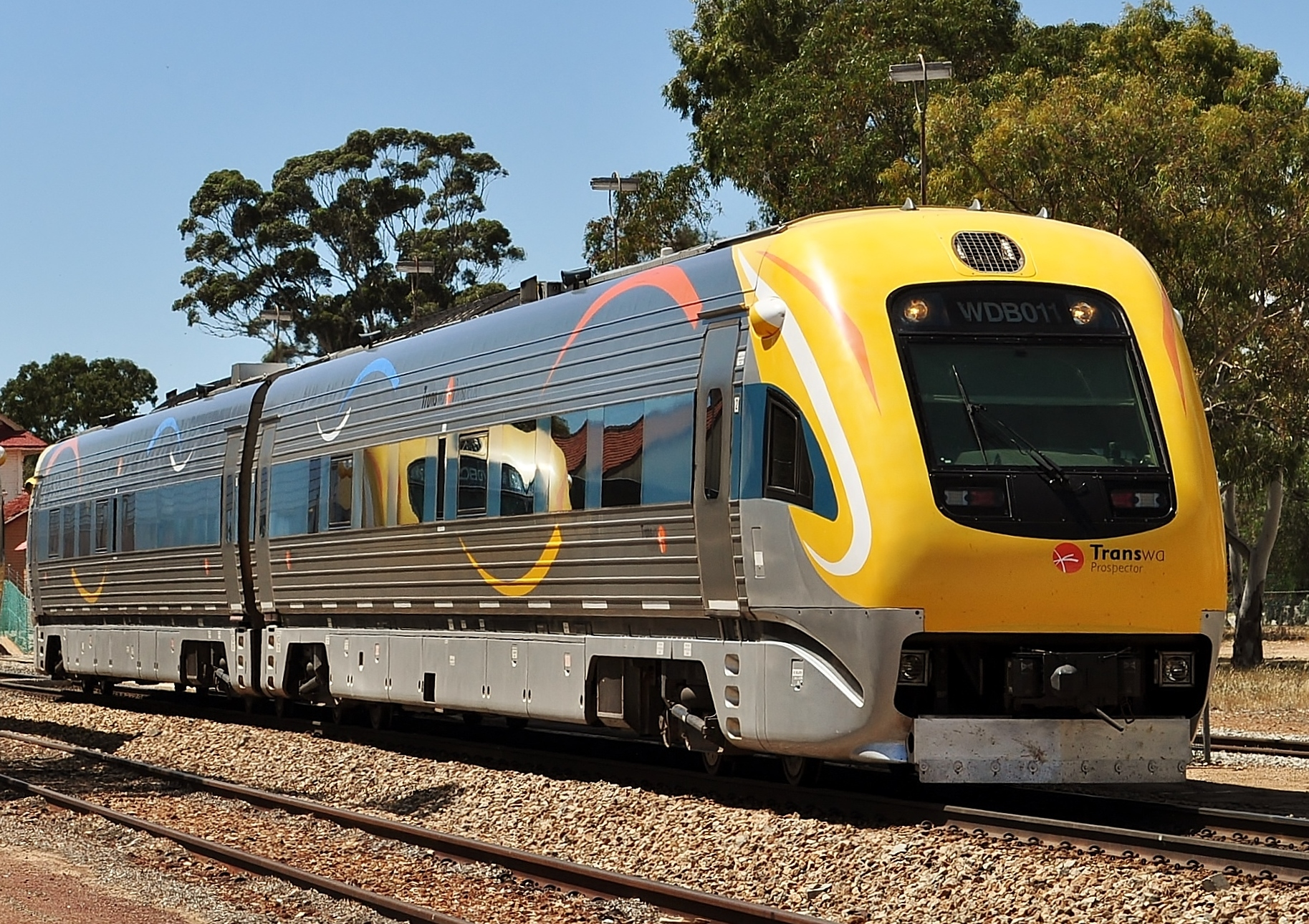
- The Prospector near Merredin in October 2012
- Stock type: Diesel-hydraulic multiple unit
- Manufacturer: United Goninan
- Built at: Broadmeadow, NSW
- Replaced: WAGR WCA/WCE class
- Constructed: 2003
- Entered service: WDA/WDB: 28 June 2004; WDC: 31 December 2004; WEA/WEB: 1 August 2005
- Number built: 9
- Number in service: 9
- Formation: WDA–WDB; WDA–WDC–WDB; WEA–WEB
- Fleet numbers: WDA001–003; WDB011–013; WDC021; WEA031, WEB041
- Capacity: 100 (WDA/WDB 2-car); 160 (WDA/WDC/WDB 3-car); 143 or 138 w/2 Wheelchairs (WEA/WEB 2-car)
- Operator: Transwa
- Depots: Prospector Maintenance Depot, Kewdale
- Lines served: Eastern; Eastern Goldfields

Specifications
- Car body construction: Stainless steel
- Train length: 2-car: 54.8 m (179 ft 9 in); 3-car: 80.07 m (262 ft 8 in)
- Car length: WDA/WDB, WEA/WEB: 27.4 m (89 ft 11 in); WDC: 25.27 m (82 ft 11 in)
- Width: 3,152 mm (10 ft 4.1 in)
- Height: 4,462 mm (14 ft 7.7 in)
- Floor height: 1.32 m (4 ft 4 in)
- Doors: 4 × IFE Tebel
- Wheel diameter: 850–770 mm (33–30 in) (new–worn)
- Wheelbase: 2.6 m (8 ft 6 in)
- Maximum speed: 200 km/h (120 mph) (design); 160 km/h (99 mph) (track speed)
- Weight: WDA: 67.96 t (66.89 long tons; 74.91 short tons); WDB: 66.453 t (65.403 long tons; 73.252 short tons); WDC: 62.27 t (61.29 long tons; 68.64 short tons); WEA: 65.55 t (64.51 long tons; 72.26 short tons); WEB: 65.175 t (64.146 long tons; 71.843 short tons)
- Prime mover: 2 × Cummins N14E-R 518 Horizontal in-line 6 (modified)
- Power output: 386 kW (518 hp) @ 2100rpm per engine
- Transmission: 2 × Voith T212 bre turbo transmission
- Power supply: Transtechnik 415V shop power
- HVAC: Noske-Kaeser model RHKA 28-2D/1
- Bogies: Siemens SF 5000 DMU
- Braking system: Knorr-Bremse (air actuated disc brakes) Hydrodynamic (transmission)
- Safety system: ATP
- Coupling system: Schaku model 40-1218(1)/40-1319(2)
- Multiple working: Within class
- Track gauge: 1,435 mm (4 ft 8 1/2 in) standard gauge

Notes/references
- Sourced from unless otherwise noted.

The Transwa WDA/WDB/WDC and WEA/WEB classes are two classes of railcars built by United Goninan, Broadmeadow for Transwa in 2004–2005 to replace the WAGR WCA/WCE class railcars on the AvonLink, MerredinLink and Prospector services in Western Australia. The trains are capable of 200 km/h operation and run at 160 km/h in service.

== History ==
In December 2000, Westrail awarded a contract to United Goninan, Broadmeadow for nine railcars to replace the 1971 built WAGR WCA/WCE class railcars. Seven were for the Prospector service and two were for the AvonLink and MerredinLink services. One of the WDC railcars suffered an electrical fault in one of the air conditioning system which caused the railcar to catch fire. The railcar was overhauled and put back into service, some warping of the metal panel work still visible on the railcar to this day.

These consist of three WDA driving cars, three WDB driving cars without buffet, and one motored WDC non-driving car. These form two two-car sets and one three-car set. The AvonLink set consists of one WEA and WEB railcar and has a different design of seat, and does not have the entertainment system or buffet that The Prospector has.
