= Kellerberrin, Western Australia =

Kellerberrin
- Town
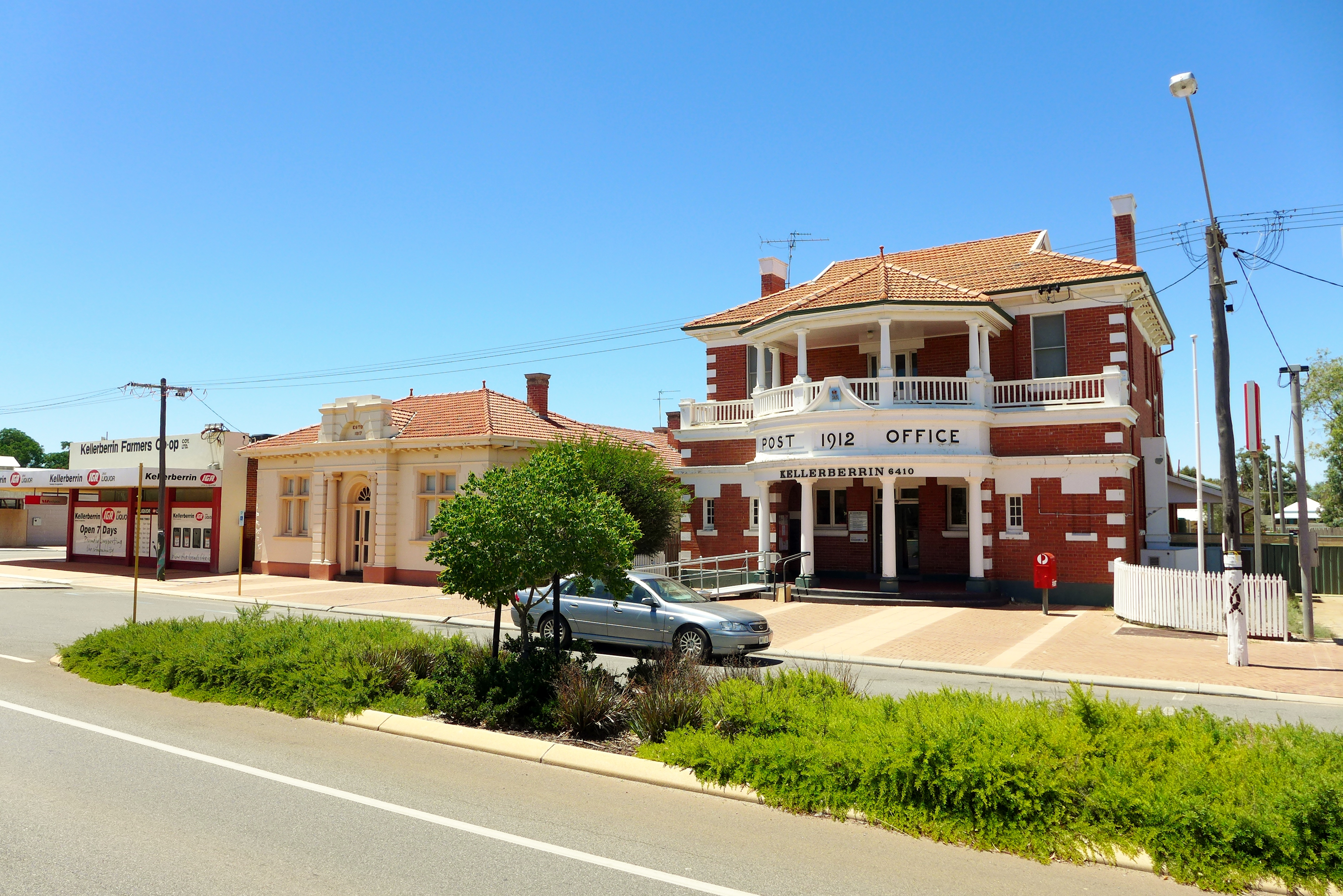
- Massingham Street, Kellerberrin, 2014

- Interactive map of Kellerberrin
- Coordinates: 31.63°S 117.71°E
- Country: Australia
- State: Western Australia
- LGA: Shire of Kellerberrin
- Location: 205 km (127 mi) east of Perth; 55 km (34 mi) west of Merredin; 81 km (50 mi) south east of Dowerin
- Established: 1901

Government
  - State electorate: Central Wheatbelt
  - Federal division: Durack

Area
  - Total: 305 km^{2} (118 sq mi)
- Elevation: 254 m (833 ft)

Population
  - Total: 798 (UCL 2021)
- Postcode: 6410

Kellerberrin is a town in the Wheatbelt region of Western Australia, 205 kilometres (127 mi) east of Perth on the Great Eastern Highway. The town serves as a stop on the Prospector and MerredinLink rural train services. It is also located on the Golden Pipeline Heritage Trail.

== History ==
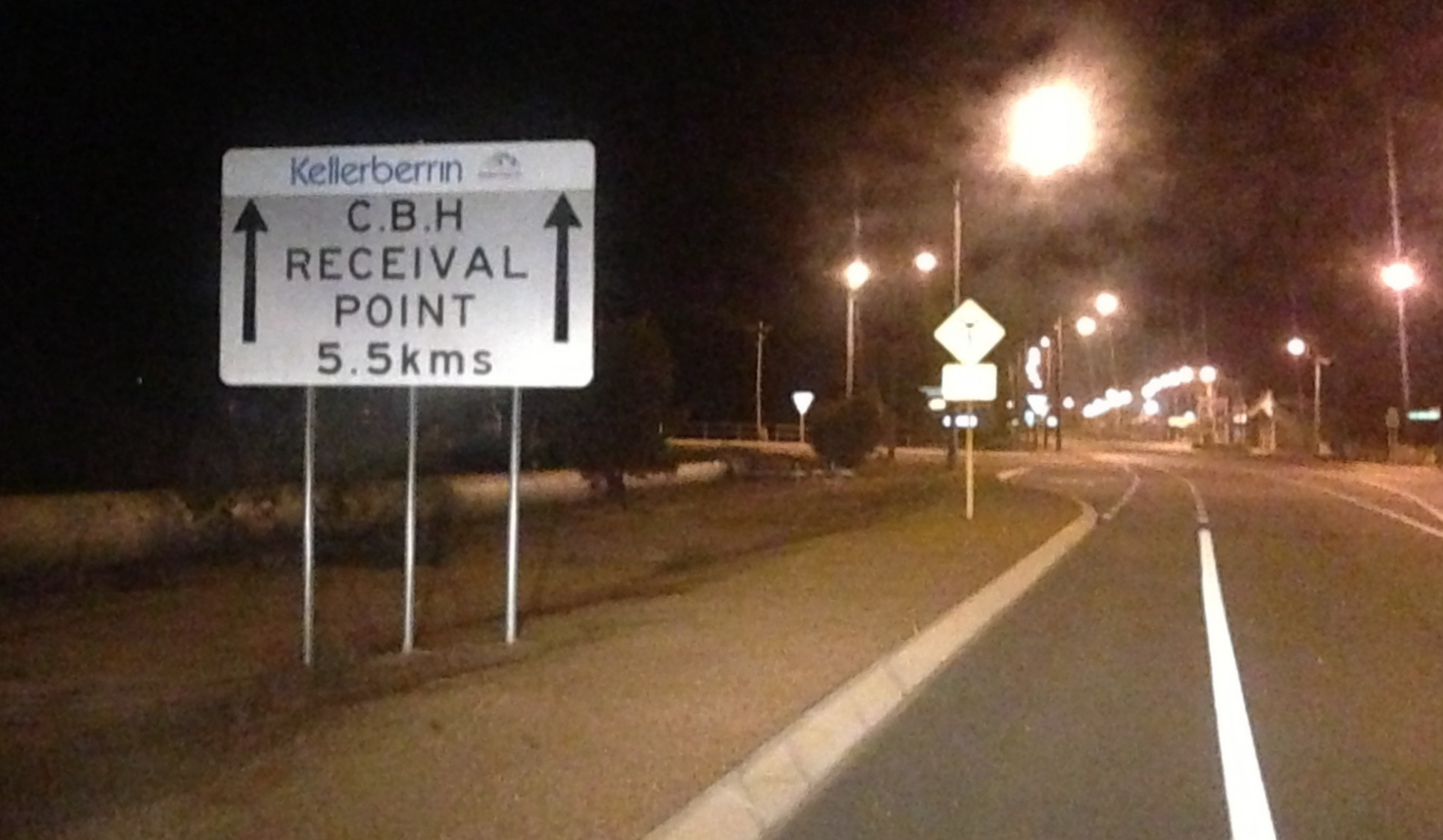

Early settlers from 1890 to 1910 from Ireland settled in the area of Kellerberrin and Wittem. Their family name was English. A road was named after this family. The railway line from Northam to Southern Cross was constructed through here in 1893–94, and this section opened for traffic in 1895. Kellerberrin was one of the original stations when the line opened. By 1898 there was a demand for small blocks of land in the area, and the government surveyed a number of 8.1-hectare (20-acre) lots the same year. The area was gazetted as Kellerberrin townsite in 1901, and the government soon made more land available for settlers.

In 1898 the Agricultural Hall was officially opened. It was built with granite walling and brick dressing with a jarrah and iron roof. The building is located on the north side of the railway line, adjoining the post office. The hall is now used as a folk museum.

In 1932 the Wheat Pool of Western Australia announced that the town would have two grain elevators, each fitted with an engine, installed at the railway siding.

The surrounding areas produce wheat and other cereal crops. The town is a receival site for Cooperative Bulk Handling.

In September 2023, a worker at a grain silo shot and killed another worker, then shot himself following a standoff with police.

== Etymology ==
The name Kellerberrin is Aboriginal, and is derived from the name of a nearby hill. The hill was first recorded as "Killaburing Hill" by an explorer in 1861, but in 1864 the explorer Charles Hunt recorded it as Kellerberrin Hill. One source claims that Kellerberrin is the name for the fierce ants that are found in the area, while another gives it as meaning "camping place near where rainbow birds are found" – kalla means camping place or place of, and berrin berrin is the rainbow bird.

== Climate ==
Kellerberrin has a semi-arid climate with hot dry summers and slightly wet winters.

Climate data for Kellerberrin
Month	Jan	Feb	Mar	Apr	May	Jun	Jul	Aug	Sep	Oct	Nov	Dec	Year
Record high °C (°F)	47.5 (117.5)	47.5 (117.5)	44.4 (111.9)	39.5 (103.1)	34.3 (93.7)	27.5 (81.5)	24.9 (76.8)	31.0 (87.8)	34.5 (94.1)	39.4 (102.9)	44.5 (112.1)	46.3 (115.3)	47.5 (117.5)
Mean daily maximum °C (°F)	34.0 (93.2)	33.3 (91.9)	30.2 (86.4)	25.7 (78.3)	20.8 (69.4)	17.5 (63.5)	16.4 (61.5)	17.6 (63.7)	20.7 (69.3)	24.7 (76.5)	28.9 (84.0)	32.0 (89.6)	25.1 (77.2)
Mean daily minimum °C (°F)	16.9 (62.4)	16.9 (62.4)	15.1 (59.2)	11.7 (53.1)	8.3 (46.9)	6.8 (44.2)	5.6 (42.1)	5.4 (41.7)	6.4 (43.5)	8.8 (47.8)	12.3 (54.1)	15.0 (59.0)	10.8 (51.4)
Record low °C (°F)	7.2 (45.0)	6.1 (43.0)	2.1 (35.8)	1.0 (33.8)	−2.2 (28.0)	−5.2 (22.6)	−4.5 (23.9)	−2.5 (27.5)	−4.5 (23.9)	−1.5 (29.3)	0.5 (32.9)	4.1 (39.4)	−5.2 (22.6)
Average precipitation mm (inches)	13.4 (0.53)	14.4 (0.57)	20.4 (0.80)	21.1 (0.83)	42.0 (1.65)	53.6 (2.11)	51.6 (2.03)	41.0 (1.61)	26.4 (1.04)	18.2 (0.72)	12.4 (0.49)	13.4 (0.53)	327.5 (12.89)
Average precipitation days	2.0	2.3	3.2	4.6	8.3	11.5	12.7	11.0	8.2	5.5	3.3	2.4	75.0
Average relative humidity (%)	27	30	34	42	50	60	62	57	48	35	30	26	42

== Rail services ==
Transwa's MerredinLink and Prospector services stop at Kellerberrin, at least one service each day.

Preceding station	Transwa	Following station
Tammin towards East Perth	MerredinLink	Doodlakine towards Merredin
Tammin towards East Perth	Prospector	Doodlakine towards Kalgoorlie

== Notable people ==
Kellerberrin is the birthplace of:

- Barbara York Main (1929–2019) – Australian arachnologist, author, and adjunct professor at the University of Western Australia.
- Jessie Pengilly (1918–1945) – world record holding road and track cyclist
- Derek Kickett – Australian rules footballer former player for North Melbourne, Essendon and Sydney. Won 1987 Sandover Medal.
- Byron Pickett – Australian rules footballer acknowledged as one of the finest Aboriginal players in the history of the game, played for Port Adelaide (SAFL), North Melbourne, Port Adelaide (AFL) and Melbourne. Won 2004 Norm Smith Medal.
- Peter Walsh (1935–2015) – Australian Senator, served as Minister for Resources and Energy and Finance Minister
- Nicky Winmar – Australian rules footballer, played for South Fremantle, St Kilda and Western Bulldogs.

== See also ==
- The Avon Gazette and York Times
