= Prospector (Western Australian train) =

Passenger train between East Perth and Kalgoorlie, Western Australia

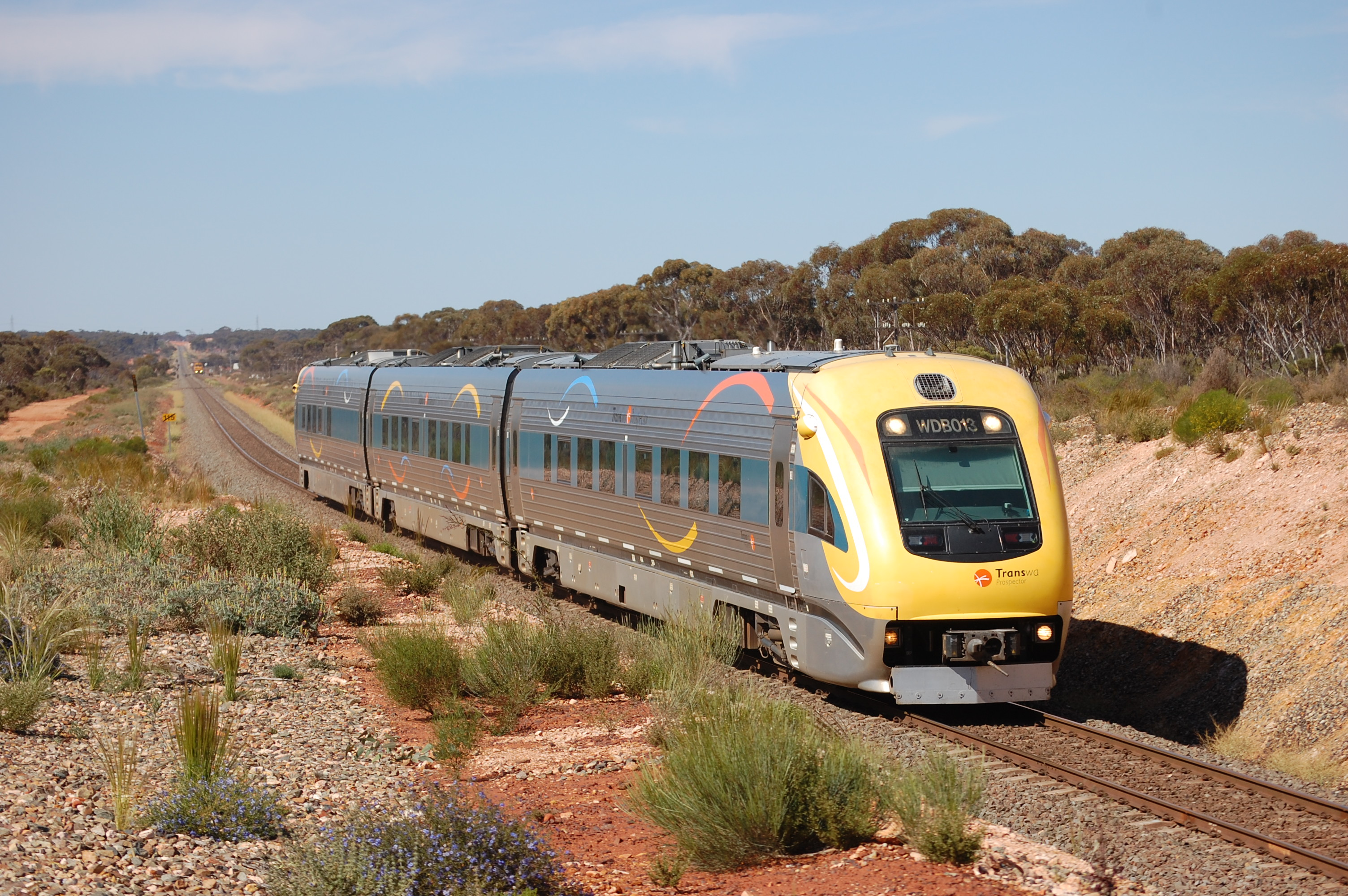
- A train of Transwa WDA/WDB/WDC class railcars operating on this service near Kalgoorlie in February 2010

Overview
- Service type: Passenger train
- Status: Operational
- Locale: Western Australia
- Predecessor: The Kalgoorlie
- First service: 29 November 1971
- Current operator: Transwa
- Former operators: WAGR (1971–1975); Westrail (1975–2000); WAGR Commission (2000–2003)
- Ridership: 90,818 (year to June 2026)

Route
- Termini: East Perth; Kalgoorlie
- Distance travelled: 653 km (406 mi)
- Average journey time: 6 hours 45 minutes
- Service frequency: 9 trips in each direction per week
- Lines used: Eastern; Eastern Goldfields

Technical
- Rolling stock: WDA/WDB/WDC railcars
- Track gauge: 1,435 mm (4 ft 8 1/2 in) standard gauge

The Prospector is a rural passenger train service in Western Australia operated by Transwa between East Perth and Kalgoorlie. On this service, two trains depart almost at the same time in opposite directions: one travels between East Perth and Kalgoorlie, the other between Kalgoorlie and East Perth with a crew changeover occurring in Merredin.

== History ==
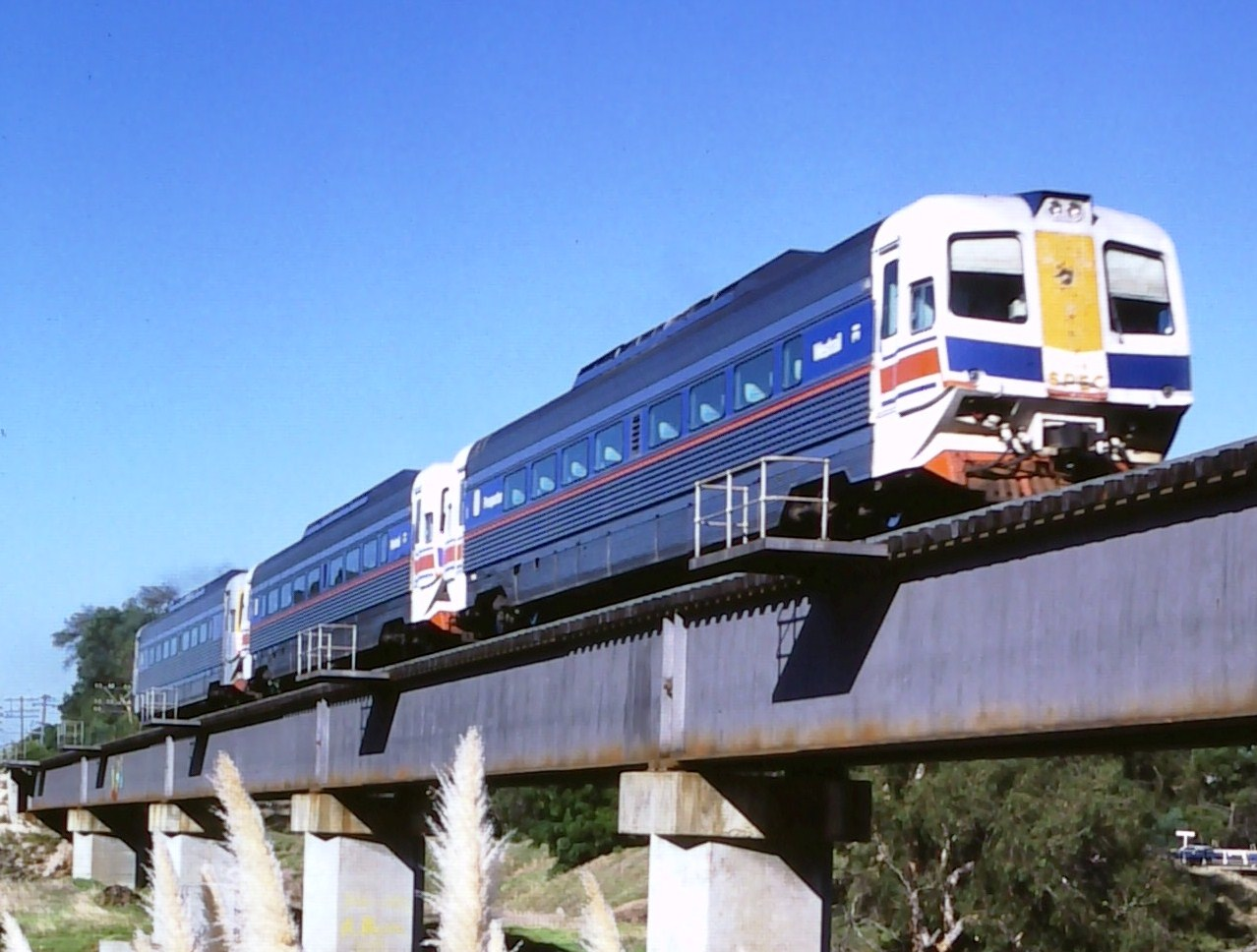
WAGR WCA/WCE class railcars crossing the Swan River at the Guildford Railway Bridge in April 1986

With the standard gauge line from Perth to Kalgoorlie due to open in mid-1969, the Western Australian Government Railways decided to replace The Kalgoorlie overnight sleeper service with a daylight service. The new service commenced on 29 November 1971, cutting the 653-kilometre (406 mi) journey time from fourteen to eight hours. With an average speed of 85 km/h (53 mph), it was the fastest service in Australia at the time.

In 2004, the original railcars in use since 1971 were replaced with trains capable of reducing the journey time to 6 hours 45 minutes.

== Stops ==
- East Perth
- Midland
- Toodyay
- Northam
- Meckering
- Cunderdin
- Tammin
- Kellerberrin
- Doodlakine
- Hines Hill
- Merredin
- Burracoppin
- Carrabin
- Bodallin
- Moorine Rock
- Southern Cross
- Koolyanobbing
- Bonnie Vale
- Kalgoorlie

== Services ==
There is one train each way daily between East Perth and Kalgoorlie. On Mondays and Fridays, there are two services each way.

== Onboard facilities ==
Each seat on board is in the same class. At every seat there is a touchscreen entertainment system with a small selection of movies, TV shows and music. They also offer a tray table, in-seat AC power (Australian type only), and a foot rest.

Food is not complimentary on board and can be bought at the buffet. The buffet offers a variety of items such as ham and cheese croissants, pies, muffins, soft drinks, potato chips, lollies and alcohol.

In 2022, Wi-Fi internet access was introduced to the service.

== Rolling stock ==
In 1968, Comeng, Granville were awarded a contract to build eight WAGR WCA/WCE class railcars.

Built to take advantage of the generous loading gauge on the new line, they were the largest carriages ever built in Australia. They were also the first trains in Australia to have at-seat catering. These held the record for the highest speed attained by an Australian train until bettered by a New South Wales XPT in September 1981.

In December 2000, Westrail awarded a contract to United Goninan, Broadmeadow for seven Transwa WDA/WDB/WDC class railcars to replace the original railcars.

The first entered service on 28 June 2004. The new railcars are capable of 200 km/h (124 mph), but track conditions restrict their top speed to 160 km/h (99 mph). Nonetheless, they further reduced journey times to 6 hours 45 minutes.

== Patronage ==
The Prospector had 90,818 passengers in the year leading up to June 2026.

Prospector patronage
| Financial year | Patronage |
|---|---|
| 2002–03 | 87,541 |
| 2003–04 | 87,407 |
| 2004–05 | 88,291 |
| 2005–06 | 86,133 |
| 2006–07 | 92,479 |
| 2007–08 | 91,352 |
| 2008–09 | 92,337 |
| 2009–10 | 87,188 |
| 2010–11 | 90,418 |
| 2011–12 | 99,627 |
| 2012–13 | 95,303 |
| 2013–14 | 88,725 |
| 2014–15 | 89,107 |
| 2015–16 | 88,628 |
| 2016–17 | 87,257 |
| 2017–18 | 86,151 |
| 2018–19 | 85,952 |
| 2019–20 | 69,843 |
| 2020–21 | 75,781 |
| 2021–22 | 68,497 |
| 2022–23 | 77,926 |
| 2023–24 | 81,713 |
| 2024–25 | 82,601 |
| 2025–26 | 90,818 |

== See also ==
- AvonLink
- Australind (train service)
- MerredinLink

== Sources ==
- Higham, Geoffrey (2007). Marble Bar to Mandurah: A History of Passenger Rail Services in Western Australia (1st ed.). Bassendean: Rail Heritage WA. ISBN 978-0-9803922-0-3. OCLC 271545712. Wikidata Q140375689.

== Bibliography ==
- 100th anniversary of rail link (History of the Eastern Goldfields railway, officially completed on 1 January 1897, to the present, including introduction of the Prospector train on 29 November 1971) Kalgoorlie Miner 1 January 1997, p. 2
- Best, Catherine (11 June 2025). "Can't afford the Indian Pacific? Try this bargain outback train instead". The Sydney Morning Herald.
