= AvonLink =

Passenger train between East Perth and Northam, Western Australia

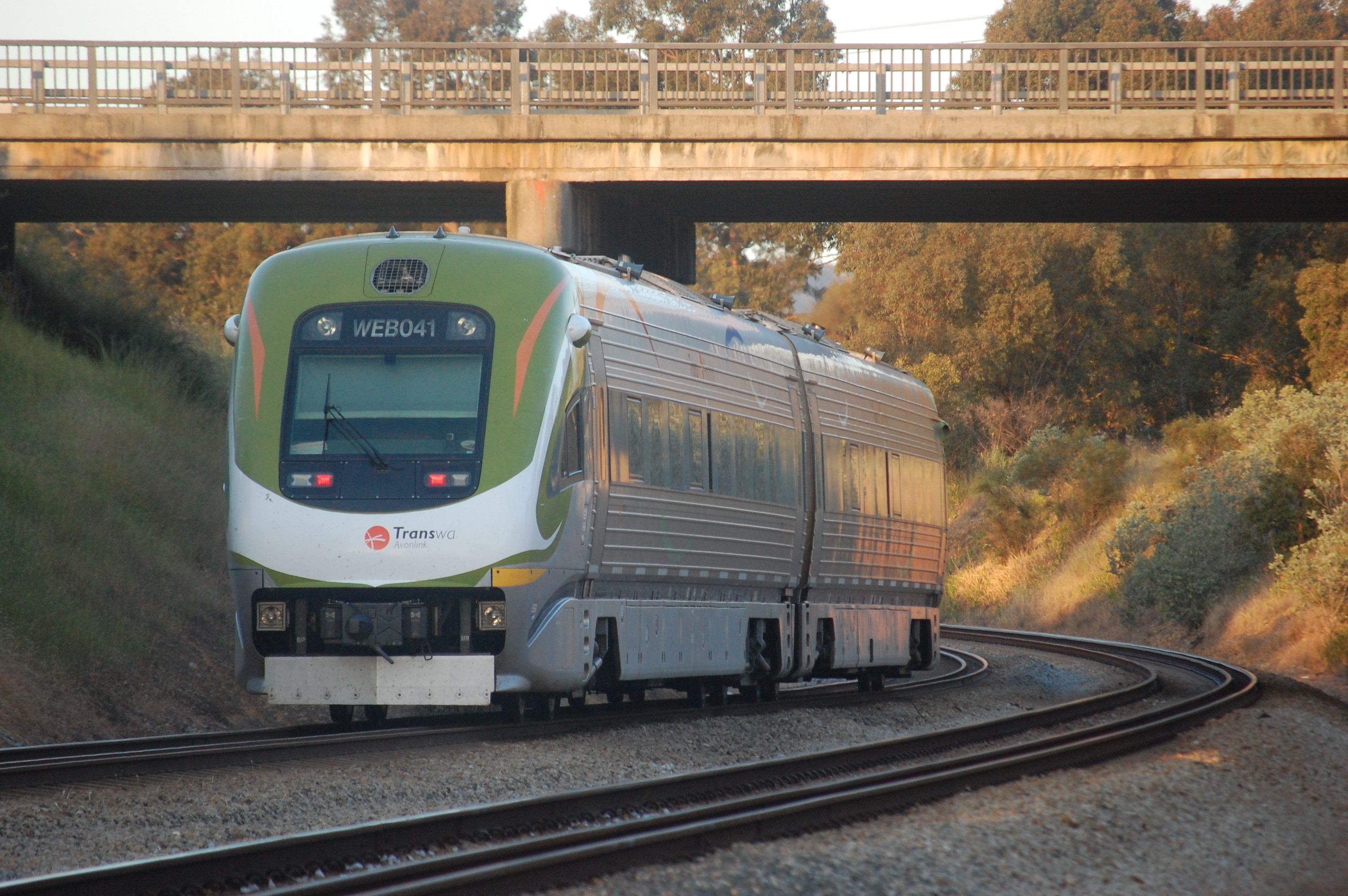
- AvonLink railcars going under the Great Eastern Highway bridge in Swan View in October 2009

Overview
- Service type: Passenger train
- Status: Operational
- Locale: Western Australia
- First service: 24 September 1995
- Current operator: Transwa
- Former operators: Westrail (1995–2000); WAGR Commission (2000–2003)
- Ridership: 12,044 (year to June 2026)

Route
- Termini: East Perth; Northam
- Distance travelled: 111.32 kilometres
- Average journey time: 1 hour 40 minutes
- Service frequency: Daily (weekdays only)
- Line used: Eastern

Technical
- Rolling stock: WEA/WEB railcar
- Track gauge: 1,435 mm (4 ft 8 1/2 in) standard gauge
Route map
Key

The AvonLink is a rural passenger train service in Western Australia operated by Transwa between East Perth and Northam.

== History ==
The consideration of revitalising passenger services in 1993 saw the Avonlink Ministerial Committee formed by Minister for Transport Eric Charlton.

The first AvonLink service departed Northam for East Perth on 24 September 1995, and was significant, as it was the first new country passenger rail service in Western Australia for 47 years. From July 2001, the Perth terminus moved from East Perth to Midland where a connection is made with Transperth Midland line services.

In June 2004, the AvonLink was extended to Merredin on three days a week, operating as the MerredinLink. In September 2006, Transwa trialed a day trip Sunday service to Northam. The six-week trial proved popular with each service being fully booked out weeks in advance. However, due to overall lack of passengers at other times the service was discontinued.

In August 2013, Transwa announced the AvonLink would cease on 30 December 2013 due to poor patronage and be replaced by a road coach. However, this announcement generated significant criticism. On 19 November 2013, two Wheatbelt region MLAs, Mia Davies and Shane Love, presented petitions to the WA State Parliament calling for the retention of the AvonLink. The petitions bore a total of more than 3,000 signatures of Avon Valley residents.

On 3 December 2013, Minister for Transport Troy Buswell announced the AvonLink service would be retained, initially for a period of six months, while Transwa and the Wheatbelt Development Commission worked through the funding solution required to keep the service running beyond that initial period.

In May 2014, it was announced that an enhanced service would continue until at least June 2017.

In December 2014, an enhanced service was introduced with services increased from one to three trains on certain days. From July 2017, the AvonLink was reduced back to one service in each direction on weekdays only.

Following the opening of the new Midland station on 22 February 2026, it was announced that from 23 February 2026 AvonLink services would begin terminating at East Perth again instead of Midland.

== Services ==
As of February 2026, one AvonLink service operates on weekdays in each direction between East Perth and Northam stopping at Midland and Toodyay.

== Rolling stock ==
The service commenced with WCA/WCE railcars built in 1971 to operate the Prospector.

In December 2000 Westrail awarded a contract to United Goninan, Broadmeadow for 9 WDA/WDB/WDC railcars to replace the 1971 built stock. 3 WDA/WDB and 1 WDC were for the Prospector and 2 WEA/WEB were for the AvonLink and MerredinLink services. The new train entered service on 1 August 2005.

== Ridership ==
The AvonLink had 12,044 passengers in the year leading up to June 2026.

== See also ==
- Australind (train service)
