= Northam railway station, Western Australia =

Railway station in Northam, Western Australia

Northam
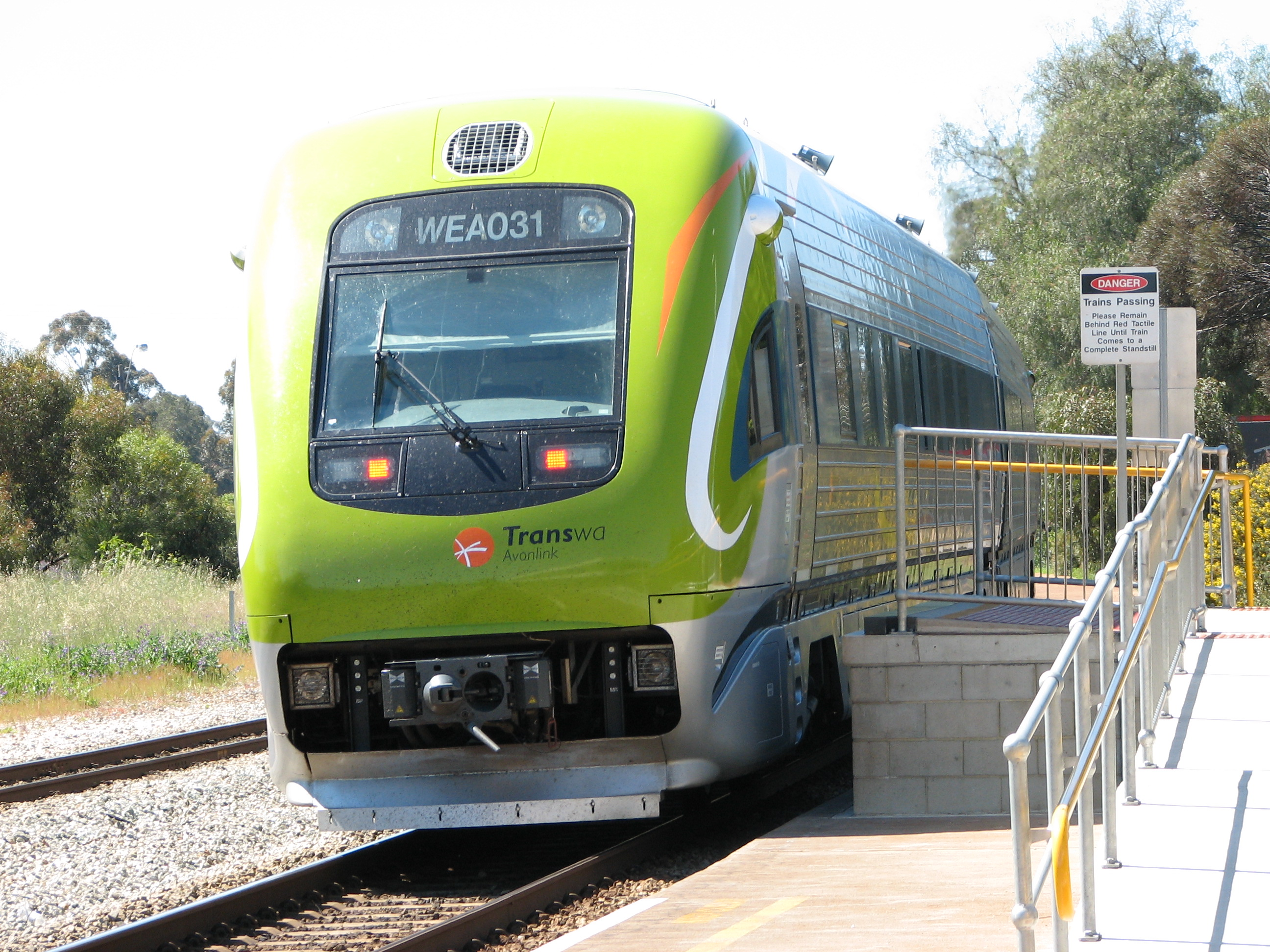
- AvonLink train at Northam station, October 2005

General information
- Location: Wellington Street, Northam
- Coordinates: 31.64938°S 116.67527°E
- Owner: Transwa
- Operator: Transwa
- Line: Eastern
- Distance: 120.50 kilometres from Perth
- Platforms: 1
- Tracks: 2

Construction
- Structure type: Ground
- Accessible: Yes

Other information
- Status: Unstaffed

History
- Opened: 1900 (original)
- Closed: 12 February 1966 (original)
- Rebuilt: 7 October 1966 (current)

Services
Preceding station	Transwa	Following station
Toodyay towards East Perth	AvonLink	Terminus
Toodyay towards East Perth	MerredinLink	Meckering towards Merredin or Kalgoorlie
Toodyay towards East Perth	Prospector	Meckering towards Merredin or Kalgoorlie
Location

Northam railway station is located in Northam on the Eastern Railway route in Western Australia. It is the second and more recent railway station in Northam.

== Original station ==
The line to Northam opened on 13 October 1886 at the end of a 15 kilometre branch line from Spencers Brook on the Eastern Railway. When the Eastern Railway was extended to Southern Cross on 1 July 1894, it was done so via Northam.

Northam became an important junction station with a large yard, signalbox and locomotive depot to serve lines radiating out to Goomalling, Mullewa, Mukinbudin and Wyalkatchem. In 1900, a new station opened on the south-west side of the town.

== New station ==
As part of the construction of a new dual gauge Eastern Railway from Midland via the Avon Valley, a new station was opened on the eastern side of the town on 7 October 1966 by the Minister for Railways Charles Court. Part of the original line along Fitzgerald Street was retained to allow access to the steam locomotive depot and oil and flour mill sidings. It was later removed.

Today, the dual gauge Eastern Railway terminates at Northam and becomes the standard gauge Eastern Goldfields Railway. Narrow gauge lines branch off east of the town north to Goomalling and south to York and Albany via the Great Southern Railway.

Between the western side of the town and Toodyay lies Avon Yard.

== Old station ==
The original station closed on 12 February 1966 and has been converted to a museum.

== Passenger services ==
Transwa's AvonLink, MerredinLink and Prospector services stop at Northam, at least one service each day.

The Indian Pacific also passes here, running once or twice a week (depending on the time of year) between East Perth and Sydney Central, but does not stop at the station.
