= Transwa =

Western Australian regional public transport provider

Overview
- Owner: Public Transport Authority
- Locale: Western Australia
- Transit type: Coach; Regional rail
- Annual ridership: 361,573 (year to June 2026)
- Headquarters: Public Transport Centre
- Website: www.transwa.wa.gov.au

Operation
- Began operation: 28 May 2003

Technical
- Track gauge: 1,067 mm (3 ft 6 in) (Australind); 1,435 mm (4 ft 8 1/2 in) (Prospector, AvonLink, MerredinLink)

Transwa is Western Australia's regional public transport provider, linking 240 destinations, from Kalbarri in the north to Augusta in the south west to Esperance in the south east.

The Transwa system provides transport between Perth and the major regional towns of Bunbury, Kalgoorlie, Northam, Geraldton and Albany.

Transwa is a part of the Public Transport Authority and was launched on 28 May 2003, replacing the former Western Australian Government Railways Commission.

== Services ==
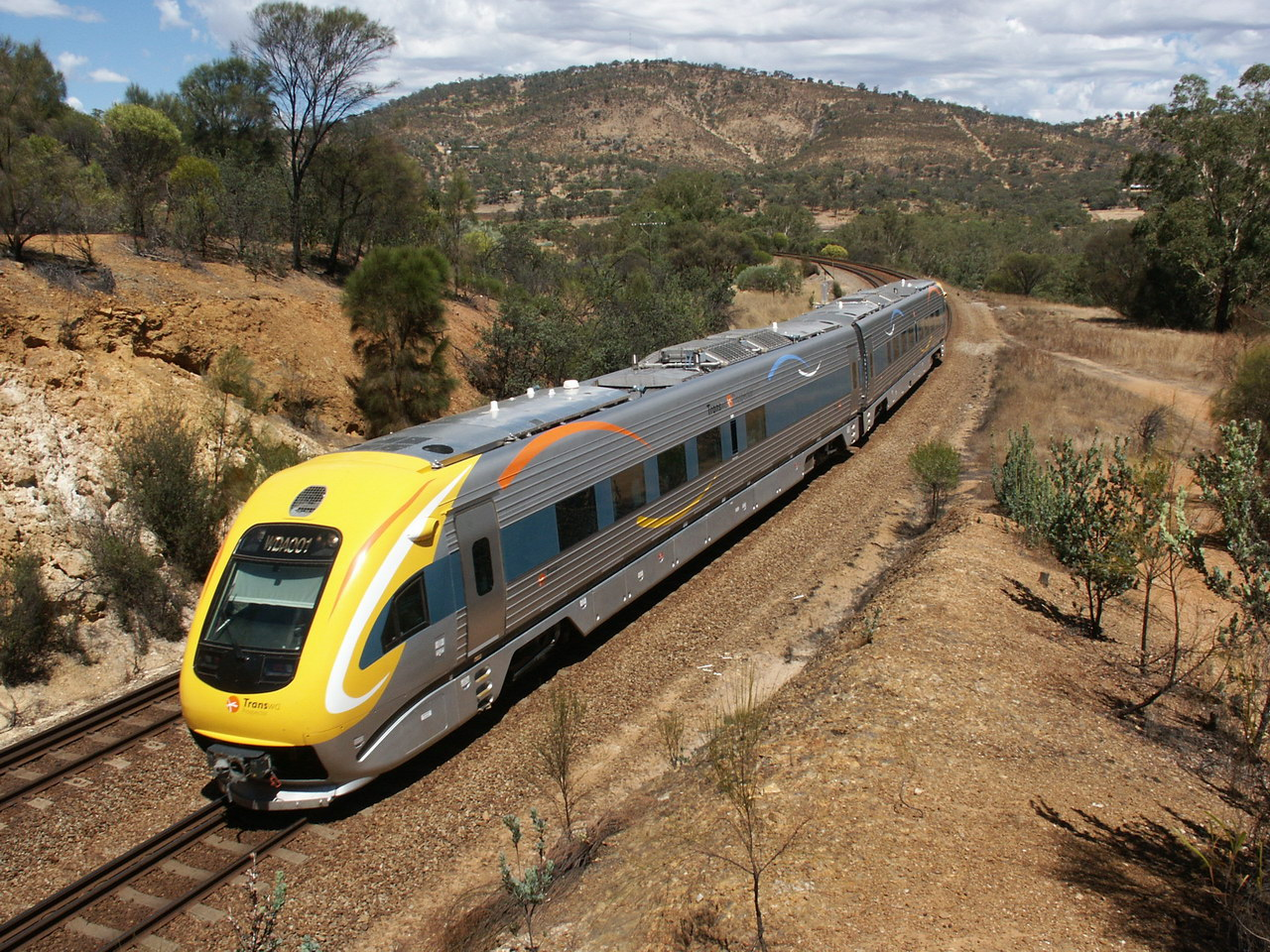
The Prospector near Toodyay in February 2004

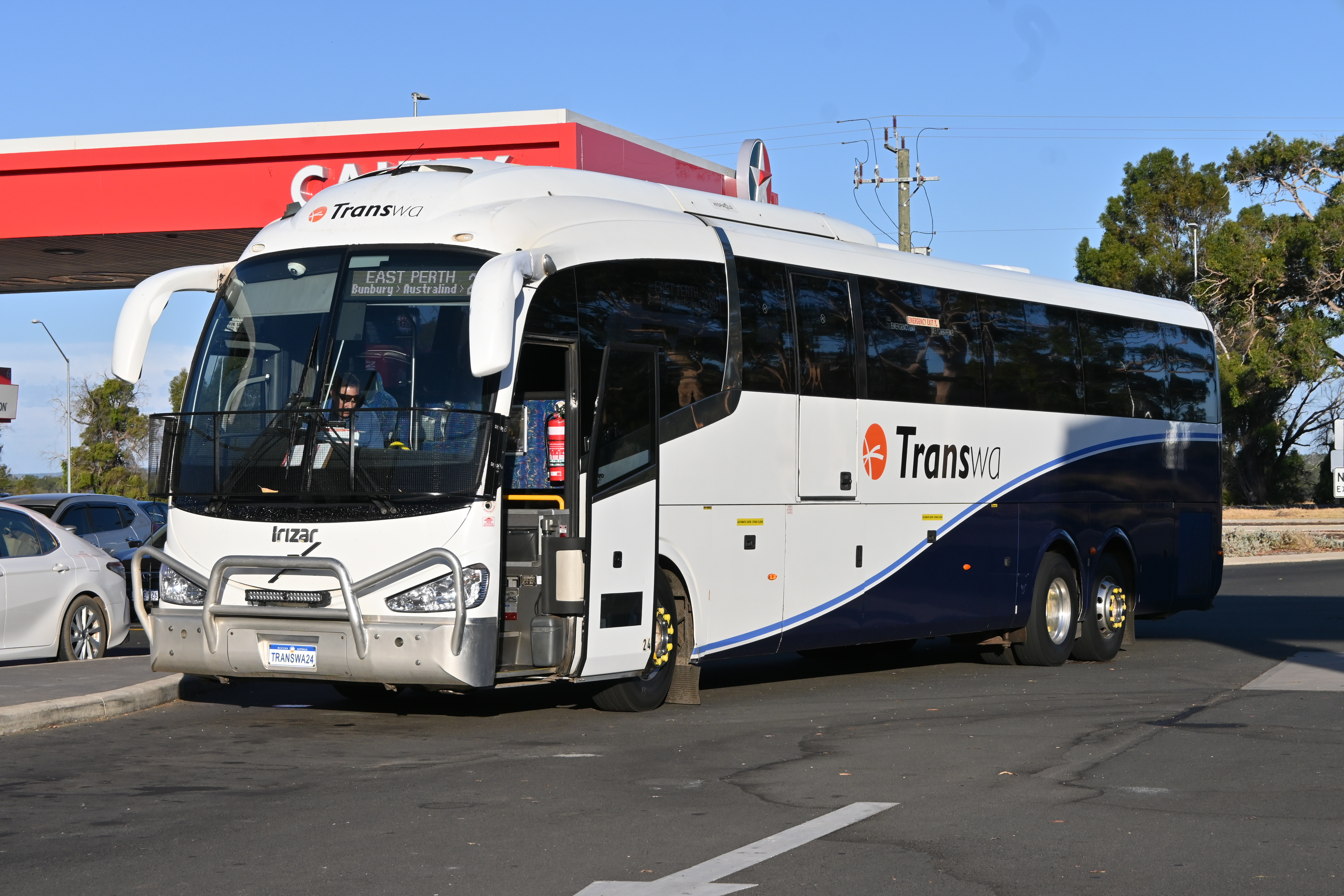
Transwa B11R Coach at Binningup in January 2024

=== Rail services ===
Transwa operate four rail services:

- Australind: Perth to Bunbury
- AvonLink: East Perth to Northam
- MerredinLink: East Perth to Merredin
- Prospector: East Perth to Kalgoorlie

=== Coach services ===
In 2003/04, Transwa introduced 21 Volgren bodied Scania K124EB coaches aimed at revitalising the country coach fleet, which travel to many destinations across southern Western Australia including Albany, Augusta, Pemberton, Esperance, Geraldton, Kalbarri and Meekatharra. In 2015, an order was placed for 23 Irizar i6 3700-bodied Volvo B11R coaches to replace the Scanias.

There are 17 routes:

- GE1: Perth to Esperance via Jerramungup/Dumbleyung
- GE2: Perth to Esperance via Kulin/Hyden
- GE3: Kalgoorlie to Esperance
- GE4: Albany to Hopetoun via Ravensthorpe
- GS1: Perth to Albany via Williams/Kojonup
- GS2: Perth to Albany/Gnowangerup/Katanning via Northam/Narrogin
- GS3: Bunbury to Albany via Walpole
- N1: Perth to Geraldton/Kalbarri via Eneabba
- N2: Perth to Geraldton via Moora/Kalbarri
- N3: Perth to Geraldton via Northam/Mullewa
- N4: Geraldton to Meekatharra
- N5: Perth to Geraldton via Jurien Bay
- SW1: Perth to Augusta/Pemberton via Bunbury
- SW2: Perth to Pemberton via Bunbury and Donnybrook
- SW3: Perth to Pemberton via Bunbury, Collie, Boyup Brook and Bridgetown
- SW4: Bunbury to Boyup Brook via Brunswick and Collie
- SW5: Perth to Collie via Bunbury

== Fleet ==
=== Railcars ===
Class	Image	Manufacturer	Entered service	Number built	Track gauge (mm)	Top speed (km/h)	Service(s)
WDA/WDB/WDC		United Goninan	2005	7	1,435 (standard)	160	Prospector
WEA/WEB		United Goninan	2005	2	1,435 (standard)	160	AvonLink; MerredinLink
ADR/ADS		Alstom	2026	12	1,067 (narrow)	130	Australind

=== Historic railcars ===
All are manufactured by Comeng.

Class	Image	In service	Number built	Track gauge (mm)	Top speed (km/h)	Service(s) operated	Replaced with
WCA/WCE		1971–2005	8	1,435 (standard)	150	AvonLink; Prospector	WDA/WDB/WDC; WEA/WEB
ADP/ADQ		1987–2023	5	1,067 (narrow)	110	Australind	ADR/ADS

=== Coaches ===
- 23 Volvo B11R coaches

== Ridership ==
Service	Ridership						
Service	2025–26	2024–25	2023–24	2022–23	2021–22	2020–21	2019–20
Road coach	199,908	183,783	178,292	168,689	132,944	143,348	149,638
Prospector	90,818	82,601	81,713	77,926	68,497	75,781	69,843
Australind	49,574 (Note: Replaced by road coaches due to suspension of Australind rail service)	47,413	63,041 (Note: Replaced by road coaches from 20 November 2023 due to suspension of Australind rail service)	77,810	60,507	62,149	70,973
AvonLink	12,044	9,400	8,877	7,480	7,057	6,520	7,542
MerredinLink	9,228	8,127	7,696	7,009	6,039	6,351	5,902

== See also ==
- List of Transwa railway stations
