= East Perth railway station =

Railway station in Perth, Western Australia

East Perth
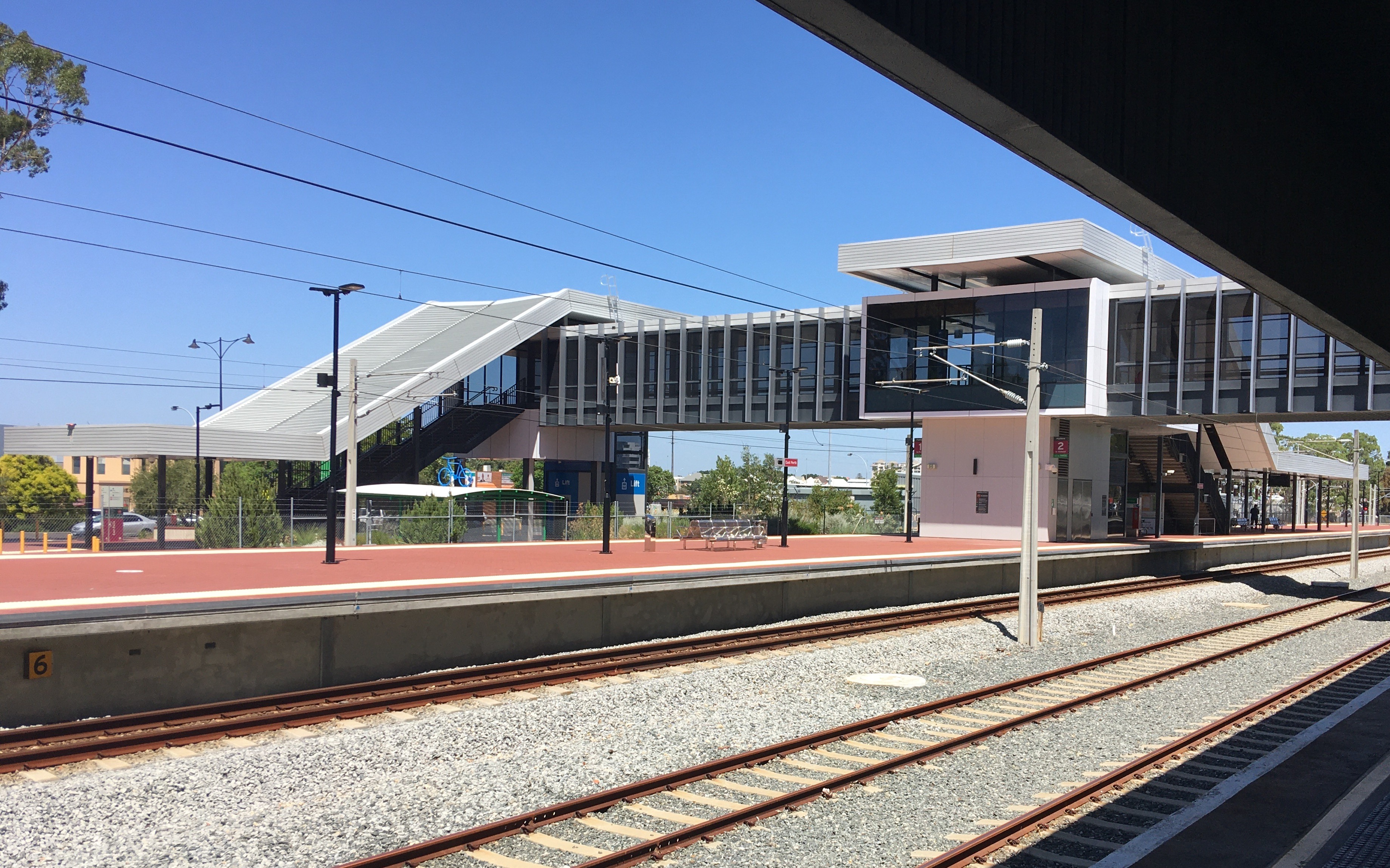
- View of the station platforms and concourse from the Public Transport Centre, February 2021

General information
- Location: East Parade, East Perth; Australia
- Coordinates: 31°56′38″S 115°52′37″E
- Owner: Public Transport Authority
- Operator: Transperth Train Operations
- Lines: Airport line Ellenbrook line Midland line
- Distance: 1.90 kilometres (1.18 mi) from Perth
- Platforms: 2 (1 island), 1 side
- Tracks: 2

Construction
- Structure type: Ground

Other information
- Status: Staffed
- Fare zone: 1

History
- Opened: 1969
- Rebuilt: 2016–2018

Passengers
- 2013-14: 200,284

Services
Preceding station	Transperth	Following station
Claisebrook towards Perth	Midland line	Mount Lawley towards Midland
Claisebrook towards Perth or Claremont	Airport line	Mount Lawley towards High Wycombe
Claisebrook towards Perth	Ellenbrook line	Mount Lawley towards Ellenbrook
Preceding station	Transwa	Following station
Terminus	Prospector	Midland towards Kalgoorlie
Terminus	MerredinLink	Midland towards Merredin
Terminus	AvonLink	Midland towards Northam
Preceding station	Journey Beyond	Following station
Terminus	Indian Pacific	Rawlinna One-way operation
Terminus	Indian Pacific	Kalgoorlie towards Sydney
Location
- Location of East Perth station

East Perth railway station is located on the Midland, Airport, and Ellenbrook lines in Perth, Western Australia. It is operated by Transperth serving the suburb of East Perth. It is adjacent to the East Perth Terminal and Public Transport Centre.

== History ==
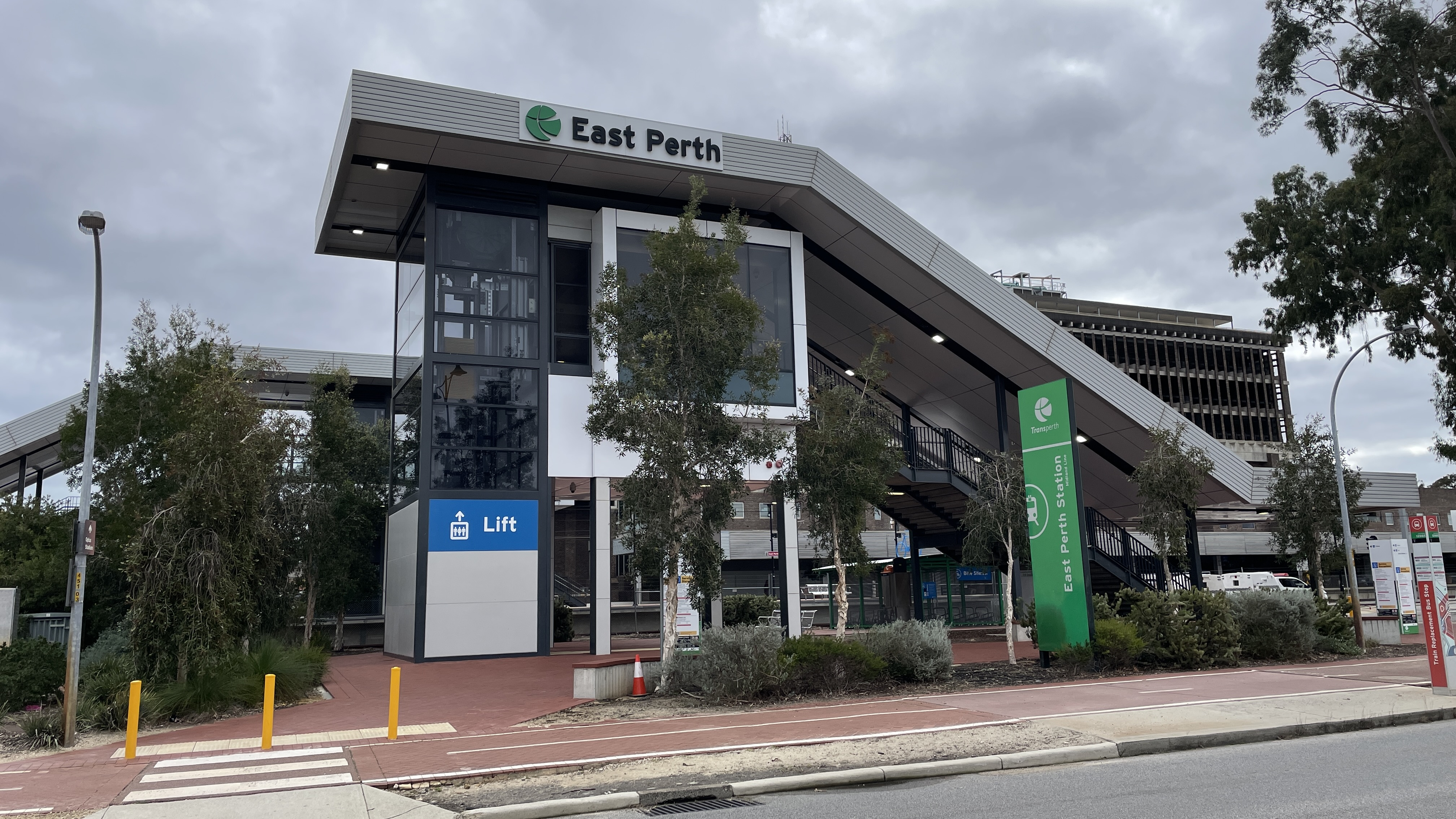
Entrance

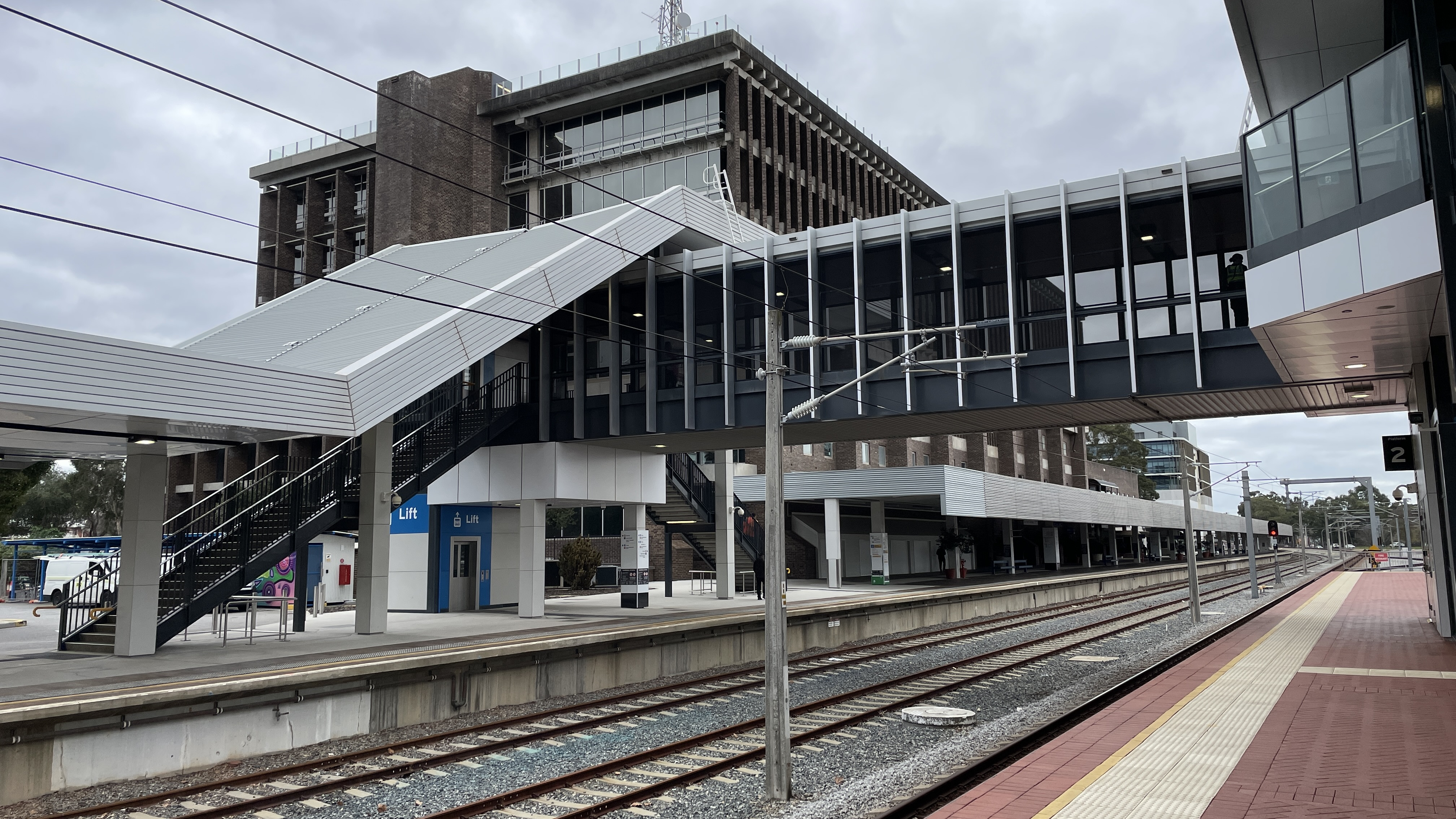
East Perth Terminal seen from Platform 2

The site occupied by East Perth station, East Perth Terminal and the Public Transport Centre was formerly the East Perth Locomotive Depot.

The station took the name of the previous East Perth station, which was renamed Claisebrook. The former East Perth railway station was removed on the change of the railway system in the late 1960s.

The original East Perth railway station opened in 1883, and in the early 20th century was found the name East Perth Junction (the junction being the line that proceeded to Armadale and joined the Eastern Railway close to the station). It was renamed Claisebrook in 1969.

As part of the Perth Stadium transport works, the station was upgraded over a two-year period from 2016 to 2018. Due to the large numbers expected to utilise the station on event days, an upgrade was required to ensure that the station could handle the large crowds, as well as to make it fully accessible. Works included lengthening platforms and associated shelters to handle four to six car trains, upgrading and expanding lifts, staircases and walkways, and expanding car and bike parking spaces. In addition, platforms were resurfaced, tactile markings were added and four new lifts were installed to make the station fully compliant with disability access standards.

== Services ==
East Perth railway station is located on the Midland line, the Airport line, and the Ellenbrook line on the Transperth network. Services on that line will go between Ellenbrook railway station and Perth railway station. Midland line, Airport line, and Ellenbrook line trains stop at the station every 10 minutes during peak on weekdays, and every 15 minutes during the day outside peak every day of the year except Christmas Day. Trains are half-hourly or hourly at night time. The station saw 200,284 passengers in the 2013-14 financial year.

=== Suburban platforms ===
East Perth platform arrangement
Stop ID	Platform	Line	Stopping Pattern	Destination	Via	Notes
99421	1	Airport line	All stations	Claremont	Perth	
99421	1	Ellenbrook line Midland line	All stations	Perth		
99422	2	Airport line	All stations	High Wycombe		
99422	2	Ellenbrook line	All stations	Ellenbrook		
99422	2	Midland line	All stations	Midland		

=== Regional and interstate services ===
East Perth Terminal platform arrangement
Stop ID	Platform	Line	Destination	Via	Stopping Pattern	Notes
95024	1	AvonLink; MerredinLink; Prospector; Indian Pacific	Northam, Merredin, Kalgoorlie, Sydney	Midland	Express services	Indian Pacific runs non stop to Kalgoorlie

The long, approximately 650 m (2,130 ft) platform to the west of platforms 1 and 2 is the East Perth Terminal platform. It is served by regional and interstate trains.

== Bus routes ==
Transperth services

Stop	Route	Destination / description	Notes
East Parade (south bound)	901, 902, 903	Train replacement service to Perth	
East Parade (north bound)	901	Train replacement service to Midland	
East Parade (north bound)	902	Train replacement service to High Wycombe	
East Parade (north bound)	903	Train replacement service to Ellenbrook	

== Coach routes ==
Transwa coach services, departing East Perth Terminal

Stop	Route	Destination / description	Notes
East Perth Terminal	N1 879	to Kalbarri via Midland, Cataby, Port Denison and Geraldton	
East Perth Terminal	N2 851, 891	to Geraldton via Midland, New Norcia and Carnamah	
East Perth Terminal	N3 811	to Geraldton via Midland, Northam, Ballidu, Wubin and Perenjori	
East Perth Terminal	N1 GPE1	to Geraldton via Midland, Cataby and Port Denison	
East Perth Terminal	N5 PG1, PG3	to Geraldton via Joondalup, Cervantes and Dongara	

Stop	Route	Destination / description	Notes
East Perth Terminal	GS1/GS2 411	to Albany via Armadale, Williams, Narrogin, Katanning, Cranbrook and Mount Barker	
East Perth Terminal	GS1 AP Odds	to Albany via Armadale, Williams, Cranbrook and Mount Barker	
East Perth Terminal	GS2 Odds	to Albany via Midland, Northam, York, Brookton, Katanning, Tambellup and Mount Barker	Route 515 terminates at Gnowangerup; Route 531 terminates at Katanning Shire office
East Perth Terminal	GS3 317	to Albany via Cockburn Central, Mandurah, Bunbury, Manjimup, Walpole and Denmark	

Stop	Route	Destination / description	Notes
East Perth Terminal	GE1 EP1	to Esperance via Armadale, Williams, Dumbleyung and Ravensthorpe	
East Perth Terminal	GE1 EP7	to Esperance via Armadale, Williams, Gnowangerup and Ravensthorpe	
East Perth Terminal	GE2 EP3	to Esperance via Midland, Quairading, Hyden and Ravensthorpe	
East Perth Terminal	GE2 EP5	to Esperance via Midland, Quairading, Lake Grace and Ravensthorpe	

Stop	Route	Destination / description	Notes
East Perth Terminal	SW1 Odds	to Pemberton via Cockburn Central, Mandurah, Bunbury, Busselton, Dunsborough, Margaret River and Augusta	Route 279 via Settlers; Route 271S via Siesta Park; Route 277 and 279 terminates at Augusta
East Perth Terminal	SW2 315	to Pemberton via Cockburn Central, Mandurah, Bunbury, Donnybrook, Bridgetown and Manjimup	
East Perth Terminal	SW3 321	to Pemberton via Cockburn Central, Mandurah, Bunbury, Collie, Bridgetown and Manjimup	
