= MerredinLink =

Passenger train between East Perth and Merredin in Western Australia

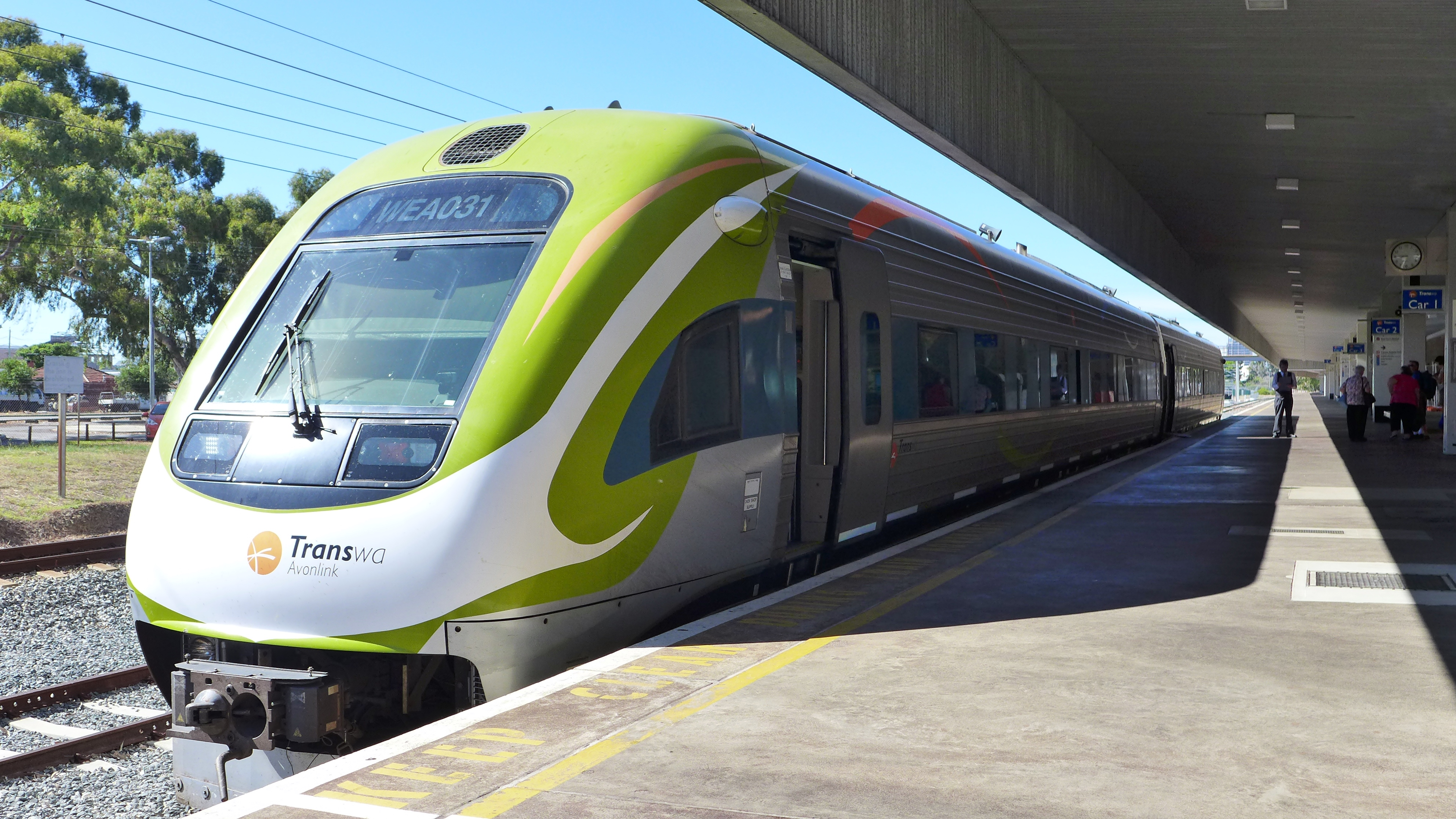
- A MerredinLink train at East Perth in January 2015

Overview
- Service type: Passenger train
- Status: Operational
- Locale: Western Australia
- First service: June 2004
- Current operator: Transwa
- Ridership: 9,228 (year to June 2026)

Route
- Termini: East Perth; Merredin
- Distance travelled: 261 kilometres
- Average journey time: 3 hours 15 minutes
- Service frequency: 3 per week
- Lines used: Eastern; Eastern Goldfields

Technical
- Rolling stock: WEA/WEB railcar
- Track gauge: 1,435 mm (4 ft 8 1/2 in) standard gauge
Route map
Key

The MerredinLink is a rural passenger train service in Western Australia operated by Transwa between East Perth and Merredin.

== History ==
The MerredinLink was introduced in June 2004 when the AvonLink from East Perth was extended from Northam to Merredin on three days a week.

In August 2013, Transwa announced that the MerredinLink would cease with Prospector to make additional stops. However in December 2013 the service was given a reprieve.

In May 2014, it was announced that the service would continue until at least June 2017. To release rolling stock for an enhanced AvonLink service, in December 2014 the MerredinLink was reduced to a Wednesdays only service. From July 2017 it resumed operating three times a week. As at June 2022, it operates on Mondays, Wednesdays and Fridays.

== Rolling stock ==
The MerredinLink is operated by a two-carriage WEA/WEB railcar.

== Ridership ==
The MerredinLink had 8,127 passengers in the year leading up to June 2025.

MerredinLink Annual Patronage
Year	Patronage
2009-10	7,417
2010-11	6,677
2011-12	6,980
2012-13	6,992
2013-14	7,149
2014-15	4,656
2015-16	3,023
2016-17	2,697
2017-18	6,028
2018-19	6,958
2019-20	5,902
2020-21	6,351
2021-22	6,039
2022-23	7,009
2023-24	7,696
2024-25	8,127
2025-26	9,228

== See also ==
- Australind (train service)
