= Bodallin, Western Australia =

Town in the Wheatbelt region of Western Australia

Bodallin
- Town
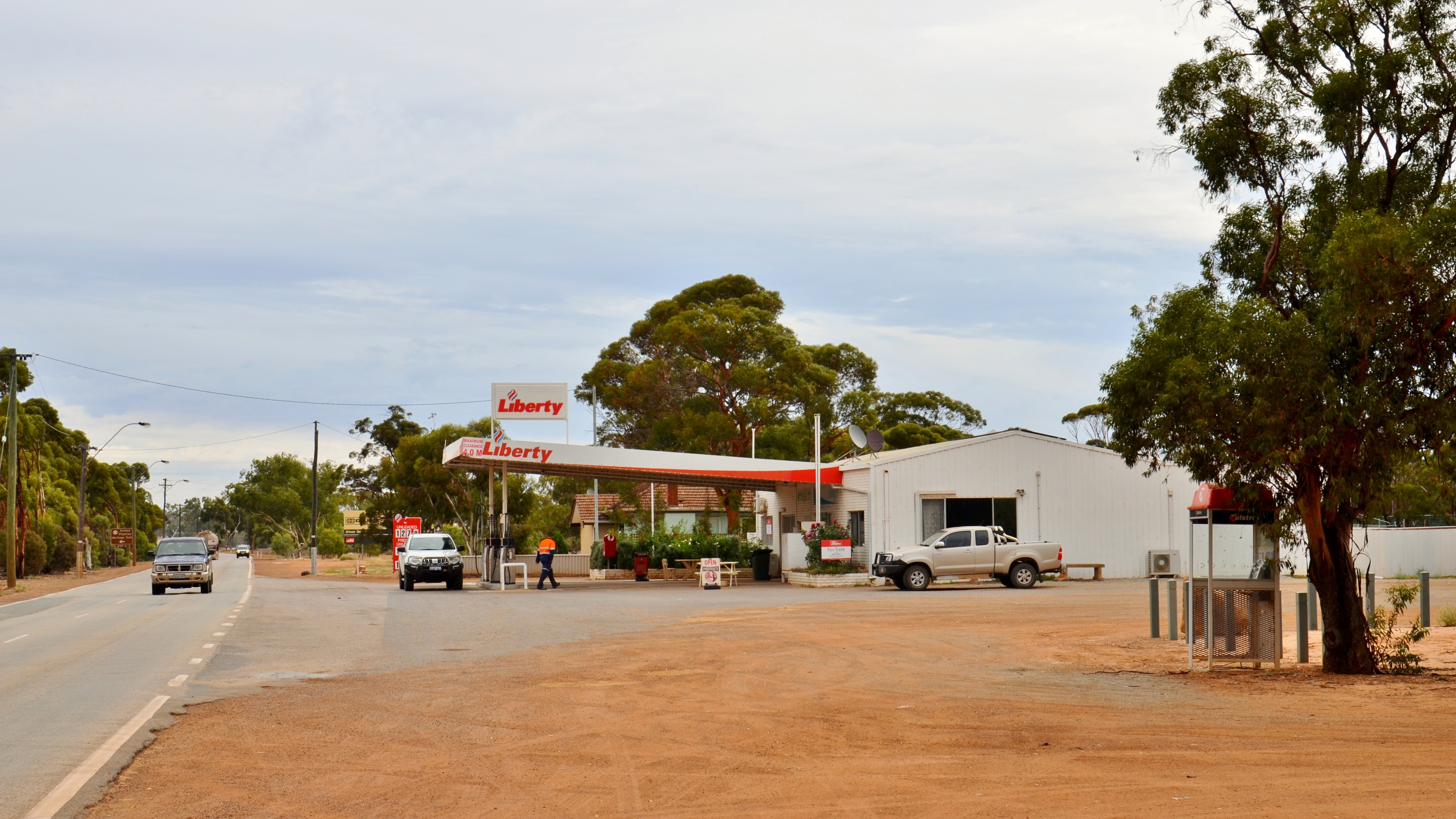
- The Bodallin Roadhouse, 2017

- Interactive map of Bodallin
- Coordinates: 31.371°S 118.851°E
- Country: Australia
- State: Western Australia
- LGA: Shire of Yilgarn
- Location: 323 km (201 mi) east of Perth; 48 km (30 mi) west of Southern Cross; 56 km (35 mi) east of Merredin
- Established: 1918

Government
  - State electorate: Central Wheatbelt
  - Federal division: O'Connor

Area
  - Total: 744.3 km^{2} (287.4 sq mi)
- Elevation: 374 m (1,227 ft)

Population
  - Total: 40 (SAL 2021)
- Postcode: 6424

Bodallin is a town located around halfway between Merredin and Southern Cross in Western Australia.

== History ==
The town takes its name from the railway siding of this name, established between 1894 and 1897. When gazetted in 1918 the town was spelt Boddalin. This was amended in 1947 to Bodallin.

In 1932 the Wheat Pool of Western Australia announced that the town would have two grain elevators, each fitted with an engine, installed at the railway siding.

It is a stop on the Prospector rural train service, and is a location of a crossing loop on the railway.

The main industry in town is wheat farming with the town being a Cooperative Bulk Handling receival site.

== Rail services ==
The Prospector service, which runs each way between East Perth and Kalgoorlie once or twice each day, stops at Bodallin.

Preceding station	Transwa	Following station
Carrabin towards East Perth	Prospector	Moorine Rock towards Kalgoorlie

== See also ==
- Eastern Goldfields Railway
