= Leioproctus ignicolor =

Scientific classification
- Kingdom: Animalia
- Phylum: Arthropoda
- Clade: Pancrustacea
- Class: Insecta
- Order: Hymenoptera
- Family: Colletidae
- Genus: Leioproctus
- Species: L. ignicolor

Binomial name
- Leioproctus ignicolor Maynard 1992

Species of bee

Leioproctus ignicolor, or Leioproctus (Cladocerapis) ignicolor, is a species of bee in the family Colletidae and subfamily Colletinae. It is endemic to Australia. It was described by Australian entomologist Glynn Maynard in 1992.

== Etymology ==
The specific epithet ignicolor (Latin: "fire" + "coloured") is an anatomical reference to the metasoma.

== Description ==
Female body length is about 10 mm, male body length 8 mm. Integumental colouration is mainly black, the metasoma orange-red with black apex; the hair is white and black.

== Distribution and habitat ==
The species occurs in Western Australia. The type locality is Boorabbin Rock.

== Behaviour ==
The adults are flying mellivores. Flowering plants visited by the bees include Persoonia saundersiana and Persoonia teretifolia.

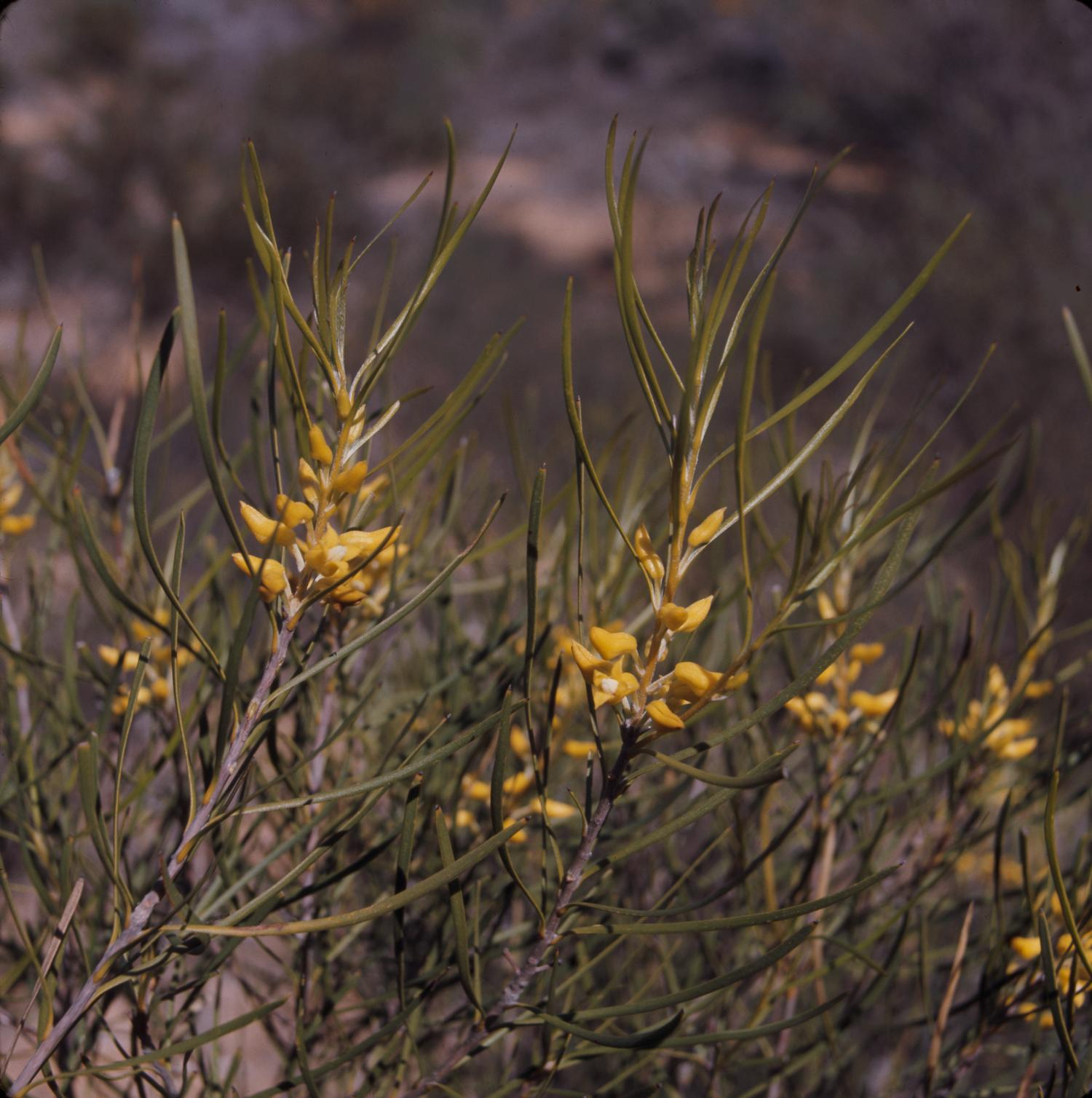
Flowers of Persoonia saundersiana, a forage plant of the bees

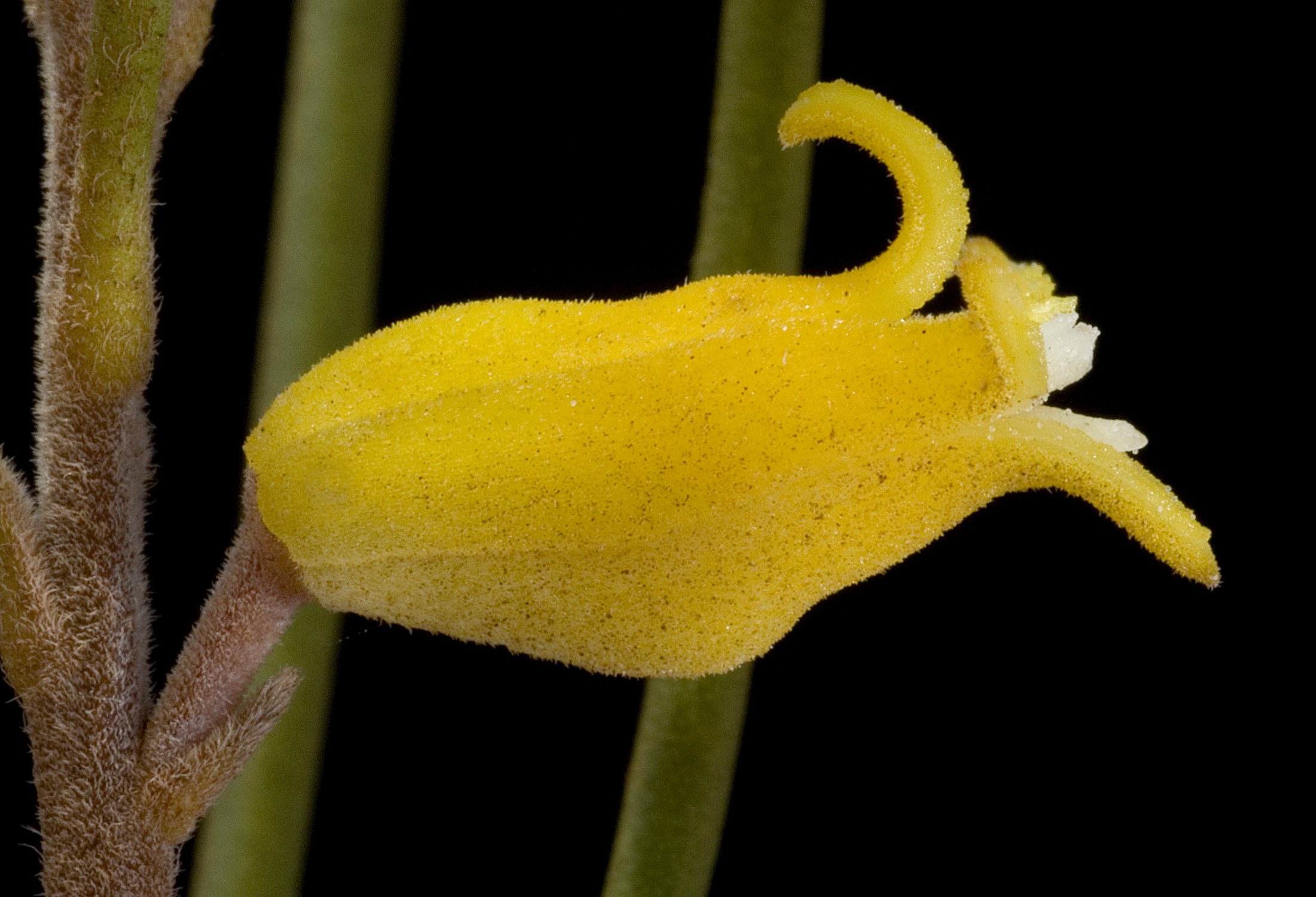
Flower of Persoonia teretifolia, a forage plant of the bees
