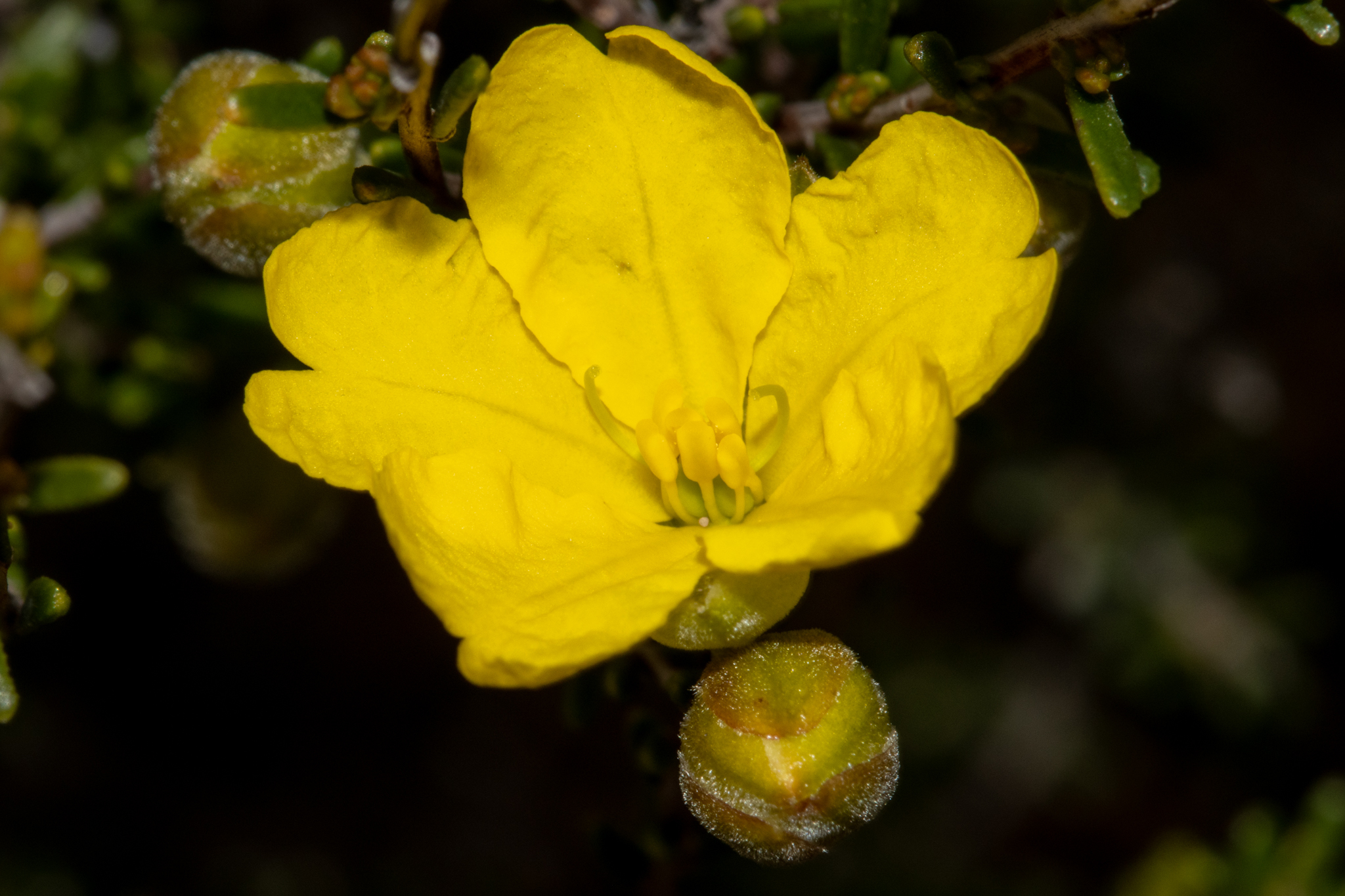

Conservation status
- Priority Three — Poorly Known Taxa (DEC)

Scientific classification
- Kingdom: Plantae
- Clade: Tracheophytes
- Clade: Angiosperms
- Clade: Eudicots
- Order: Dilleniales
- Family: Dilleniaceae
- Genus: Hibbertia
- Species: H. glabriuscula

Binomial name
- Hibbertia glabriuscula J.R.Wheeler

= Hibbertia glabriuscula =

Species of flowering plant

Hibbertia glabriuscula is a species of flowering plant in the family Dilleniaceae and is endemic to the south-west of Western Australia. It is a small, erect shrub with thick, oblong leaves and yellow flowers borne singly on the ends of branchlets, with six to twelve stamens arranged around the two carpels.

== Description ==
Hibbertia glabriuscula is a erect shrub that typically grows to a height of 50 cm (20 in) with glabrous branchlets. The leaves are thick, oblong, 2–5.5 mm (0.079–0.217 in) long and 1–1.4 mm (0.039–0.055 in) wide on a short, hairy petiole with the edges rolled down and obscuring the lower surface. The flowers are 10–20 mm (0.39–0.79 in) wide, borne singly on the ends of branchlets on a peduncle 1–3 mm (0.039–0.118 in) long with narrow elliptic bracts 1–3.5 mm (0.039–0.138 in) long. The five sepals are joined at the base, elliptic and 5–7 mm (0.20–0.28 in) long. The five petals are yellow, egg-shaped with the narrower end towards the base, 6–10 mm (0.24–0.39 in) long with a notch at the tip. There are six to twelve stamens arranged around the two carpels, each carpel containing four to six ovules. Flowering has been observed in September.

== Taxonomy ==
Hibbertia glabriuscula was first formally described in 1994 by Judy Wheeler in the journal Nuytsia from specimens she collected south of Carrabin in 1989. The specific epithet (glabriuscula) is the diminutive of the Latin word "glaber" meaning glabrous, referring to the absence of long hairs on the sepals and bracts, compared to those on the close relative H. drummondii.

== Distribution and habitat ==
This hibbertia grows in sandy soil in heath and shrubland and has only been recorded near Carrabin in the Avon Wheatbelt and Mallee biogeographic regions of south-western Western Australia.

== Conservation status ==
Hibbertia glabriuscula is classified as "Priority Three" by the Government of Western Australia Department of Parks and Wildlife meaning that it is poorly known and known from only a few locations but is not under imminent threat.

== See also ==
- List of Hibbertia species
