= Acacia consanguinea =

Scientific classification
- Kingdom: Plantae
- Clade: Tracheophytes
- Clade: Angiosperms
- Clade: Eudicots
- Clade: Rosids
- Order: Fabales
- Family: Fabaceae
- Subfamily: Caesalpinioideae
- Clade: Mimosoid clade
- Genus: Acacia
- Species: A. consanguinea

Binomial name
- Acacia consanguinea R.S.Cowan & Maslin
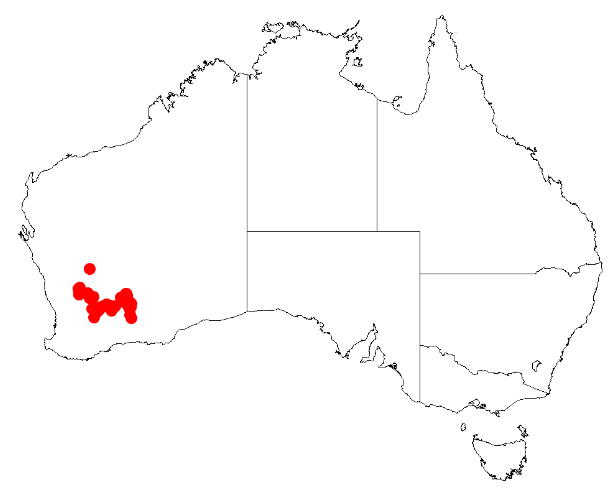
- Occurrence data from AVH

Synonyms
- Racosperma consanguineum (R.S.Cowan & Maslin) Pedley

Species of legume

Acacia consanguinea is a species of flowering plant in the family Fabaceae and is endemic to the south-west of Western Australia. It is a shrub with ascending to erect, straight to curved, terete phyllodes with a curved to hooked tip, spherical heads of golden yellow flowers and glabrous, linear, thinly papery pods.

== Description ==
Acacia consanguinea is a spreading, often rounded shrub that typically grows to a height of 0.4–1.5 m (1 ft 4 in – 4 ft 11 in) and has terete, ash grey branchlets. Its phyllodes are ascending to erect, straight to slightly curved, mostly 20–45 mm (0.79–1.77 in) long and 1.0–1.5 mm (0.039–0.059 in) in diameter, with a curved to hooked tip. There are stipules at the base of the phyllode but that fall off as the phyllodes mature. The flowers are borne in two spherical heads in axils on a peduncle 2–5 mm (0.079–0.197 in) long, each head 4–5 mm (0.16–0.20 in) in diameter with 14 to 29 golden yellow flowers. Flowering occurs in August and September, and the pods are thinly papery, strongly raised on alternating sides and more or less constricted between the seeds, slightly curved and wavy, 30–60 mm (1.2–2.4 in) long and 2.5–3.0 mm (0.098–0.118 in) wide. The seeds are broadly elliptic, about 2 mm (0.079 in) long and glossy with an aril on the end.

== Taxonomy ==
Acacia consanguinea was first formally described in 1995 by Richard Cowan and Bruce Maslin in the journal Nuytsia from specimens collected in 1971 by Maslin, 10 km (6.2 mi) west of Bullabulling towards Caenyie Rock. The specific epithet (consanguinea) means 'related by blood', referring to the species' close relationship with other species of Acacia.

This species belongs to the Acacia fragilis group related to A. fragilis and A. uncinella, in the Section Plurinerves.

== Distribution and habitat ==
This species of wattle is native to the Avon Wheatbelt, Coolgardie and Murchison bioregions of Western Australia where it grows on low rises and plains in sandy or sometimes gravelly soils. Its range extends from around Muntadgin in the west to as far east as Coolgardie, with at least one outlying population found around Wialki much further to the north where it is usually occurs in scrub or heath communities.

== See also ==
- List of Acacia species
