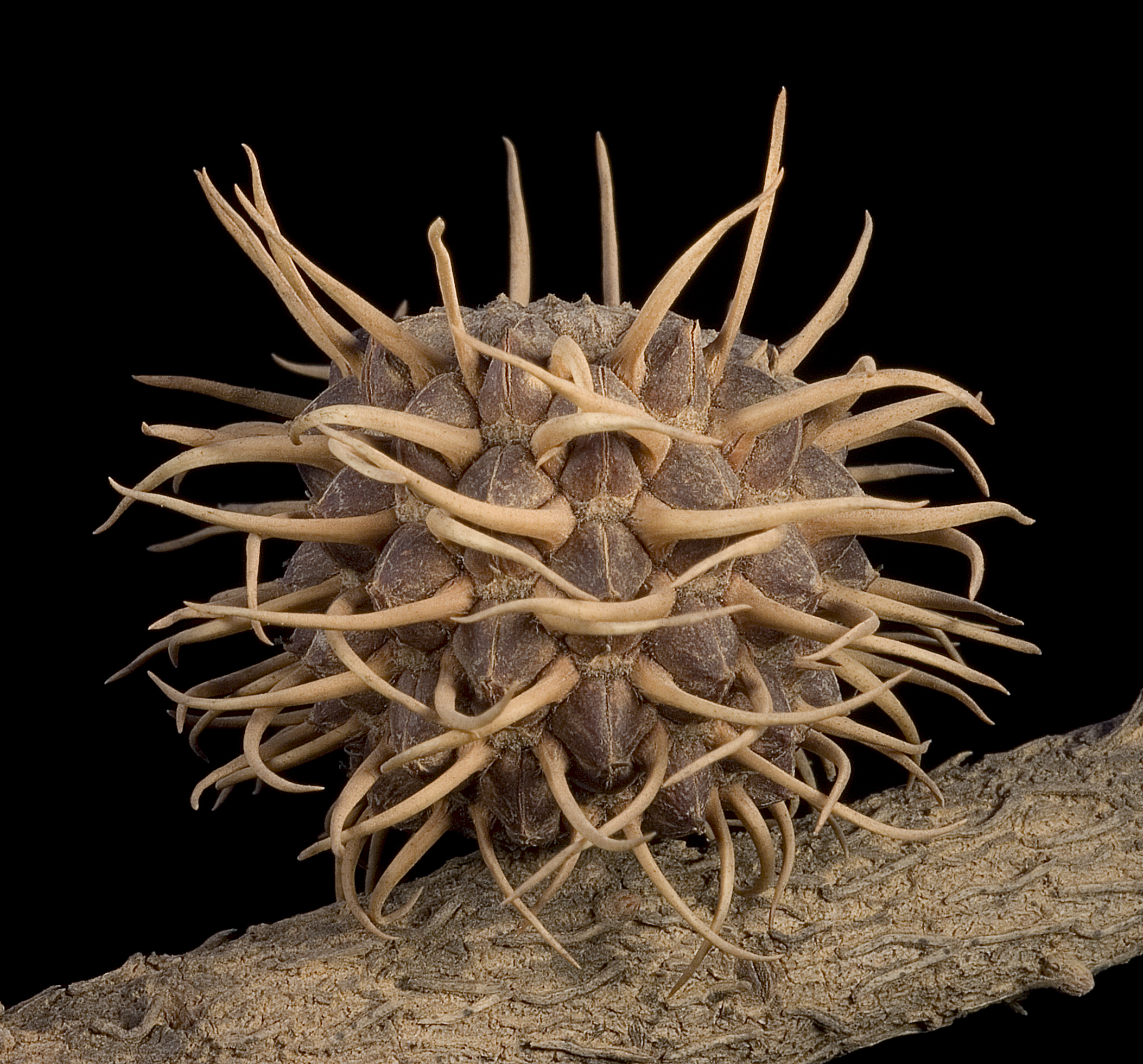
- Mature fruiting cone

Scientific classification
- Kingdom: Plantae
- Clade: Tracheophytes
- Clade: Angiosperms
- Clade: Eudicots
- Clade: Rosids
- Order: Fagales
- Family: Casuarinaceae
- Genus: Allocasuarina
- Species: A. spinosissima

Binomial name
- Allocasuarina spinosissima (C.A.Gardner) L.A.S.Johnson
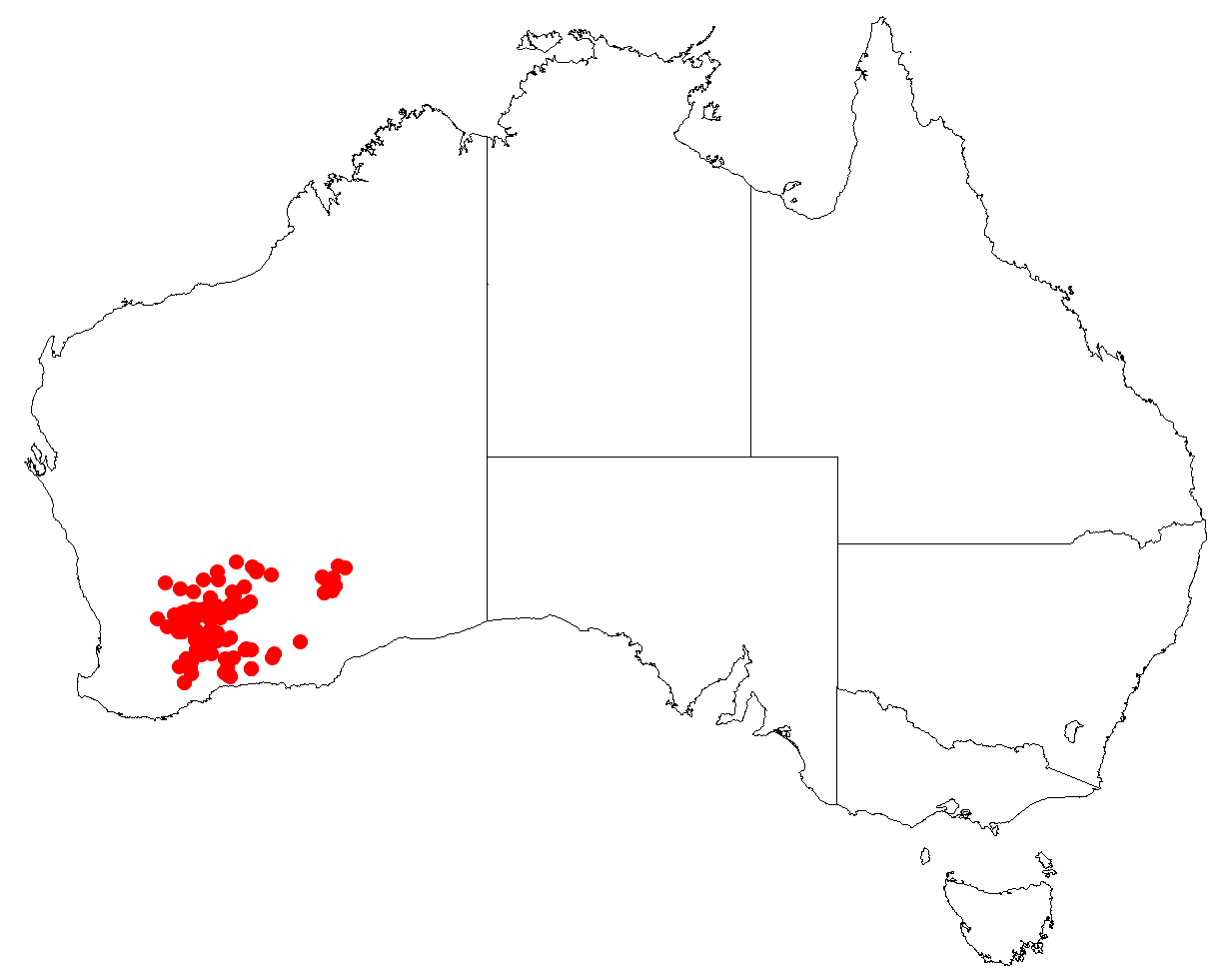
- Occurrence data from AVH

Synonyms
- Casuarina spinosissima C.A.Gardner

= Allocasuarina spinosissima =

Species of flowering plant

Allocasuarina spinosissima is a species of flowering plant in the family Casuarinaceae and is endemic to Western Australia. It is a monoecious shrub with its leaves reduced to overlapping scales in whorls of nine to eleven, the mature fruiting cones 10–23 mm (0.39–0.91 in) long, containing winged seeds 5.5–7.0 mm (0.22–0.28 in) long.

== Description ==
Allocasuarina spinosissima is a monoecious shrub that typically grows to a height of 2–4 m (6 ft 7 in – 13 ft 1 in). Its branchlets are more or less erect, up to 260 mm (10 in) long, the leaves reduced to overlapping scale-like teeth 0.5–1.0 mm (0.020–0.039 in) long, arranged in whorls of nine to eleven around the needle-like branchlets. The sections of branchlet between the leaf whorls are 8–13 mm (0.31–0.51 in) long and 1.0–1.8 mm (0.039–0.071 in) wide. Male flowers are arranged in spikes 15–30 mm (0.59–1.18 in) long, with seven or eight whorls per centimetre (per 0.39 in.), the anthers 0.8–1.3 mm (0.031–0.051 in) long. Female cones are sessile or on a peduncle up to 6 mm (0.24 in) long, the mature cones 10–23 mm (0.39–0.91 in) long and 8–12 mm (0.31–0.47 in) in diameter, with sharply pointed, curved awns near the base of the bracteoles, but that falls off as the cone matures. The winged seeds are dark brown and 5.5–7.0 mm (0.22–0.28 in) long.

== Taxonomy ==
This sheoak was first formally described in 1923 by Charles Gardner who gave it the name Casuarina spinosissima in the Journal and Proceedings of the Royal Society of Western Australia from specimens he collected near Carrabin in 1922. It was reclassified in 1982 as Allocasuarina spinosissima by Lawrie Johnson in the Flora of Australia. The specific epithet (spinosissima) means "very spiny".

== Distribution and habitat ==
Allocasuarina spinosissima grows in heath on sandplains and is widespread between Southern Cross, Norseman and Queen Victoria Spring in the Avon Wheatbelt, Coolgardie, Esperance Plains, Great Victoria Desert, Mallee and Murchison Coastal Plain bioregions of Western Australia.

== Conservation status ==
Allocasuarina spinosissima is listed as "not threatened" by the Western Australian Government Department of Biodiversity, Conservation and Attractions.
