= Acacia crenulata =

Conservation status
- Priority Three — Poorly Known Taxa (DEC)

Scientific classification
- Kingdom: Plantae
- Clade: Tracheophytes
- Clade: Angiosperms
- Clade: Eudicots
- Clade: Rosids
- Order: Fabales
- Family: Fabaceae
- Subfamily: Caesalpinioideae
- Clade: Mimosoid clade
- Genus: Acacia
- Species: A. crenulata

Binomial name
- Acacia crenulata R.S.Cowan & Maslin
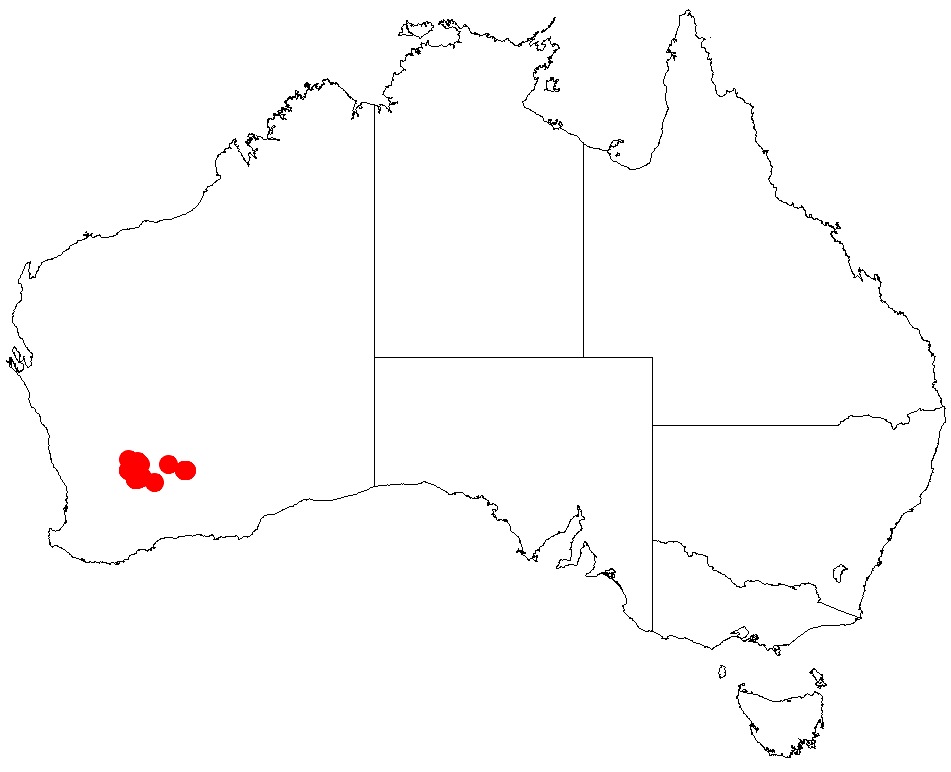
- Occurrence data from AVH

Synonyms
- Racosperma crenulatum (R.S.Cowan & Maslin) Pedley

Species of legume

Acacia crenulata is a species of flowering plant in the family Fabaceae and is endemic to the a small area in the south-west of Western Australia. It is a bushy, rounded shrub or tree with glabrous, wavy, ribbed branchlets, narrowly elliptic to linear phyllodes, spherical heads of golden yellow flowers and linear to slightly curved pods.

== Description ==
Acacia crenulata is a bushy, rounded shrub or tree that typically grows to a height of 0.7–3 m (2 ft 4 in – 9 ft 10 in) and has glabrous, ribbed, wavy branchlets. The phyllodes are narrowly elliptic to linear-elliptic, 30–60 mm (1.2–2.4 in) long and 2–6 mm (0.079–0.236 in) wide with wavy, resinous edges and a prominent central vein with many indistinct closely parallel secondary veins. The flowers are borne in one or two spherical heads on peduncles 1–2 mm (0.039–0.079 in) long, each head abour 4 mm (0.16 in) in diameter with 20 to 25 golden yellow flowers. Flowering has been recorded in September and October, and the pods are linear, straight to slightly curved, thinly leathery to crust-like, up to 45 mm (1.8 in) long and 3–4 mm (0.12–0.16 in) wide and glabrous. The seeds are oblong to egg-shaped, about 2.5 mm (0.098 in) long and mottled with a yellow aril.

== Taxonomy ==
Acacia crenulata was first formally described in 1999 by Richard Sumner Cowan and Bruce Maslin in the journal Nuytsia from specimens collected by Maslin 5.5 km (3.4 mi) east of Carrabin in 1992. The specific epithet (crenulata) means 'crenulate', a term commonly applied to leaf margins with rounded teeth, alluding to the edges of the phyllodes.

== Distribution and habitat ==
This species of wattle is only known from Chiddarcooping - Walyahmoning Rock areas about 30 km (19 mi) west of Southern Cross and near Bullabulling in the Avon Wheatbelt and Coolgardie bioregions, where it mostly grows in heavy soils and sandy clay-loam on rocky outcrops, often in association with low, Eucalyptus wandoo woodland and other species of Acacia, Allocasuarina campestris and Melaleuca uncinata.

== See also ==
- List of Acacia species
