= Moorine Rock, Western Australia =

Moorine Rock
- Town
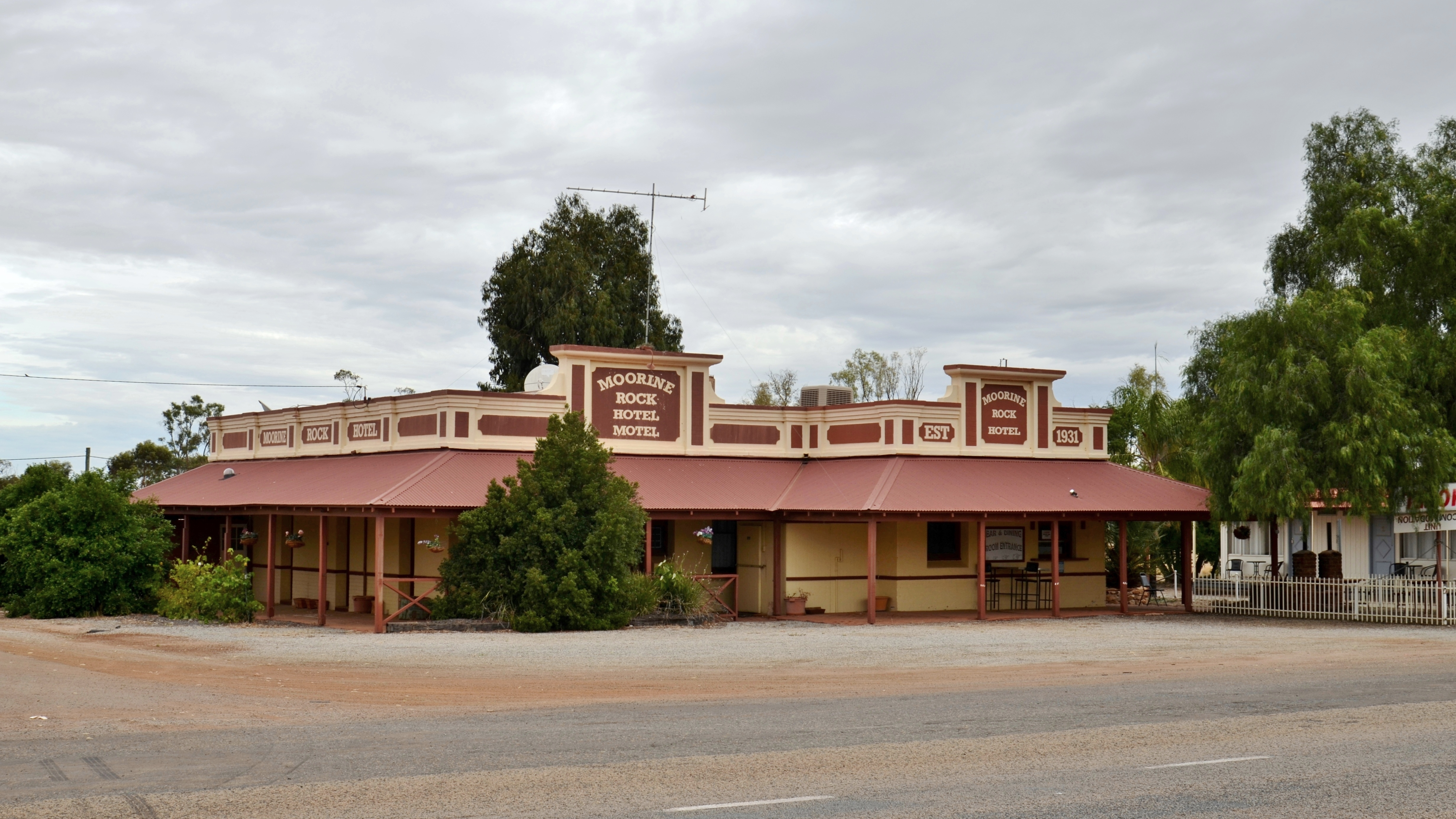
- Moorine Rock Hotel Motel, 2017

- Interactive map of Moorine Rock
- Coordinates: 31°19′1″S 119°4′34″E
- Country: Australia
- State: Western Australia
- LGA: Shire of Yilgarn
- Location: 347 km (216 mi) E of Perth; 22 km (14 mi) WSW of Southern Cross; 83 km (52 mi) E of Merredin
- Established: 1925

Government
  - State electorate: Central Wheatbelt
  - Federal division: O'Connor

Area
  - Total: 691.7 km^{2} (267.1 sq mi)
- Elevation: 377 m (1,237 ft)

Population
  - Total: 61 (SAL 2021)
- Postcode: 6425

Moorine Rock is located in the eastern agricultural region of Western Australia, 347 km east of Perth and 22 km west south west of Southern Cross.

== Location ==
It is located on the Great Eastern Highway and the railway line from Northam to Southern Cross. When the line was opened in 1895 a railway station was established here and named Parkers Road after a nearby road. The road led to Parker Range, an area where Mr W M Parker made a gold find in 1888. In 1923 the district surveyor for the area reported there was a need to survey some lots at Parkers Road station. The survey was carried out the following year, and in 1925 the area was gazetted as the townsite of Parker Road.

== Name ==
In 1926 the local member of Parliament advised the name of the townsite was causing confusion because it was too similar to Parker Range, a nearby goldmining area, and was also the name of a road in Southern Cross. He suggested the alternative name of Moorine, after Moorine Rock. This name was too similar to Moora, but was accepted with the full name Moorine Rock. The change of name of the townsite was gazetted in 1926. Moorine Rock is the Aboriginal name of some rocks near the townsite, first recorded by an explorer in 1865. The meaning of the name is not known.

== Services ==
In 1932 the Wheat Pool of Western Australia announced that the town would have two grain elevators, each fitted with an engine, installed at the railway siding.

The surrounding areas produce wheat and other cereal crops. The town is a receival site for Cooperative Bulk Handling.

=== Rail ===
The Prospector service, which runs each way between East Perth and Kalgoorlie once or twice each day, stops at Moorine Rock.

Preceding station	Transwa	Following station
Bodallin towards East Perth	Prospector	Southern Cross towards Kalgoorlie
