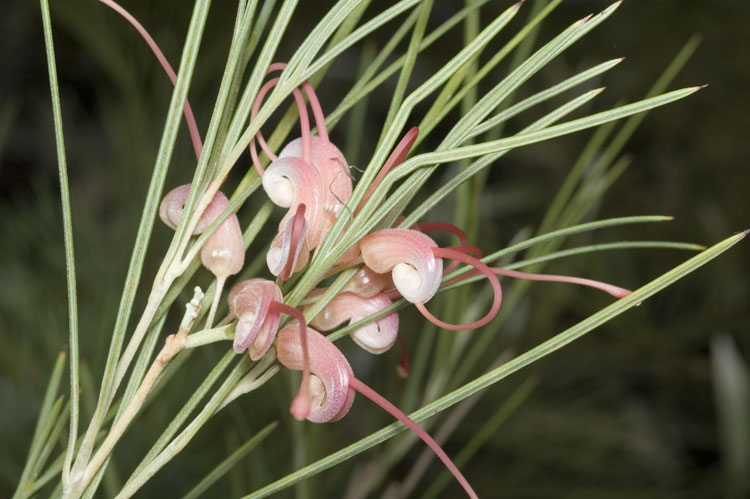
- In the Australian National Botanic Gardens

Scientific classification
- Kingdom: Plantae
- Clade: Tracheophytes
- Clade: Angiosperms
- Clade: Eudicots
- Order: Proteales
- Family: Proteaceae
- Genus: Grevillea
- Species: G. oncogyne

Binomial name
- Grevillea oncogyne Diels

= Grevillea oncogyne =

Species of shrub endemic to Western Australia

Grevillea oncogyne is a species of flowering plant in the family Proteaceae and is endemic to inland areas of Western Australia. It is an erect to spreading shrub with linear, sometimes lobed leaves, and clusters of red or pinkish red flowers.

== Description ==
Grevillea oncogyne is an erect to spreading shrub that typically grows to a height of 0.6–3 m (2 ft 0 in – 9 ft 10 in) and sometimes forms a lignotuber. Its leaves are linear, mostly 50–120 mm (2.0–4.7 in) long and 1–2 mm (0.039–0.079 in) wide, sometimes with two to four linear lobes 50–90 mm (2.0–3.5 in) long. The edges of the leaves are rolled under, obscuring the lower surface. The flowers are arranged in leaf axils or on old wood on a silky-hairy rachis 5–30 mm (0.20–1.18 in) long. The flowers are red or pinkish red, the pistil 36–40 mm (1.4–1.6 in) long. Flowering mainly occurs from October to December and the fruit a follicle 7–15 mm (0.28–0.59 in) long with prominent ridges on one side.

== Taxonomy ==
Grevillea oncogyne was first formally described in 1904 by Ludwig Diels in Ernst Georg Pritzel's Botanische Jahrbücher für Systematik, Pflanzengeschichte und Pflanzengeographie. The specific epithet (oncogyne) means "swollen woman", referring to swellings on the ovary.

== Distribution and habitat ==
This grevillea grows on rocky outcrops in mallee woodlands and shrublands between Boorabbin, Coolgardie, Salmon Gums, Lake King and Hyden in the Avon Wheatbelt, Coolgardie, Esperance Plains and Mallee bioregions of inland south-western Western Australia.

== Conservation status ==
Grevillea inconspicua is listed as "not threatened" by the Government of Western Australia Department of Biodiversity, Conservation and Attractions.

== See also ==
- List of Grevillea species
