= Xanthoparmelia baeomycesica =

Scientific classification
- Kingdom: Fungi
- Division: Ascomycota
- Class: Lecanoromycetes
- Order: Lecanorales
- Family: Parmeliaceae
- Genus: Xanthoparmelia
- Species: X. baeomycesica

Binomial name
- Xanthoparmelia baeomycesica Elix (2006)
- Holotype: Boorabbin National Park, Western Australia

Species of foliose lichen

Xanthoparmelia baeomycesica is a species of saxicolous (rock-dwelling) foliose lichen in the family Parmeliaceae, described as a new species in 2006. It is recognised for its unique chemical properties and distinct habitat in the Western Australian granite outcrops.

== Taxonomy ==
Xanthoparmelia baeomycesica was identified and named by in 2006 by the lichenologist John Elix. The species epithet baeomycesica is derived from its chemical profile, in particular the presence of methyl baeomycesate, a rare lichen product. The type specimen was collected by Elix at Boorabbin rock in Boorabbin National Park, Western Australia.

== Description ==
Xanthoparmelia baeomycesica has a foliose, tightly attached thallus ranging from 3 to 5 cm in width. The lobes are contiguous to weakly imbricate (overlapping), flat to weakly convex, and range from ssomewhat linear to somewhat irregularly shaped, measuring 0.4–1.0 mm wide. The upper thallus surface starts yellow-green and darkens with age, featuring smooth to rugulose textures and becoming areolate in the thallus centre. It lacks the vegetative propagules that often occur in lichens: soredia, isidia, and lobules.

The medulla is white, and the lower surface varies from ivory to pale brown, darkening at the tips. Rhizines (root-like structure for attachments) are sparse to moderate, simple, and the same colour as the thallus, measuring 0.1–0.3 mm long. The species does not typically produce apothecia (fruiting bodies).

Chemically, the cortex reacts with potassium hydroxide (K-) and the medulla exhibits a yellow then red reaction with K+. In addition to the characteristic methyl baeomycesate, it contains usnic acid, atranorin, and significant amounts of constipatic and protoconstipatic acids, alongside minor components such as elatinic acid.

== Habitat and distribution ==
Xanthoparmelia baeomycesica is found primarily on granite substrates (particularly inselbergs) within Boorabbin National Park, situated along the Great Eastern Highway in Western Australia. It grows in Allocasuarina and Acacia woodlands, often in areas with large granite monoliths.

== See also ==
- List of Xanthoparmelia species
