= Harry Anstey =

Australian metallurgist, politician

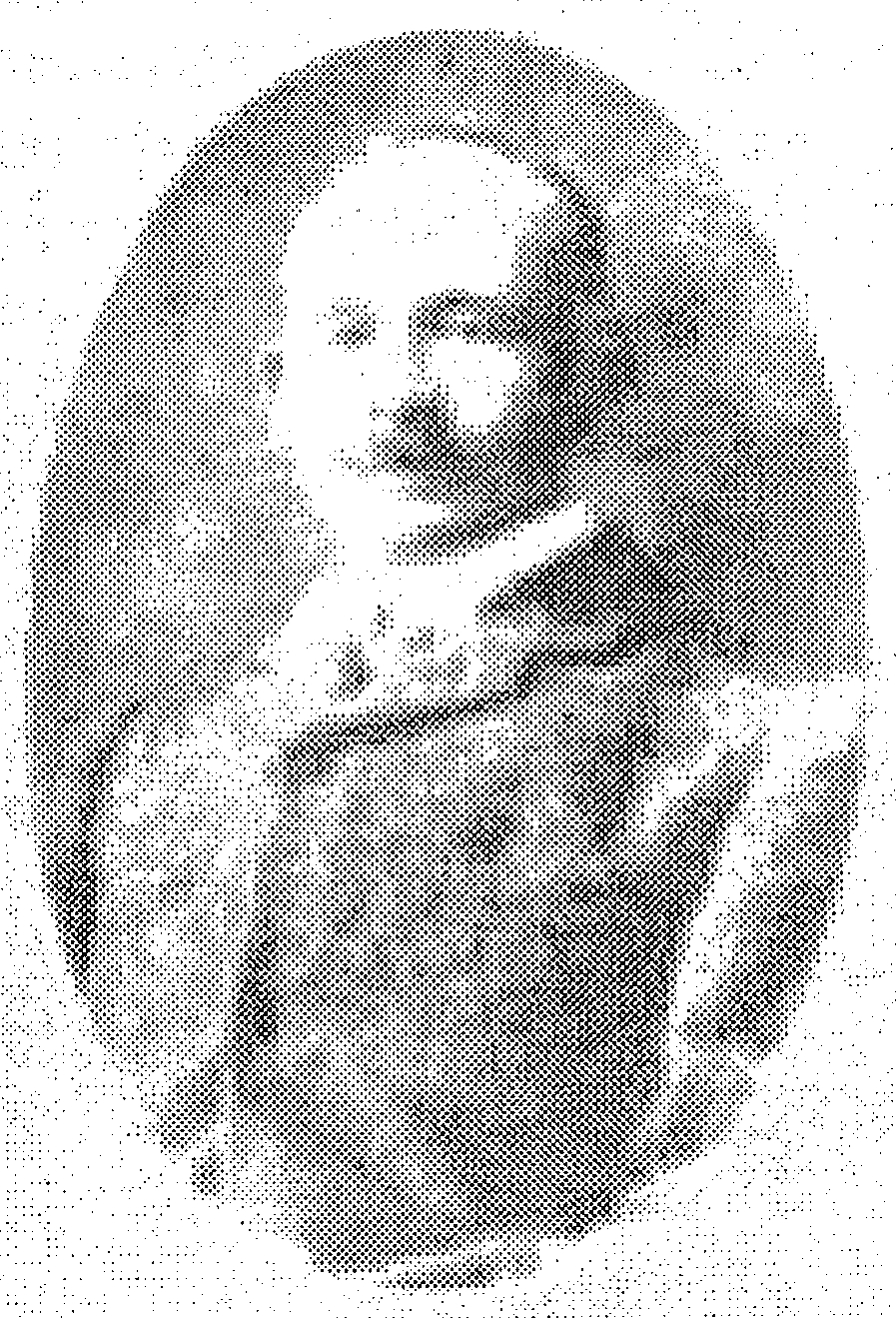
Harry Anstey

Harry Francis Anstey (24 July 1847 – 6 July 1927) was a metallurgist and gold prospector who led the prospecting expedition that discovered gold in the Yilgarn, leading to the gold rush that established Western Australia's Eastern Goldfields.

Born in England in 1847, Anstey was educated at Rugby from 1863 to 1865. In 1877, he was living in Earl's Court, Kensington, Middlesex and working as a civil engineer; that year he married Edith Euphemia Carnegie. Anstey arrived in Western Australia on Yeoman in June 1887, and set up a metallurgical laboratory in Perth.

Shortly afterwards, Anstey was invited to join the prospectors Richard Greaves and Edward Payne in a prospecting expedition to Bindoon. Soon after their return, news reached Perth that a Yilgarn station owner had found a nugget while sinking a well. In response to this news, a prospecting syndicate was formed, and the party was sent to the Yilgarn, with Anstey in command. Initially Payne found a speck of gold. Greaves, starting from Payne's initial find, located the reef on 22 October. Greaves and Payne set about digging the reef, 60 km (37 mi) northwest of the current town of Southern Cross. The discovery prompted the gold rush that established Southern Cross and the Yilgarn Goldfield, and led to the subsequent rich finds at Coolgardie and Kalgoorlie that established the Eastern Goldfields. Anstey collected the £500 reward, while the syndicate funders recovered £50 through the courts and £5 was given to Greaves. It is not known what happened to the remaining £445.

After returning to Perth, Anstey was appointed Government Assayer in 1889. In 1890 he was living in the Cockburn Sound area, and from 1893 he was a farmer at Jarrahdale. From 22 August 1893 until July 1894, Anstey was a nominated member of the Western Australian Legislative Council. On 16 July 1894, he contested the Legislative Council seat of South West Province but was unsuccessful. In subsequent years he speculated in real estate in Claremont and Bassendean, but in 1898 financial difficulties prompted him to sell his properties and move to Cardup, where he became an orchardist.

In 1899, Anstey returned to England. Some time in the early 1910s he moved to Camberley, Surrey. After his wife died in 1926, he retired to Falmouth. He died on 6 July 1927 in a private nursing home in London.
