= Hibbertia chartacea =

Conservation status
- Priority Two — Poorly Known Taxa (DEC)

Scientific classification
- Kingdom: Plantae
- Clade: Tracheophytes
- Clade: Angiosperms
- Clade: Eudicots
- Order: Dilleniales
- Family: Dilleniaceae
- Genus: Hibbertia
- Species: H. chartacea

Binomial name
- Hibbertia chartacea J.R.Wheeler

Species of flowering plant

Hibbertia chartacea is a species of flowering plant in the family Dilleniaceae and is endemic to a restricted area of Western Australia. It is a shrub with glaucous, narrow oblong to narrow egg-shaped leaves and yellow flowers arranged on the ends of short side shoots with eleven stamens arranged in groups around the three carpels.

== Description ==
Hibbertia chartacea is a shrub that typically grows to a height of up to 50 cm (20 in) with hairy new growth. The leaves are arranged in clusters, sessile, narrow oblong to narrow egg-shaped with the narrower end towards the base, 5–8 mm (0.20–0.31 in) long and 0.5–0.8 mm (0.020–0.031 in) wide. The flowers are arranged on the ends of short side shoots and are 7–15 mm (0.28–0.59 in) wide with up to three broadly egg-shaped to more or less round bracts 2–3 mm (0.079–0.118 in) in diameter. The five sepals are often brown, broadly elliptic, the outer sepals 3.5–4.0 mm (0.14–0.16 in) long and 2.5–3.5 mm (0.098–0.138 in) wide, the inner sepals slightly longer and wider. The five petals are yellow, 4.5–8 mm (0.18–0.31 in) long and egg-shaped with the narrower end towards the base. The eleven stamens are arranged in three groups of three and two single stamens. The three carpels are more or less spherical and there is one ovule in each carpel. Flowering has been recorded in September.

== Taxonomy ==
Hibbertia chartacea was first formally described in 2004 by Judith R. Wheeler in the journal Nuytsia from specimens collected 23 km (14 mi) east of Bruce Rock in 2001. The specific epithet (chartacea) means "papery", referring to the texture of the sepals and bracts.

== Distribution and habitat ==
This species has been recorded in shrubland and mallee shrubland from near Carrabin to near Bruce Rock in the Avon Wheatbelt biogeographic region.

== Conservation status ==
Hibbertia chartacea is classified as "Priority Two" by the Western Australian Government Department of Parks and Wildlife meaning that it is poorly known and from only one or a few locations.

== See also ==
- List of Hibbertia species
