= Boorabbin, Western Australia =

Ghost town in Western Australia

Boorabbin was a location on the narrow gauge Eastern Goldfields Railway in Western Australia. It was halfway between Southern Cross and Coolgardie.

It was the location of a water tank used during the era of steam power on the railways. Construction of the tank began in 1896; it had a capacity of five and a quarter million gallons.

The townsite was gazetted in 1898. It was named by C.C. Hunt in 1865.

It is in the area of the Boorabbin National Park, and Boorabbin Rocks.

The locality was identified as the nearest to a tragedy on the Great Eastern Highway when three truck drivers were killed by bushfire across the highway in 2007.
