= Acacia armigera =

Fierce wattle

Conservation status
- Priority One — Poorly Known Taxa (DEC)

Scientific classification
- Kingdom: Plantae
- Clade: Tracheophytes
- Clade: Angiosperms
- Clade: Eudicots
- Clade: Rosids
- Order: Fabales
- Family: Fabaceae
- Subfamily: Caesalpinioideae
- Clade: Mimosoid clade
- Genus: Acacia
- Species: A. armigera

Binomial name
- Acacia armigera R.W.Davis, K.R.Thiele & Cockerton

Species of legume

Acacia armigera, commonly known as fierce wattle , is a species of flowering plant in the family Fabaceae and is endemic to a restricted area of inland Western Australia. It is a dense, rounded shrub with rigid, sharply-pointed phyllodes that are pentagonal in cross section, spherical heads of bright yellow flowers, and pods that are round in cross section, and up to 40 mm (1.6 in) long.

== Description ==
Acacia armigera is a dense, rounded shrub that typically grows to a 0.8–1 m (2 ft 7 in – 3 ft 3 in) high and 1–2 m (3 ft 3 in – 6 ft 7 in) wide. Its phyllodes are pentagonal in cross section with equal faces and sharply-pointed, 13–34 mm (0.51–1.34 in) long and 1.0–1.2 mm (0.039–0.047 in) wide. The flowers are bright yellow and borne pairs in axils 10–24 mm (0.39–0.94 in) long on peduncles 4.5–7.5 mm (0.18–0.30 in) long, each head with 17 to 23 flowers. Flowering has been observed in late August and the pods are crusty, curved, round in cross section, 32–40 mm (1.3–1.6 in) long and 2.5–3.0 mm (0.098–0.118 in) wide.

== Taxonomy ==
Acacia armigera was first formally described by the Robert Wayne Davis, Kevin R. Thiele and Geoff T.B. Cockerton in 2023 in the journal Nuytsia from specimens collected by Thiele and Cockerton near Mount Dimer, north of Southern Cross in 2021. The specific epithet (armigera) means 'bearing thorns, or armed'.

== Distribution ==
Fierce wattle is only known from the type location near Mount Dimer where it grows in open woodland on red-brown clay in the Coolgardie bioregion of inland Western Australia.

== Conservation status ==
This Acacia species is classified as 'Priority One' by the Government of Western Australia Department of Parks and Wildlife, meaning that it is known from only one or a few locations which are potentially at risk.

== See also ==
- List of Acacia species
