= C. polyclada =

C. polyclada may refer to:

- Calceolaria polyclada, a lady's purse
- Canna polyclada, a garden plant
- Crataegus polyclada, a hawthorn native to eastern North America
- Cryptandra polyclada, a buckthorn shrub
