= Pimelea neokyrea =

Conservation status
- Priority Two — Poorly Known Taxa (DEC)

Scientific classification
- Kingdom: Plantae
- Clade: Tracheophytes
- Clade: Angiosperms
- Clade: Eudicots
- Clade: Rosids
- Order: Malvales
- Family: Thymelaeaceae
- Genus: Pimelea
- Species: P. neokyrea

Binomial name
- Pimelea neokyrea Rye

Species of flowering plant

Pimelea neokyrea is a species of flowering plant in the family Thymelaeaceae and is endemic to the southwest of Western Australia. It is a low, spreading shrub with narrowly egg-shaped to narrowly ellipic leaves and erect clusters of white or pale yellow flowers surrounded by egg-shaped involucral bracts. It was previously included in Pimelea avonensis.

== Description ==
Pimelea neokyrea is a spreading shrub that typically grows to a height of 30–90 cm (12–35 in), its stems glabrous except for hair tufts below the flowers. The leaves are narrowly egg-shaped to narrowly elliptic, 12–23 mm (0.47–0.91 in) long, 2–6 mm (0.079–0.236 in) wide on a petiole 0.5–1 mm (0.020–0.039 in) long, with the edges of the leaves curved downwards. The flowers are arranged in erect clusters surrounded by egg-shaped involucral bracts that are yellowish to reddish near their bases. The sepals are about 3 mm (0.12 in) long, the floral tube 7–8 mm (0.28–0.31 in) long, the stamens shorter than the sepals. Flowering occurs from August to October.

== Taxonomy ==
Pimelea neokyrea was first formally described in 1999 by Barbara Lynette Rye and the description was published in the journal Nuytsia from specimens collected by Greg Keighery near Cranbrook in 1984. The specific epithet (neokyrea) means "recent light upon", referring to its previously incorrect placement in Pimelea avonensis.

== Distribution and habitat ==
This pimelea grows on hillslopes in mallee heath, often with jarrah (Eucalyptus marginata) in the Avon Wheatbelt and Jarrah Forest bioregions of south-western Western Australia.

== Conservation status ==
Pimelea neokyrea is listed as "Priority Two" by the Western Australian Government Department of Biodiversity, Conservation and Attractions, meaning that it is poorly known and from only one or a few locations.
