= Richard Greaves =

Richard Greaves may refer to:

- Richard L. Greaves (1938–2004), American historian
- Richard Methuen Greaves (1852–1942), Welsh landowner
- Richard Greaves (1853-1916), Australian gold prospector
