= Merredin railway station =

Railway station in Merredin, Western Australia

Merredin
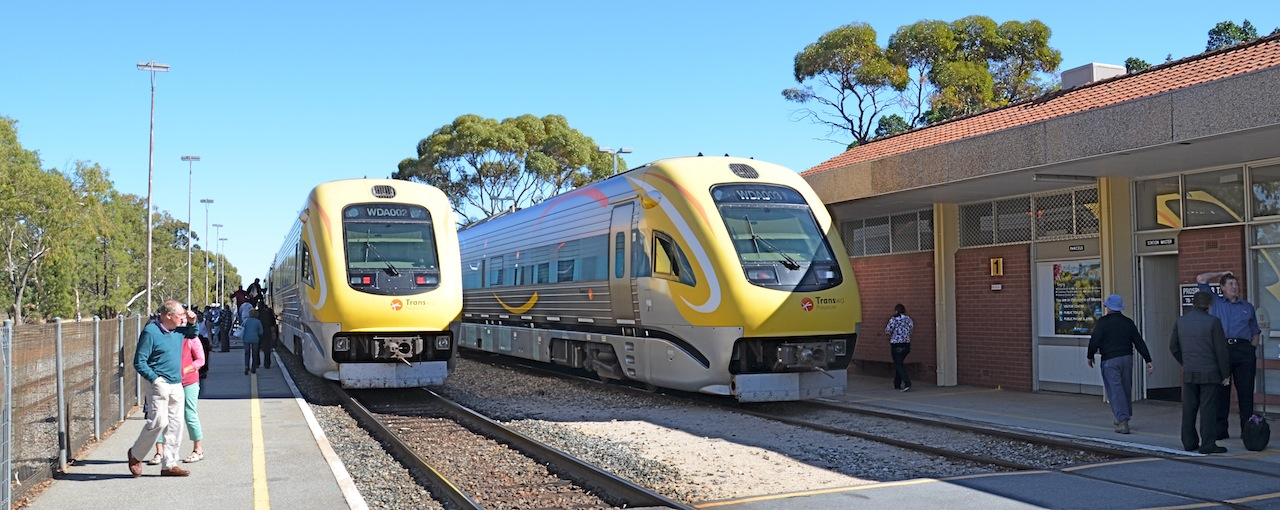
- Prospector trains cross at Merredin, April 2014

General information
- Location: Barrack Street, Merredin; Western Australia; Australia
- Coordinates: 31.482°S 118.279°E
- Owner: Public Transport Authority
- Operator: Transwa
- Line: Eastern Goldfields Railway
- Distance: 284.20 kilometres from Perth
- Platforms: 2 side
- Tracks: 3

Construction
- Structure type: Ground
- Accessible: Yes

Other information
- Status: Unstaffed

History
- Opened: 1895 (original)

Services
Preceding station	Transwa	Following station
Hines Hill towards East Perth	MerredinLink	Terminus
Hines Hill towards East Perth	Prospector	Burracoppin towards Kalgoorlie

Western Australia Heritage Register
- Official name: Merredin Railway Station Group
- Type: State Registered Place
- Designated: 26 February 1999
- Reference no.: 1577
Location

Merredin railway station is located on the Eastern Goldfields Railway in Western Australia. It is in the town of Merredin.

== History ==
The original Merredin station opened in 1895. It was an important station on the Eastern Goldfields Railway, being the junction station for a number of lines to locations in the Wheatbelt and Goldfields regions.

The main eastern railway connected with Northam to the west, and to Southern Cross to the east.

The narrow gauge lines that connected with Merredin were:

- Narrogin from the western end of the station, Bruce Rock to the south (then to Narrogin).
- from the north of the station area, Nungarin (to Wyalkatchem) to the north.
- from the east of the station area, Kondinin to the south (for a line to Narrogin).

When the main eastern railway line was converted to standard gauge in the late 1960s, a new station was built diagonally opposite.

The original station is used as a museum. Exhibits include a G class steam locomotive and TA class diesel locomotive.

In 2021–22, work began on constructing a second high-level platform to improve accessibility. Rail Express website reported that the high level platform was complete in October 2024.

== Marshalling yards ==
Due to the wheat silos, and the number of lines running into Merredin, the area to the west of the railway station was taken up with the marshalling yards.

However the Merredin railway yard had entailed lines adjacent to the railway station.

The importance of the Merredin marshalling yards and railway yard, was reduced as the feeder narrow gauge branch lines were closed over time. Merredin is still the location of a large grain silo complex.

== Passenger services ==
Transwa's MerredinLink and Prospector services stop at Merredin, at least one service each day.

The Indian Pacific also passes here, running once a week each way between East Perth and Sydney Central, but does not stop at the station.
