= Cryptandra minutifolia =

Scientific classification
- Kingdom: Plantae
- Clade: Tracheophytes
- Clade: Angiosperms
- Clade: Eudicots
- Clade: Rosids
- Order: Rosales
- Family: Rhamnaceae
- Genus: Cryptandra
- Species: C. minutifolia

Binomial name
- Cryptandra minutifolia Rye

Species of flowering plant

Cryptandra minutifolia is a flowering plant in the family Rhamnaceae and is endemic to the south-west of Western Australia. It is a spreading shrub with oblong to elliptic leaves and clusters of white or pink, tube-shaped flowers.

== Description ==
Cryptandra minutifolia is usually a spreading shrub that typically grows to a height of 20–70 cm (7.9–27.6 in), its branchlets not spiny, its young stems densely hairy at first. The leaves are oblong to elliptic or narrowly elliptic, 0.8–1.5 mm (0.031–0.059 in) long and 0.6–0.8 mm (0.024–0.031 in) wide, on a petiole 0.2–0.3 mm (0.0079–0.0118 in) long with stipules 0.8–2 mm (0.031–0.079 in) long at the base. The upper surface of the leaves is minutely pimply, the lower surface mostly concealed, and there is a downcurved point on the tip. The flowers are white or pink with 8 to 14 broadly egg-shaped floral bracts at the base. The floral tube is 1.5–3.5 mm (0.059–0.138 in) long, joined at the base for 0.5–0.7 mm (0.020–0.028 in) and densely covered with star-shaped hairs. The sepals are 1.5–3.7 mm (0.059–0.146 in) long and densely hairy, the style 0.7–3.6 mm (0.028–0.142 in) long. Flowering mainly occurs from June to September, and the fruit is a schizocarp.

== Taxonomy and naming ==
Cryptandra minutifolia was first formally described in 1995 by Barbara Lynette Rye in the journal Nuytsia from specimens collected near Mount Madden, south-east of Lake King in 1968. The specific epithet (minutifolia ) means "small-leaved", referring to the leaves being smaller than the flowers.

In the same journal, Rye described two subspecies of C. minutifolia, and the names are accepted by the Australian Plant Census:

- Cryptandra minutifolia subsp. brevistyla Rye has fewer, larger flowers, more floral bracts and longer floral tubes, styles and sepals than the autonym.
- Cryptandra minutifolia Rye subsp. minutifolia

== Distribution and habitat ==
This cryptandra usually grows on plains in mallee between Manmanning, Carrabin, Dumbleyung and the Ravensthorpe Range in the Avon Wheatbelt, Coolgardie Esperance Plains and Mallee bioregions of south-western Western Australia. Subspecies minutifolia has a more easterly distribution than subsp. brevistyla.

== Conservation status ==
Both subspecies of C. minutifolia are listed as "not threatened" by the Government of Western Australia Department of Biodiversity, Conservation and Attractions.
