= Cryptandra polyclada =

Scientific classification
- Kingdom: Plantae
- Clade: Tracheophytes
- Clade: Angiosperms
- Clade: Eudicots
- Clade: Rosids
- Order: Rosales
- Family: Rhamnaceae
- Genus: Cryptandra
- Species: C. polyclada

Binomial name
- Cryptandra polyclada Diels

Species of flowering plant

Cryptandra polyclada is a species of flowering plant in the family Rhamnaceae and is endemic to the southwest of Western Australia. It is a low, spreading to mat-forming or erect shrub with white or cream-coloured, tube-shaped flowers. It was first formally described in 1904 by Ludwig Diels in Botanische Jahrbücher für Systematik, Pflanzengeschichte und Pflanzengeographie from specimens collected near Tammin. The specific epithet (polyclada) means "many shoots".

In 1995, Barbara Lynette Rye described two subspecies of C. polyclada in the journal Nuytsia, and the names are accepted by the Australian Plant Census:

- Cryptandra polyclada subsp. aequabilis Rye is a low, dense, spreading shrub that typically grows to a height of 10–40 cm (3.9–15.7 in), has leaves 1.8–2.8 mm (0.071–0.110 in) long, white flowers, the floral tube about 1.0 mm (0.039 in) long densely covered with star-shaped hairs, and sepals 0.8 mm (0.031 in) long. Flowering occurs in October. This subspecies is only known from in or near Boorabbin National Park where it grows in sand in the Coolgardie bioregion of sourh-western Western Australia.
- Cryptandra polyclada Diels subsp. polyclada is a mat-forming, sometimes erect shrub that typically grows to a height of 10–70 cm (3.9–27.6 in), has leaves 2.1–4.1 mm (0.083–0.161 in) long, white or cream-coloured flowers, the floral tube 0.7–1.1 mm (0.028–0.043 in) long usually densely covered with star-shaped hairs, and sepals 0.6–1.1 mm (0.024–0.043 in) long. Flowering occurs from January to May. This subspecies occurs near Tammin and from near Hyden to east of Lake King in the Avon Wheatbelt, Coolgardie, Esperance Plains and Mallee bioregions.

Subspecies aequabilis is listed as "Priority One" by the Government of Western Australia Department of Biodiversity, Conservation and Attractions, meaning that it is known from only one or a few locations which are potentially at risk, and subsp. polyclada as "Priority Three", meaning that it is poorly known and known from only a few locations but is not under imminent threat.
