= Booraan, Western Australia =

Booraan
- Interactive map of Booraan
- Coordinates: 31°27′S 118°23′E
- Country: Australia
- State: Western Australia
- LGA: Shire of Merredin

Government
  - State electorate: Central Wheatbelt
  - Federal division: Durack

Booraan is a railway siding at the 297 km (185 mi) peg of the standard gauge Eastern Goldfields Railway between Northam and Kalgoorlie in Western Australia.

Geographically, Booraan is an unbounded locality within the Shire of Merredin, located between the towns of Merredin and Burracoppin.

It has been an identified rail accident location over time.

== Military history ==
During World War II Booraan was the location of the No. 9 Advanced Ammunition sub-depot developed in 1942 and manned by 16 Ordnance Ammunition Section. It was closed in 1945.
