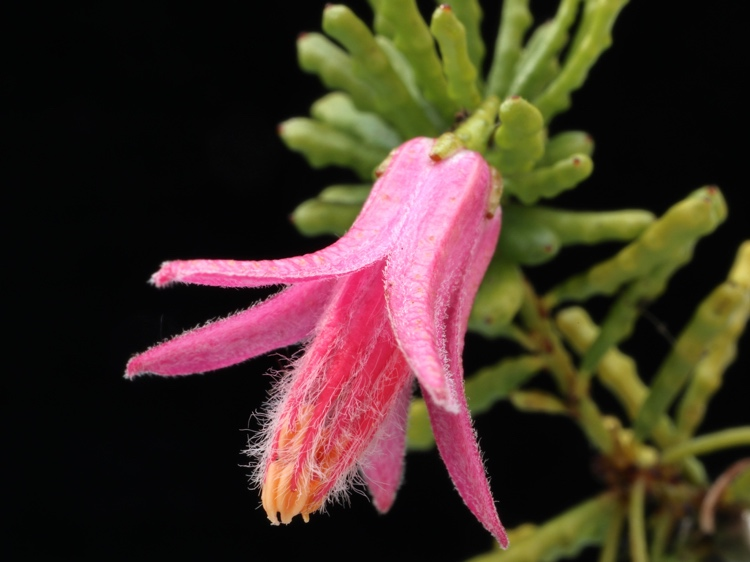

Scientific classification
- Kingdom: Plantae
- Clade: Embryophytes
- Clade: Tracheophytes
- Clade: Spermatophytes
- Clade: Angiosperms
- Clade: Eudicots
- Clade: Rosids
- Order: Sapindales
- Family: Rutaceae
- Genus: Philotheca
- Species: P. coccinea

Binomial name
- Philotheca coccinea (C.A.Gardner) Paul G.Wilson

Synonyms
- Eriostemon coccineus C.A.Gardner

= Philotheca coccinea =

Species of plant

Philotheca coccinea is a species of flowering plant in the family Rutaceae and is endemic to Western Australia. It is a shrub with club-shaped leaves that are warty on the lower surface, and red to pink flowers arranged singly in leaf axils.

== Description ==
Philotheca coccinea is an erect or spreading shrub that grows to a height of 0.3–1.5 m (1 ft 0 in – 4 ft 11 in) and has branchlets covered with warty glands. The leaves are clup-shaped, about 10 mm (0.39 in) long and 1.5 mm (0.059 in) wide, smooth on the upper surface but with prominent warty glands on the lower side. The flowers are borne singly in leaf axils on a drooping pedicel 6–8 mm (0.24–0.31 in) long. There are five fleshy, broadly egg-shaped sepals about 1.5 mm (0.059 in) long. The five petals are red to pink, rarely white, about 8 mm (0.31 in) long and joined in their lower half. The ten stamens are free from each other and densely woolly-hairy.

== Taxonomy and naming ==
This species was first formally described in 1939 by Charles Gardner who gave it the name Eriostemon coccineus. The description was published in Hooker's Icones Plantarum from specimens collected by William Blackall west of Coolgardie in 1931. In 1998 Paul G. Wilson changed the name to Philotheca coccinea in the journal Nuytsia.

== Distribution and habitat ==
Philotheca coccinea grows in shrubland on rocky ridges and hillsides and on undulating plains from Southern Cross to Norseman.

== Conservation status ==
This species is classified as "not threatened" by the Government of Western Australia Department of Parks and Wildlife.
