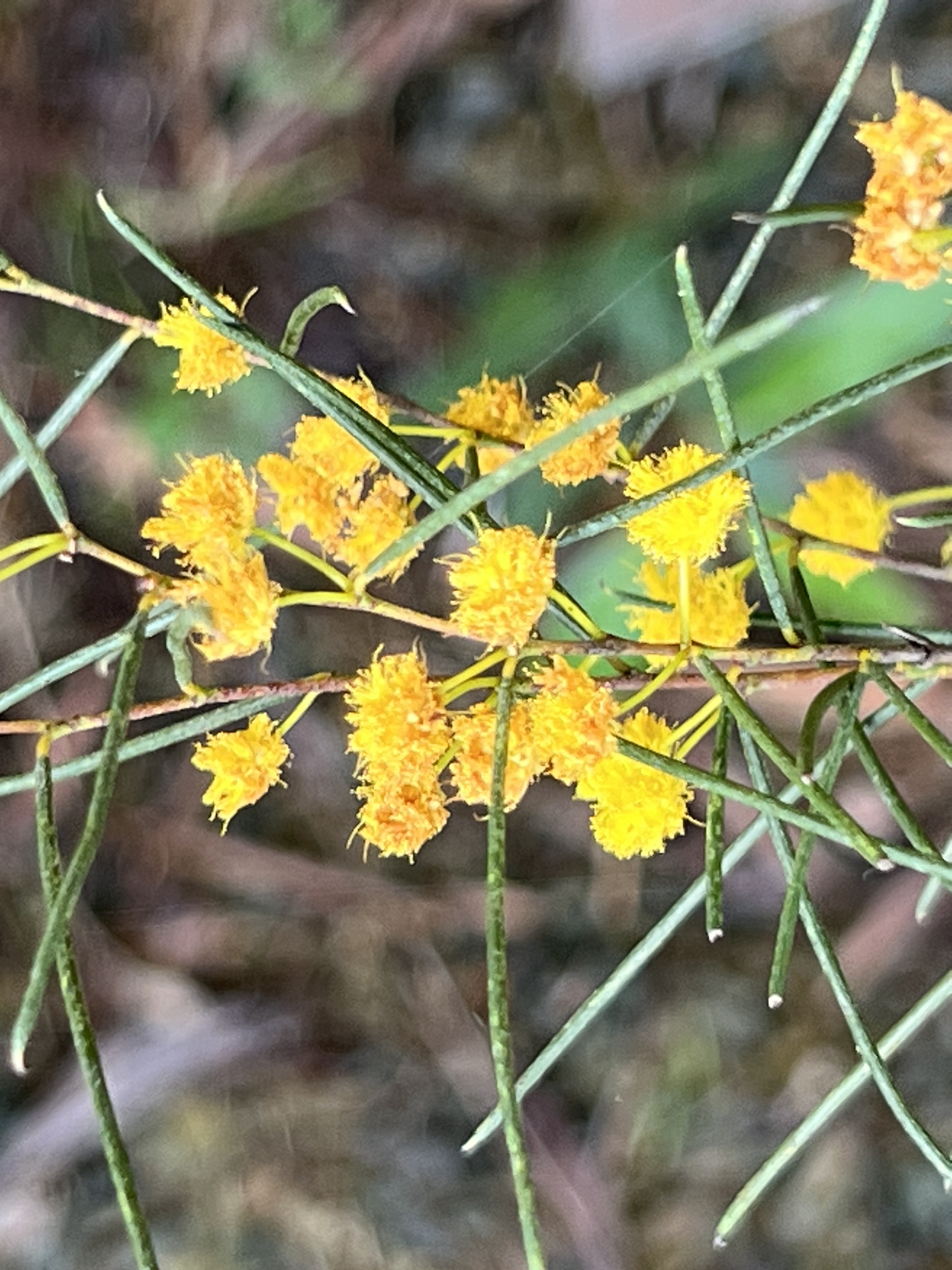
- in Maranoa Botanic Gardens

Scientific classification
- Kingdom: Plantae
- Clade: Embryophytes
- Clade: Tracheophytes
- Clade: Spermatophytes
- Clade: Angiosperms
- Clade: Eudicots
- Clade: Rosids
- Order: Fabales
- Family: Fabaceae
- Subfamily: Caesalpinioideae
- Clade: Mimosoid clade
- Genus: Acacia
- Species: A. uncinella

Binomial name
- Acacia uncinella Benth.
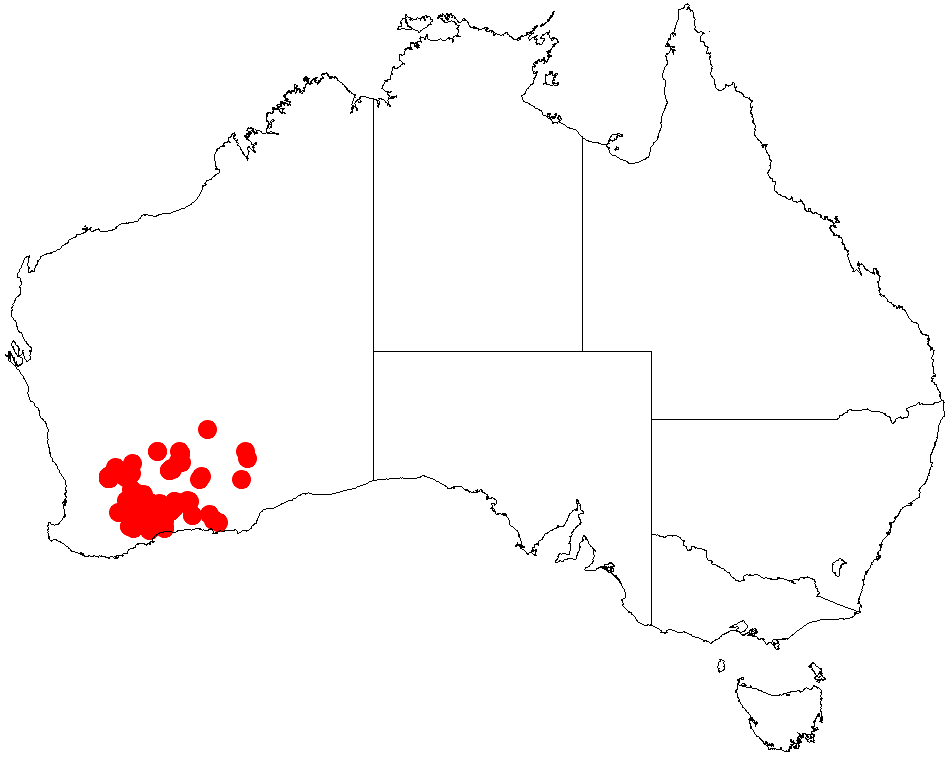
- Occurrence data from AVH

= Acacia uncinella =

Species of legume

Acacia uncinella is a shrub of the genus Acacia and the subgenus Plurinerves that is endemic to an area of south western Australia.

== Description ==
The rounded shrub typically grows to a height of 0.3 to 3 metres (1 to 10 ft) and has cylindrical, weakly angled and glabrous to hairy branchlets. Like most species of Acacia it has phyllodes rather than true leaves. The evergreen phyllodes are straight to slightly curved with a length of 1 to 3.5 cm (0.39 to 1.38 in) and have a diameter of 0.7 to 1.5 mm (0.028 to 0.059 in) and have eight distant raised to plane nerves. It blooms from August to October and produces yellow flowers. The simple inflorescences occur in pairs in the axils and have spherical flower-heads with a diameter of 2.8 to 4.5 mm (0.11 to 0.18 in) containing 16 to 30 golden coloured flowers. Glabrous and thinly crustaceous seed pods form after flowering that have a linear shape but are slightly raised over and constricted between each of the seeds. The pods have a length of about 4 to 5 cm (1.6 to 2.0 in) and a width of 2.5 to 3.5 mm (0.098 to 0.138 in) and contain subglossy mottled blackish coloured seeds that have an elliptic or oblong-elliptic shape and are 2.5 to 3.5 mm (0.098 to 0.138 in) in length and have a crested aril.

== Distribution ==
It is native to an area in the Wheatbelt and Goldfields-Esperance regions of Western Australia where it is commonly situated around salt flats and lakes, on slopes or sandplains growing in rocky loamy or sandy soils. It has a scattered distribution with the bulk of the population found from Ongerup in the west to around the Wittenoom Hills approximately 50 km (31 mi) north of Esperance to the east and up to around Hyden in the north. Other outlying populations are found around Merredin, Kellerberrin and Boorabbin National Park as well as to the south of Zanthus where it is often a part of Banksia and Casuarina scrubland and Eucalyptus scrub-woodland communities.

== See also ==
- List of Acacia species
