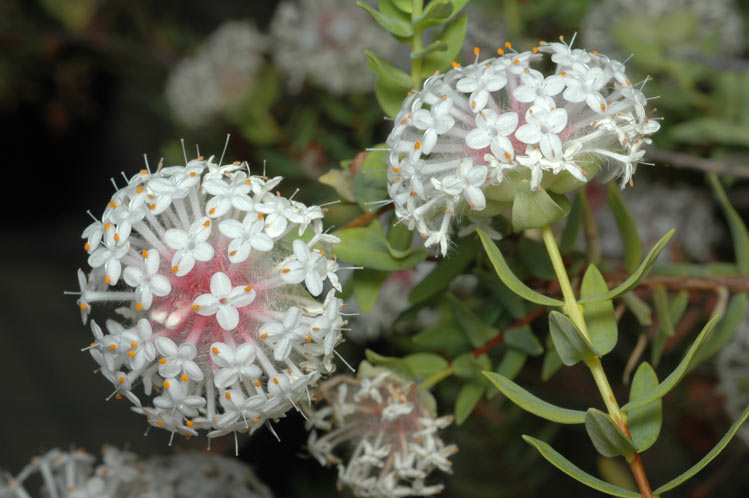
- In the Australian National Botanic Gardens

Scientific classification
- Kingdom: Plantae
- Clade: Tracheophytes
- Clade: Angiosperms
- Clade: Eudicots
- Clade: Rosids
- Order: Malvales
- Family: Thymelaeaceae
- Genus: Pimelea
- Species: P. avonensis

Binomial name
- Pimelea avonensis Rye

= Pimelea avonensis =

Species of shrub

Pimelea avonensis is a species of flowering plant in the family Thymelaeaceae and is endemic to the south-west of Western Australia. It is a shrub with narrowly egg-shaped or elliptic leaves and clusters of white, tube-shaped flowers.

== Description ==
Pimelea avonensis is a shrub that typically grows to a height of 0.4–1 m (1 ft 4 in – 3 ft 3 in) and is single-stemmed at ground level. The leaves are narrowly egg-shaped or linear, 5–24 mm (0.20–0.94 in) long, 0.5–3 mm (0.020–0.118 in) wide and more or less sessile with the edges curved downwards. The flowers are borne in erect clusters on a peduncle 2–22 mm (0.079–0.866 in) long with 4 or 6 involucral bracts at the base. Each flower is borne on a hairy pedicel about 1 mm (0.039 in) long and is white, often pink in the bud stage. The floral tube is 8–12 mm (0.31–0.47 in) long, the sepals egg-shaped, 2–4 mm (0.079–0.157 in) long and hairy. Flowering occurs from July to October.

== Taxonomy ==
Pimelea avonensis was first formally described in 1988 by Barbara Lynette Rye in the journal Nuytsia from specimens collected in the Wongan Hills in 1983. The specific epithet (avonensis) refers to the Avon Botanical District in which this species occurs.

== Distribution and habitat ==
This pimelea mainly grows on sandplains and breakaways, often in woodland and shrubland, mainly from Wilroy Nature Reserve near Mullewa, southeast to Moorine Rock in the Avon Wheatbelt, Coolgardie, Geraldton Sandplains and Yalgoo bioregions of south-western Western Australia.

== Conservation status ==
Pimelea avonensis is listed as "not threatened" by the Government of Western Australia Department of Biodiversity, Conservation and Attractions.
