= Eastern Goldfields Railway =

Railway line in Western Australia

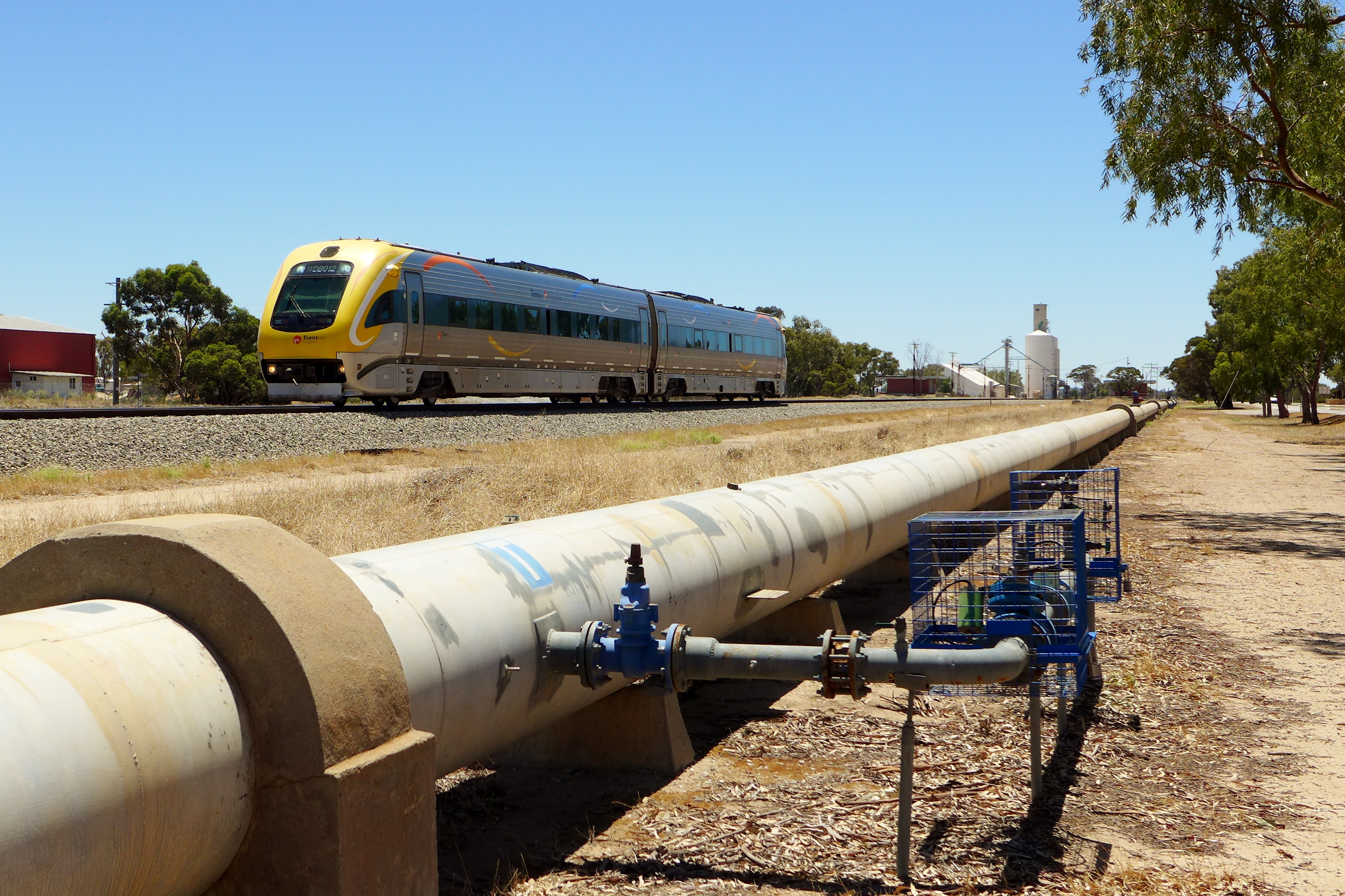
- The Prospector at Kellerberrin with the Goldfields water pipeline in the foreground & the CBH grain receival point in the background

Overview
- Owner: Public Transport Authority
- Termini: Northam; Kalgoorlie

Service
- Operator: Arc Infrastructure

History
- 1 July 1894: opened Northam to Southern Cross: 1 July 1896: opened Southern Cross to Boorabbin; 1 January 1897: opened Boorabbin to Kalgoorlie; February 1966: Bellevue to Northam added gauge and changed route 1968: Northam to Kalgoorlie, replaced narrow gauge with standard gauge and changed route

Technical
- Line length: 373 kilometres
- Track gauge: 1,435 mm (4 ft 8 1/2 in) standard gauge 1,067 mm (3 ft 6 in) dual gauge
- Old gauge: 3 ft 6 in (1,067 mm)

The Eastern Goldfields Railway was built in the 1890s by the Western Australian Government Railways to connect Perth with the Eastern Goldfields at Coolgardie and Kalgoorlie.

It is a part of the interstate standard gauge railway between Perth and the rest of Australia.

Originally, at construction, the railway line was referred to as the Yilgarn Railway, named after the Yilgarn Godlfields, but this was changed to Eastern Goldfields Railway around 1899 or 1900. It had also been referred to as the Fremantle–Kalgoorlie Railway. Operationally in the WAGR era, the line was considered to be between Northam and Kalgoorlie, despite historical material extending the name to Perth.

Operator Arc has Merredin as the location of the start of the EGR in their network operations.

== History ==
The Yilgarn Railway Act 1892, an act by the Parliament of Western Australia granted assent on 18 March 1892, authorised the construction of the railway line from Northam to Southern Cross. The Southern Cross-Coolgardie Railway Act 1894, assented to on 23 November 1894, authorised construction of a railway line from Southern Cross to Coolgardie. A third act, the Coolgardie–Kalgoorlie Railway Act 1895, assented to on 2 October 1895, authorised construction of a railway line from Coolgardie to Kalgoorlie.

The Eastern Railway opened in stages from Perth to Northam in the 1890s, and the Eastern Goldfields Railway extended this line through semi-desert to the Eastern Goldfields.

It opened in stages between 1894 and 1897.

- Northam to Southern Cross: 175 miles 14 chains (281.9 km) (opened 1 July 1894).
- Southern Cross to Boorabbin: 60 miles 55 chains (97.7 km) (opened 1 July 1896)
- Boorabbin to Kalgoorlie: 78 miles 14 chains (125.8 km) (opened 1 January 1897).

The Goldfields Water Supply Scheme pipeline was later constructed along the railway line. The chief engineer for both the railway and the pipeline was C. Y. O'Connor.

In October 1917, the Commonwealth Railways' standard gauge Trans-Australian Railway from Port Augusta was completed through to Kalgoorlie, making it a break-of-gauge station.

== Branches ==
At Kalgoorlie, lines branch off north to Malcolm and Leonora; and south to Esperance via the Esperance line. The Malcolm–Laverton branch was last used in 1957 and closed in 1960.

== Gauge conversion ==
As part of the Federal Government's program to build a standard gauge line across Australia and the passing of the Railways (Standard Gauge) Construction Act 1961, work commenced on gauge converting the line to dual gauge with a new alignment further north of the existing line built between Southern Cross and Kalgoorlie. From Northam to Southern Cross, the railway was also realigned to reduce the number of road crossings, increase the minimum radius of curvature and lower the ruling gradient to 1:150.

The new alignment, as well as being generally straighter and more favourably graded, provided access to the iron ore deposits at Koolyanobbing, which were shipped by rail to Kwinana, near Perth, to supply Australian Iron and Steel's blast furnace.

The first official standard gauge iron ore train from Koolyanobbing arrived at Kwinana on 10 July 1967. On 3 August 1968, the Koolyanobbing–Kalgoorlie section opened for freight trains and on 4 November 1968, the first through freight train from Port Pirie arrived in Perth.

== Upgrades ==
In November 2005, funding was announced to extend eight crossing loops to accommodate 1,800-metre-long (5,900 ft) trains at Bodallin, Darrine, Wallaroo, Lake Julia, Grass Valley, Bungulla, Booraan and Seabrook, and replace the final 76 kilometres (47 mi) of timber sleepers with concrete sleepers.

== Services ==
Transwa's MerredinLink and Prospector services from Perth to Merredin and Kalgoorlie traverse the line as does Journey Beyond's Indian Pacific to Sydney. Other named trains to previously use the line were The Westland and The Kalgoorlie.

Intrastate and interstate freight services are operated by Aurizon, Mineral Resources, Pacific National and SCT Logistics. CBH Group operate grain trains.
