= Southern Cross railway station, Western Australia =

Railway station in Western Australia

Southern Cross

General information
- Location: Three Boys Road, Southern Cross
- Coordinates: 31.230556°S 119.327778°E
- Owner: Transwa
- Operator: Transwa
- Line: Eastern Goldfields Railway
- Distance: 403.00 kilometres from Perth
- Platforms: 1
- Tracks: 2

Construction
- Structure type: Ground
- Accessible: Yes

Other information
- Status: Unstaffed

History
- Opened: 1 July 1894 (original)
- Closed: 1970s (original)
- Rebuilt: 1 May 1967 (current)

Services
Preceding station	Transwa	Following station
Moorine Rock towards East Perth	Prospector	Koolyanobbing towards Kalgoorlie
Location

Southern Cross railway station is located on the Eastern Goldfields Railway in Western Australia. It serves the town of Southern Cross.

== History ==
Southern Cross opened as the original terminus of Eastern Goldfields Railway on 1 July 1894. In 1896, the line was extended east to Coolgardie. It became a junction station when a line to Wyalkatchem opened. The immediate stations north were Corinthian, and Keane to the north, and Ghooli to the east. When a new standard gauge Eastern Goldfields Railway was built, it bypassed the town. The old narrow gauge line closed in the mid-1970s and the old station was closed and demolished. A new station opened on the standard gauge line on 1 May 1967. To the west of the station lies a yard to serve a grain silo.

== Services ==
The Prospector service, which runs each way between East Perth and Kalgoorlie once or twice each day, stops at Southern Cross.

The Indian Pacific also passes here, running once or twice a week (depending on the time of year) each way between East Perth and Sydney Central, but does not stop at the station.
