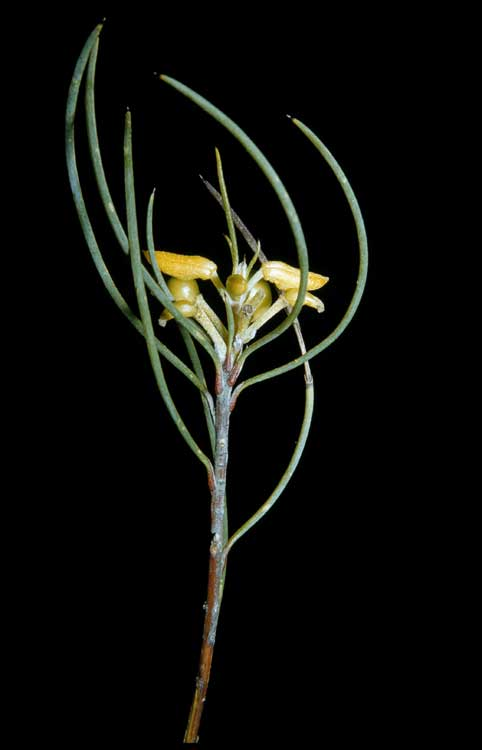

Scientific classification
- Kingdom: Plantae
- Clade: Tracheophytes
- Clade: Angiosperms
- Clade: Eudicots
- Order: Proteales
- Family: Proteaceae
- Genus: Persoonia
- Species: P. saundersiana

Binomial name
- Persoonia saundersiana Kippist

Synonyms
- Linkia diadena (F.Muell.) Kuntze; Linkia saundersiana (Meisn.) Kuntze; Persoonia diadena F.Muell.

= Persoonia saundersiana =

Species of flowering plant

Persoonia saundersiana is a species of flowering plant in the family Proteaceae and is endemic to the south-west of Western Australia. It is an erect, spreading shrub with hairy young branchlets, linear leaves, and bright yellow flowers borne in groups of up to twenty-five on a rachis up to 100 mm (3.9 in) that continues to grow after flowering.

== Description ==
Persoonia saundersiana is an erect to spreading shrub that typically grows to a height of 0.5–5 m (1 ft 8 in – 16 ft 5 in) with smooth bark apart from rough, peeling bark near the base, and young branchlets that are covered with greyish hair. The leaves are linear, 40–210 mm (1.6–8.3 in) long, 1–3.2 mm (0.039–0.126 in) wide and curved upwards. The flowers are arranged in groups of up to twenty-five along a rachis up to 100 mm (3.9 in) long that continues to grow after flowering, each flower on a hairy pedicel 3.5–20 mm (0.14–0.79 in) long with a leaf or a scale leaf at the base. The tepals are bright yellow, 9.5–14 mm (0.37–0.55 in) long, the side tepals prominently asymmetrical and the lower tepal sac-like. Flowering mostly occurs from September to November and the fruit is a smooth, elliptical drupe 7–11 mm (0.28–0.43 in) long and 5–7.5 mm (0.20–0.30 in) wide.

== Taxonomy ==
Persoonia saundersiana was first formally described in 1855 by Carl Meissner in Hooker's Journal of Botany and Kew Garden Miscellany from specimens collected by James Drummond.

== Distribution and habitat ==
This geebung grows in scrub and mallee heath in the area between Minnivale, Tammin, Lake Hope and Comet Vale in the Avon Wheatbelt, Coolgardie, Geraldton Sandplains, Mallee, Murchison and Yalgoo biogeographic regions in the south-west of Western Australia.

== Conservation status ==
Persoonia saundersiana is classified as "not threatened" by the Government of Western Australia Department of Parks and Wildlife.
