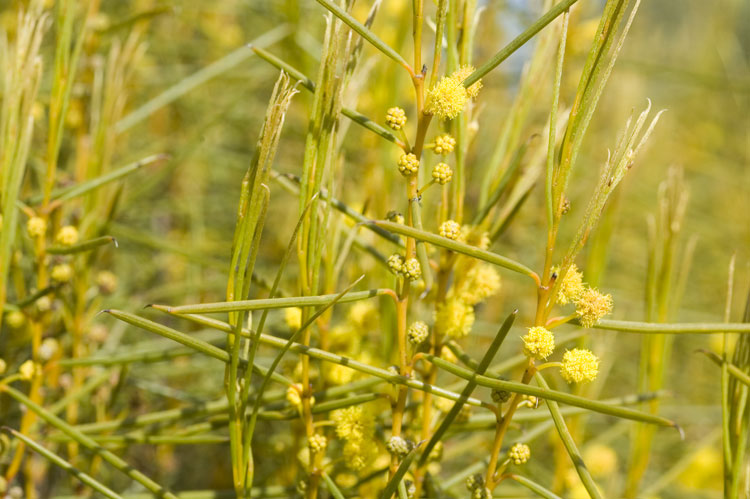

Scientific classification
- Kingdom: Plantae
- Clade: Tracheophytes
- Clade: Angiosperms
- Clade: Eudicots
- Clade: Rosids
- Order: Fabales
- Family: Fabaceae
- Subfamily: Caesalpinioideae
- Clade: Mimosoid clade
- Genus: Acacia
- Species: A. fragilis

Binomial name
- Acacia fragilis Maiden & Blakely
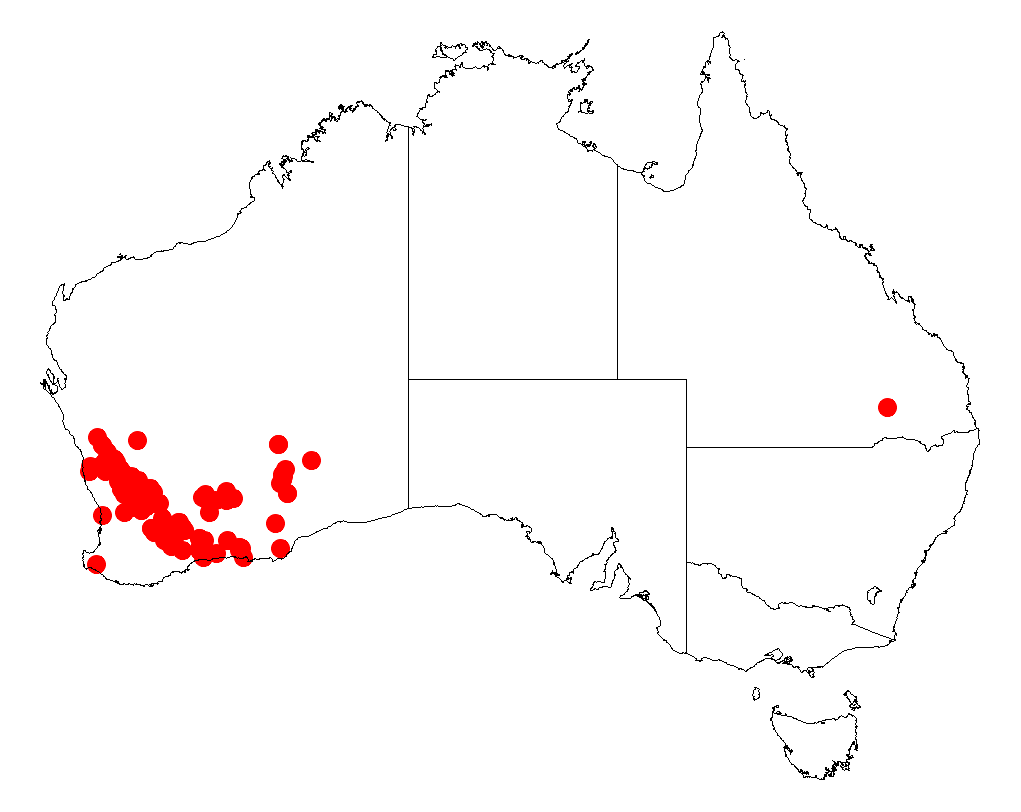
- Occurrence data from AVH

Synonyms
- Acacia triptycha var. tenuis Maiden; Racosperma fragile (Maiden & Blakely) Pedley

= Acacia fragilis =

Species of legume

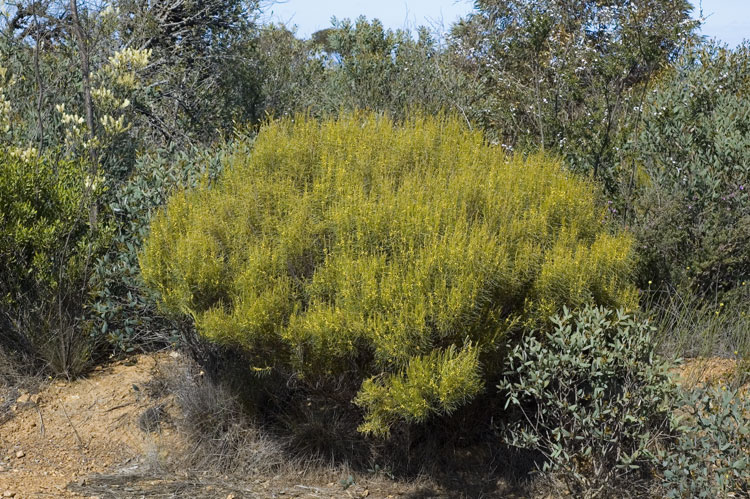
Habit near Ravensthorpe

Acacia fragilis is a species of flowering plant in the family Fabaceae and is endemic to the south-west of Western Australia. It is a dense, rounded or openly branched shrub with glabrous, terete branchlets, more or less terete phyllodes, spherical heads of golden yellow flowers and linear, thinly crust-like pods slightly constricted between the seeds.

== Description ==
Acacia fragilis dense, rounded or openly branched shrub typically that typically grows to a height of 0.5–3 m (1 ft 8 in – 9 ft 10 in) and has new shoots covered with golden, silky hairs. Its branchlets are terete and glabrous. Its phyllodes are terete to subterete, straight to shallowly curved, 35–70 mm (1.4–2.8 in) long and 1.0–1.3 mm (0.039–0.051 in) wide and mostly glabrous with eight raised veins. The flowers are borne in two spherical heads in axils on peduncles 4–5.5 mm (0.16–0.22 in) long, each head 4.0–4.5 mm (0.16–0.18 in) in diameter with 23 to 31 golden yellow flowers. Flowering mainly occurs from August to October, and the pods are linear, thinly crust-like, 50–70 mm (2.0–2.8 in) long, 2–3 mm (0.079–0.118 in) wide, raised on alternating sides over, and slightly constricted between the seeds. The seeds are elliptic, 2.5–3.0 mm (0.098–0.118 in) long and dull brown, with an aril near the end.

== Taxonomy ==
Acacia fragilis was first formally described in 1927 by the botanists Joseph Maiden and William Blakely in the Journal of the Royal Society of Western Australia. The specific epithet (fragilis) means 'brittle' or 'fragile', referring to the phyllodes which are brittle when dry.

== Distribution and habitat ==
This species of wattle is native to an area near Carnamah and south-south-east to the Cunderdin-Merredin area, with a few occurrence near Holt Rock, Boondi and near Ponton Creek 20.5 km (12.7 mi) east of Zanthus in the Avon Wheatbelt, Coolgardie, Esperance Plains, Geraldton Sandplains, Great Victoria Desert, Jarrah Forest, Mallee and Yalgoo bioregions, mostly in the southwest of Western Australia. It grows in sand, gravelly or clayey sand or loam in heath and on sandplains with mallee eucalypts and wattles.

== Conservation status ==
Acacia fragilis is listed as "not threatened" by the Western Australian Government Biodiversity Conservation Act 2016.

== See also ==
- List of Acacia species
