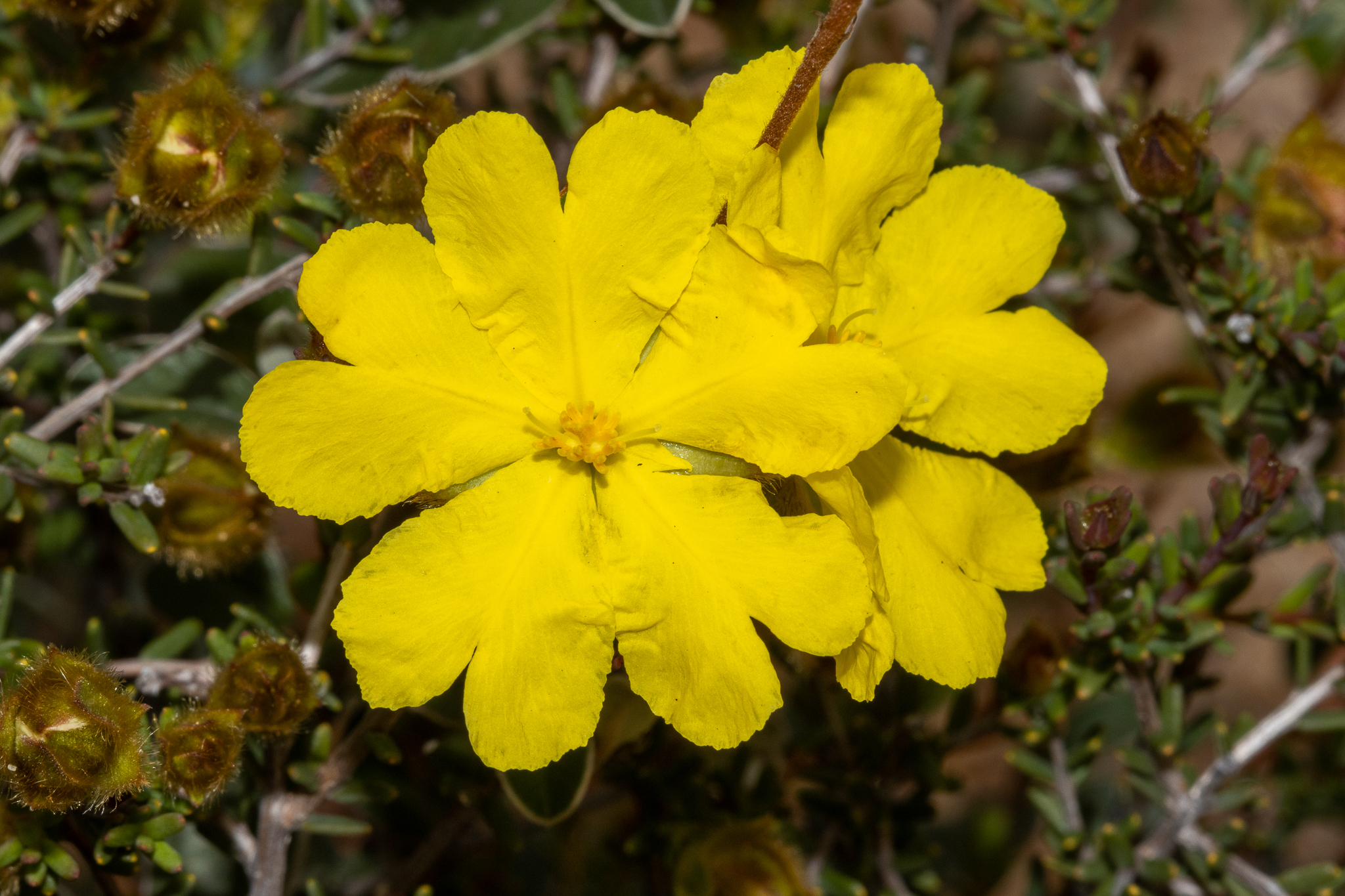

Scientific classification
- Kingdom: Plantae
- Clade: Tracheophytes
- Clade: Angiosperms
- Clade: Eudicots
- Order: Dilleniales
- Family: Dilleniaceae
- Genus: Hibbertia
- Species: H. drummondii

Binomial name
- Hibbertia drummondii (Turcz.) Gilg

Synonyms
- Hibbertia ochrolasia Benth. nom. illeg., nom. superfl.; Ochrolasia drummondi Benth. orth. var.; Ochrolasia drummondii Turcz.

= Hibbertia drummondii =

Species of flowering plant

Hibbertia drummondii is a shrub in the family Dilleniaceae family and is endemic to Western Australia. It is an erect shrub that typically grows to a height of 0.3–1 m (1 ft 0 in – 3 ft 3 in). It flowers from September to October and produces yellow flowers. The species was first described in 1849 by Nikolai Turczaninow in the Bulletin de la Société Impériale des Naturalistes de Moscou and given the name Ochrolasia drummondii. In 1893, Ernest Friedrich Gilg changed the name to Hibbertia drummondii in Die Natürlichen Pflanzenfamilien. The specific epithet (drummondii) honours James Drummond.

== See also ==
- List of Hibbertia species
