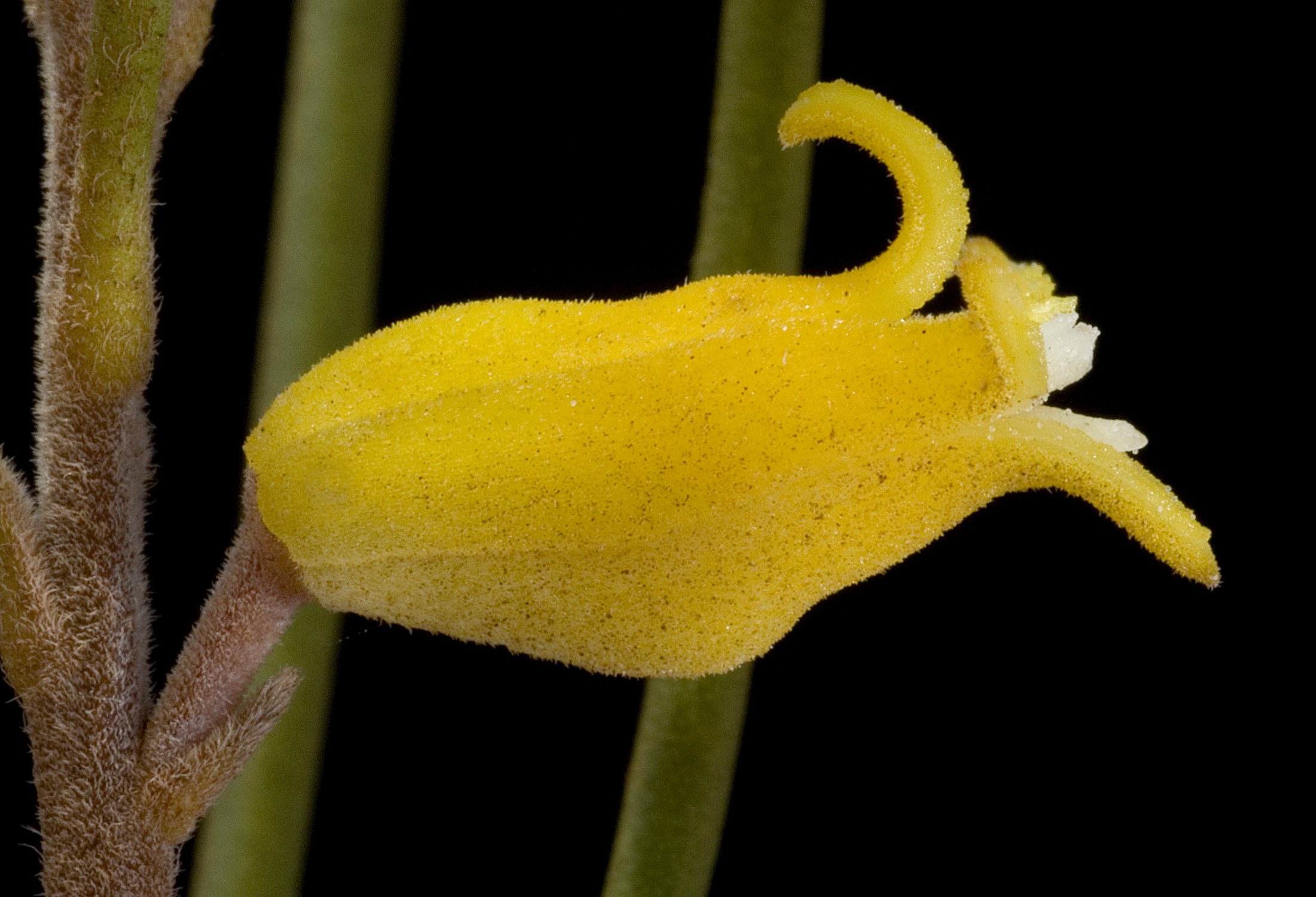

Scientific classification
- Kingdom: Plantae
- Clade: Tracheophytes
- Clade: Angiosperms
- Clade: Eudicots
- Order: Proteales
- Family: Proteaceae
- Genus: Persoonia
- Species: P. teretifolia

Binomial name
- Persoonia teretifolia R.Br.

Synonyms
- Linkia teretifolia (R.Br.) Kuntze; Persoonia scoparia Meisn. nom. inval., nom. nud.; Persoonia scoparia Meisn.; Persoonia teretifolia R.Br. var. teretifolia; Pycnonia teretifolia (R.Br.) L.A.S.Johnson & B.G.Briggs

= Persoonia teretifolia =

Species of flowering plant

Persoonia teretifolia is a species of flowering plant in the family Proteaceae and is endemic to the south-west of Western Australia. It is an erect, spreading shrub with smooth bark, hairy young branchlets, linear leaves, and bright yellow flowers borne in groups of up to twenty on a rachis up to 100 mm (3.9 in) long that continues to grow after flowering.

== Description ==
Persoonia teretifolia is an erect, often spreading shrub that typically grows to a height of 0.5–3 m (1 ft 8 in – 9 ft 10 in) with smooth bark and branches covered with greyish hairs when young. The leaves are linear, 15–70 mm (0.59–2.76 in) long, 0.9–1.5 mm (0.035–0.059 in) wide and curved upwards. The flowers are arranged in groups of up to twenty on a rachis up to 100 mm (3.9 in) long that continues to grow after flowering, each flower on a pedicel 2–6 mm (0.079–0.236 in) long with a leaf or a scale leaf at its base. The tepals are bright yellow, 9–13 mm (0.35–0.51 in) long with the side tepals asymmetrical and the lower tepal sac-like. Flowering mostly occurs from October to February.

== Taxonomy ==
Persoonia teretifolia was first formally described in 1810 by Robert Brown in the Transactions of the Linnean Society of London.

== Distribution and habitat ==
This geebung grows in heath, mostly in near-coastal areas between Israelite Bay and Albany in the Esperance Plains, Jarrah Forest and Mallee biogeographic regions in the south-west of Western Australia.

== Conservation status ==
Persoonia teretifolia is classified as "not threatened" by the Government of Western Australia Department of Parks and Wildlife.
