= Prospector =

Prospector may refer to:

== Space exploration ==
- Prospector (spacecraft), a planned lunar probe, canceled in 1962
- Lunar Prospector, a NASA spacecraft

== Trains ==
- Prospector (Denver and Rio Grande Western Railroad train), a former passenger train operated by the Denver & Rio Grande Western railroad between Denver and Salt Lake City
- Prospector (Western Australian train), a passenger train service in Western Australia between Perth and Kalgoorlie

== Other uses ==
- Prospector (library catalog), a unified catalog for Colorado and Wyoming
- Prospecting, exploring an area for natural resources such as minerals, oil, flora or fauna
- Prospectors (TV series), a weekly reality television series that premiered in 2013 on The Weather Channel
- The Prospector, a statue outside the Sitka Pioneer Home in Sitka, Alaska, United States
- The Prospector (novel), a 1985 novel by J. M. G. Le Clézio
- "The Prospector", nickname of American archer Brady Ellison
- The Prospector, student newspaper at the University of Texas at El Paso
