= Richard Greaves (prospector) =

Gold explorer and prospector in Western Australia

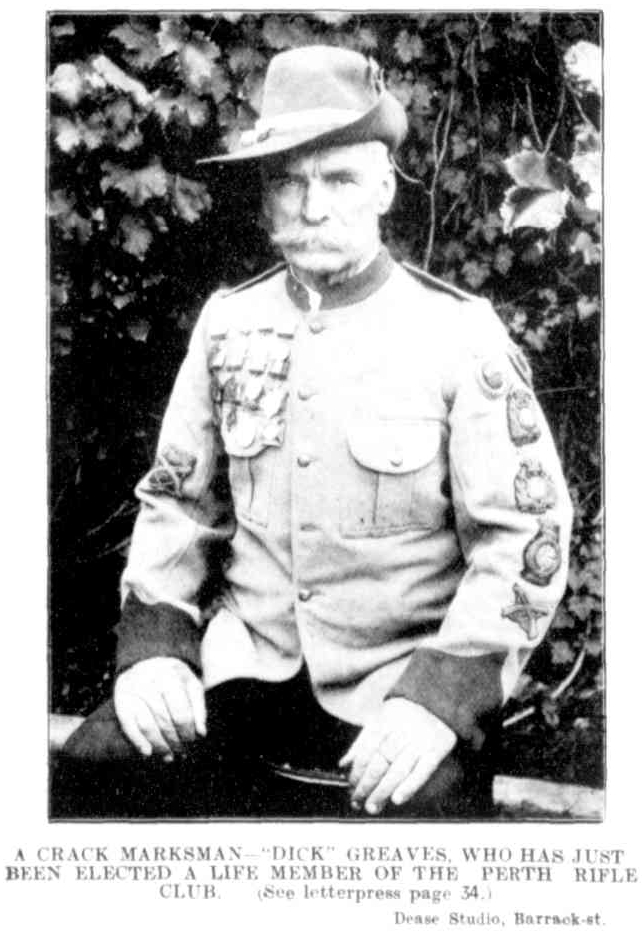
Richard Greaves at the time of receiving his life membership to the Perth Rifle Club

Richard Tuckey Greaves, better known as Dick Greaves, was a prospector and an expert marksman with a rifle.

== Biography ==
Greaves was born near Flinders Street, Melbourne, on the banks of the Yarra River in the colony of Victoria in 1852 or 1853. As a child he lived on the Victorian Goldfields, where his father was a prospector.

After the death of both his parents Greaves settled in the Williamstown area, where in 1866 he joined the Williamstown Volunteer Artillery. In 1873 he joined the Victorian Permanent Artillery, one of the first paid forces in the colony. Greaves stayed with them for about two years. They spent every day drilling and marching; on parade they were renowned for their precision and skill. However rifle shooting was never practised, and during this time Greaves did not once fire a rifle. He joined the Victoria Police, where his commanding presence and physical attributes made him an ideal recruit, but here again his interest in rifle shooting was not nurtured.

He moved to New South Wales and joined the New South Wales Artillery unit, where he was encouraged by his officers to regularly shoot rifles; he was a leading marksman representing NSW in many interstate competitions. Greaves rose to the rank of sergeant and was assigned as the recruitment officer for the No 1 Battery of the Volunteer Artillery; this battery was set to embark to the Sudan. Just before the battery sailed his wife objected to the separation, so he left the artillery.

In 1885 he moved to Western Australia, and began prospecting for gold, funded by £600 that he had brought with him.

Greaves competed on over 50 different rifle ranges across Australia, representing Victoria, NSW, and later Western Australia, and collected over 300 prizes as a marksman. Greaves founded the Perth Rifle Club and was later recognised for his efforts with life membership.

Due to ill-health caused by mining, Greaves became the caretaker of James Street State School. He died in the caretaker's quarters at the James Street school on 17 March 1916 and was buried at Karrakatta Cemetery in grave Baptist AA 160A.

== Prospecting ==
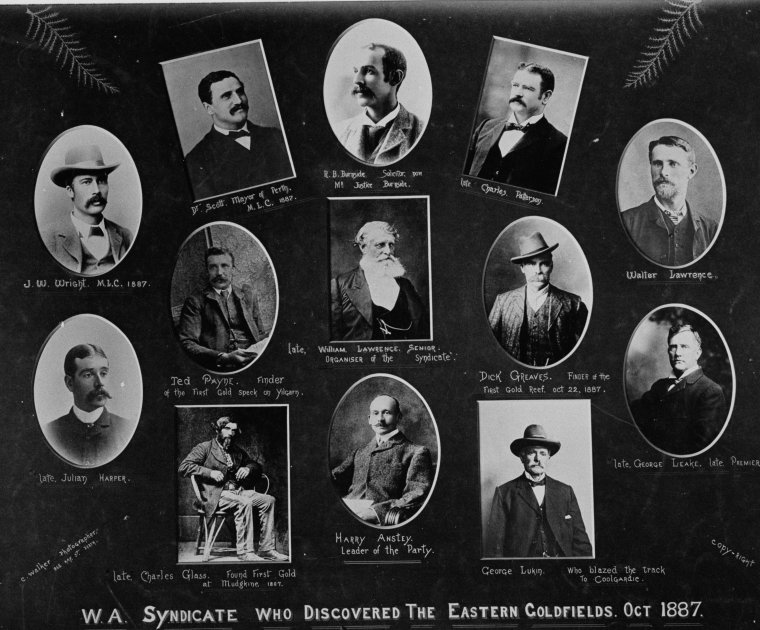
The syndicate that participated in the successful 1887 expedition

Just after arriving in Perth Greaves was shown a rock owned by William Lawrence, who thought it was copper. Due to his experience Greaves identified it as gold. Lawrence gave Greaves approximately 1 pound (0.45 kg) of the rock, from which he extracted 6 ounces (170 g) of gold, which he sold for £4 per ounce. This started Greaves on his search for gold in Western Australia, though it was some years before he was successful.

Greaves and Ted Payne found gold in the Yilgarn region of Western Australia in 1887, starting the first of the major gold rushes in Western Australia.

Greaves struggled to be rewarded for his involvement in the discovery of gold. As leader of the party, Harry Anstey collected a £500 reward for the discovery. Lawrence, on behalf of the syndicate, through the courts was able to recover £50 from Anstey for the expense in funding the expedition, while Greaves was given £5. It has never been established what Anstey did with the remaining £445. In 1906 a petition was presented for the Government of Western Australia to pay Greaves an annuity of £100.

In 1906 Greaves published a book called The Golden West, which detailed the experiences of prospecting for gold and the people who were there. In it he noted that Anstey was rewarded for finding gold by the Western Australian Colonial Government, and would never had found anything without the support of Payne and himself.
