= Boorabbin National Park =

National park in Western Australia

- IUCN category II (national park)
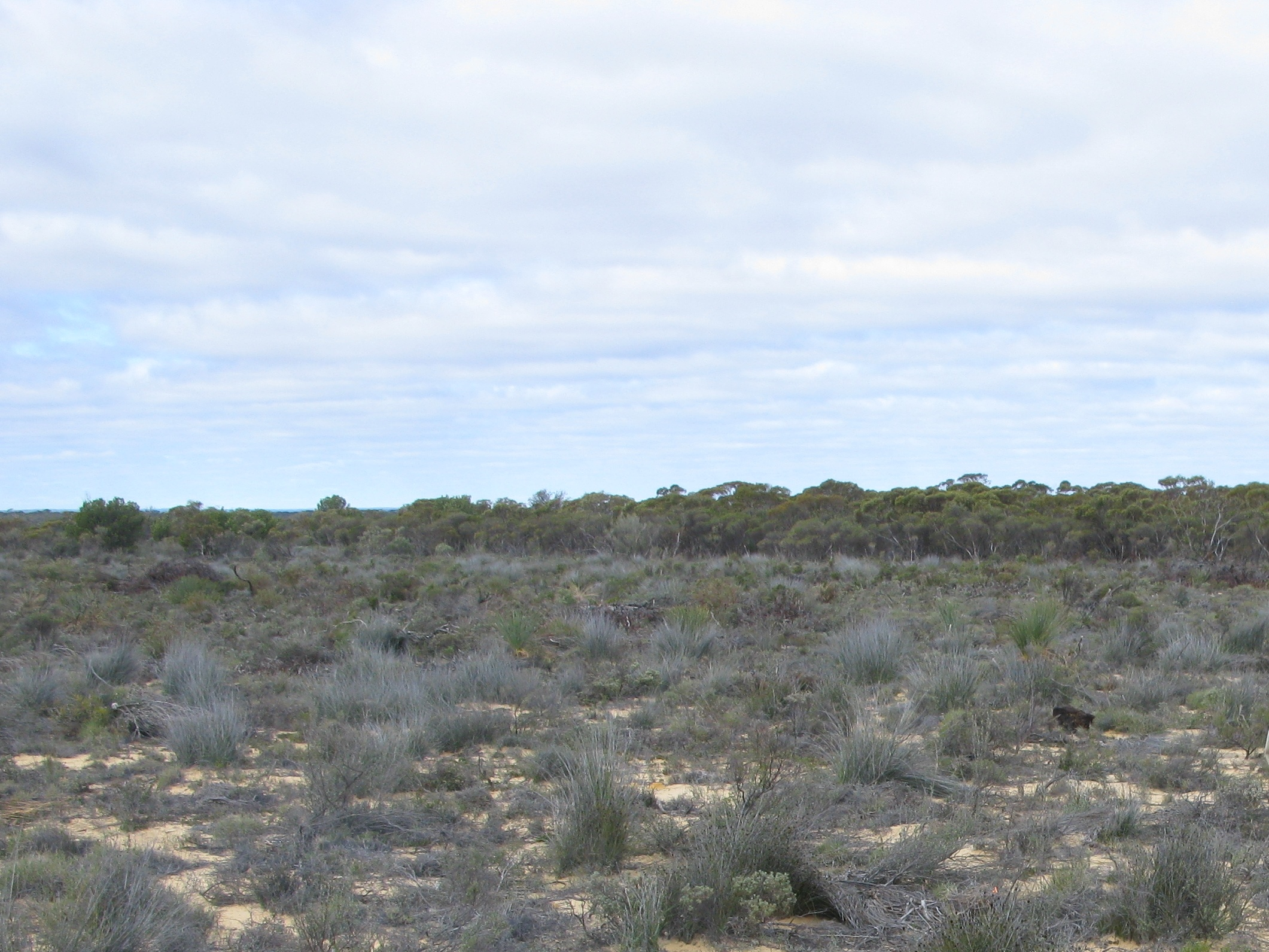

- Location within Western Australia
- Location: Western Australia
- Nearest city: Coolgardie
- Coordinates: 31°14′18″S 120°10′09″E
- Area: 281.53 km^{2} (108.70 sq mi)
- Established: 1977
- Governing body: Department of Environment and Conservation

Boorabbin National Park is a national park in Western Australia, between Coolgardie and Southern Cross. It is located along the Great Eastern Highway for a distance of approximately 25 km with a width of 5 km on each side in Western Australia's eastern goldfields. The park gets its name from the Aboriginal named rock on the edge of the park and also the Boorabbin settlement, established in 1898.

The Boorabbin National Park is situated on top of a plateau. The landscape is primarily sand and the vegetation there is quite distinctive growing in deep sands deposited over 50 million years ago. Today the erosion of this significant landscape is lessening, but as a result of past degradation, the sands are left very weathered, leached and lacking in nutrients.

Despite this, the vegetation is diverse with countless species thriving in this environment. Vegetation ranges from the rich kwongan heaths, woodlands and mallee shrublands. The area is recognised for its unique variety of vegetation, with its own designated plateau vegetation system. Other attributes that the park is known for are the wildflowers, samphire and salt lakes.

Other vegetation that can be found include species of banksia, acacia, hakea, sandalwood, melaleuca and grasstree. Two restricted species found in the heathland are Philotheca pachyphylla and Philotheca coccinea.

Fauna surveys in the park indicate that 17 native mammal species, including the wongai ningaui, dunnarts and bush rats, are found within the park boundaries. Other animals including 4 frog species, 52 species of reptile and 51 bird species are also resident in the park. The park is also home to a rich array of dragon lizards.

A bushfire in the park killed three men after a roadblock was lifted on Great Eastern Highway in Coolgardie in December 2007 after a long queue of vehicles were waiting for the highway to open after being closed for most of the day. The three truck drivers tried to turn around and flee the fire but could not escape and died from smoke burns. The bushfire continued to burn for two weeks before being extinguished by fire fighters, and authorities then had the highway reopened. An inquiry into the fire was commenced in 2008; the coroner found that extreme incompetence by the Department of Environment and Conservation had contributed toward the deaths. The fire burnt out an area of more than 7,500 hectares (18,533 acres) of the National Park and unallocated crown land. The fire jumped containment lines onto the southern side of Great Eastern Highway.

A memorial garden and shelter was opened near the old town site in 2010 for those who died in the 2007 bushfire.

== See also ==
- Protected areas of Western Australia
