= Carrabin, Western Australia =

Carrabin
- Town
- Interactive map of Carrabin
- Coordinates: 31°23′00″S 118°41′00″E
- Country: Australia
- State: Western Australia
- LGA: Shire of Westonia
- Location: 299 km (186 mi) ENE of Perth; 43 km (27 mi) ENE of Merredin
- Established: 1912

Government
  - State electorate: Central Wheatbelt
  - Federal division: O'Connor

Area
  - Total: 157.1 km^{2} (60.7 sq mi)
- Elevation: 359 m (1,178 ft)

Population
  - Total: 0 (SAL 2021)
- Postcode: 6423

Carrabin is a small town located about 43 kilometres (27 mi) east-north-east of Merredin, on the railway line between Merredin and Southern Cross in Western Australia.

== History ==
The town was gazetted in 1912, and took its name from the already existing railway siding located adjacent to the townsite. It is an Aboriginal name of unknown meaning.

In 1932 the Wheat Pool of Western Australia announced that the town would have two grain elevators, each fitted with an engine, installed at the railway siding.

It also is the site of an agricultural research station.

== Rail services ==
Transwa's Prospector service, which runs each way between East Perth and Kalgoorlie once or twice each day, stops at Carrabin.
