= Southern Cross, Western Australia =

Southern Cross
- Town
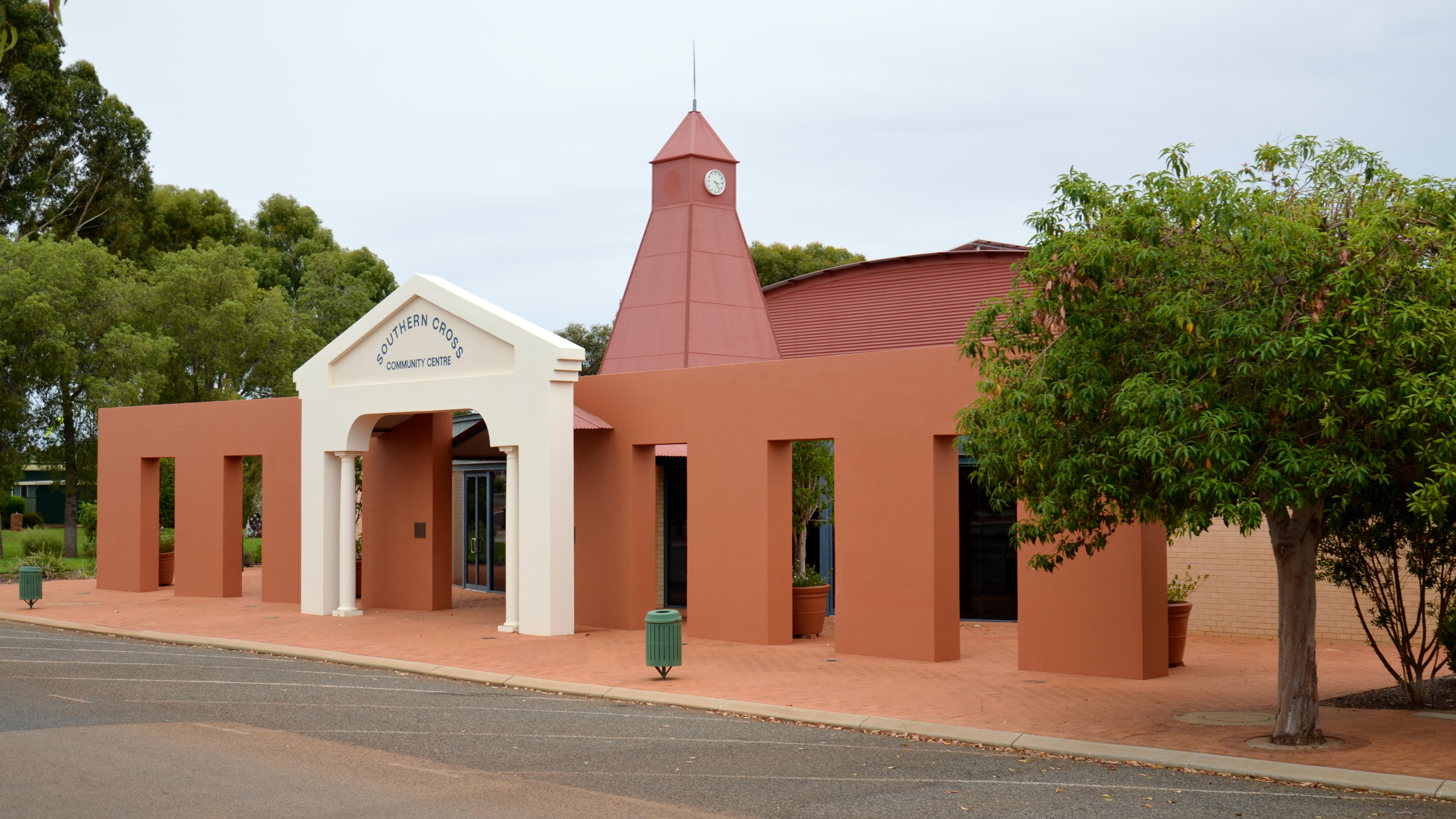
- Southern Cross Community Centre

- Interactive map of Southern Cross
- Coordinates: 31°13′50″S 119°19′40″E
- Country: Australia
- State: Western Australia
- LGA: Shire of Yilgarn
- Location: 371 km (231 mi) E of Perth; 225 km (140 mi) W of Kalgoorlie; 110 km (68 mi) E of Merredin
- Established: 1890

Government
  - State electorate: Central Wheatbelt
  - Federal division: O'Connor

Area
  - Total: 555.2 km^{2} (214.4 sq mi)
- Elevation: 355 m (1,165 ft)

Population
  - Total: 523 (UCL 2021)
- Postcode: 6426
- Mean max temp: 25.5 °C (77.9 °F)
- Mean min temp: 10.7 °C (51.3 °F)
- Annual rainfall: 294.9 mm (11.61 in)

Southern Cross is a town in Western Australia, 371 kilometres (230.5 miles) east of state capital Perth on the Great Eastern Highway. It was founded in 1888 after gold prospectors Richard Greaves and Ted Paine during their October 1887 expedition successfully found gold, and gazetted in 1890. It is the major town and administrative centre of the Shire of Yilgarn. At the 2016 census, Southern Cross had a population of 680.

The town of Southern Cross is one of the many towns that run along the Goldfields Water Supply Scheme pipeline from Mundaring to Kalgoorlie, engineered by C. Y. O'Connor, and as a consequence is an important location on the Golden Pipeline Heritage Trail.

A succession of gold rushes in the Yilgarn region near Southern Cross in 1887, at Coolgardie in 1892, and at Kalgoorlie in 1893 caused a population explosion in the barren and dry desert centre of Western Australia.

It is named after the Southern Cross constellation, and the town's streets are named after constellations and stars.

The surrounding areas produce wheat and other cereal crops. The town is a receival site for Cooperative Bulk Handling.

Southern Cross is in the Federal electorate of O'Connor.

== Climate ==
Climate data for Southern Cross Airfield (1996-2023)
Month	Jan	Feb	Mar	Apr	May	Jun	Jul	Aug	Sep	Oct	Nov	Dec	Year
Record high °C (°F)	46.3 (115.3)	46.7 (116.1)	42.6 (108.7)	39.0 (102.2)	34.0 (93.2)	28.6 (83.5)	26.0 (78.8)	31.3 (88.3)	36.8 (98.2)	40.3 (104.5)	44.6 (112.3)	45.7 (114.3)	46.7 (116.1)
Mean daily maximum °C (°F)	34.8 (94.6)	34.0 (93.2)	30.6 (87.1)	26.2 (79.2)	21.4 (70.5)	17.9 (64.2)	16.8 (62.2)	18.6 (65.5)	22.0 (71.6)	26.6 (79.9)	30.0 (86.0)	33.1 (91.6)	26.0 (78.8)
Mean daily minimum °C (°F)	17.9 (64.2)	17.9 (64.2)	15.5 (59.9)	11.8 (53.2)	7.3 (45.1)	4.6 (40.3)	3.7 (38.7)	4.0 (39.2)	5.7 (42.3)	9.5 (49.1)	13.2 (55.8)	15.8 (60.4)	10.6 (51.0)
Record low °C (°F)	8.5 (47.3)	7.5 (45.5)	1.8 (35.2)	1.4 (34.5)	−3.4 (25.9)	−5.0 (23.0)	−4.8 (23.4)	−3.8 (25.2)	−3.2 (26.2)	−1.7 (28.9)	0.7 (33.3)	5.8 (42.4)	−5.0 (23.0)
Average precipitation mm (inches)	27.5 (1.08)	26.2 (1.03)	34.5 (1.36)	23.6 (0.93)	27.1 (1.07)	26.7 (1.05)	34.1 (1.34)	31.8 (1.25)	19.7 (0.78)	17.8 (0.70)	17.3 (0.68)	13.9 (0.55)	300.2 (11.82)
Average rainy days (≥ 1 mm)	2.4	2.5	3.3	3	4.1	5.1	6.5	5.6	4	2.9	2.8	2.1	44.3
Average afternoon relative humidity (%) (at 3 pm)	33.2	32.3	29.2	25	20.6	16.9	15.6	17.2	20.1	24.8	31	24.5	24.2
Average dew point °C (°F)	5.8 (42.4)	8.0 (46.4)	7.1 (44.8)	7.3 (45.1)	6.6 (43.9)	5.1 (41.2)	4.9 (40.8)	4.1 (39.4)	3.9 (39.0)	2.4 (36.3)	2.5 (36.5)	5.1 (41.2)	5.2 (41.4)
Source: (humidity and dew point at 3pm 1996-2010)

== Railway ==
=== Narrow gauge route ===
The former narrow gauge route of the Eastern Goldfields Railway reached Southern Cross on 1 July 1894, and the Southern Cross to Coolgardie narrow gauge railway (via Boorabbin) was closed 29 November 1971.

The Wyalkatchem to Southern Cross railway line, initially to Bullfinch from 1911, was opened in its full length in 1929. In 1933, the Southern Cross Southwards Railway Act 1933 authorised the construction of 45 kilometres (28 mi) of railway line south of Southern Cross, which would have taken the railway into the area of Marvel Loch, which was surveyed but not constructed.

In 1932 the Wheat Pool of Western Australia announced that the town would have two grain elevators, each fitted with an engine, installed at the railway siding.

The Railways (Cue-Big Bell and other Railways) Discontinuance Act 1960, assented to on 12 December 1960, authorised the official closure of 13 railway lines in Western Australia, among them the Southern Cross to Mukinbudin section of the railway to Wyalkatchem.

=== Standard gauge route ===
Southern Cross railway station is on the standard gauge railway from Perth to Kalgoorlie. The construction and opening of the line from Perth was completed on 1 May 1967, and the connection to Kalgoorlie via Koolyanobbing was completed by 4 November 1968. Transwa's Prospector services the town.

== See also ==
- Goldfields-Esperance
- Helena River
- John Forrest
- Mundaring Weir
- Cody Fern
