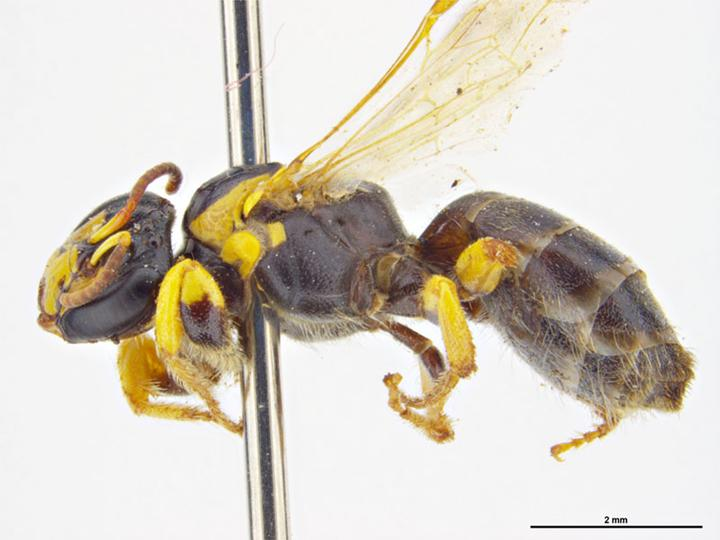
- Female

Scientific classification
- Kingdom: Animalia
- Phylum: Arthropoda
- Clade: Pancrustacea
- Class: Insecta
- Order: Hymenoptera
- Family: Colletidae
- Genus: Callohesma
- Species: C. tibialis

Binomial name
- Callohesma tibialis (Cardale, 1993)

Synonyms
- Euryglossa (Callohesma) tuberculata Exley, 1974; Euryglossa (Callohesma) tibialis Cardale, 1993

= Callohesma tibialis =

Species of bee

Callohesma tibialis is a species of bee in the family Colletidae and the subfamily Euryglossinae. It is endemic to Australia. It was described in 1993 by Australian entomologist Josephine Cardale.

== Distribution and habitat ==
The species occurs in southern inland Western Australia. The type locality is Yellowdine. Other published localities include Southern Cross and Dedari.

== Behaviour ==
The adults are flying mellivores.
