= Goodenia dyeri =

Scientific classification
- Kingdom: Plantae
- Clade: Tracheophytes
- Clade: Angiosperms
- Clade: Eudicots
- Clade: Asterids
- Order: Asterales
- Family: Goodeniaceae
- Genus: Goodenia
- Species: G. dyeri

Binomial name
- Goodenia dyeri K.Krause

Species of plant

Goodenia dyeri is a species of flowering plant in the family Goodeniaceae. It is endemic to the south-west of Western Australia. It is an ascending herb with egg-shaped, toothed leaves at the base of the plant, with solitary yellow flowers in the leaf axils.

== Description ==
Goodenia dyeri is an ascending herb that typically grows to a height of 20 cm (7.9 in) with soft, star-shaped hairs. The leaves are mostly arranged at the base of the plant and are egg-shaped with the narrower end towards the base and toothed or lyre-shaped, 30–50 mm (1.2–2.0 in) long and 10–15 mm (0.39–0.59 in) wide. The flowers are arranged singly in the axils of the leaves at the base of the plant with linear bracteoles about 6 mm (0.24 in) long, each flower on a pedicel 2–5 mm (0.079–0.197 in) long. The sepals are linear to lance-shaped, about 6 mm (0.24 in) long, the corolla yellow 12–14 mm (0.47–0.55 in) long. The lower lobes of the corolla are 4–4.5 mm (0.16–0.18 in) long with wings about 1.5 mm (0.059 in) wide. Flowering occurs from August to November and the fruit is a more or less spherical capsule 5–6 mm (0.20–0.24 in) in diameter.

== Taxonomy and naming ==
Goodenia dyeri was first formally described in 1912 by Kurt Krause in Adolf Engler's journal Das Pflanzenreich from material collected near the railway between Cunderdin and Dedari in 1903. The specific epithet (dyeri) honours William Turner Thiselton-Dyer, director of the Royal Botanic Gardens, Kew 1885–1905.

== Distribution and habitat ==
This goodenia grows on undulating plains between Cowcowing and Kalgoorlie in the south-west of Western Australia.

== Conservation status ==
Goodenia dyeri is classified as "not threatened" by the Government of Western Australia Department of Parks and Wildlife.
