= List of acts of the Parliament of Western Australia from 1898 =

This is a list of acts of the Parliament of Western Australia for the year 1898.

== 1898 ==
Short title, or popular name	Citation	Royal assent
Long title
	62 Vict. No. 1	1 August 1898
An Act to apply out of the Consolidated Revenue Fund and from Moneys to Credit of the General Loan Fund the sum of Eight Hundred and Fifty Thousand Pounds (Note: £850,000 in 1898 is equivalent to A$153,800,000 in 2022.) to the Service of the Year ending 30th June, 1899.
	62 Vict. No. 2	9 September 1898
An Act to protect the Goods of Lodgers against Distresses for Rent due to the Superior Landlord.
Warrants for Goods Indorsement Act 1898	62 Vict. No. 3	
Beer Duty Act 1898	62 Vict. No. 4	
Customs Duties Amendment Act 1898	62 Vict. No. 5	
	62 Vict. No. 6	4 October 1898
An Act to apply out of the Consolidated Revenue Fund and from Moneys to Credit of the General Loan Fund the sum of Three Hundred Thousand Pounds to the Service of the Year ending 30th June, 1899.
Re-appropriation of Loan Moneys Act 1898	62 Vict. No. 7	4 October 1898
An Act for the Re-appropriation of certain Moneys appropriated by "The Coolgardie Goldfields Water Supply Loan Act, 1896," (Note: Coolgardie Goldfields Water Supply Loan Act 1896 (60 Vict. No. 12)) and by "The Loan Act, 1896," (Note: Loan Act 1896 (60 Vict. No. 28)) and by "The Loans Consolidation Act, 1896." (Note: Loans Consolidation Act 1896 (60 Vict. No. 29))
Fire Brigades Act 1898	62 Vict. No. 8	
Crown Suits Act 1898	62 Vict. No. 9	
Jury Act 1898	62 Vict. No. 10	
	62 Vict. No. 11	28 October 1898
An Act to amend the Local Inscribed Stock Act, 1897. (Note: Local Inscribed Stock Act 1897 (61 Vict. No. 8))
	62 Vict. No. 12	28 October 1898
An Act to apply a sum out of the Consolidated Revenue Fund and from Moneys to Credit of the General Loan Fund to the Services of the Year ending the last day of June, One thousand eight hundred and ninety-nine, and to appropriate the Supplies granted in this Session of Parliament.
Prevention of Crimes Act 1898	62 Vict. No. 13	
	62 Vict. No. 14	28 October 1898
An Act to authorise the Closing of certain Roads and Streets.
Bankruptcy Act Amendment Act 1898	62 Vict. No. 15	
Goldfields Act 1895 Amendment Act 1898	62 Vict. No. 16	
Bush Fires Act 1885 Amendment Act 1898	62 Vict. No. 17	
	62 Vict. No. 18	28 October 1898
An Act to vest certain Land at Coolgardie in the Municipality of Coolgardie for a Mining Exhibition and other purposes.
Coolgardie Goldfields Water Supply Construction Act 1898	62 Vict. No. 19	28 October 1898
An Act to authorise the Construction of Works for the supply of Water to the Coolgardie Goldfields.
Agricultural Lands Purchase Amendment Act 1898	62 Vict. No. 20	
Police Act Amendment Act 1898	62 Vict. No. 21	
Metropolitan Water Works Act 1896 Amendment Act 1898	62 Vict. No. 22	
Marriage Act 1894 Amendment Act 1898	62 Vict. No. 23	
Health Act 1898	62 Vict. No. 24	
Cemeteries Act 1897 Amendment Act 1898	62 Vict. No. 25	
Municipal Institutions Act 1895 Amendment Act 1898	62 Vict. No. 26	
Insect Pests Amendment Act 1898	62 Vict. No. 27	
	62 Vict. No. 28	28 October 1898
An Act to amend the Companies Act, 1893, Amendment Act, 1897. (Note: Companies Act Amendment Act 1897 (61 Vict. No. 35))
Mining On Private Property Act 1898	62 Vict. No. 29	
Interpretation Act 1898	62 Vict. No. 30	28 October 1898
An Act for consolidating enactments relating to the Construction of Acts of Parliament, and for further shortening the Language used in Acts of Parliament.
	62 Vict. No. 31	28 October 1898
An Act to render valid a General Rate made by the Municipality of Coolgardie for the current year.
Zoological Gardens Act 1898	62 Vict. No. 32	28 October 1898
An Act for the Establishment of Zoological and Acclimatisation Gardens at South Perth.
	62 Vict. No. 33	28 October 1898
An Act to authorise the Closing of portions of South Terrace and Market Street, Fremantle.
Wines, Beer, and Spirit Sale Amendment Act 1898	62 Vict. No. 34	
Workmen's Wages Act 1898	62 Vict. No. 35	
Early Closing Act 1898	62 Vict. No. 36	
Land Act 1898	62 Vict. No. 37	28 October 1898
An Act to consolidate, and amend the Laws relating to the Sale, Occupation, and Management of Crown Lands, and for other purposes.

== Sources ==
- "legislation.wa.gov.au".
