= Leioproctus cardaleae =

Scientific classification
- Kingdom: Animalia
- Phylum: Arthropoda
- Clade: Pancrustacea
- Class: Insecta
- Order: Hymenoptera
- Family: Colletidae
- Genus: Leioproctus
- Species: L. cardaleae

Binomial name
- Leioproctus cardaleae Maynard 1997

Species of bee

Leioproctus cardaleae, or Leioproctus (Odontocolletes) cardaleae, is a species of bee in the family Colletidae and subfamily Colletinae. It is endemic to Australia. It was described by Australian entomologist Glynn Maynard in 1997.

== Etymology ==
The specific epithet cardaleae honours entomologist Josephine Cardale, who collected many specimens.

== Description ==
Female body length is 8 mm, male body length 7 mm. Integumental colouration is mainly black, with a distinctive, broad orange band on the metasoma. The hair is mostly white.

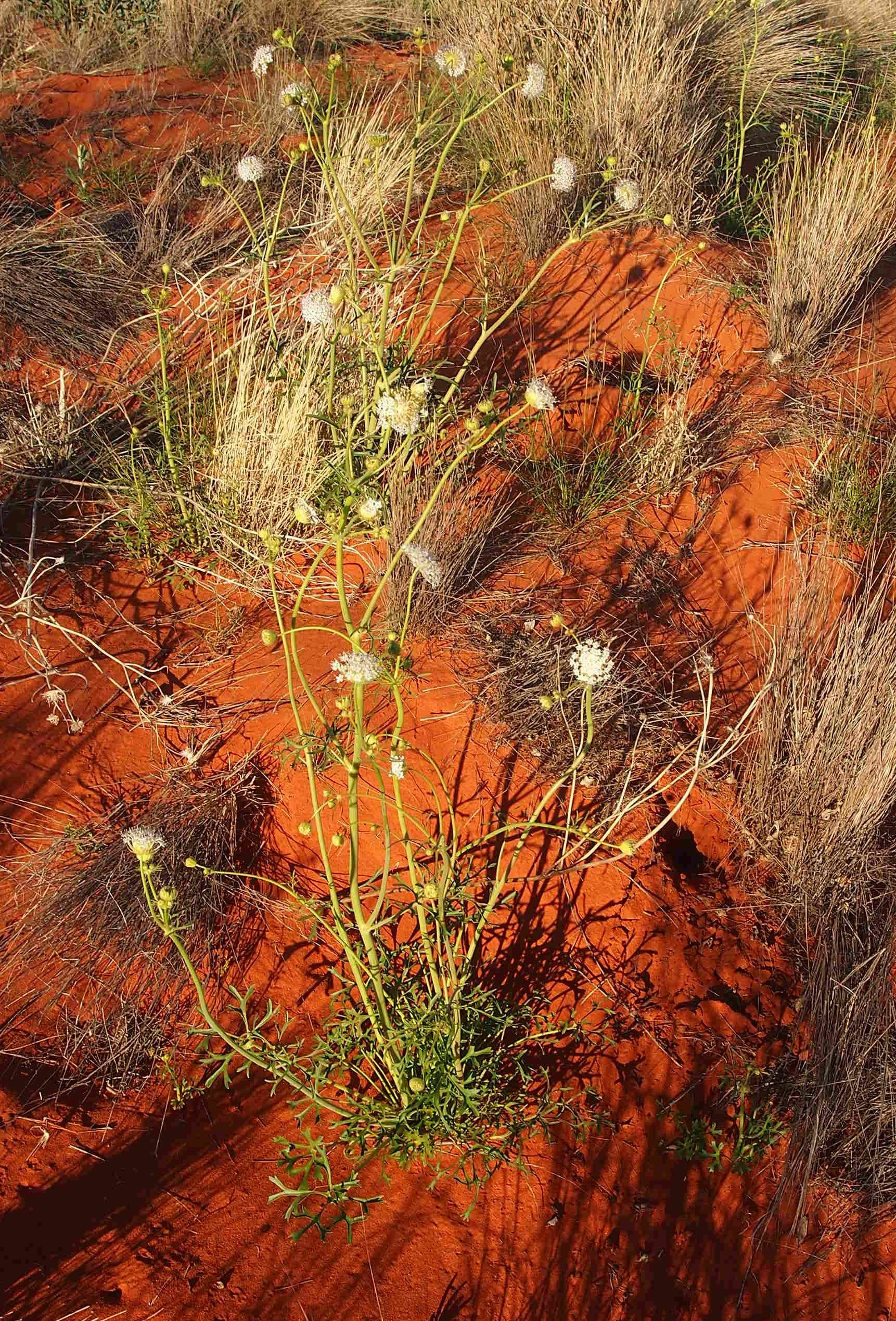
Trachymne glaucifolia (native carrot), a forage plant of the bees

== Distribution and habitat ==
The species occurs in arid central and eastern inland Australia. The type locality is 32 km south-east of Alice Springs, in the south of the Northern Territory. It has also been recorded from Welbourne Hill Station in northern South Australia and from near Charleville, Queensland.

== Behaviour ==
The adults are flying mellivores. Flowering plants visited by the bees include Podolepis canescens, Scaevola depauperata and Trachymene glaucifolia, as well as Wahlenbergia species.

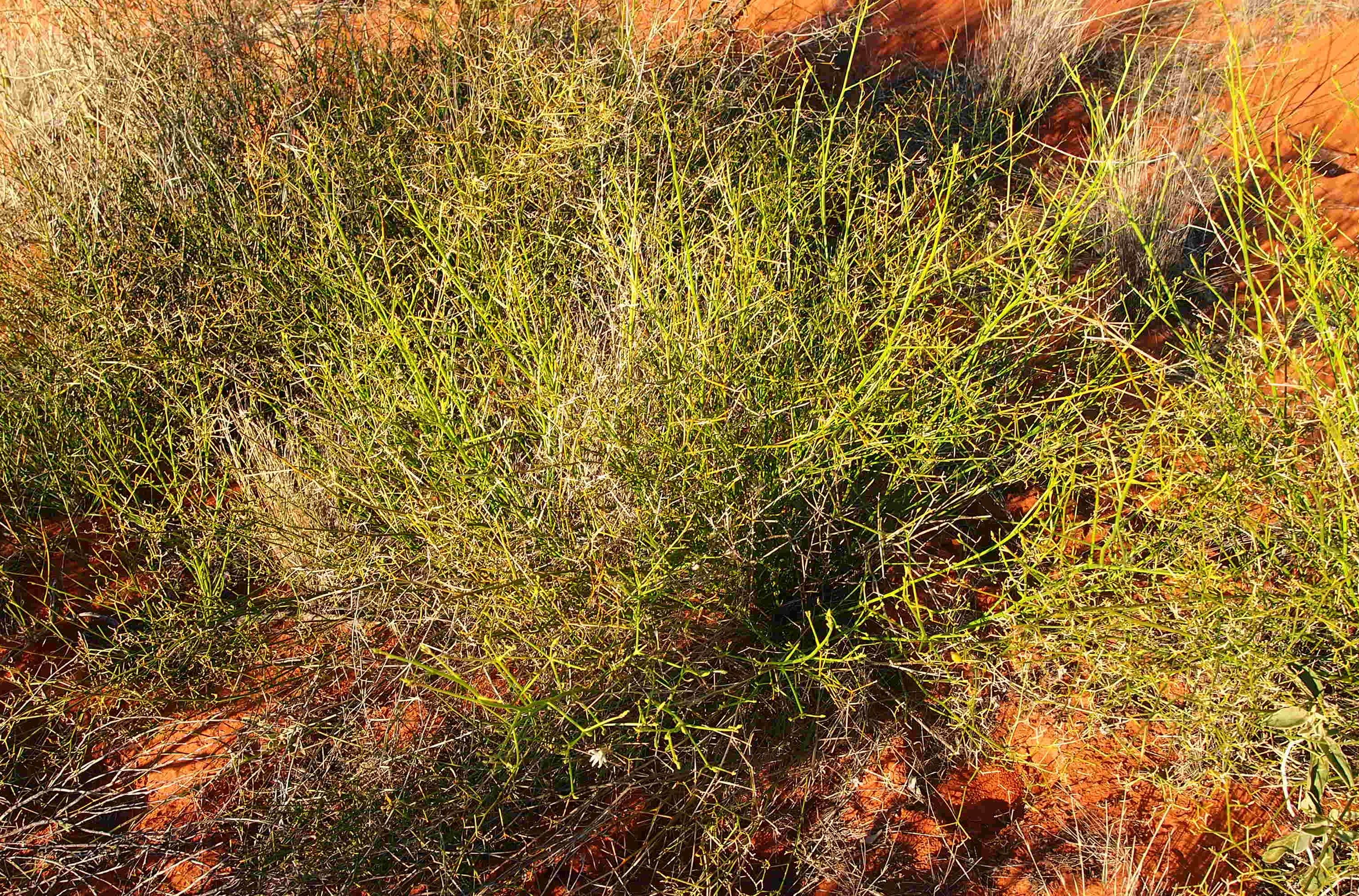
Scaevola depauperata (skeleton fan-flower), a forage plant of the bees
