= Gilgai, Western Australia =

Locality in Western Australia

Gilgai, Western Australia was the location of Number 7 Pumping station on the Goldfields Water Supply Scheme

It was also located on the Eastern Goldfields Railway.

It was located between number 6 pumping station located at Ghouli, and number 8 at Dedari.
