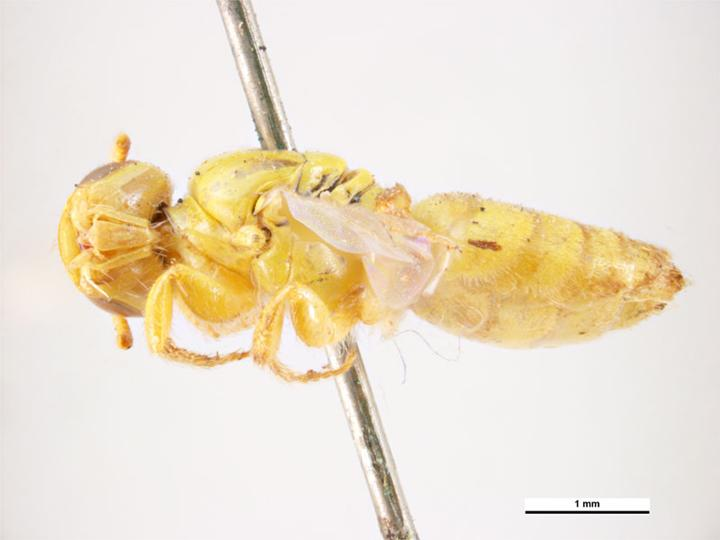
- Female

Scientific classification
- Kingdom: Animalia
- Phylum: Arthropoda
- Clade: Pancrustacea
- Class: Insecta
- Order: Hymenoptera
- Family: Colletidae
- Genus: Callohesma
- Species: C. sulphurea

Binomial name
- Callohesma sulphurea (Michener, 1965)

Synonyms
- Euryglossa (Callohesma) sulphurea Michener, 1965

= Callohesma sulphurea =

Species of bee

Callohesma sulphurea is a species of bee in the family Colletidae and the subfamily Euryglossinae. It is endemic to Australia. It was described in 1965 by American entomologist Charles Duncan Michener.

== Distribution and habitat ==
The species occurs in southern Australia. The type locality is Gnowangerup, Western Australia.

== Behaviour ==
The adults are flying mellivores. Flowering plants visited by the bees include Eucalyptus species.

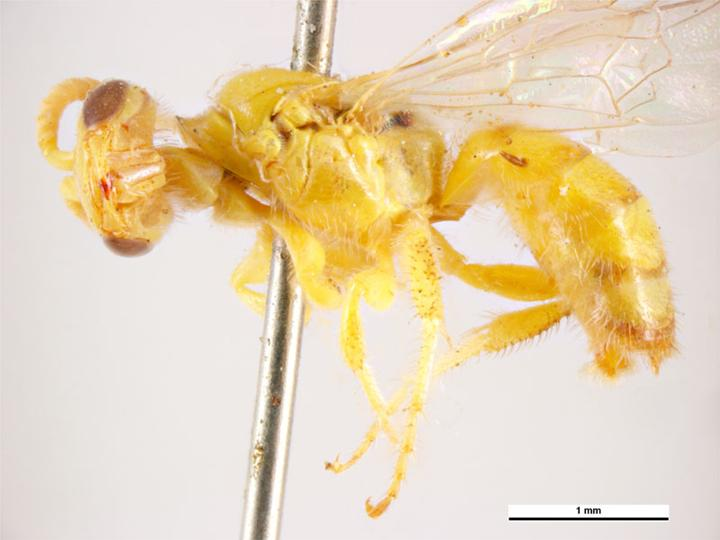
Male
