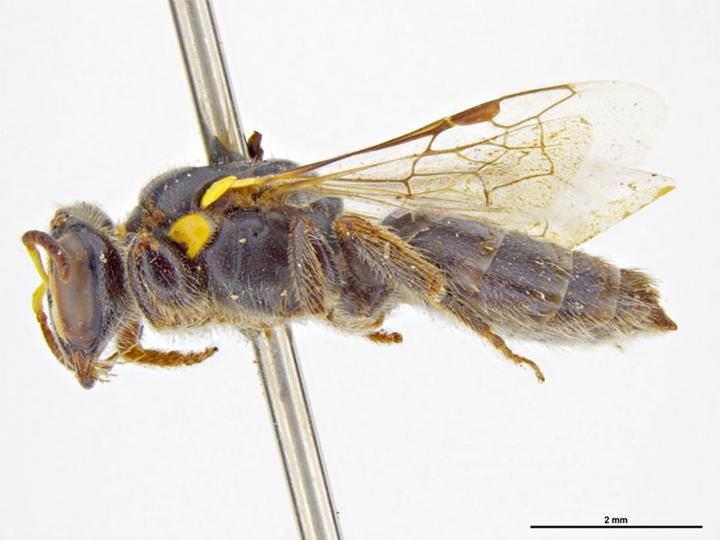
- Female

Scientific classification
- Kingdom: Animalia
- Phylum: Arthropoda
- Clade: Pancrustacea
- Class: Insecta
- Order: Hymenoptera
- Family: Colletidae
- Genus: Callohesma
- Species: C. aureopicta

Binomial name
- Callohesma aureopicta (Cockerell, 1929)

Synonyms
- Euryglossa aureopicta Cockerell, 1929

= Callohesma aureopicta =

Species of bee

Callohesma aureopicta is a species of bee in the family Colletidae and the subfamily Euryglossinae. It is endemic to Australia. It was described in 1929 by British-American entomologist Theodore Dru Alison Cockerell.

== Description ==
The female holotype has a body length of 7 mm. The head and thorax are black, the abdomen dull bluish-green, the legs dark reddish-brown.

== Distribution and habitat ==
The species occurs in south-west Western Australia. The type locality is King George Sound.

== Behaviour ==
The adults are flying mellivores. Flowering plants visited by the bees include Eucalyptus species.
