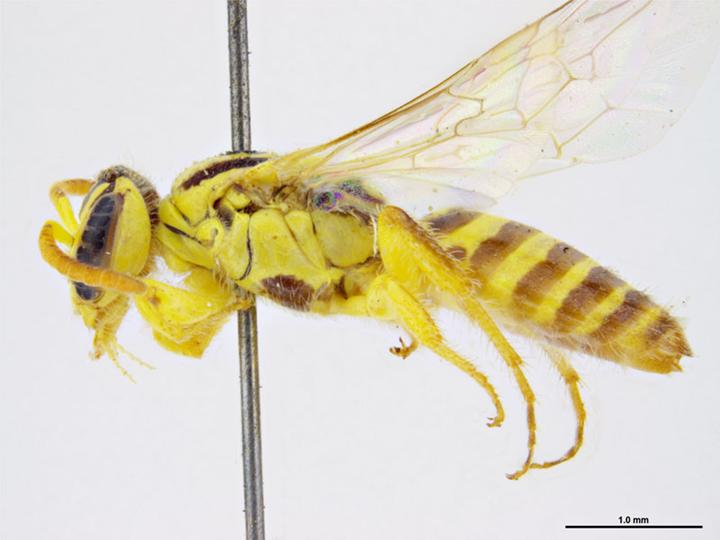
- Male

Scientific classification
- Kingdom: Animalia
- Phylum: Arthropoda
- Clade: Pancrustacea
- Class: Insecta
- Order: Hymenoptera
- Family: Colletidae
- Genus: Callohesma
- Species: C. flava

Binomial name
- Callohesma flava (Exley, 1974)

Synonyms
- Euryglossa (Callohesma) flava Exley, 1974

= Callohesma flava =

Species of bee

Callohesma flava is a species of bee in the family Colletidae and the subfamily Euryglossinae. It is endemic to Australia. It was described in 1974 by Australian entomologist Elizabeth Exley.

== Distribution and habitat ==
The species occurs in northern Australia. The type locality is Mount Isa in north-west Queensland. It has also been recorded from nearby Lake Moondarra as well as from MacDonald Downs Station in the Northern Territory.

== Behaviour ==
The adults are flying mellivores. Flowering plants visited by the bees include Eucalyptus species.
