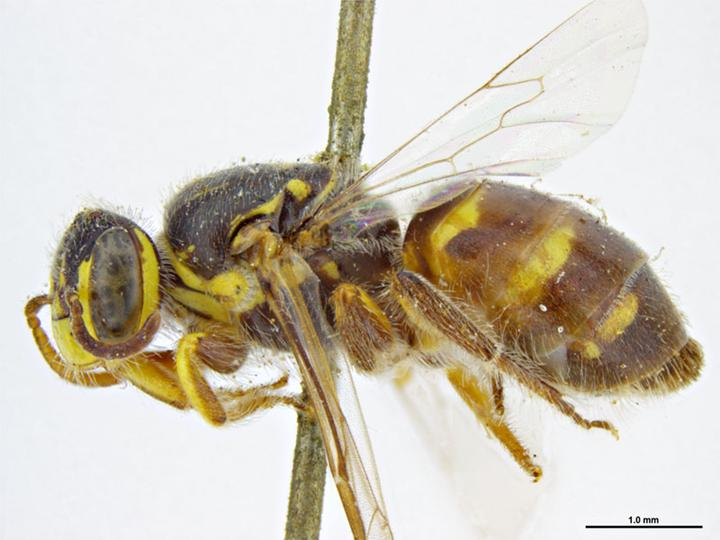
- Female

Scientific classification
- Kingdom: Animalia
- Phylum: Arthropoda
- Clade: Pancrustacea
- Class: Insecta
- Order: Hymenoptera
- Family: Colletidae
- Genus: Callohesma
- Species: C. occidentalis

Binomial name
- Callohesma occidentalis (Exley, 1974)

Synonyms
- Euryglossa (Callohesma) occidentalis Exley, 1974

= Callohesma occidentalis =

Species of bee

Callohesma occidentalis is a species of bee in the family Colletidae and the subfamily Euryglossinae. It is endemic to Australia. It was described in 1974 by Australian entomologist Elizabeth Exley.

== Distribution and habitat ==
The species occurs in south-west Western Australia. The type locality is Bunbury. It has also been recorded from Perth.

== Behaviour ==
The adults are flying mellivores.
