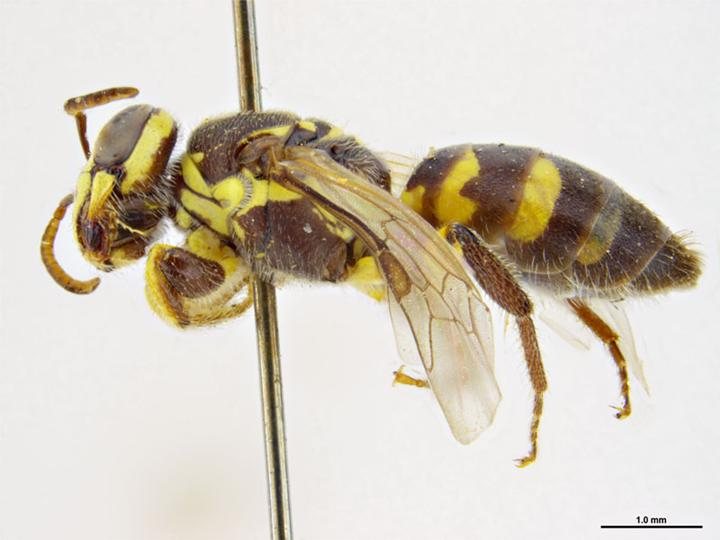
- Female

Scientific classification
- Kingdom: Animalia
- Phylum: Arthropoda
- Clade: Pancrustacea
- Class: Insecta
- Order: Hymenoptera
- Family: Colletidae
- Genus: Callohesma
- Species: C. calliopsiformis

Binomial name
- Callohesma calliopsiformis (Cockerell, 1905)

Synonyms
- Euryglossa calliopsiformis Cockerell, 1905

= Callohesma calliopsiformis =

Species of bee

Callohesma calliopsiformis is a species of bee in the family Colletidae and the subfamily Euryglossinae. It is endemic to Australia. It was described in 1905 by British-American entomologist Theodore Dru Alison Cockerell.

== Distribution and habitat ==
The species occurs in eastern and western Australia. The type locality is Mackay, Queensland.

== Behaviour ==
The adults are flying mellivores. Flowering plants visited by the bees include Angophora, Eucalyptus, Eugenia, Jacksonia, Leptospermum and Melaleuca species.

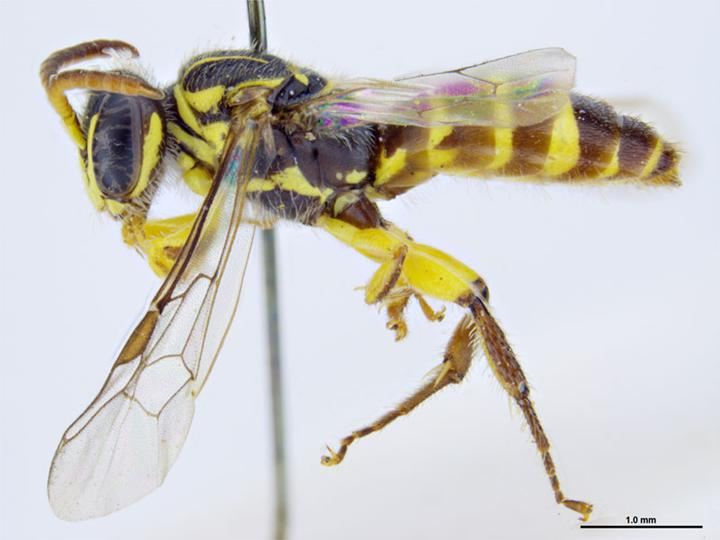
Male
