= Burlong Pool, Western Australia =

River pool in the Wheatbelt region of Western Australia

Coordinates: 31.68131°S 116.64203°E

Burlong Pool (Note: Due to its proximity to Northam, some references are found as calling the location – Burlong Pool, Northam.) is a section of the Avon River in Western Australia between Spencers Brook and Northam. (Note: Also referred to at times as the Burlong Swimming Pool.)

== Water trains ==
Burlong Pool was a former railway stopping place, which was used as a location for drawing water into the water trains to the Eastern Goldfield locations prior to the completion of the Goldfields Water Supply Scheme.

During dry weather in the late 1890s up to five separate water trains per day would draw water from the pool and transport it to the goldfields.

== Swimming location ==
Following the completion of the Goldfields water supply pipeline the water was no longer extracted from the pool, but the location was notable for being used as the Northam swimming carnival location, swimming location and rail excursions, and the site of drownings.

== Wagyl location ==
As a long deep pool that was well watered in summertime, the location was known to the Noongar as a place where the Wagyl had a summer resting place.

== Military history ==
Burlong Pool was owned by the Western Australian Government Railways. It was leased by the Australian Army during World War II. During the 1940s and 1950s it was the location for training for water crossings, bridge building and water obstacles. Many bridge parts and tools are believed to lie on the bottom of the pool. A rock river crossing allowed access from the rear of the Northam Army Camp to Burlong and Spencers Brook Roads.

== See also ==
- Railway dams and reservoirs of Western Australia
