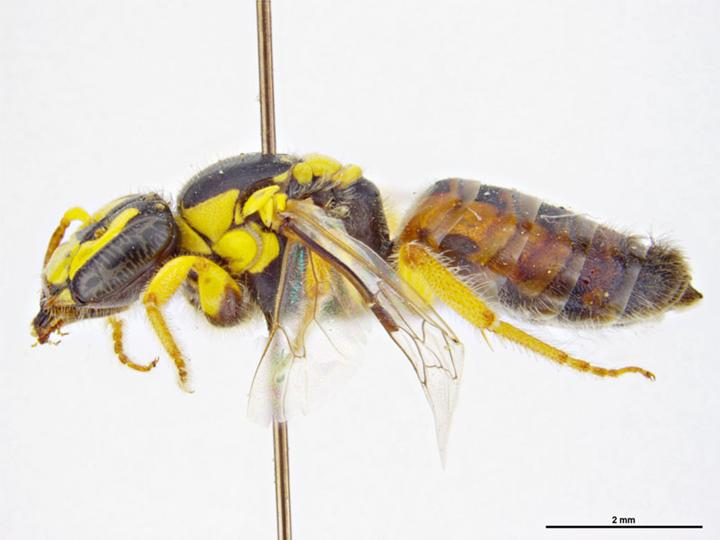
- Female

Scientific classification
- Kingdom: Animalia
- Phylum: Arthropoda
- Clade: Pancrustacea
- Class: Insecta
- Order: Hymenoptera
- Family: Colletidae
- Genus: Callohesma
- Species: C. sinapipes

Binomial name
- Callohesma sinapipes (Cockerell, 1910)

Synonyms
- Euryglossa sinapipes Cockerell, 1910; Euryglossa carnosa Cockerell, 1913; Euryglossa sinapina Cockerell, 1913; Euryglossa melanothorax Rayment, 1935

= Callohesma sinapipes =

Species of bee

Callohesma sinapipes is a species of bee in the family Colletidae and the subfamily Euryglossinae. It is endemic to Australia. It was described in 1910 by British-American entomologist Theodore Dru Alison Cockerell.

== Distribution and habitat ==
The species occurs in western and southern mainland Australia. Type localities include Adelaide and Purnong in South Australia.

== Behaviour ==
The adults are flying mellivores. Flowering plants visited by the bees include Eucalyptus species.

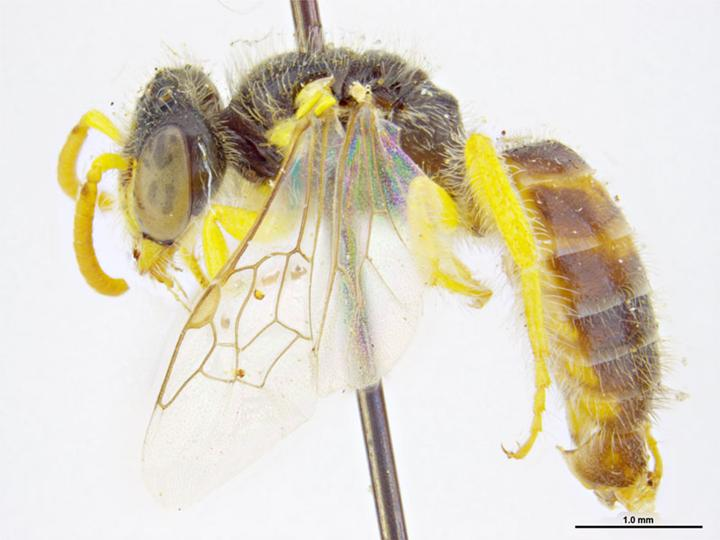
Male
