= Yerbillon, Western Australia =

Locality in Western Australia

Yerbillon, Western Australia was the location of Number 5 Pumping station on the Goldfields Water Supply Scheme, and is the location of the current pumping station number 11 on the pipeline.

It was also located on the Eastern Goldfields Railway. It was the location of a railway accident in 1902.

It was located between number 4 pumping station at Merredin, and number 6 at Ghouli.
