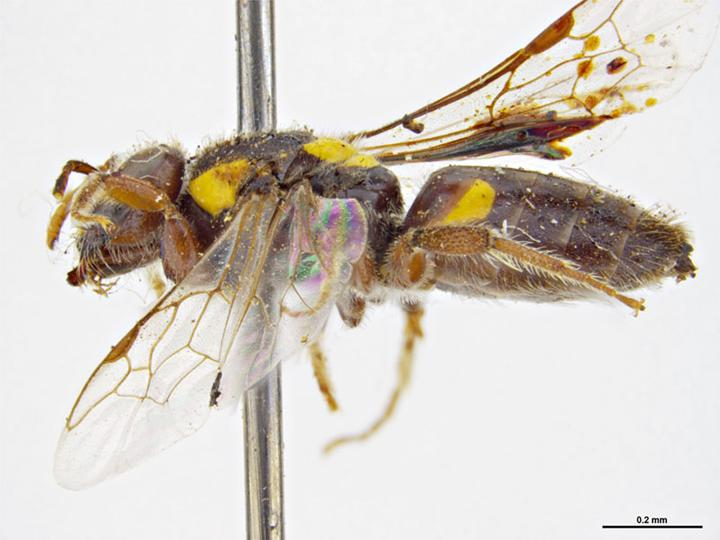
- Female

Scientific classification
- Kingdom: Animalia
- Phylum: Arthropoda
- Clade: Pancrustacea
- Class: Insecta
- Order: Hymenoptera
- Family: Colletidae
- Genus: Callohesma
- Species: C. geminata

Binomial name
- Callohesma geminata (Cockerell, 1911)

Synonyms
- Euryglossa geminata Cockerell, 1911

= Callohesma geminata =

Species of bee

Callohesma geminata is a species of bee in the family Colletidae and the subfamily Euryglossinae. It is endemic to Australia. It was described in 1911 by British-American entomologist Theodore Dru Alison Cockerell.

== Distribution and habitat ==
The species occurs in Victoria. The type locality is Cheltenham. Other published localities are Tooradin, Mount Yule near Healesville, and Cranbourne.

== Behaviour ==
The adults are flying mellivores. Flowering plants visited by the bees include Eucalyptus species.
