= Railway dams and reservoirs of Western Australia =

Railway dams and reservoirs were used to supply water to an extensive railway system that ventured into low rainfall, and poor water quality areas of the inner regions of Western Australia in the 1890s.

Some of the dams were made redundant with the completion of the Goldfields Water Supply Scheme which provided a more certain supply along the Eastern and Goldfields lines.

== Droughts ==
Seasonal variations and drought conditions in various areas made rainfall and re-filling of dams a reportable event in the West Australian media.

== Water quality ==
Water quality was a perennial problem, and some dams and supplies had levels of unwanted salinity and other ingredients that seriously affected the life-time of the boilers in steam locomotives used by the Western Australian Government Railways (WAGR).

== Eastern Railway ==
In the 1890s the Eastern Railway was designated as being from Fremantle to Kalgoorlie.

Railway dams were located at:

- Midland Junction
- Chidlows Well
- Clackline Junction
- Spencers Brook
- Burlong Pool
- Northam

== Eastern Goldfields Railway ==
The Eastern Goldfields railway started east of Northam, following development of other branch lines from Northam.

- Cunderdin (to Public Works Department (Western Australia) in 1903)
- Tammin
- Kellerberrin
- Merredin
- Burracoppin
- Bodallin
- Parkers Pool (1899) (Parkers Road 1900+)
- Southern Cross Parsonage (Parsonage dropped 1905)
- Yellowdine No. 1
- Yellowdine No. 2
- Karalee
- Koorarawalyee
- Boorabbin No. 1
- Boorabbin No. 2
- Boondi
- Woolgangie No. 1
- Woolgangie No. 2
- Bullabulling No. 1
- Bullabulling No. 2
- Broad Arrow
- Bardoc
- Goongarrie
- Kanowna (not WAGR 1903)
- Coolgardie
- Niagara (not WAGR 1903)
- Malcolm (1905 +)
- Laverton (1905 +)

== Great Southern Railway ==
The Great Southern Railway was originally a private land grant railway, and was later taken over by the government.

- 1890s (Beverley – Albany)
- Later starting points of the Great Southern were at York, Spencers Brook, Avon Yard.
- 195 – Mile (Yornan)
- Wagin Lake (Wagin)
- Tambellup
- Cranbrook
- Albany

== Northern Railways ==
- Mullewa
- Yalgoo
- Mount Magnet
- Day Dawn (1903 +)
- Stakewell (1905 +)
- Nallan (1905 +)

== WAGR annual reports ==
The information about the dams – Return of Reservoirs – can be found in the WAGR annual reports, but there is no consistency as to which appendices they are listed in during the period 1899–1905.

- 1899 Appendix G p. 47
- 1900 Appendix D p. 57
- 1901 Appendix D p. 61
- 1903 Appendix F p. 54

The appendices are fully expanded tables that include the capacity of the dams, as well as their location in miles from the Perth railway station.

== See also ==
- Granite outcrops of Western Australia
