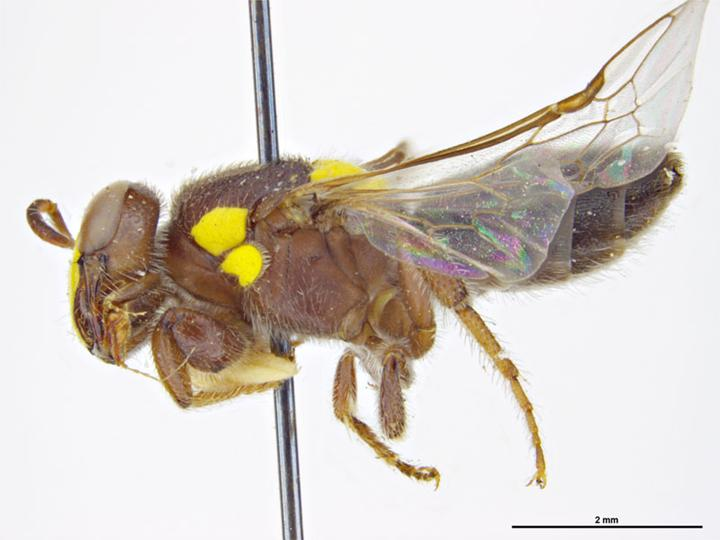
- Female

Scientific classification
- Kingdom: Animalia
- Phylum: Arthropoda
- Clade: Pancrustacea
- Class: Insecta
- Order: Hymenoptera
- Family: Colletidae
- Genus: Callohesma
- Species: C. aurantifera

Binomial name
- Callohesma aurantifera (Cockerell, 1912)

Synonyms
- Euryglossa aurantifera Cockerell, 1912; Euryglossa cambournii Rayment, 1939

= Callohesma aurantifera =

Species of bee

Callohesma aurantifera is a species of bee in the family Colletidae and the subfamily Euryglossinae. It is endemic to Australia. It was described in 1912 by British-American entomologist Theodore Dru Alison Cockerell.

== Distribution and habitat ==
The species occurs in eastern mainland Australia. Type localities include Sydney and Gosford in New South Wales.

== Behaviour ==
The adults are flying mellivores. Flowering plants visited by the bees include Leptospermum and Melaleuca species.

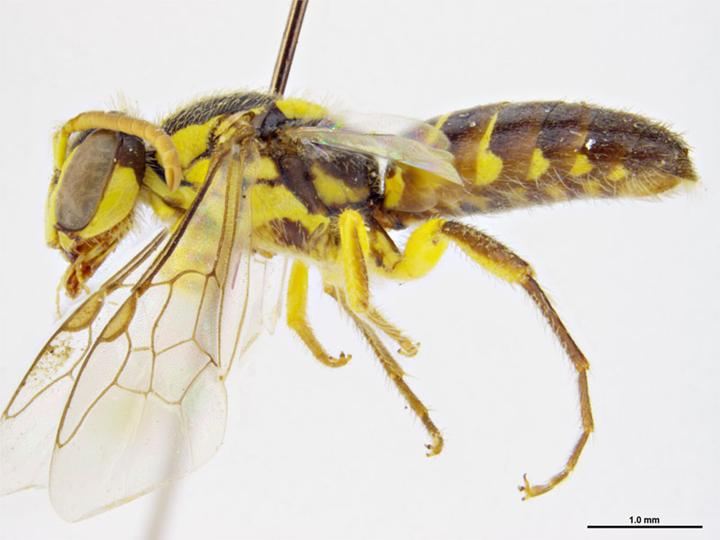
Male
