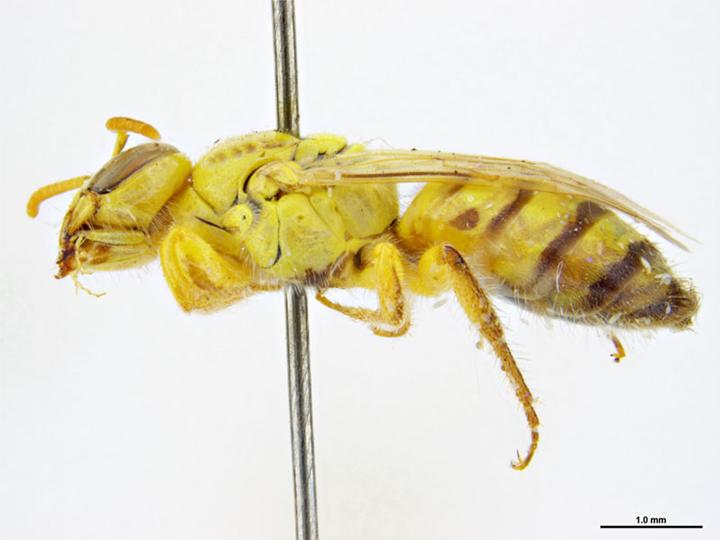
- Female

Scientific classification
- Kingdom: Animalia
- Phylum: Arthropoda
- Clade: Pancrustacea
- Class: Insecta
- Order: Hymenoptera
- Family: Colletidae
- Genus: Callohesma
- Species: C. skermani

Binomial name
- Callohesma skermani (Exley, 1974)

Synonyms
- Euryglossa (Callohesma) skermani Exley, 1974

= Callohesma skermani =

Species of bee

Callohesma skermani is a species of bee in the family Colletidae and the subfamily Euryglossinae. It is endemic to Australia. It was described in 1974 by Australian entomologist Elizabeth Exley.

== Distribution and habitat ==
The species occurs in north-west Western Australia. The type locality is Karratha. It has also been recorded from the vicinity of Dampier.

== Behaviour ==
The adults are flying mellivores. Flowering plants visited by the bees include Eucalyptus species.

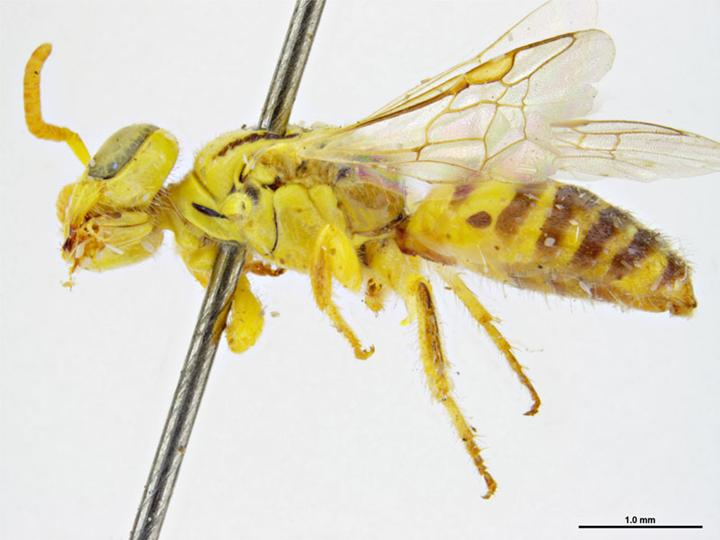
Male
