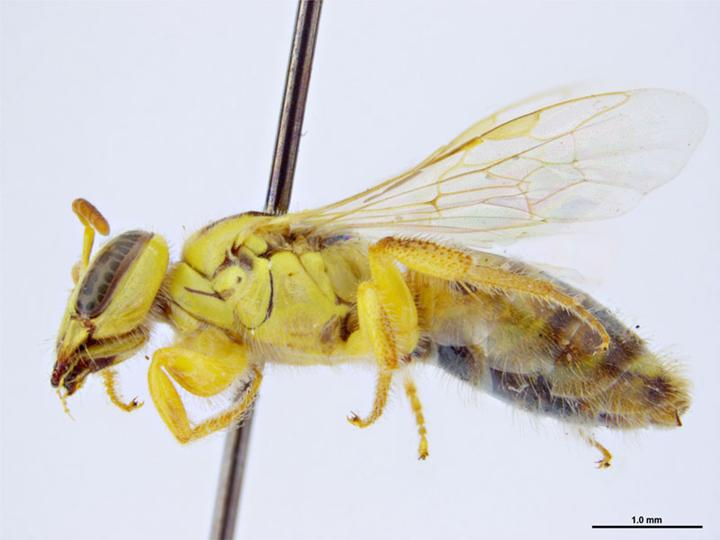
- Female

Scientific classification
- Kingdom: Animalia
- Phylum: Arthropoda
- Clade: Pancrustacea
- Class: Insecta
- Order: Hymenoptera
- Family: Colletidae
- Genus: Callohesma
- Species: C. queenslandensis

Binomial name
- Callohesma queenslandensis (Exley, 1974)

Synonyms
- Euryglossa (Callohesma) queenslandensis Exley, 1974

= Callohesma queenslandensis =

Species of bee

Callohesma queenslandensis is a species of bee in the family Colletidae and the subfamily Euryglossinae. It is endemic to Australia. It was described in 1974 by Australian entomologist Elizabeth Exley.

== Distribution and habitat ==
The species occurs in southern inland Queensland. The type locality is Charleville. It has also been recorded from Morven.

== Behaviour ==
The adults are flying mellivores. Flowering plants visited by the bees include Eucalyptus species.

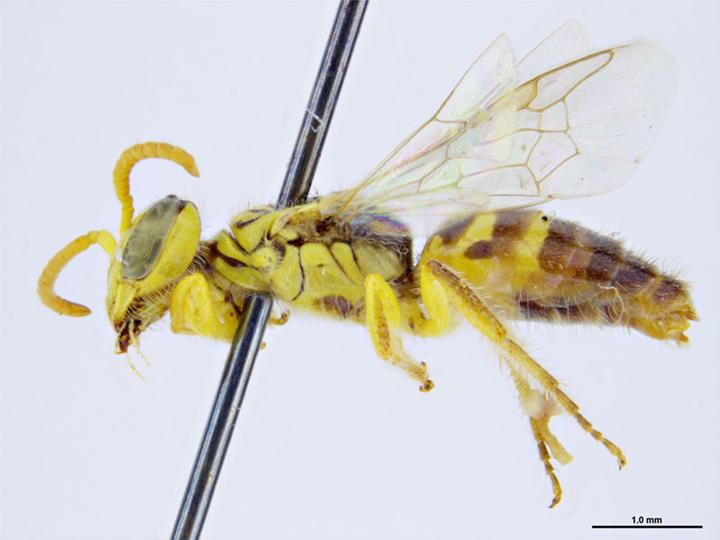
Male
