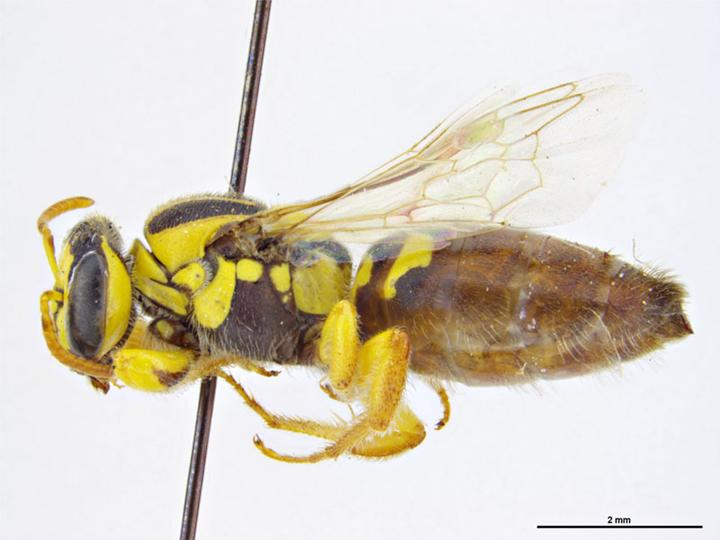
- Female

Scientific classification
- Kingdom: Animalia
- Phylum: Arthropoda
- Clade: Pancrustacea
- Class: Insecta
- Order: Hymenoptera
- Family: Colletidae
- Genus: Callohesma
- Species: C. euxantha

Binomial name
- Callohesma euxantha (Perkins, 1912)

Synonyms
- Euryglossa euxantha Perkins, 1912

= Callohesma euxantha =

Species of bee

Callohesma euxantha is a species of bee in the family Colletidae and the subfamily Euryglossinae. It is endemic to Australia. It was described in 1912 by British entomologist Robert Cyril Layton Perkins.

== Distribution and habitat ==
The type locality is Darwin, Northern Territory. It has also been recorded from Queensland and South Australia.

== Behaviour ==
The adults are flying mellivores. Flowering plants visited by the bees include Eucalyptus species.

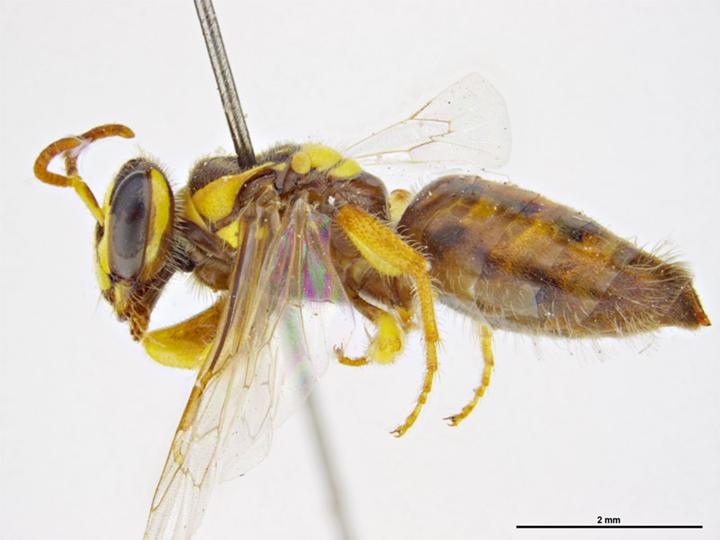
Male
