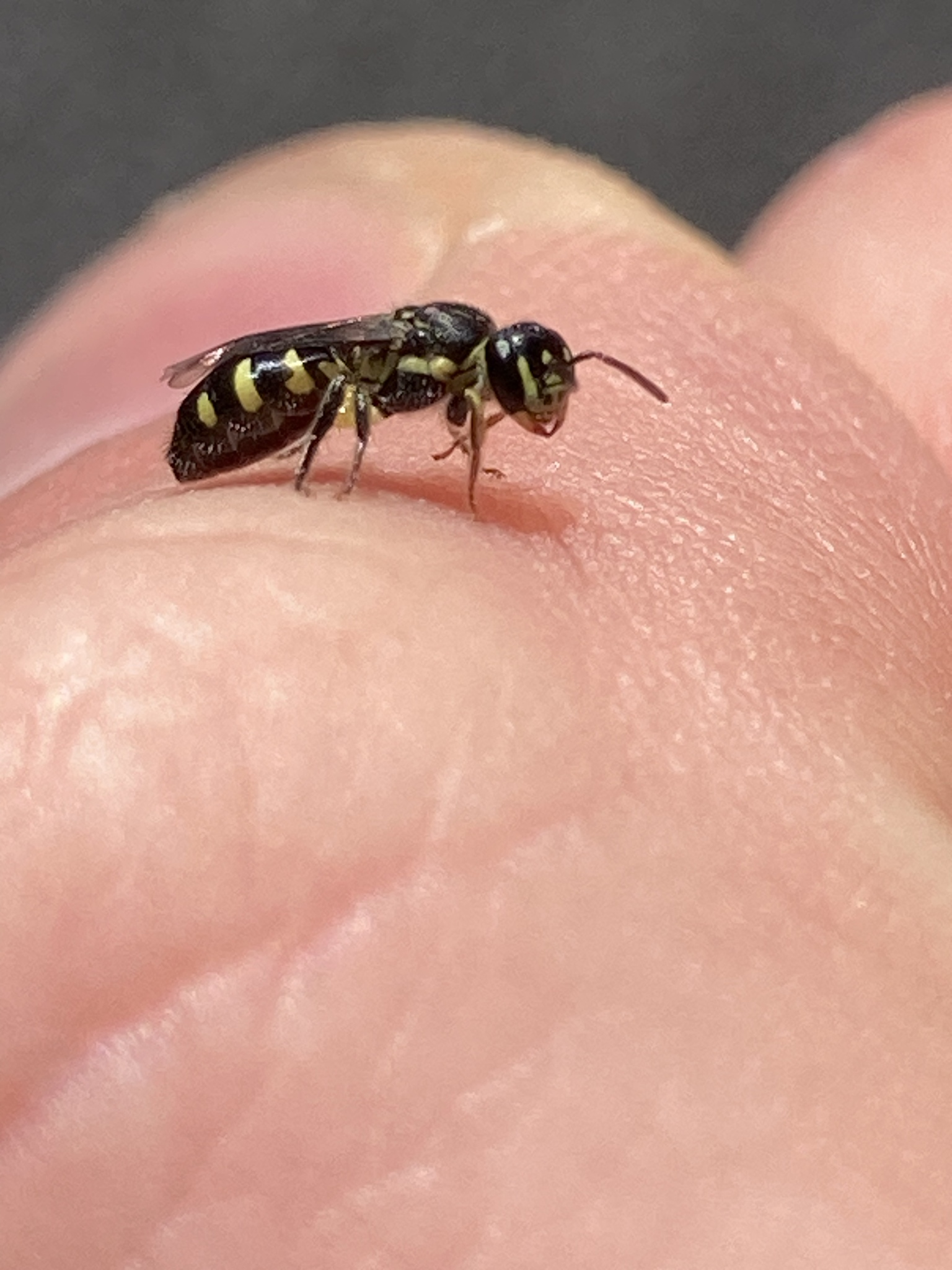
- Callohesma calliopsiformis

Scientific classification
- Kingdom: Animalia
- Phylum: Arthropoda
- Clade: Pancrustacea
- Class: Insecta
- Order: Hymenoptera
- Family: Colletidae
- Genus: Callohesma; Michener, 1965

= Callohesma =

Genus of bees

Callohesma is a genus of plasterer bees in the subfamily Euryglossinae. It was described, as a subgenus of Euryglossa, by American entomologist Charles Duncan Michener in 1965, and revised by Australian entomologist Elizabeth Exley in 1974. It is endemic to Australia.

== Species ==
As of 2026 the genus contained some 34 described species:

- Callohesma albiceris (Exley, 1974)
- Callohesma aurantifera (Cockerell, 1912)
- Callohesma aureopicta (Cockerell, 1929)
- Callohesma calliopsella (Cockerell, 1910)
- Callohesma calliopsiformis (Cockerell, 1905)
- Callohesma campbelli (Cockerell, 1929)
- Callohesma chlora (Exley, 1974)
- Callohesma coolgardensis (Exley, 1974)
- Callohesma eustonensis (Exley, 1974)
- Callohesma euxantha (Perkins, 1912)
- Callohesma flava (Exley, 1974)
- Callohesma flavopicta (Smith, 1879)
- Callohesma geminata (Cockerell, 1911)
- Callohesma karratha (Exley, 1974)
- Callohesma lacteipennis (Michener, 1965)
- Callohesma lucida (Exley, 1974)
- Callohesma matthewsi (Exley, 1974)
- Callohesma megachlora (Exley, 1974)
- Callohesma nigripicta (Exley, 1974)
- Callohesma occidentalis (Exley, 1974)
- Callohesma ornatula (Cockerell, 1929)
- Callohesma pedalis (Exley, 1974)
- Callohesma picta (Smith, 1854)
- Callohesma quadrimaculata (Smith, 1879)
- Callohesma queenslandensis (Exley, 1974)
- Callohesma recta (Exley, 1974)
- Callohesma rieki (Exley, 1974)
- Callohesma setula (Exley, 1974)
- Callohesma sinapipes (Cockerell, 1910)
- Callohesma skermani (Exley, 1974)
- Callohesma splendens (Exley, 1974)
- Callohesma sulphurea (Michener, 1965)
- Callohesma tibialis (Cardale, 1993)
- Callohesma townsvillensis (Exley, 1974)
