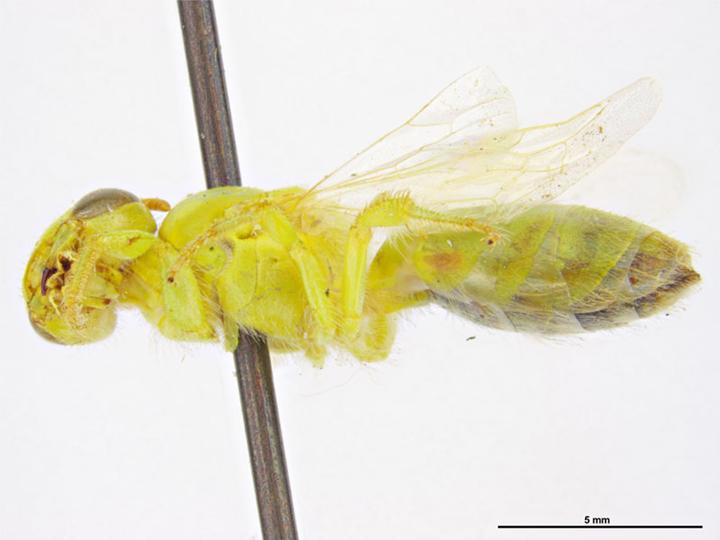
- Female

Scientific classification
- Kingdom: Animalia
- Phylum: Arthropoda
- Clade: Pancrustacea
- Class: Insecta
- Order: Hymenoptera
- Family: Colletidae
- Genus: Callohesma
- Species: C. chlora

Binomial name
- Callohesma chlora (Exley, 1974)

Synonyms
- Euryglossa (Callohesma) chlora Exley, 1974

= Callohesma chlora =

Species of bee

Callohesma chlora is a species of bee in the family Colletidae and the subfamily Euryglossinae. It is endemic to Australia. It was described in 1974 by Australian entomologist Elizabeth Exley.

== Distribution and habitat ==
The species occurs in central Australia in the southern part of the Northern Territory. The type locality is 22 km north of Barrow Creek on the Stuart Highway.

== Behaviour ==
The adults are flying mellivores.
