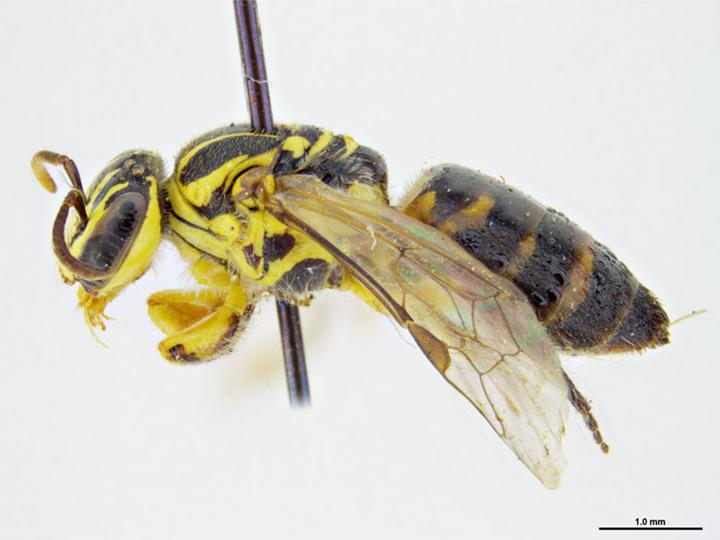
- Female

Scientific classification
- Kingdom: Animalia
- Phylum: Arthropoda
- Clade: Pancrustacea
- Class: Insecta
- Order: Hymenoptera
- Family: Colletidae
- Genus: Callohesma
- Species: C. flavopicta

Binomial name
- Callohesma flavopicta (Smith, 1879)

Synonyms
- Euryglossa flavopicta Smith, 1879; Euryglossa tridentifrons Cockerell, 1913; Euryglossa strigosa Rayment, 1935; Euryglossa raffae Rayment, 1935

= Callohesma flavopicta =

Species of bee

Callohesma flavopicta is a species of bee in the family Colletidae and the subfamily Euryglossinae. It is endemic to Australia. It was described in 1879 by English entomologist Frederick Smith.

== Distribution and habitat ==
The species occurs in western and eastern Australia. Type localities include Geraldton in Western Australia, as well as Nagambie, Sandringham and Mallacoota in Victoria.

== Behaviour ==
The adults are flying mellivores. Flowering plants visited by the bees include Angophora, Eucalyptus, Leptospermum and Melaleuca species.

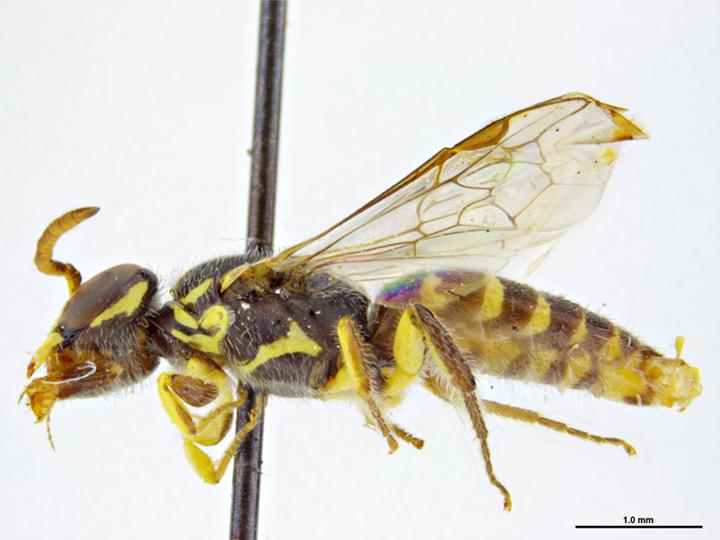
Male
