= Mephan Ferguson =

Australian manufacturer

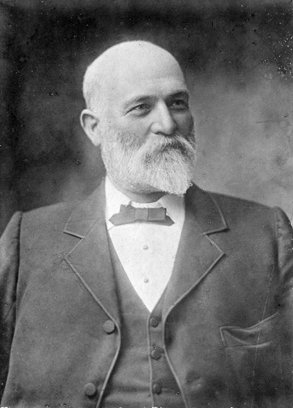
Mephan Ferguson circa 1900

Mephan Ferguson (25 July 1843 – 2 November 1919) was an Australian manufacturer, particularly of water supply pipes, notably for the pipeline to the Western Australian goldfields. He was born in Falkirk, Scotland. He immigrated with his parents to Melbourne in the colony of Victoria in Australia arriving in 1854. In 1857 Ferguson was indentured as an apprentice blacksmith to John Price of Ballarat.

== Businesses ==
Around 1874 Ferguson established a business in Melbourne as an iron foundry and rail construction contractor. After successfully building a bridge over the Yarra River he was awarded many other government contracts. His company built twenty bridges along the north-eastern railway and another eight for the Clifton Hill line. Ferguson supplied 1,300 tonnes (2.9 million pounds) of wrought iron and cast iron for the building of the Newport Workshops.

In 1885 the Government of Victoria decided to change the Melbourne water supply pipes from wrought iron to cast iron. Ferguson won the contracts to supply the new pipe. To enable this expansion he bought the Glasgow Iron works in West Melbourne. With the Carlton Foundry, Ferguson now employed over 300 people. He soon after established a new foundry in Footscray.

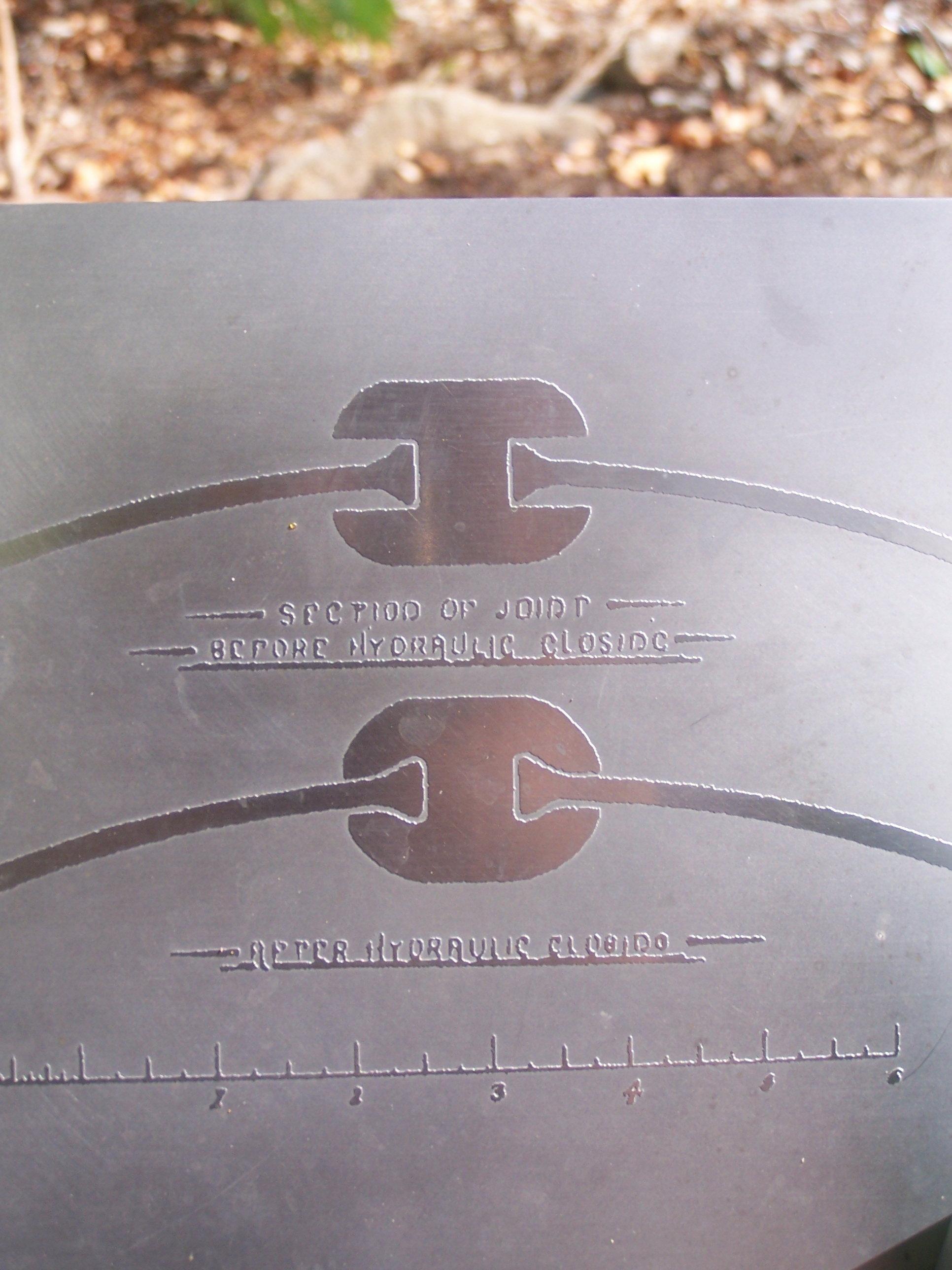
Plaque at Mundaring Weir, Western Australia showing Ferguson's rivetless joint

Ferguson gained international attention by winning the contract to supply 530 kilometres (330 mi) of 760-millimetre (30 in) steel main for the Goldfields Water Supply Scheme. The pipes used Ferguson's patented rivetless pipe or locking bar, the design of which improved the water flow. A stylised drawing of the design is now used to indicate places of interest along the pipeline.

To manufacture the pipe, Ferguson imported sheet steel from England and the United States then rolled these into the sections at foundries in Midland Junction and another he built in Maylands.

== Photographs ==
- Extensive collection at State Reference Library of Western Australia.

== See also ==
- Goldfields Water Supply Scheme
- Charles Hoskins
