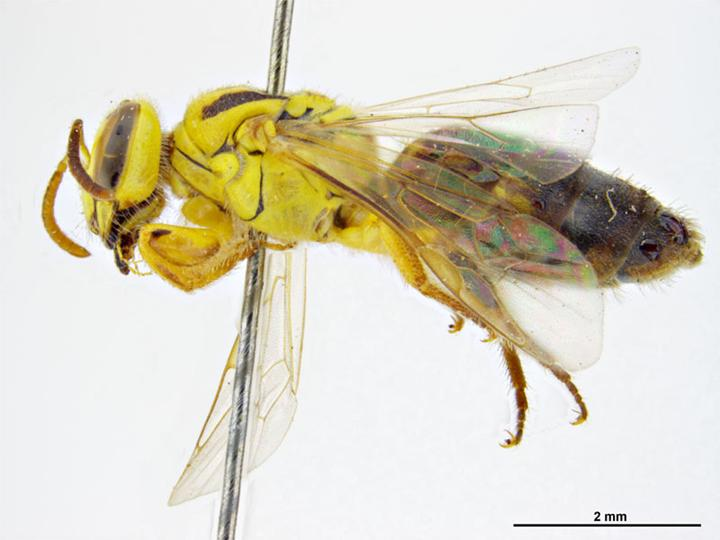
- Female

Scientific classification
- Kingdom: Animalia
- Phylum: Arthropoda
- Clade: Pancrustacea
- Class: Insecta
- Order: Hymenoptera
- Family: Colletidae
- Genus: Callohesma
- Species: C. ornatula

Binomial name
- Callohesma ornatula (Cockerell, 1929)

Synonyms
- Euryglossa flavopicta ornatula Cockerell, 1929

= Callohesma ornatula =

Species of bee

Callohesma ornatula is a species of bee in the family Colletidae and the subfamily Euryglossinae. It is endemic to Australia. It was described in 1929 by British-American entomologist Theodore Dru Alison Cockerell.

== Distribution and habitat ==
The species occurs in south-eastern Australia. The type locality is Brisbane in Queensland. Other published localities include Sydney and Lugarno in New South Wales, and Mount Yule, near Healesville in Victoria.

== Behaviour ==
The adults are flying mellivores. Flowering plants visited by the bees include Eucalyptus species.
