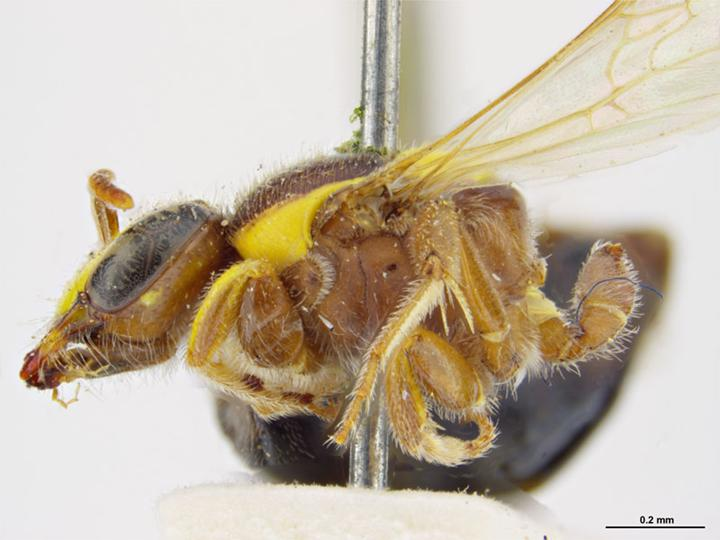
- Male

Scientific classification
- Kingdom: Animalia
- Phylum: Arthropoda
- Clade: Pancrustacea
- Class: Insecta
- Order: Hymenoptera
- Family: Colletidae
- Genus: Callohesma
- Species: C. rieki

Binomial name
- Callohesma rieki (Exley, 1974)

Synonyms
- Euryglossa (Callohesma) rieki Exley, 1974

= Callohesma rieki =

Species of bee

Callohesma rieki is a species of bee in the family Colletidae and the subfamily Euryglossinae. It is endemic to Australia. It was described in 1974 by Australian entomologist Elizabeth Exley.

== Distribution and habitat ==
The species occurs in south-eastern Australia. The type locality is Canberra in the Australian Capital Territory. It has also been recorded from Cotter River, as well as from Mount Yule near Healesville in Victoria.

== Behaviour ==
The adults are flying mellivores. Flowering plants visited by the bees include Eucalyptus species.
