= Callohesma picta =

Scientific classification
- Kingdom: Animalia
- Phylum: Arthropoda
- Clade: Pancrustacea
- Class: Insecta
- Order: Hymenoptera
- Family: Colletidae
- Genus: Callohesma
- Species: C. picta

Binomial name
- Callohesma picta (Smith, 1854)

Synonyms
- Allodape picta Smith, 1854

Species of bee

Callohesma picta is a species of bee in the family Colletidae and the subfamily Euryglossinae. It is endemic to Australia. It was described in 1854 by English entomologist Frederick Smith.

== Distribution and habitat ==
The species occurs in Australia, with no exact locality or further details given.

== Behaviour ==
The adults are flying mellivores.
