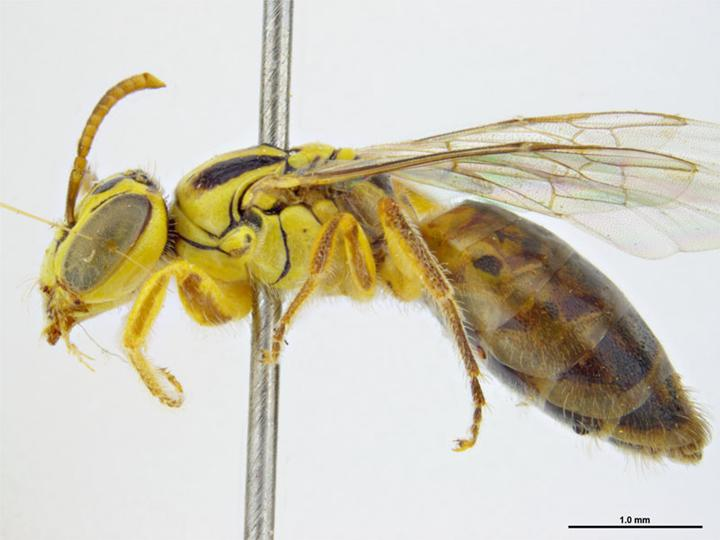
- Female

Scientific classification
- Kingdom: Animalia
- Phylum: Arthropoda
- Clade: Pancrustacea
- Class: Insecta
- Order: Hymenoptera
- Family: Colletidae
- Genus: Callohesma
- Species: C. recta

Binomial name
- Callohesma recta (Exley, 1974)

Synonyms
- Euryglossa (Callohesma) recta Exley, 1974

= Callohesma recta =

Species of bee

Callohesma recta is a species of bee in the family Colletidae and the subfamily Euryglossinae. It is endemic to Australia. It was described in 1974 by Australian entomologist Elizabeth Exley.

== Distribution and habitat ==
The species occurs across southern inland Australia. The type locality is 11 km west of Coolgardie, Western Australia. It has also been recorded from Spargoville and Gnowangerup, as well as from New South Wales.

== Behaviour ==
The adults are flying mellivores. Flowering plants visited by the bees include Eucalyptus species.
