= Richard G. Hartley =

Australian mining and engineering historian

Richard Gordon Hartley (30 June 1939 – 2016) was an Australian civil engineer, and a historian of the mining and engineering industry.

Harley was born in the United Kingdom. He attained an honours degree from Murdoch University in 1992, with studies focusing on gold mining in the early twentieth century Goldfields of Western Australia. Continuing his examination of developments in this technology, he obtained a PhD from Murdoch in 1998.

His work on the Goldfields Water Supply Scheme and Mundaring Weir was published in 2007, the centenary of the scheme. It has been the most thorough work completed on the scheme, involving extensive archival research and extensive interviews.

Hartley died in Perth, Western Australia in 2016.

== Mining heritage membership and awards ==
- 1992–2009 Member, Engineering Heritage Panel, Western Australian Branch, Engineers Australia
- 1995 Founding Member, Australasian Mining History Association
- 2009 John Monash Medal, Engineering Heritage Australia
- 2011 Telford Premium Prize, Institution of Civil Engineers, United Kingdom

== Selected works ==
- Cumming, Denis A. and Hartley, Richard G., Westralian founders of twentieth century mining: career biographies of mining engineers, mine managers and metallurgists who worked in the Western Australian mining industry 1890-1920, Richard G. Hartley, Rossmoyne W.A., 2014.
- Hartley, Richard G., River of steel: a history of Western Australian goldfields and agricultural water supply, 1903 - 2003, Access Press, Bassendean, W.A., 2007.
- Hartley, Richard G., "Fernie, Norman (1898-1977) Engineer", in John Ritchie (ed.), Australian Dictionary of Biography, vol. 14, Melbourne University Press, Melbourne, 1996, pp. 155–156.
- Hartley, Richard G., A history of technological change in Kalgoorlie gold metallurgy between 1895 and 1915, PhD thesis, Murdoch University, 1998, 2 v.
