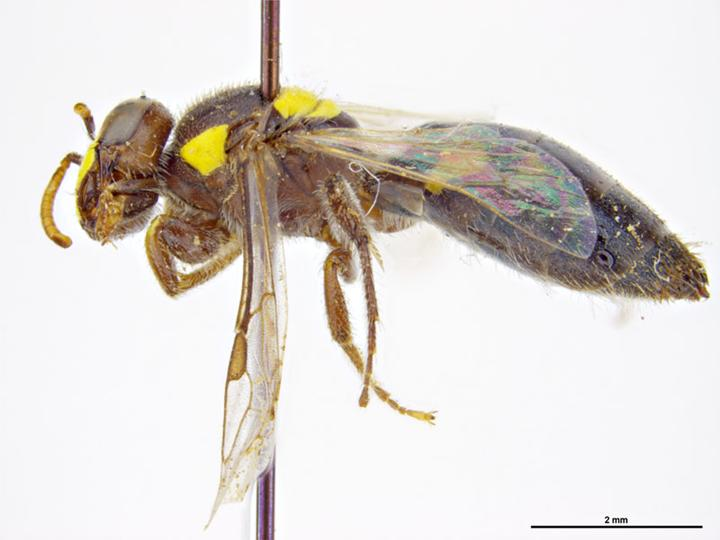
- Female

Scientific classification
- Kingdom: Animalia
- Phylum: Arthropoda
- Clade: Pancrustacea
- Class: Insecta
- Order: Hymenoptera
- Family: Colletidae
- Genus: Callohesma
- Species: C. quadrimaculata

Binomial name
- Callohesma quadrimaculata (Smith, 1879)

Synonyms
- Euryglossa quadrimaculata Smith, 1879

= Callohesma quadrimaculata =

Species of bee

Callohesma quadrimaculata is a species of bee in the family Colletidae and the subfamily Euryglossinae. It is endemic to Australia. It was described in 1879 by English entomologist Frederick Smith.

== Distribution and habitat ==
The species occurs in south-east Queensland. The type locality is Helidon, in the Lockyer Valley.

== Behaviour ==
The adults are flying mellivores. Flowering plants visited by the bees include Angophora species.

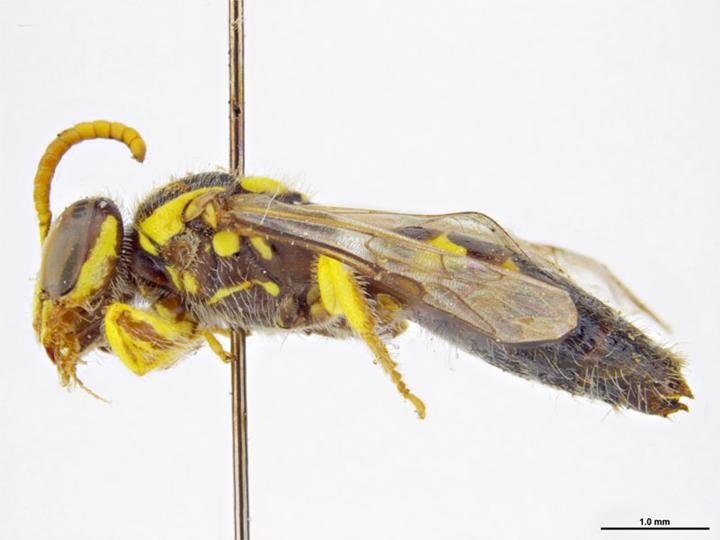
Male
