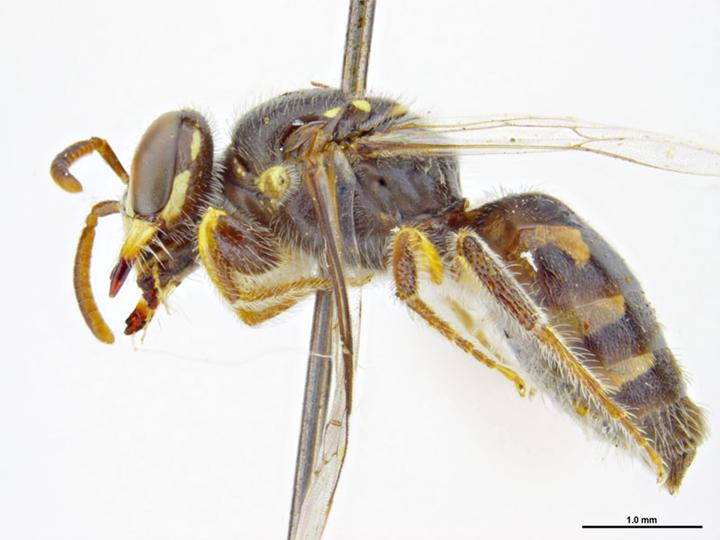
- Female

Scientific classification
- Kingdom: Animalia
- Phylum: Arthropoda
- Clade: Pancrustacea
- Class: Insecta
- Order: Hymenoptera
- Family: Colletidae
- Genus: Callohesma
- Species: C. campbelli

Binomial name
- Callohesma campbelli (Cockerell, 1929)

Synonyms
- Euryglossa campbelli Cockerell, 1929

= Callohesma campbelli =

Species of bee

Callohesma campbelli is a species of bee in the family Colletidae and the subfamily Euryglossinae. It is endemic to Australia. It was described in 1929 by British-American entomologist Theodore Dru Alison Cockerell.

== Description ==
The female holotype has a body length of 7 mm. It is mainly black, with some yellow markings.

== Distribution and habitat ==
The species occurs in Far North Queensland. The type locality is Almaden.

== Behaviour ==
The adults are flying mellivores.
