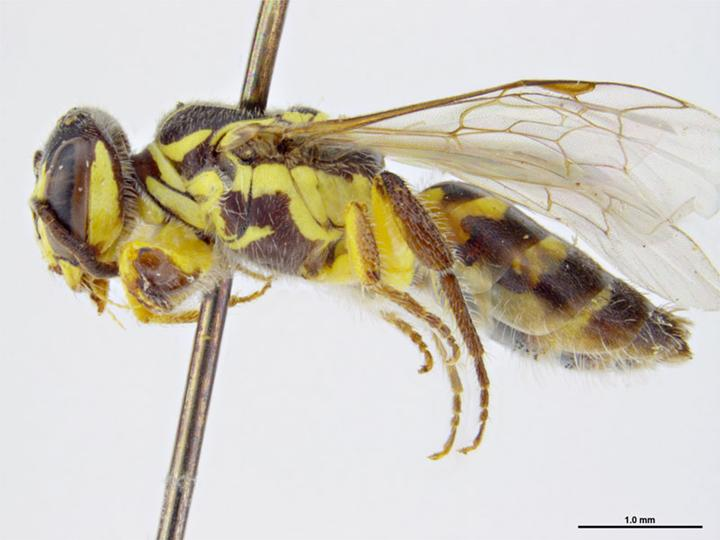
- Female

Scientific classification
- Kingdom: Animalia
- Phylum: Arthropoda
- Clade: Pancrustacea
- Class: Insecta
- Order: Hymenoptera
- Family: Colletidae
- Genus: Callohesma
- Species: C. calliopsella

Binomial name
- Callohesma calliopsella (Cockerell, 1910)

Synonyms
- Euryglossa calliopsella Cockerell, 1910

= Callohesma calliopsella =

Species of bee

Callohesma calliopsella is a species of bee in the family Colletidae and the subfamily Euryglossinae. It is endemic to Australia. It was described in 1910 by British-American entomologist Theodore Dru Alison Cockerell.

== Distribution and habitat ==
The species occurs in eastern mainland Australia. The type locality of the lectotype is Victoria.

== Behaviour ==
The adults are flying mellivores. Flowering plants visited by the bees include Angophora, Eucalyptus and Leptospermum species.

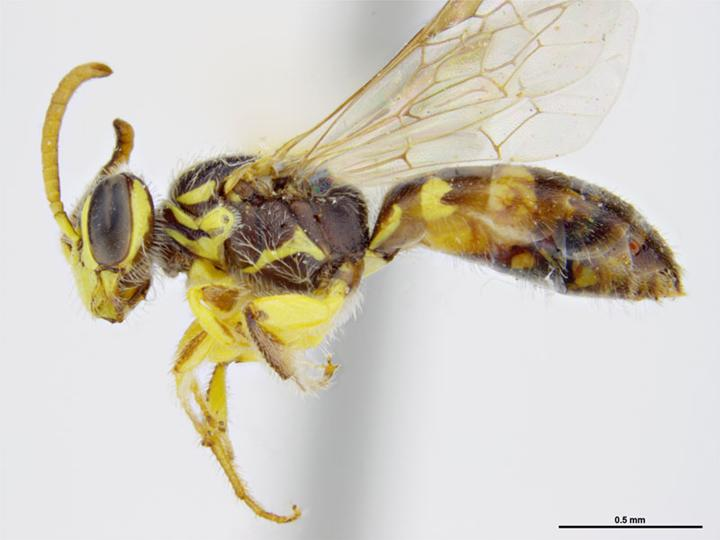
Male
