= Goldfields Water Supply Scheme =

Pipeline and dam project in Western Australia

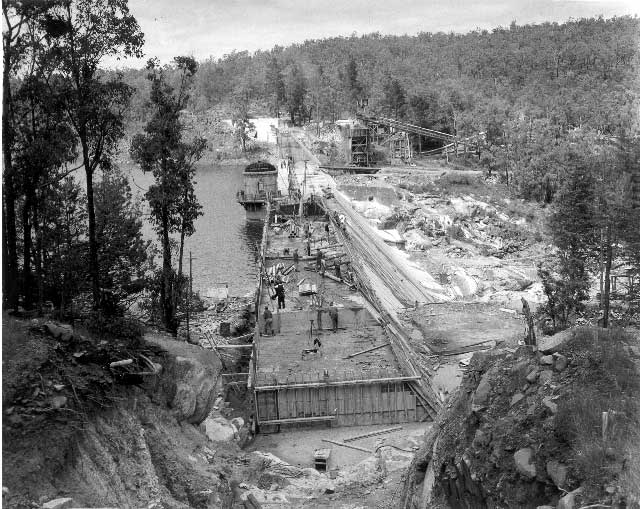
Mundaring Weir nearing completion, c. 1901

The Goldfields Water Supply Scheme (Note: Also known as the Coolgardie Water Scheme in early documents and news reports) is a pipeline and dam project that delivers potable water from Mundaring Weir in Perth to communities in Western Australia's Eastern Goldfields, particularly Coolgardie and Kalgoorlie. The project was commissioned in 1896 and completed in 1903.

The pipeline continues to operate today, supplying water to over 100,000 people in over 33,000 households as well as mines, farms and other enterprises.

== Water scarcity ==
During the early 1890s, thousands of settlers had travelled into the barren and dry desert centre of Western Australia seeking gold, but the existing infrastructure for the supply of water was non-existent, and an urgent need arose.

Prior to the scheme, water condensers, irregular rain, and water trains were the sources. Railway dams were essential for water to supply steam locomotives.

== Origins of the scheme ==
Throughout the 1890s, water availability issues in Coolgardie and in the Kalgoorlie-Boulder region were causing concern. On 16 July 1896, the Premier of Western Australia, John Forrest introduced to Western Australian Parliament a bill to authorise the raising of a loan of £2.5 million, equivalent to A$448.7 million in 2022, to construct the scheme: the pipeline would convey 23,000 kilolitres (6.1 million US gallons) of water per day to the Goldfields from a dam on the Helena River near Mundaring in Perth.

The scheme consisted of three key elements – the Mundaring Weir, which dammed the Helena River in the Darling Scarp creating the Helena River Reservoir; a 760-millimetre (30 in) diameter steel pipe which ran from the dam to Kalgoorlie 530 kilometres (330 mi) away; and a series of eight pumping stations and two small holding dams to control pressures and to lift the water over the Darling Scarp.

== Construction and criticism ==
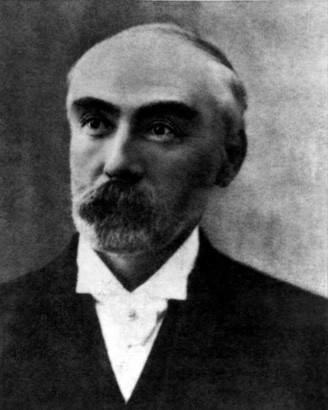
C. Y. O'Connor, c. 1890s

The scheme was devised by C. Y. O'Connor who oversaw its design and most of the construction project. Although supported by Premier Forrest, O'Connor had to deal with widespread criticism and derision from members of the Western Australian Parliament as well as the local press based on a belief that the scope of the engineering task was too great and that it would never work.

There was also a concern that the gold deposits would soon be depleted, and the state would have a significant debt to repay but little or no commerce to support it.

Sunday Times editor Frederick Vosper – who was also a politician, ran a personal attack on O'Connor's integrity and ability through the paper. Timing was critical, Forrest as a supporter had moved into Federal politics, and the new Premier George Leake had long been an opponent of the scheme.

O'Connor died by suicide in March 1902, less than 12 months before the final commissioning of the pipeline.

Lady Forrest officially started the pumping machinery at Pumping Station Number One (Mundaring) on 22 January, and on 24 January 1903 water flowed into the Mount Charlotte Reservoir at Kalgoorlie. O'Connor's engineer-in-chief, C. S. R. Palmer took over the project after his death, seeing it through to its successful completion.

The government conducted an inquiry into the scheme and found no basis for the press accusations of corruption or misdemeanours on the part of O'Connor.

== Pipeline ==
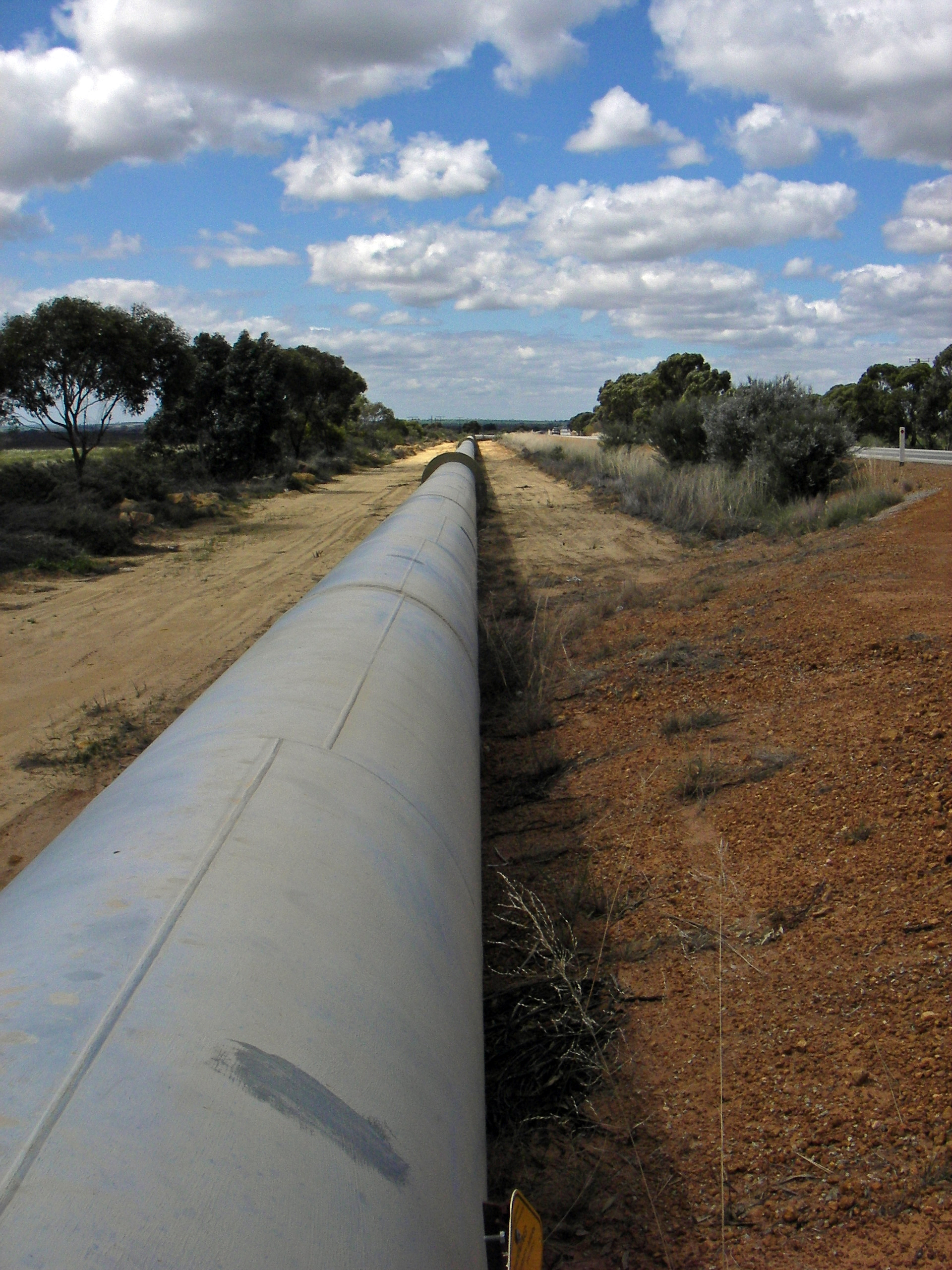
A section of the pipeline

The pipes were manufactured locally from flat steel sheets imported from Germany and the United States. Mephan Ferguson was awarded the first manufacturing contract and built a fabrication plant at Falkirk (now known as the Perth suburb of Maylands) to produce half of the 60,000 pipes required. C & G Hoskins established a factory near Midland Junction (now known simply as Midland) to produce the other half.

When built, the pipeline was the longest fresh-water pipeline in the world.

The pipeline ran alongside the earlier route of the Eastern Railway and the Eastern Goldfields Railways for parts of its route, so that the railway service and the pipeline had an interdependence through the sparsely populated region between Southern Cross and Kalgoorlie.

The scheme required significant infrastructure in power generation to support the pumping stations. Communities oriented to the maintenance of the pipeline and pumping stations grew up along the route. With improved power supplies and modern machinery and automation, the scheme now has more unattended pumping stations operated by fewer people.

== Dam ==
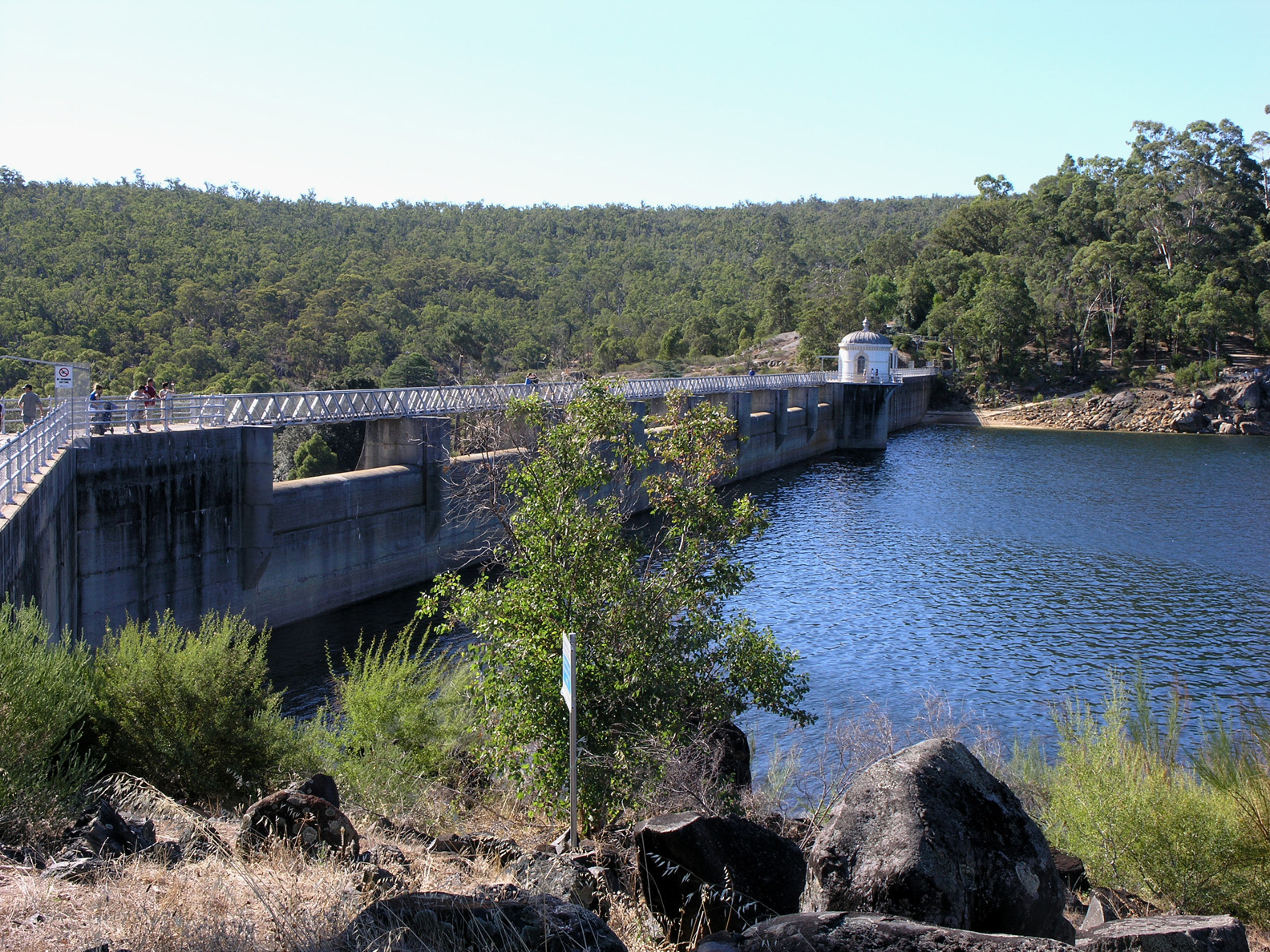
Mundaring Weir today

Construction of the dam started in 1898. When completed in 1902 it was claimed to be the highest overflow dam in the world.

Shortly after World War II, raising the wall was proposed and by 1951 the height of the dam wall was increased by 9.7 metres (32 ft).

== Mundaring Weir branch railway ==
The Public Works Department originally constructed and ran the railway from the Mundaring railway station for the purpose of delivering materials to the construction site.

The Western Australian Government Railways took over the railway operation. It ceased operation in 1952, and the connecting railway line at Mundaring closed in 1954.

== Design challenges ==
- The sudden Darling Range height rise between Mundaring and Northam required the location of Pumping Station number two to be close to number one.
- The Avon River in Northam required the construction of the Poole Street Bridge after failure of river bed pipes in 1917.

The distance was compounded by the height the water had to be lifted. To rise the almost 400 metres (1,300 ft) in altitude, issues with friction meant that a head of 800 metres (2,600 ft) had to be achieved. O'Connor had eight pumping stations that each pumped the water to the next of the receiving tanks in his plans.

Leakages were noted early; by the early 1930s, 1.7 gigalitres (450 million US gallons) of water per year – a quarter of the total volume of water being pumped from Mundaring Weir – was leaking from the pipeline.

== Pumping stations ==
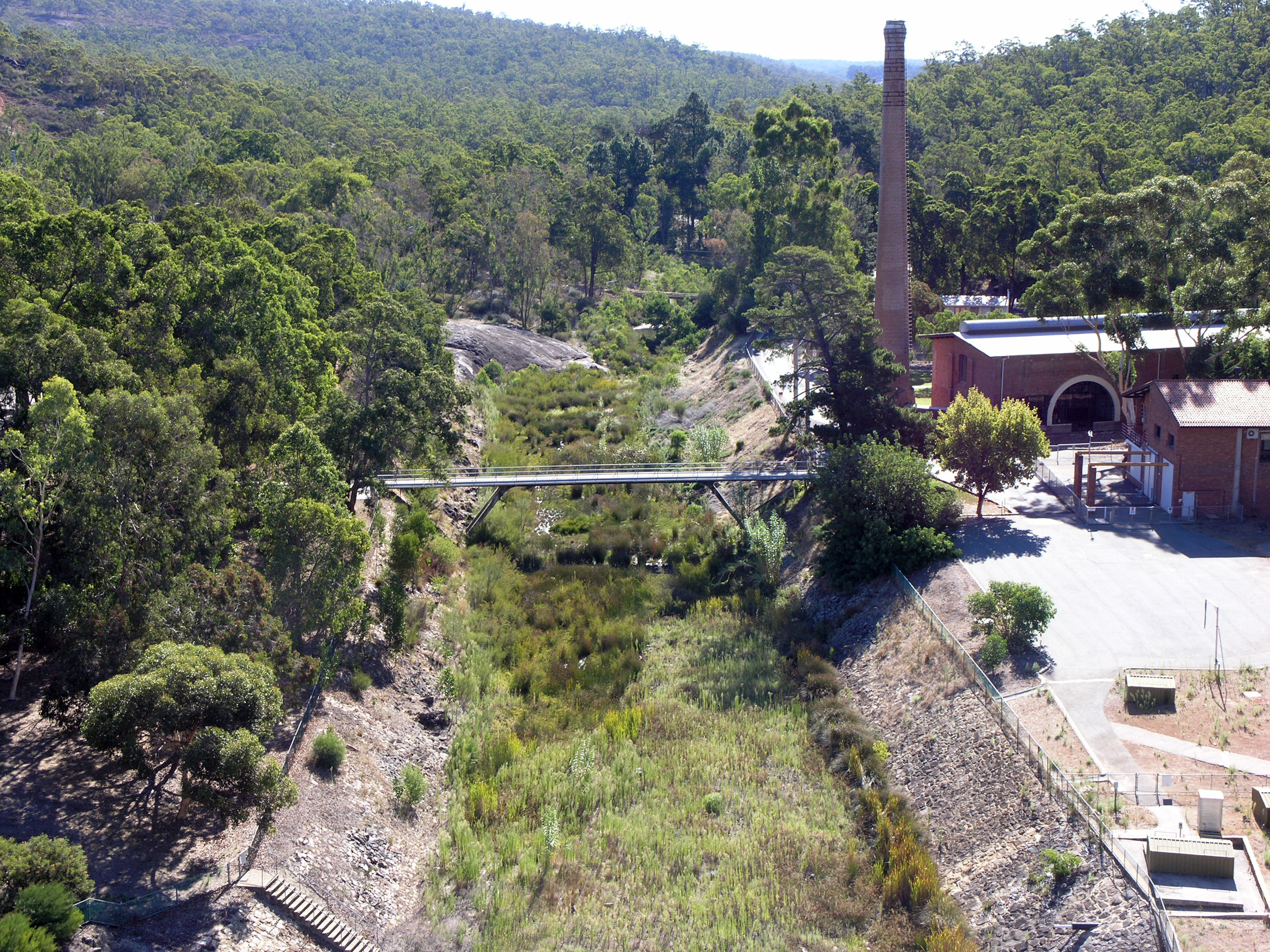
Original pumping station at Mundaring Weir.

With most of the original stations being steam-driven, a ready supply of timber was needed to fire the boilers. Hence the pipeline route was closely aligned with the Eastern Railway. To enhance the reliability of the system, each pumping station was designed and constructed with a spare pumping unit. Due to pressure requirements related to the slope of the pipeline, stations one to four required two pumping units to be in operation. Stations five to eight only required one operating pump, due to a lower rise in height between those stations.

James Simpson and Co supplied 3,500 tonnes (7.7 million pounds) of equipment in 5,000 separate boxes for the construction of the pumping sets.

=== Original pumping stations ===
All the original pumping stations were powered by steam.

- Number One – below Mundaring Weir (now a National Trust of Western Australia administered museum)
- Number Two – above Mundaring Weir (demolished in 1960s)
- Number Three – Cunderdin (now Cunderdin Museum)
- Number Four – Merredin (location of three generations of pump station)
- Number Five – Yerbillon
- Number Six – Ghouli
- Number Seven – Gilgai
- Number Eight – Dedari

=== Current pumping stations ===
1. Mundaring
2. Chidlow
3. Wundowie
4. Grass Valley
5. Meckering
6. Cunderdin
7. Kellerberrin
8. Baandee
9. Merredin
10. Walgoolan
11. Yerbillon
12. Nulla Nulla
13. Southern Cross
14. Ghooli
15. Karalee
16. Koorarawalyee
17. Boondi
18. Dedari
19. Bullabulling
20. Kalgoorlie

Branch mains, or extensions, were started as early as 1907.

Water from the pipeline was utilised for a number of country towns adjacent to its route, and also into the Great Southern region. The Public Works Department started this project in the 1950s following the raising of the weir wall in the early 1950s and it completed this work in 1961.

== Centenary ==
The scheme was "interpreted" by the National Trust of Western Australia in its Golden Pipeline Project, which created guide books, web sites, and tourist trails along the scheme pipeline and tracing the older power station locations and communities that serviced the scheme. The Trust achieved the responsibility in an agreement with the Water Corporation in 1998. Most of the material was developed between 2001 and 2003.

== Recent histories ==
In 2007 two items were produced that were overviews of the scheme:

=== Pipe Dreams ===
The history of the construction of the Goldfields Water Supply Scheme was detailed in the 2007 documentary Pipe Dreams, which was part of the ABC series Constructing Australia.

=== River of Steel ===
The book River of Steel, by Richard G. Hartley, won the Margaret Medcalf award of the State Records Office of Western Australia in 2008.

== Lower Helena Dam ==
Lower Helena Pipehead Dam is now also used to supply water to the Goldfields region. Water from the dam is currently pumped back into Mundaring Weir.

== Engineering heritage ==
The scheme is listed as a National Engineering Landmark by Engineers Australia as part of its Engineering Heritage Recognition Program, and an International Historic Civil Engineering Landmark by the American Society of Civil Engineers.

== See also ==
- Pipeline transport
- Railway dams and reservoirs of Western Australia

== Sources ==
Note – the material on the scheme is in its entirety a significant collection, and although the Water Authority might hold a comprehensive bibliography, it has not been published.

Primary sources

- Articles in The Golden Age relating to the water supply at Coolgardie 1894–1898. J S Battye Library
- Coolgardie Goldfields Water Supply : a new method of dealing with granite rocks.1894. West Australian, 10 Feb 1894.
- The Agricultural areas, Great Southern towns and Goldfields water supply scheme : constructed by the Public Works Department, Western Australia, completed November 1961 : form of proceedings at the function to commemorate the completion of the project, held at Mundaring Weir, on 24 November 1961 [Perth, W.A.] : Govt. Printer, 1961.

Secondary sources

- Hartley, Richard G. (2007) River of steel : a history of the Western Australian Goldfields and Agricultural Water Supply 1895–2003 Bassendean, W.A. : Access Press. ISBN 978-0-86445-196-5 (pbk.)
- National Trust of Western Australia (2002). The golden pipeline heritage trail guide: a time capsule of water, gold and Western Australia. West Perth, W.A.: The Trust. ISBN 1-876507-25-X.

Pamphlets

- The Politics of the Goldfields Water Supply Scheme, The Golden Pipeline Information Sheet Number 1. National Trust of Australia (Western Australia) No Date.

Further reading

- Le Page, J. S. H. (1986) Building a state : the story of the Public Works Department of Western Australia 1829–1985 Leederville, W.A: Water Authority of Western Australia. ISBN 0-7244-6862-5
