= Ghouli, Western Australia =

Locality in Western Australia

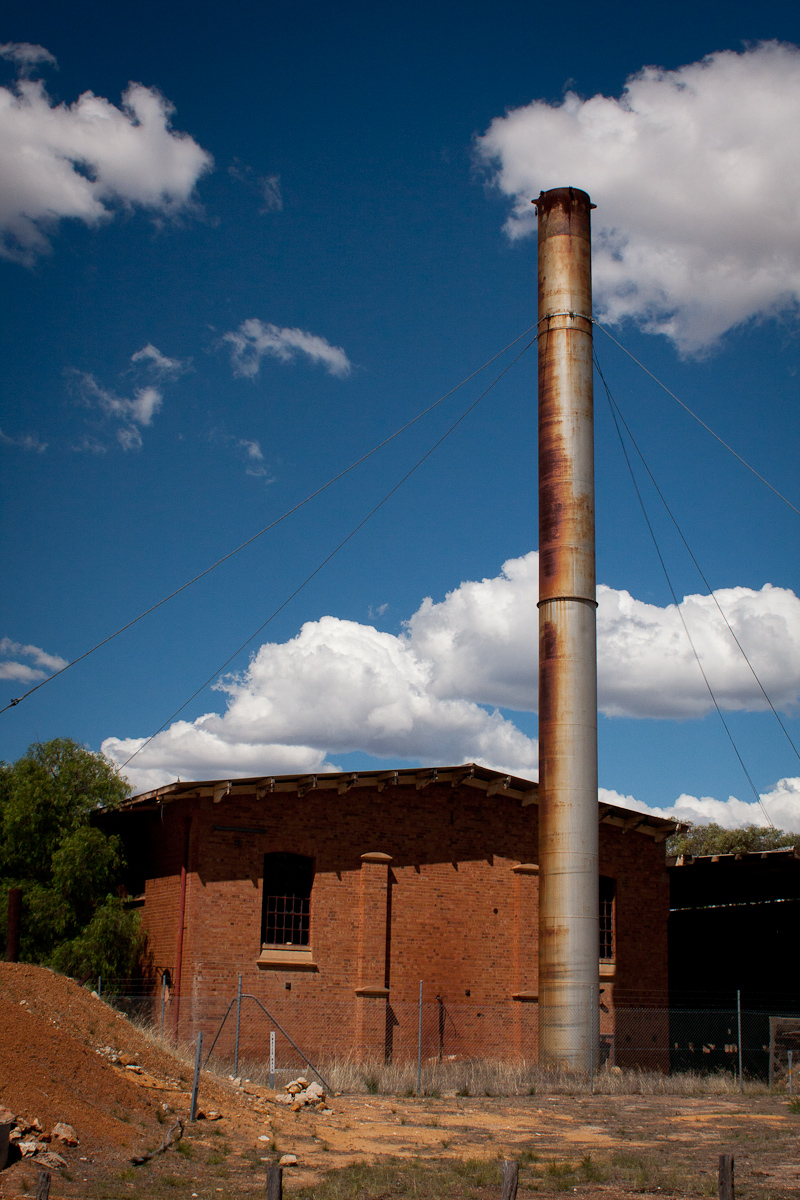
The State heritage listed No. 6 Steam Pumping Station in 2011

Ghouli, Western Australia (also spelled Ghooli) was the location of Number 6 Pumping station on the Goldfields Water Supply Scheme, and is the location of the current pumping station number 14 on the pipeline.

It was also located on the Eastern Goldfields Railway, not far from Southern Cross.

It was located between number 5 pumping station located at Yerbillon, and number 7 at Gilgai.
