= Josephine Cardale =

Australian entomologist

- Education: University of Queensland
- Scientific career
- Fields: Entomology
- Workplaces: CSIRO, Australian National Insect Collection
- Thesis: The biology of amegilla friese (hymenoptera, apoidea)

Josephine Christina Cardale worked as an entomologist for CSIRO from 1967 to 2001. She was a collection manager of Hymenoptera at the Australian National Insect Collection.

== Career ==
Prior to working for CSIRO, her Master of Science thesis at University of Queensland focused on The biology of amegilla friese (hymenoptera, apoidea). Her thesis focused on describing the females of Amegilla (Amegilla) pulchra (Smith) at nesting sites in Brisbane, Queensland. It also discusses four parasites from A. pulchra cells, and the behaviour of females of Amegilla (Asarapoda) sp. at a nesting site in Brisbane.

During her work at CSIRO, she took part in the pre-wet survey for insects which may indicate environmental pollution at McArthur River, Northern Territory (October–November 1975). The survey was contracted by Mimets Development Pty.Ltd., a subsidiary of Mt Isa Mines. The resulting "Report on a survey of the Insects of the McArthur River Area, NT" recommended insect populations for monitoring effects of water pollution.

Cardale was also part of an intensive collecting trip to the Iron Range area of Cape York, Queensland (June–July 1986), which garnered 50,000 specimens (Upton, p. 240). She was also in the team which recorded some insects in Australia for the first time during a trip to Kununurra (Mitchell Plateau, Western Australia, May 1983) (Upton, pp. 243–4).

She was credited with working with Dr John Lawrence in collecting most of the specimens of Psocoptera from Christmas Island, Indian Ocean.

Cardale's volume of the Zoological Catalogue of Australia was reviewed by C.D. Eardley as "...indispensable to anyone interested in Australian bees or pollination biology."

== Namesakes ==
The parasitoid wasp species Ondontacolus cardaleae Valerio & Austin, sp. n. was named after Cardale, who collected the species.

She is also the namesake of another parasitoid wasp species which she collected, Ophelosia josephinae sp.n. and a cuckoo wasp, Primeuchroeus cardaleae Bohart.

She is also the namesake of a further parasitoid Ichneumon wasp 'Denticeria cardaleae,' which she collected. sp.n

== Publications ==
- Cardale, J. (1968), Immature stages of Australian Anthophorinae (Hymenoptera: Apoidea). Australian Journal of Entomology, 7: 35–41. doi:10.1111/j.1440-6055.1968.tb00698.x
- W.W.K. Houston & G.V.Maynard (eds). Cardale, J.C. (author). Zoological Catalogue of Australia. Vol. 10. Hymenoptera: Apoidea. Australian Government Publishing Service, Canberra, 1993. ix + 406 pp. ISBN 0 644290803

== Awards ==
Cardale was highly commended in the Australian Society of Indexers Medal Award (1992) for her index to Insects of Australia: A Textbook for Students and Research Workers.
