= Dedari, Western Australia =

Location in Western Australia

Dedari, Western Australia was the location of Number 8 Pumping station on the Goldfields Water Supply Scheme

It was also located on the Eastern Goldfields Railway.

It was located between number 7 pumping station located at Ghouli, and Mount Charlotte reservoir in Kalgoorlie.
