= Division of Hasluck =

Australian federal electoral division

Coordinates: 31.997°S 116.008°E

Hasluck Australian House of Representatives Division
- Interactive map of electorate boundaries from the 2025 federal election
- Created: 2001
- MP: Tania Lawrence
- Party: Labor
- Namesake: Sir Paul Hasluck and Dame Alexandra Hasluck
- Electors: 117,642 (2022)
- Area: 1,192 km^{2} (460.2 sq mi)
- Demographic: Outer metropolitan
Electorates around Hasluck:
Pearce	Durack	Bullwinkel
Cowan	Hasluck	Bullwinkel
Perth	Swan	Bullwinkel

The Division of Hasluck is an electoral division of the Australian House of Representatives, located in Western Australia.

== History ==
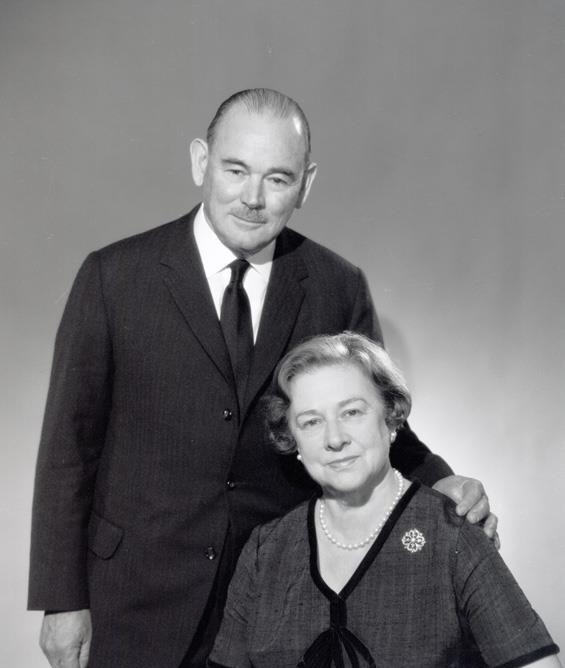
Paul Hasluck and Alexandra Hasluck, the division's namesakes

The division was proclaimed at a redistribution of Western Australia's electoral divisions on 20 November 2000, and first contested at the 2001 federal election. The eponyms of the division are Paul Hasluck, the member for the Division of Curtin in the House of Representatives from 1949 to 1969 and subsequently the Governor-General of Australia from 1969 to 1974, and his wife, Alexandra Hasluck, an author.

Hasluck has been a marginal seat and changed hands between the Labor Party and Liberal Party at the first four elections it was contested. At the 2013 federal election there was a swing towards the incumbent Liberal member Ken Wyatt, breaking this pattern. Wyatt was the first Indigenous Australian member of the House of Representatives. Wyatt was reelected in 2016, and in 2019. However, in 2022, amid a 10.55 swing to Labor on the two-party-preferred vote in Western Australia, Wyatt suffered a similar 12-point swing to go down to defeat against the ALP's Tania Lawrence. Three years later, Lawrence was reelected with another 6-point swing to her, rendering the seat technically safe for Labor.

== Geography ==
Federal electoral division boundaries in Australia are determined at redistributions by a redistribution committee appointed by the Australian Electoral Commission. Redistributions occur for the boundaries of divisions in a particular state, and they occur every seven years, or sooner if a state's representation entitlement changes or when divisions of a state are malapportioned.

From its creation at the 2001 election to the 2013 election, the Division of Hasluck was a north–south arc across Perth's eastern suburbs from Southern River/Gosnells (in the City of Gosnells) in the south to Caversham/Midland (in the City of Swan) in the north. It also incorporated the more urbanised western parts of what was then the Shire of Kalamunda, such as Forrestfield and Kalamunda, and the Shire of Mundaring.

In the redistribution prior to the 2016 election, the Division of Hasluck ceded its portion of the City of Gosnells south of the Canning River to the newly created Division of Burt and the suburb of High Wycombe to the Division of Swan, among other changes. In turn, it gained most of the less urbanised areas of what was then the Shire of Kalamunda, the remainder of the Shire of Mundaring and further territory in the City of Swan from the Division of Pearce. As a result of adding in more rural and semi-rural areas, the area of the Division of Hasluck increased from 245 square kilometres (95 sq mi) to 1,192 square kilometres (460 sq mi).

In August 2021, the Australian Electoral Commission (AEC) announced a number of changes to the boundaries of Hasluck. The Gosnells suburbs of Beckenham, Kenwick and Maddington, along with the seat's portion of Gosnells, were transferred to the electorate of Canning, thus removing the City of Gosnells from Hasluck entirely. In addition, the Kalamunda suburbs of Maida Vale and Wattle Grove, along with the seat's portion of Forrestfield, were transferred to the electorate of Swan. Hasluck consequently gained a large portion of the City of Swan from the seat of Pearce, including the suburbs of Aveley, Baskerville, Belhus, Brabham, Brigadoon, Dayton, Ellenbrook, Henley Brook, Herne Hill, Millendon, The Vines, Upper Swan, West Swan and Whiteman, a portion of Lexia, and the remainder of Middle Swan and Red Hill, also gaining the suburb of Bennett Springs from the seat of Cowan. These boundary changes took place as of the 2022 election.

On its current (2022) boundaries, the Division of Hasluck includes the following suburbs:

City of Swan
- Aveley
- Baskerville
- Belhus
- Bellevue
- Bennett Springs
- Brabham
- Brigadoon
- Bushmead
- Caversham
- Dayton
- Ellenbrook
- Gidgegannup
- Guildford
- Hazelmere
- Henley Brook
- Herne Hill
- Jane Brook
- Koongamia
- Middle Swan
- Midland
- Millendon
- Red Hill
- South Guildford*
- Stratton
- The Vines
- Upper Swan
- Viveash
- Woodbridge
- West Swan
- Whiteman
Shire of Mundaring
- Bailup
- Bellevue
- Beechina
- Boya
- Chidlow
- Darlington
- Glen Forrest
- Gorrie
- Greenmount
- Helena Valley
- Hovea
- Mahogany Creek
- Malmalling
- Midvale
- Mount Helena
- Mundaring
- Mundaring Weir
- Parkerville
- Sawyers Valley
- Stoneville
- Swan View
- The Lakes
- Wooroloo
City of Kalamunda
- Bickley
- Gooseberry Hill
- Hacketts Gully
- Kalamunda
- Lesmurdie
- Paulls Valley
- Piesse Brook
- Reservoir
- Walliston

* Split between Hasluck and Swan.

== Members ==
Image	Member	Party	Term	Notes
	Sharryn Jackson (1962–)	Labor	10 November 2001 – 9 October 2004	Lost seat
	Stuart Henry (1946–)	Liberal	9 October 2004 – 24 November 2007	Lost seat
	Sharryn Jackson (1962–)	Labor	24 November 2007 – 21 August 2010	Lost seat
	Ken Wyatt (1952–)	Liberal	21 August 2010 – 21 May 2022	First Aboriginal Member of Parliament. Served as minister under Turnbull and Morrison. Lost seat
	Tania Lawrence (1973–)	Labor	21 May 2022 – present	Incumbent

== Election results ==
2025 Australian federal election: Hasluck
Party	Candidate	Votes	%	±%
Labor	Tania Lawrence	46,203	48.35	+4.71
Liberal	David Goode	21,173	22.16	−7.99
Greens	Tamica Matson	11,912	12.47	+1.04
One Nation	Adrian Deeth	7,050	7.38	+3.88
Legalise Cannabis	Leo Treasure	4,842	5.07	+5.07
Christians	David Kingston	2,862	3.00	+2.30
Great Australian	Dawn Kelly	1,509	1.58	+1.47
Total formal votes		95,551	96.00	+2.35
Informal votes		3,978	4.00	−2.35
Turnout		99,529	87.88	+4.86
Two-party-preferred result
Labor	Tania Lawrence	63,039	65.97	+5.93
Liberal	David Goode	32,512	34.03	−5.93
Labor hold		Swing	+5.93	
