= Toodyay Road =

Road in Western Australia

Coordinates: 31.730675°S 116.270358°E

Toodyay Road Western Australia
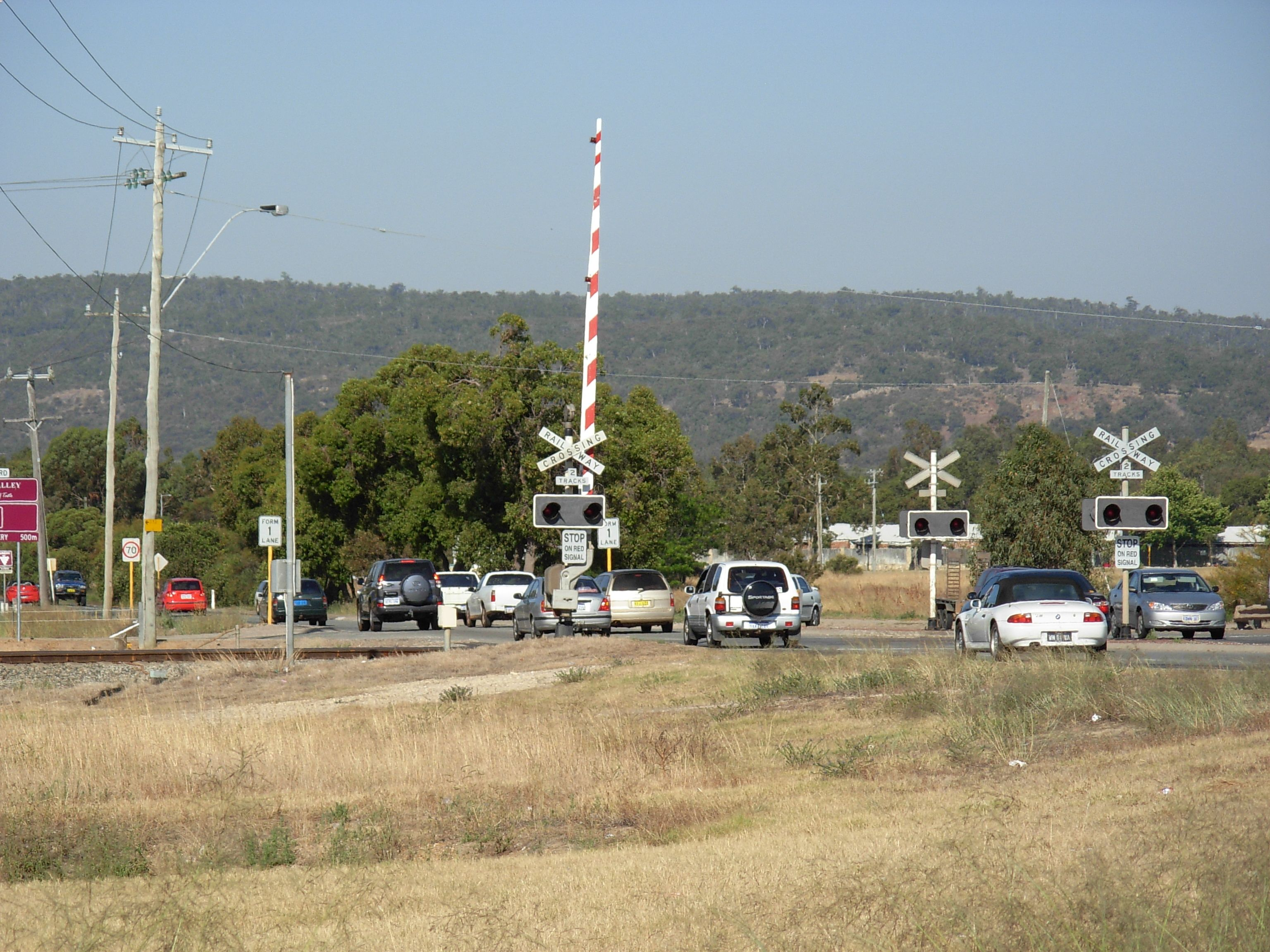
- Toodyay Road railway crossing, Middle Swan

General information
- Type: Road
- Length: 64 km (40 mi)
- Opened: 1838
- Route number(s): State Route 50

Major junctions
- Southwest end: Great Northern Highway (National Route 1), Middle Swan
- Roe Highway (National Highway 95 / State Route 3); Clackline-Toodyay Road; Northam-Toodyay Road (State Route 120)
- Northeast end: Goomalling-Toodyay Road, Toodyay

Location(s)
- Major suburbs: Red Hill, Gidgegannup

Toodyay Road is a mostly 2-lane undivided single carriageway in Western Australia, running from the north-eastern Perth suburb of Middle Swan, through Gidgegannup and Bailup, to the Wheatbelt town of Toodyay. It is signposted as State Route 50.

It rises up the Darling Scarp at Red Hill and travels through the easternmost section of the City of Swan.

== Route description ==
Travelling north-east along Toodyay Road into Toodyay

Toodyay Road travels in a north-easterly direction from Perth's north-east to Toodyay, via the following towns and localities:

- Middle Swan
- Stratton
- Jane Brook
- Red Hill
- Gidgegannup
- Bailup

== History ==
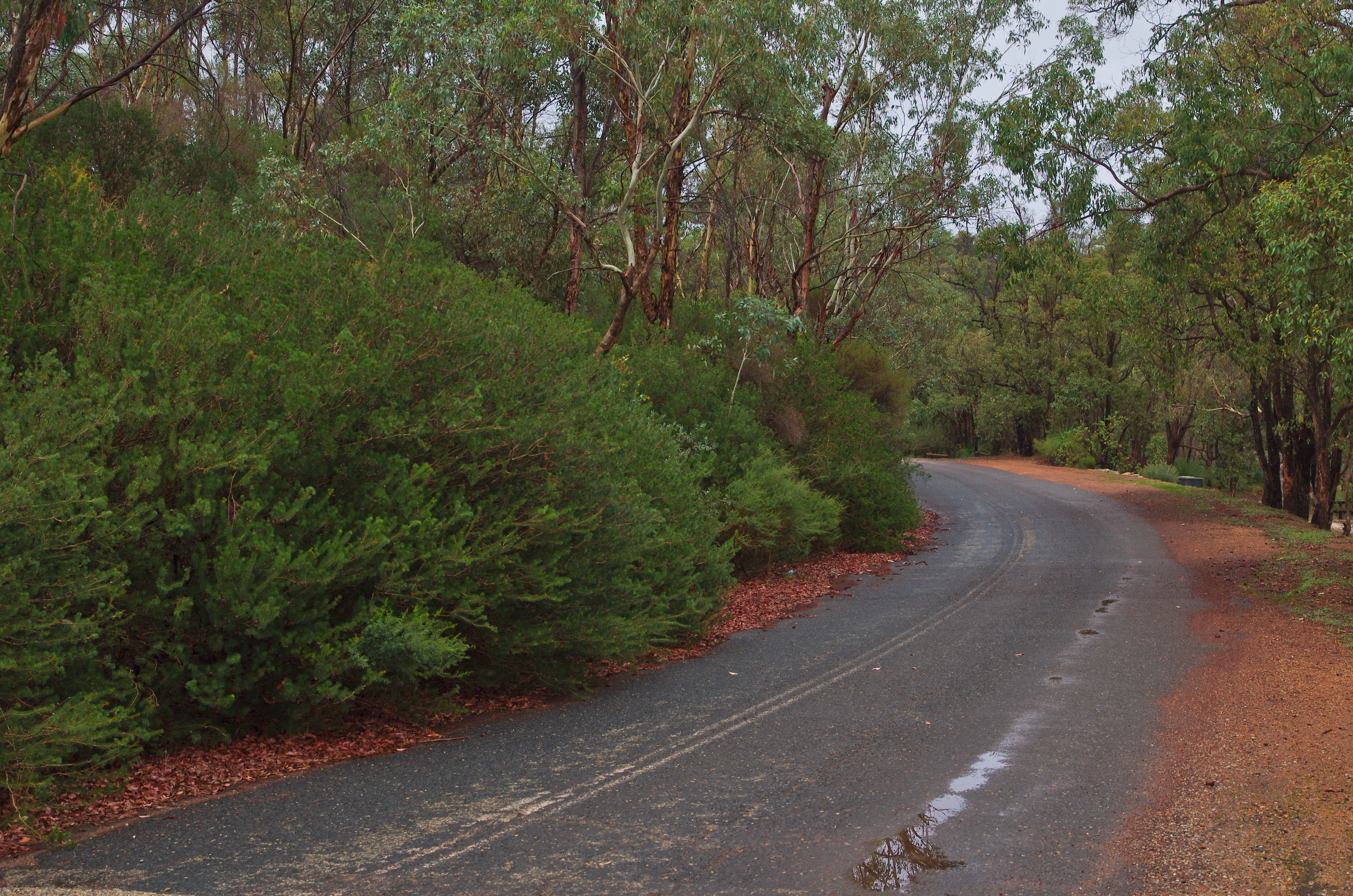
Remnant section of an earlier alignment near Noble Falls

A road to Toodyay has existed since at least 1838. Originally referred to as Newcastle Road the road's name was not officially recorded until 1932 when the Midland Junction Municipal Council was advise by the department of Lands and Surveys of a number of unnamed roads in its area. It was decided that it would be a good opportunity to rename the road to reflect the name change of Newcastle to Toodyay which had occurred in 1910.

From 1854, the Red Hill section of the route was the site of the Toodyay Red Hill Convict Road Station, built to house convict work crews associated with the road gangs that constructed and maintained the Perth–Toodyay road link.

== Future ==
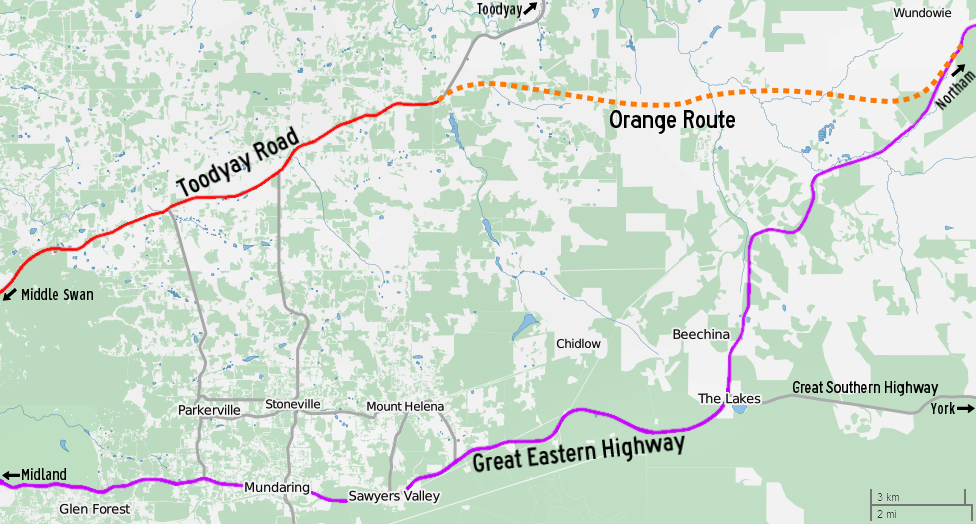
Future alignment of the Perth–Adelaide National Highway, along Toodyay Road (red) and the proposed Orange Route (dashed orange). The current alignment is along Great Eastern Highway (purple).

There are long-term plans to bypass Great Eastern Highway's current ascent of the Darling Scarp, using part of Toodyay Road. Planning for a new major road network in Perth's eastern corridor began in the 1970s. Early planning efforts between 1978 and 1981 for a new highway reservation from Mundaring to Wooroloo encountered community opposition, and the Environmental Protection Authority (EPA) requested a more detailed environmental assessment. In 1985, a study into the primary east–west traffic routes in the area was commissioned by the Main Roads Department, Metropolitan Region Planning Authority, (Note: Later known as the State Planning Commission, now the Western Australian Planning Commission) Shire of Mundaring, and Shire of Swan. It recommended a new alignment, known as the "Orange Route", be selected for the Perth to Adelaide National Highway. Alternative routes were identified using other colours as codenames. The new national highway would travel north-east along Toodyay Road from Roe Highway to beyond Gidgegannup, and then deviate east via the proposed Orange Route to meet Great Eastern Highway near Wundowie. The ultimate design of the highway includes grade separated interchanges for all of the roads that it intersects. The Orange Route received environmental approval on 22 November 1989. Detailed planning for the Clackline to Wooroloo section of the Orange Route was undertaken in 1998. As of June 2012, construction of the Orange Route is not a priority for Main Roads. The project was not in the forward works program, there was no indication of the expected starting date, and no recent cost analysis had been undertaken. Plans are still in development, but funding for the project is a federal government responsibility.

== Major intersections ==
LGA	Location	km	mi	Destinations	Notes
Swan	Middle Swan	0.0	0.0	Great Northern Highway (National Route 1) – Midland, Upper Swan, Bullsbrook	Western terminus at traffic light intersection. State Route 50 western terminus. Continues as Eveline Road to Swan District Hospital
Swan	Middle Swan	0.8	0.50	Lloyd Street – Midland	Traffic light intersection.
Swan	Middle Swan-Stratton boundary	1.8	1.1	Roe Highway (National Highway 95 / State Route 3) – Joondalup, Morley, Perth Airport, Fremantle	Traffic light intersection
Swan	Middle Swan-Jane Brook boundary	3.7	2.3	Talbot Road – Stratton, Swan View	
Swan	Gidgegannup	13.7– 13.8	8.5– 8.6	Roland Road southbound / O'Brien Road northbound – Brigadoon, Parkerville, Mahogany Creek	Staggered T-intersections
Swan	Gidgegannup	17.6	10.9	Stoneville Road – Stoneville, Mundaring	
Swan	Gidgegannup	21.2	13.2	Bunning Road – Mount Helena, Sawyers Valley	
Swan-Mundaring boundary	Gidgegannup-Bailup boundary	33.2	20.6	Bailup Road – Wooroloo, Wundowie	
Toodyay	Toodyay-Hoddys Well boundary	58.0	36.0	Clackline-Toodyay Road – Clackline	
Toodyay	Toodyay-Dumbarton boundary	62.4	38.8	Northam-Toodyay Road (State Route 120) – Northam	State Route 50 northern terminus
Toodyay	Toodyay	64.2	39.9	Goomalling-Toodyay Road – Goomalling	Northern terminus. Continues as Stirling Terrace
1.000 mi = 1.609 km; 1.000 km = 0.621 mi: Route transition; Note: Intersections with minor local roads are not shown
