= Great Eastern Highway =

Highway in Western Australia

Great Eastern Highway Western Australia
- Map of the south-west of Western Australia, with Great Eastern Highway highlighted in red

General information
- Type: Highway
- Length: 592.82 km (368 mi)
- Opened: 1860s
- Gazetted: 14 April 1938
- Route number(s): National Highway 94 (Victoria Park–Redcliffe, Midland–Coolgardie); Alternative National Route 94 (Coolgardie–Kalgoorlie); National Route 1 (Victoria Park–Woodbridge); State Route 51 (Guildford–Midland)
- Tourist routes: Golden Pipeline Heritage Trail (multiple locations); Tourist Drive 203 (Guildford–Woodbridge)

Major junctions
- West end: Canning Highway (National Route 1 / State Route 6)
- Albany Highway (State Route 30); Graham Farmer Freeway (State Route 8); Tonkin Highway (State Route 4); Great Eastern Highway Bypass (National Highway 94); Roe Highway (State Route 3); Great Southern Highway; Northam–Toodyay Road (State Route 120); Northam–Pithara Road (State Route 115); Coolgardie–Esperance Highway (National Highway 94)
- East end: Goldfields Highway (Alternate National Route 94), Kalgoorlie

Location(s)
- Major settlements: Perth, Northam, Merredin, Southern Cross, Coolgardie, Kalgoorlie

Highway system
- Highways in Australia; National Highway • Freeways in Australia; Highways in Western Australia

Great Eastern Highway is a 590-kilometre-long (370 mi) road that links the Western Australian capital of Perth with the city of Kalgoorlie. A key route for road vehicles accessing the eastern Wheatbelt and the Goldfields, it is the western portion of the main road link between Perth and the eastern states of Australia. The highway forms the majority of National Highway 94, although the alignment through the Perth suburbs of Guildford and Midland, and the eastern section between Coolgardie and Kalgoorlie are not included. Various segments form parts of other road routes, including National Route 1, Alternative National Route 94, and State Route 51.

There are numerous intersections in Perth with other highways and main roads, including Canning, Albany, Tonkin and Roe Highways, and Graham Farmer Freeway. There are also two rural highways that spur off Great Eastern Highway. Great Southern Highway begins near Perth's eastern metropolitan boundary, linking towns such as York, Brookton, Narrogin, and Katanning. Near the eastern end of the highway, Coolgardie is the starting point of Coolgardie–Esperance Highway, connecting to the interstate route Eyre Highway at Norseman, as well as the coastal town of Esperance.

The highway was created in the 1930s from an existing system of roads linking Perth with the Goldfields. Though the name Great Eastern Highway was coined to describe the route from Perth to Guildford on the northern side of the Swan River (modern-day Guildford Road), it was actually used for the road through Belmont, south of the river. This section was constructed in 1867 using convict labour, with the road base made from sections of tree trunks. Over the years the road has been upgraded, with the whole highway sealed by 1953, segments reconstructed and widened, dual carriageways created in Perth and Kalgoorlie, and grade separated interchanges built at major intersections. Great Eastern Highway Bypass in Perth's eastern suburbs opened in 1988, allowing through traffic to avoid the Guildford and Midland townsites, and in 2002 a new bypass diverted the highway around Northam. A future route to replace Great Eastern Highway's current ascent of the Darling Scarp has been planned and named EastLink WA. The planned route is a controlled-access highway along Toodyay Road to Gidgegannup, and then across to Wundowie via a new alignment. Though planning began in the 1970s, construction is expected to begin in 2025.

== Route description ==
Great Eastern Highway links the Western Australian capital of Perth with the city of Kalgoorlie.

Great Eastern Highway commences at The Causeway, a river crossing that connects to Perth's central business district. Travelling north-east through the city to Greenmount Hill, and following a steep climb, the highway heads east through Western Australia's Wheatbelt to Kalgoorlie, in the state's Goldfields. Within Perth, the highway is a six-lane dual carriageway from The Causeway to Tonkin Highway near Perth Airport. It travels as a four lane single carriageway to Midland, with the second carriageway reappearing after Roe Highway, and continuing all the way to The Lakes at Perth's eastern fringe. The remainder of the highway is a two-lane single carriageway until Kalgoorlie, where a dual carriageway exists. The speed limit is 60 kilometres per hour (35 mph) from The Causeway to Midland, 70 km/h (45 mph) near the bottom of Greenmount Hill, and 80 km/h (50 mph) from Greenmount to Sawyers Valley. From the eastern edge of Perth it is generally 110 km/h (70 mph), but with lower limits for sections near the towns the highway encounters en route to Kalgoorlie.

GPHT sign

The highway runs mostly parallel to the Mundaring to Kalgoorlie water pipeline, which supplies the Goldfields with water from Mundaring Weir in the eastern part of Perth. The Golden Pipeline Heritage Trail is a tourist drive alongside the pipeline, with large sections of the trail following Great Eastern Highway. Various road routes are allocated to sections of Great Eastern Highway, with some overlap between some of the routes. It is mostly signed as National Highway 94, except for the section between Great Eastern Highway Bypass and Roe Highway, and the final 40 kilometres (25 mi) from Coolgardie to Kalgoorlie. It is also signed as National Route 1 between The Causeway and Morrison Road in Midland, State Route 51 between Johnson Street in Guildford and Roe Highway, Tourist Drive 203 between Terrace Road in Guildford and Morrison Road, Midland, and Alternate National Route 94 east of Coolgardie.

Main Roads Western Australia monitors traffic volume across the state's road network, including various locations along Great Eastern Highway. In 2008/09, the busiest section was east of the Graham Farmer Freeway interchange, averaging 60,760 vehicles per weekday. The lowest volume was an average of 850 vehicles per day near Ryans Find Road, partway between Southern Cross and Coolgardie; however, this point also received the largest proportion of heavy vehicles, at 40.2% of all traffic. As of 2012, Great Eastern Highway between Mundaring and Northam is the state's worst section of National Highway, in terms of road safety. Casualty crash rates had decreased since 2007, although the Royal Automobile Club of Western Australia (RAC) still considered it a risky section of road needing close attention from road authorities. (Note: The How Safe are our Roads? Rating Australia’s National Network for Risk report referred to by the RAC defines a casualty crash as "any road crash in which at least one person is killed or injured and this includes serious injuries which typically represent one third of casualty crashes".) In 2013, Great Eastern Highway remained as a road of particular concern, with the Australian Automobile Association giving 67% of the highway a low one- or two-star rating (out of five), and 77% of the route between The Lakes and Northam a one-star safety rating.

=== Burswood to Midvale ===
Great Eastern Highway begins at a grade separated interchange between the south-eastern end of The Causeway, north-eastern end of Canning Highway, and north-western ends of Shepperton Road and Albany Highway. It proceeds in a north-easterly direction between local parks for 1.3 kilometres (0.8 mi), south of the Crown Perth entertainment complex in Burswood. After passing under the Armadale line, there is a diamond interchange with Graham Farmer Freeway to the north-west and Orrong Road to the south-east, with an additional south-westbound to north-westbound looped ramp. The highway continues north-east, parallel to the Swan River, through the residential and commercial areas of Rivervale, Belmont, Ascot, and Redcliffe. There are many at-grade intersections and driveway access crossovers in these high density suburbs. Major intersections are controlled by traffic lights, while many others are left-in/left-out. After 4.6 kilometres (2.9 mi), Great Eastern Highway interchanges with Tonkin Highway, which connects to Perth's north-eastern and south-eastern suburbs. Until September 2018, the interchange was also connected to Brearley Avenue, which provided access to Perth Airport's domestic terminals. The connection was removed due to the construction of Redcliffe railway station as part of the Forrestfield-Airport Link. The main connection linking Great Eastern Highway to the precinct is now at Fauntleroy Avenue to the north-east.

Great Eastern Highway's route within Perth, highlighted in red

The road travels for another 2.1 kilometres (1.3 mi) along the border between Ascot and Redcliffe, before reaching a traffic light controlled fork with Great Eastern Highway Bypass. The main traffic flow continues east on the bypass to Roe Highway, while the Great Eastern Highway runs north-east through South Guildford for 2 kilometres (1.2 mi), separating a narrow residential area along the Swan River from industrial development in the rest of the suburb. The highway crosses the Helena River via a two-lane bridge, and continues north into the historic townsite of Guildford, named as Johnson Street. After 800 metres (2,600 ft), Johnson Street terminates at a T junction, just south of the Midland railway line. The highway turns east onto James Street, which after 1.2 kilometres (0.75 mi) has a sharp 90 degree turn to the north, continuing as East Street for 450 metres (1,480 ft). Following a level crossing of the railway, and an adjacent set of traffic lights at Terrace Road, the name Great Eastern Highway is resumed.

The highway continues north-east for 1.6 kilometres (1 mi) to Midland. Throughout Midland and the adjacent suburb of Midvale, it is at the centre of a commercial area, with two shopping centres located alongside the highway, and retail businesses fronting both sides of the road. As Great Eastern Highway enters Midland, traffic splits into a pair of one-way roads. Eastbound traffic continues on Great Eastern Highway, while westbound traffic travels along Victoria Street. The split ends after 1 kilometre (0.6 mi), and a further 1.8 kilometres (1.1 mi) takes the highway to an interchange with Roe Highway, meeting up with traffic that bypassed the Guildford and Midland areas.

Most of this section of the Highway is actually a road as it contains driveways, entrances and exits. At a 2019 Belmont council meeting interstate town planners attended and mentioned that with 60,000 to 80,000 vehicles a day in the section west or Roe Hwy they could not find a busier "road" (not Highway or Freeway) in the world. They looked at the Avenue des Champs-Élysées in France and Market Street in San Francisco. West of Roe Hwy.

=== Greenmount to The Lakes ===
Travelling downhill at Greenmount. Signs warn trucks to "use low gear", and restrict heavy vehicles to a 40 km/h (25 mph) speed limit. At the bottom of the hill is a truck arrester bed.

Great Eastern Highway is notorious for Greenmount Hill, where the highway encounters a steep three-kilometre-long (1.9 mi) slope with a 7% gradient on Perth's eastern outskirts. The highway rises from the Swan Coastal Plain to the Darling Scarp to the north of Greenmount Hill, though it is commonly described as travelling "up Greenmount". The historic hill, with significant Aboriginal and European heritage sites, has been a well-known landmark since the 1830s, and featured on an 1846 survey of the York Road. Part of this original eastern route remains as a separate road, now known as Old York Road. The highway diverges from this original route at a point 2.8 kilometres (1.7 mi) east of Roe Highway, bypassing residential properties that line the old road. The two routes meet again at the top of the main climb of the hill, after 1.8 kilometres (1.1 mi).

From the sudden rise of Greenmount Hill through to Sawyers Valley, Great Eastern Highway has a series of rising and falling sections over rolling terrain. Along the way, the route follows the southern edge of John Forrest National Park for 3.3 kilometres (2.1 mi), passing to the north of the suburb of Glen Forrest. Beyond the national park, the highway continues to be lined by native trees and patches of remaining forest. It continues east for six kilometres (3.7 mi) between the low-density, rural residential areas of Hovea, Mahogany Creek, and Parkerville, before entering the Mundaring town centre. Continuing its journey east, the route leaves Mundaring and travels briefly through the north-eastern corner of Beelu National Park before coming to the rural community of Sawyers Valley, three and a half kilometres (2.2 mi) east of Mundaring.

Beyond Sawyers Valley, Great Eastern Highway travels in a north-easterly direction, alongside and later within the northernmost part of the Jarrahdale State Forest. After 6.6 kilometres (4.1 mi), the highway reaches the Old Northam Road turnoff, which offers an alternative route through Chidlow. The highway route bypasses the development by continuing east for 5.9 kilometres (3.7 mi) to The Lakes, where it curves around to the north to meet Great Southern Highway, at the edge of the Perth Metropolitan Region.

=== East to Kalgoorlie ===
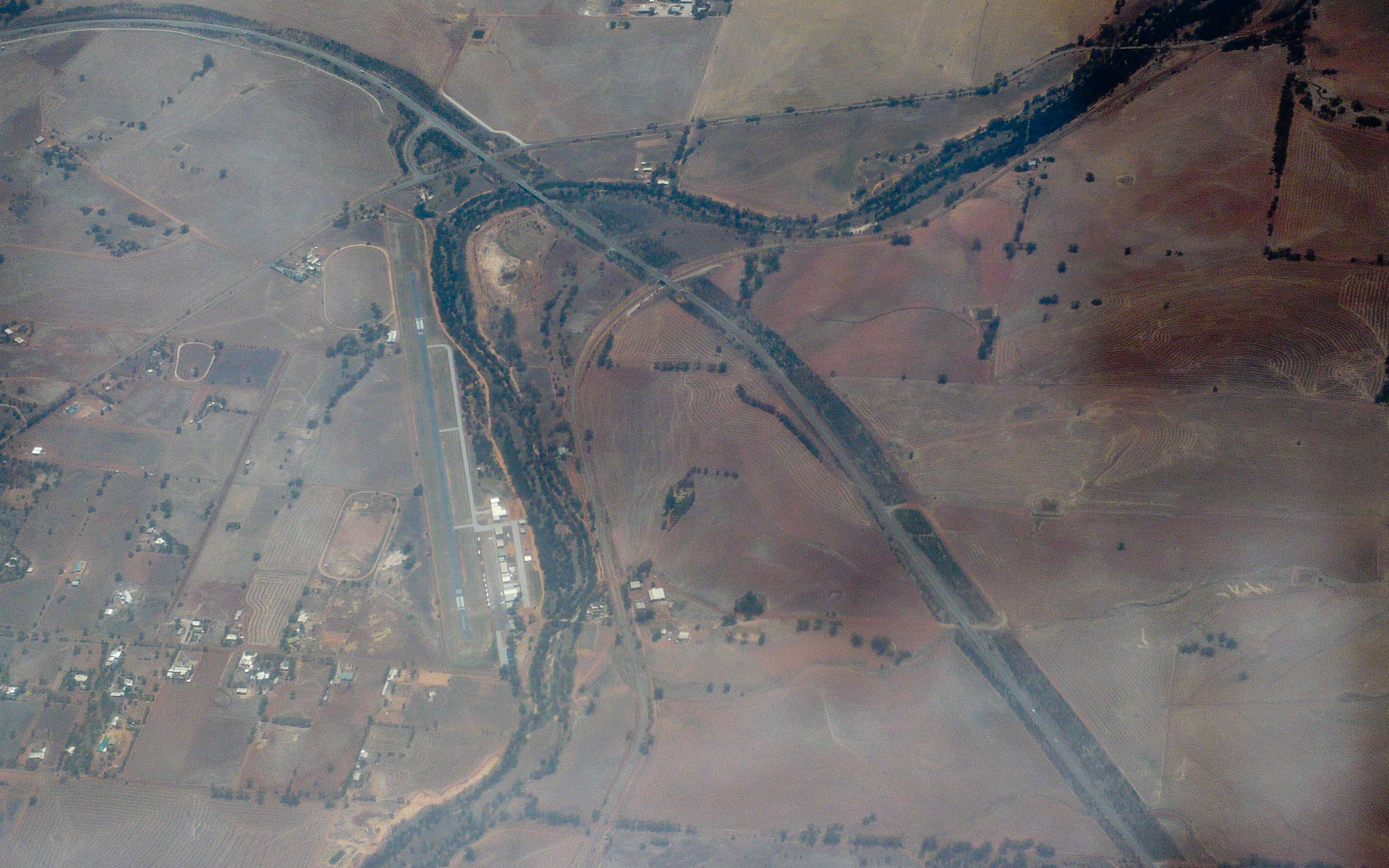
Northam airport, at the junction of Great Eastern Highway and Northam–Pithara Road

Great Eastern Highway continues past The Lakes in a northerly direction, reduced to a single carriageway with one lane in each direction. Five kilometres (3 mi) later, the highway encounters the north-eastern end of Old Northam Road, and subsequently winds its way through a reverse curve. It travels in between Acacia Prison and Wooroloo Prison Farm and then alongside Wooroloo Brook, for 3.7 kilometres (2.3 mi), before crossing the waterway. The highway then heads in a north-easterly direction, passing to the south of Wundowie, through Bakers Hill, and reaching Clackline after 20 kilometres (12 mi). Another 12.4 kilometres (7.7 mi) takes Great Eastern Highway to Mitchell Avenue, the turnoff for Northam, and part of the highway's former route through the town. The highway takes an 11.7-kilometre (7.3 mi) curve around the northern edge of Northam, meeting up with the eastern section of the former alignment, known as Yilgarn Avenue. This section of highway, also known as the Northam Bypass, intersects three other roads at grade separated interchanges: Northam–Toodyay Road, Irishtown Road, and Northam–Pithara Road. Each interchange consists of a flyover bridge for the highway, and a single two-way ramp that connects to each road at a T junction.

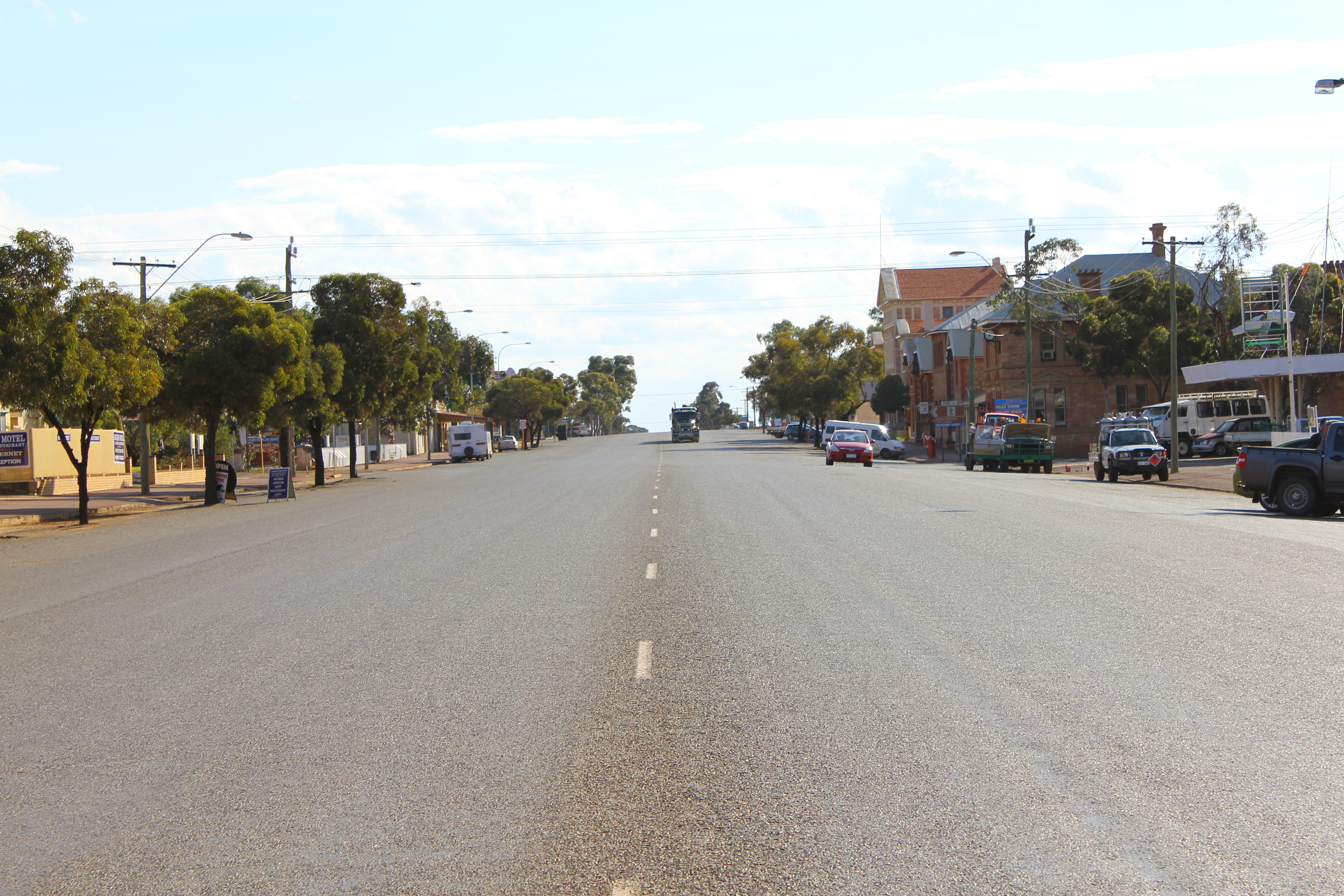
View west along Great Eastern Highway in Coolgardie

The highway heads east through the Wheatbelt as the region's main east–west route. The road passes by agricultural land and remnant native vegetation, intermittently encountering small settlements and towns such as Meckering, Cunderdin, Kellerberrin, and Merredin. Great Eastern Highway enters Southern Cross 265 kilometres (165 mi) out from Northam, near the edge of the Wheatbelt. The landscape changes to low shrubland, with few signs of human activity other than the highway itself, and the mostly parallel water pipeline and power line. The road continues eastwards in this fashion over a vast distance of 285 kilometres (177 mi) before reaching the town of Coolgardie. Three hundred metres (980 ft) beyond the townsite, traffic bound for South Australia turns south onto Coolgardie–Esperance Highway, following the National Highway 94 route. Great Eastern Highway, now signposted as Alternate National Route 94, turns north-east, travelling through another 32 kilometres (20 mi) of scrubland to the outskirts of Kalgoorlie. The road continues its journey eastward within the grid of Kalgoorlie's road system, initially passing by the industrial district of West Kalgoorlie. After 1.9 kilometres (1.2 mi), the highway once more becomes a dual carriageway, and travels past residential neighbourhoods. Following 1.2 kilometres (0.75 mi), the highway takes on the name Hannan Street, and continues for 3.5 kilometres (2.2 mi) through to downtown Kalgoorlie, terminating at Goldfields Highway on Kalgoorlie's eastern edge. Alternate Route 94 turns south, back towards the National Highway route.

== History ==
=== Convict-era road ===
A road along what is now Great Eastern Highway has existed since the convict era of Western Australia. The original road is thought to have been constructed in 1867, using convict labour, with a road base made of jarrah tree trunks cut into disc shapes. The use of wooden discs as a road base had been proposed by Western Australian Governor John Hampton, leading them to be known as "Hampton's Cheeses". The discs were approximately 30 centimetres (1 ft) thick and as large as 90 centimetres (3 ft) in diameter, and the gaps between pieces would have been filled with soil or lime. The same type of road is known to have existed along Stirling Highway, Guildford Road, Albany Highway and Wanneroo Road in the 1860s, and would have prevented horses and carts from getting bogged in wet weather. Evidence of this original road was found in Belmont in 1948 when widening works uncovered jarrah discs. During upgrade works in 2012, more discs were discovered beneath the existing asphalt, over a twenty-metre (66 ft) stretch.

=== Highway origins ===
Perth to Coolgardie, 1895–96

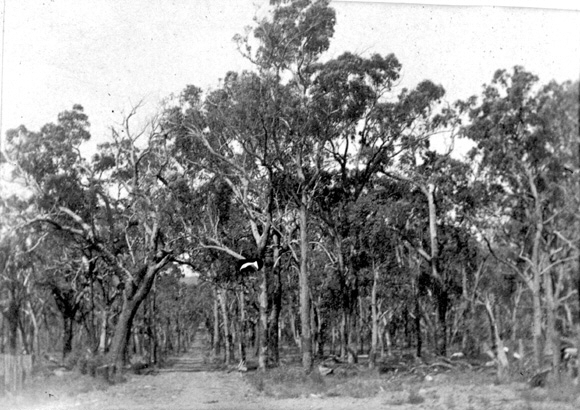
Road through the hills, crossing the Darling Scarp

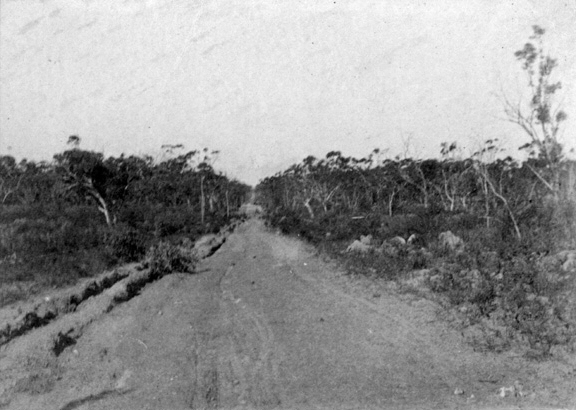
Road through the bush (location unknown, probably the Darling Scarp)

Views along the main road crossing the Darling Scarp in the 1890s, leading towards Coolgardie. The entire route from Perth to Kalgoorlie would become Great Eastern Highway in the 1930s.

The name Great Eastern Highway was coined by the Perth Road Board in December 1933. It was suggested for the Perth to Guildford road on the north side of the Swan River (now known as Guildford Road), as an alternative to the Bassendean Road Board's proposal, Perth Road. In February 1934, the Bassendean Road Board agreed to the name, as Perth Road would be too general, and the road was considered the main artery serving eastern districts, all the way through to Kalgoorlie. Other local governments in the area considered the issue over the next few months. The Bayswater Road Board and Greenmount Road Board were in favour of the idea, but Guildford Road Board was opposed, as several local road names would be lost. Greenmount, and public advertising, thereafter referred to the road as Great Eastern Highway, and the council wrote to the Main Roads Department, requesting the name change be gazetted. This prompted Main Roads to write to other local governments, advising of the request and soliciting their views. The Mundaring Road Board and Kellerberrin Road Board were supportive, while the Kalgoorlie Road Board suggested Great Eastern Goldfields Highway. The Kalgoorlie Municipal Council agreed that the road should be known as a highway, but thought the name was inadequate for a road that only connected Midland Junction with Coolgardie. The Midland Junction Municipal Council opposed the renaming, citing "sentimental and practical reasons for the continuance of the use of the old name".

In August 1934, the Bassendean Road Board applied to the Lands Department to change the portion of the Perth–Guildford road within its district to Great Eastern Highway. The department refused the request, reasoning that most traffic bound for Midland used The Causeway and travelled on the south side of the Swan River, and that therefore the Perth–Guildford road should not be part of the main highway. Despite this setback, the Perth Road Board organised a local government conference to consider renaming the road from Perth to Guildford. The issue was considered important, as losing the name to the south side of the river would divert traffic away from the old established centres to the north. The straightening of dangerous bends and the replacement of an old bridge between Bassendean and Guildford were also to be considered. The conference, held on 7 September 1934, was attended by representatives of the Perth, Bayswater, Bassendean, and Guildford road boards, and the Midland Junction Council. Guildford and Midland Junction were still opposed to the renaming, but the others were supportive. Motions that passed included submitting a rename proposal to the state government, urging the government to construct a new bridge at Bassendean, and approaching the government to have the road declared a main road.

In November 1934, the state government Land Council contacted the local governments on the south side of the Swan River, asking them to rename the roads that make up the Causeway–Midland route as Great Eastern Highway. Both the Perth City Council and Belmont Park Road Board agreed to the request. This created a "peculiar situation", as described by the RAC, with roads both north and south of the Swan River proposed to be renamed as Great Eastern Highway. Despite the name change not being official, some residents along the road through Belmont started describing their properties as located on Great Eastern Highway.

Another conference of the local governments north of the river was held in December 1934. They decided to continue to pursue renaming the Perth–Guildford road to Great Eastern Highway, and having it gazetted as a main road. A letter from the Commissioner of Main Roads had stated that the road through Belmont was considered the principal highway to the eastern states. He therefore recommended that if the name Great Eastern Highway were to be applied west of Midland Junction, it should be to that road, as the road through Bassendean was not considered a main road. Traffic counts collected by the Bassendean Road Board, however, showed that the north of river route, through Bassendean, carried more traffic in both directions than the southern route, through Belmont – 54% compared to 46%. The northern route was also shorter by about two miles (3.2 km), and considered by the local governments to be the "natural entrance to the city", only crossing the Swan River once and not again at the Causeway.

On 8 January 1935, representatives from the local governments north of the river urged Minister for Lands, Michael Troy, to rename the Perth–Guildford road through those areas as Great Eastern Highway. Despite the route being shorter and carrying more traffic, he refused. He said that it was not gazetted as main road, and a previous decision to rename the road through Belmont as Great Eastern Highway was made after considering the facts, and at the request of the Main Roads Board. There was resentment and an objection over the name being "pinched" from the Perth Road Board. The minister disregarded the objection. He advised the representatives to see the Minister for Works to get the road declared a main road, and then approach him with a new name. This resolved Great Eastern Highway's route, with the local governments north of the river pursuing other names such as Main Highway.

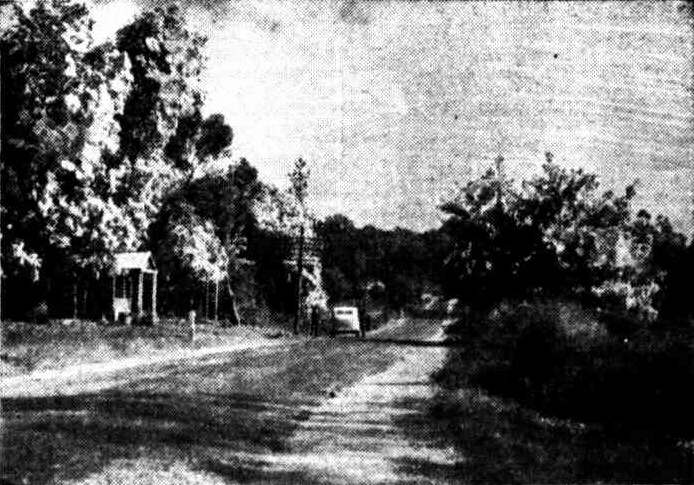
View of Great Eastern Highway, lined by wattle, through Mahogany Creek in 1939

On 14 April 1938, the name Great Eastern Highway was gazetted, in accordance with section 10 of the Land Act, 1933–1937. It replaced the names previously used along the route: Ascot Road, Guildford Road, York Road, Guildford–Northam Road, Toodyay–Northam Road, Mitchell Avenue, Throsell Road, Sermon Road, Dreyer Road, Goldfields Road, Kalgoorlie Road, Woodward Street, and Coolgardie Road.

=== Upgrades and improvements ===
By 1950, the highway had been sealed from Perth to Southern Cross, and from a few miles west of Coolgardie to Kalgoorlie. Traffic in the Goldfields was light, with an average daily traffic of 44 vehicles between Southern Cross and Coolgardie, and 33 from Coolgardie to Kalgoorlie. The road was completely sealed by 1953. Between 1954 and 1956, sections of the highway between Perth and Southern Cross were improved. The works included increasing the seal width along 38 miles (61 km) of the road, reconstructing 3 miles (5 km) of road, and resealing 23.5 miles (37.8 km). Precast concrete structures were used to replace two old, narrow wooden bridges.

In the 1950s, roundabouts were constructed at each end of The Causeway, to improve the flow of traffic on the bridges and the distribution of traffic back into the road network. The roundabout at the eastern end, connecting with Great Eastern Highway, opened in 1952. In 1973 construction began on upgrading that intersection to a grade-separated partial cloverleaf interchange. The interchange opened on 8 March 1974, having cost AUS$1.3 million.

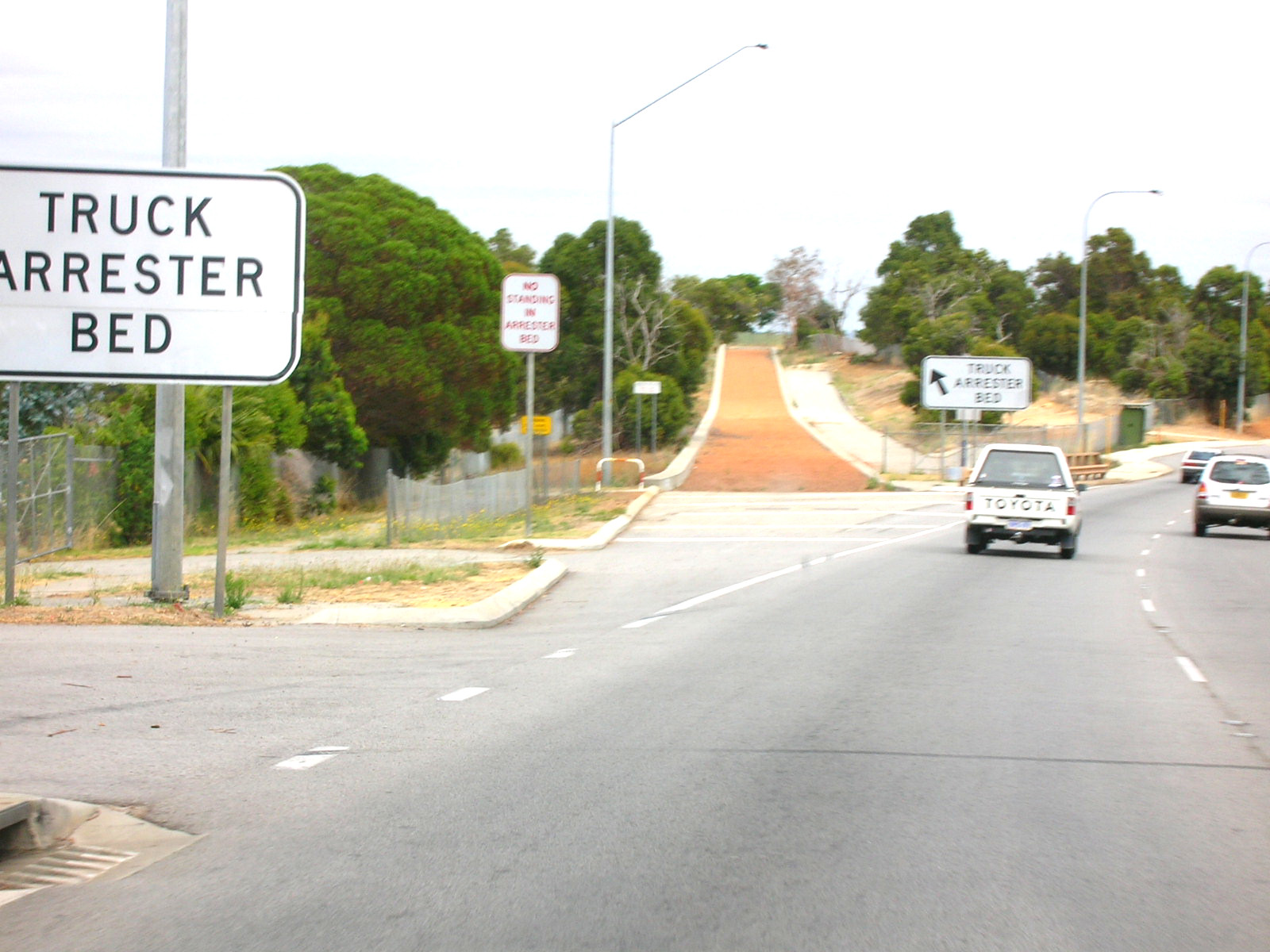
Greenmount Hill truck arrester bed

A major accident occurred at the intersection with Roe Highway on 30 December 1993. A truck lost control coming down Greenmount Hill and rolled over at the intersection, after crashing into six vehicles on the hill and another 14 at the intersection. One woman was killed, and another 12 people were injured, including four with serious injuries. It was Western Australia's worst accident that year, according to police, with the aftermath described by a witness as "like a battlefield". This accident led to the construction of a truck arrester bed near the bottom of the hill. It has been used in emergencies several times since.

In 1994, the federal government approved a $43.9 million project to upgrade substandard sections of Great Eastern Highway between Northam and Southern Cross. That portion of the highway was one of the oldest sections of the National Highway in Western Australia. The road was susceptible to failure due to poor drainage and frequent flooding. Further works in the 1990s saw a second carriageway constructed from Mundaring to Sawyers Valley, and then extended to The Lakes at the edge of Perth. A dual carriageway was also constructed in Kalgoorlie, and a long overtaking lane was built near Clackline.

More recent works have improved sections of the highway in Perth. Great Eastern Highway's intersection with Roe Highway was upgraded to a grade separated interchange. The design is a diamond interchange, with free-flowing traffic on Roe Highway, and an additional looped ramp for northbound to eastbound traffic movements. Construction of the $101.5 million project began in late 2010, and the interchange was officially opened to traffic on 9 June 2012. Another project undertaken was the widening of the highway through the suburbs of Rivervale, Belmont and Redcliffe – between Kooyong Road, just north-east of the Graham Farmer Freeway interchange, and Tonkin Highway. Work commenced in June 2011, and was completed in February 2013, nine months earlier than scheduled. Prime Minister Julia Gillard opened the upgraded highway on 28 March 2013, participating in a ribbon-cutting ceremony. The $280 million upgrade included construction of a median strip, widening the road to three lanes in each direction, bus priority lanes at several traffic light controlled intersections, and bicycle lanes. The upgrade was expected to reduce congestion along the highway, which had been one of Perth's worst accident spots in 2011/12. However, the accidents were usually not serious, and roadworks were considered a "major contributing factor". In October 2013, the project was recognised with the Civil Contractors Federation National Earth Award for Excellence.

=== Bypasses ===
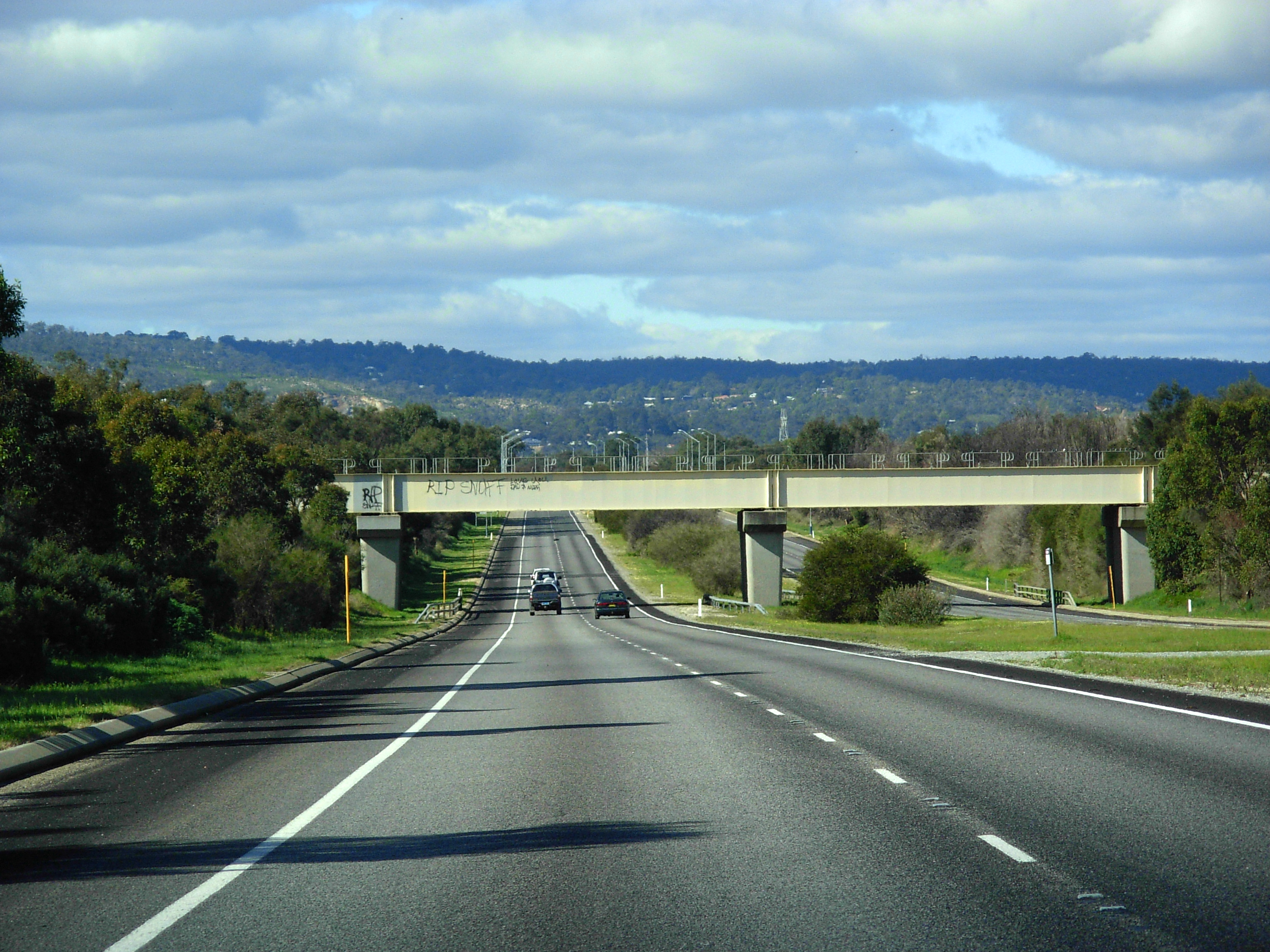
View along Great Eastern Highway Bypass. The Darling Scarp is visible in the background.

Great Eastern Highway Bypass, together with Roe Highway, provides a limited-access bypass of Guildford and Midland town sites. The 5.6-kilometre (3.5 mi) bypass branches off the original highway alignment at South Guildford, proceeds around the northern edge of Perth Airport, and then heads east through Hazelmere. At the eastern end of Great Eastern Highway Bypass, traffic returns to the main highway by heading north on Roe Highway for three kilometres (1.9 mi). Plans for a major highway along a similar alignment date back to Gordon Stephenson and Alistair Hepburn's 1955 "Plan for the Metropolitan Region", which was the precursor of Perth's Metropolitan Region Scheme. The road was constructed in the late 1980s, and was known as the Redcliffe–Bushmead Highway during construction. Great Eastern Highway Bypass was opened on 14 May 1988, after 21 months of construction, and at a cost of $10 million.

Planning for a bypass around Northam began in the 1960s. The original route through the town centre functioned as both a local access road and primary traffic route, including for heavy vehicles. There were particular concerns with the amount of traffic congestion, frequency of crashes, and the noise and visual pollution of the highway's traffic. Twelve different alignments were considered for the bypass, which were narrowed down to three options by the 1990s. In 1993 the Environmental Protection Authority assessed the proposal, and found that only the route that deviated furthest away from the townsite would be environmentally acceptable. The closer routes were not acceptable due to the potential impact on the Avon River. The project gained the Minister for the Environment's conditional approval on 24 June 1994. Construction of the Northam bypass began in January 2001, with the new road opened on 17 May 2002.

A bypass of Clackline was also constructed, realigning 1.5 kilometres (0.93 mi) of Great Eastern Highway 100 metres (330 ft) north of the town. Works began in January 2007, and were completed in February 2008. The project also involved constructing overtaking lanes between Clackline and Bakers Hill, upgrading intersections in Clackline, and constructing a pedestrian underpass for a heritage trail. Clackline Brook was realigned through a large box culvert, allowing a safer crossing than the narrow Clackline Bridge on the original alignment. The bypass was originally allocated $2.4 million of funding in 2006, but by January 2007 it was expected to cost almost $11 million. The final project value was $9.2 million. Issues and challenges in the project's design and construction included extensive rock protection requirements for the Clackline Brook culvert, drilling and blasting close to the existing highway, and protecting heritage and environmentally sensitive areas. The Clackline community welcomed the bypass, but there were concerns that the historic Clackline Bridge would be lost. The bridge has since received a permanent entry on the Heritage Council of Western Australia's Register of Heritage Places, in November 2008.

== Future ==
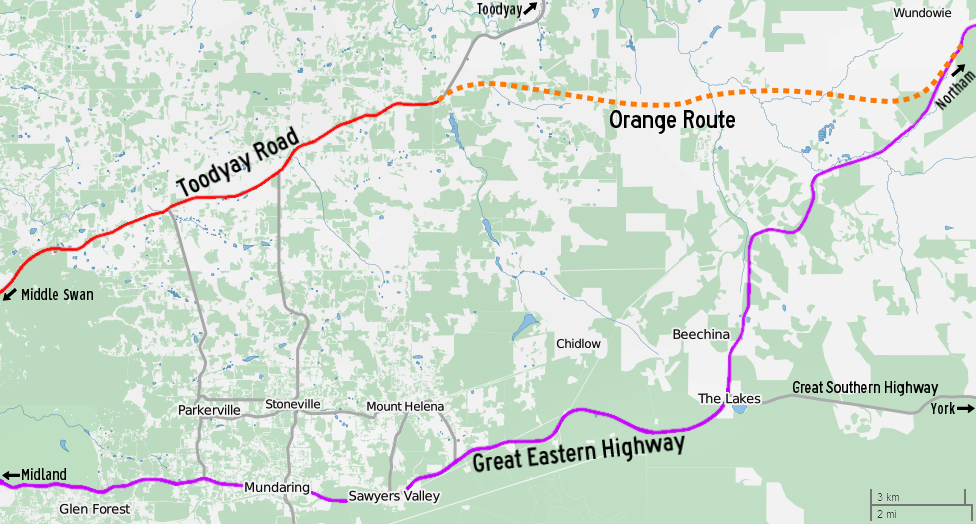
Future alignment of the Perth–Adelaide National Highway, along Toodyay Road (red) and the proposed Orange Route (dashed orange). The current alignment is along Great Eastern Highway (purple).

There are long-term plans to bypass Great Eastern Highway's current ascent of the Darling Scarp, to be known as EastLink WA. Planning for a new major road network in Perth's eastern corridor began in the 1970s. Early planning efforts between 1978 and 1981 for a new highway reservation from Mundaring to Wooroloo encountered community opposition, and the Environmental Protection Authority (EPA) requested a more detailed environmental assessment. In 1985, a study into the primary east–west traffic routes in the area was commissioned by the Main Roads Department, Metropolitan Region Planning Authority, (Note: Later known as the State Planning Commission, now the Western Australian Planning Commission) Shire of Mundaring, and Shire of Swan. It recommended a new alignment, known as the "Orange Route", be selected for the Perth to Adelaide National Highway. Alternative routes were identified using other colours as codenames. The new national highway would travel north-east along Toodyay Road from Roe Highway to beyond Gidgegannup, and then deviate east via the proposed Orange Route to meet Great Eastern Highway near Wundowie. The ultimate design of the highway included grade-separated interchanges for all of the roads that it intersects. The Orange Route received environmental approval on 22 November 1989. Detailed planning for the Clackline to Wooroloo section of the Orange Route was to begin in 1998. Construction of the Orange Route is not a priority for Main Roads. Plans are still in development, but the federal government is responsible for financing the project. Construction on Eastlink WA is expected to begin in 2025.

== Major intersections ==
LGA	Location	km	mi	Destinations	Notes
Victoria Park	Burswood–Victoria Park boundary	0.00	0.00	Canning Highway southwest (National Route 1 / State Route 6) / The Causeway northwest (State Route 5) / Shepperton Road southeast (State Route 30) / Albany Highway southeast – Fremantle, Perth, Armadale	Grade separated; no access into Albany Highway, nor northwest bound to northeast bound; National Highway 94 western terminus; National Route 1 continues southwest and northeast
Victoria Park–Belmont boundary	Burswood–Lathlain–Rivervale tripoint	1.63– 1.86	1.01– 1.16	Graham Farmer Freeway (State Route 8) northwest / Orrong Road (State Route 8) southeast – Perth, Joondalup, Welshpool	Diamond interchange with additional southwest bound to northwest bound loop ramp
Belmont	Ascot–Belmont boundary	4.35	2.70	Stoneham Street (State Route 55) north / Belgravia Street (State Route 55) southeast – Bayswater, Kewdale	
Belmont	Ascot–Redcliffe boundary	6.34– 6.62	3.94– 4.11	Tonkin Highway northbound ramps (State Route 4) – Morley	Diamond interchange with additional eastbound to southbound loop ramp
Belmont	Ascot–Redcliffe boundary	6.34– 6.62	3.94– 4.11	Tonkin Highway southbound ramps (State Route 4) – Armadale, Perth Airport	Brearley Avenue provided direct access to the T3/T4 airport precinct until 2018.
Belmont	Ascot–Redcliffe boundary	7.80	4.85	Fauntleroy Avenue – Perth Airport	Main access to the T3/T4 airport precinct.
Swan	South Guildford	8.44	5.24	Great Eastern Highway Bypass (National Highway 94) east to Roe Highway – Midland, Armadale, Fremantle	T junction; National Highway 94 eastern concurrency terminus; eastbound traffic turns north via slip road; westbound traffic turns west
Swan	South Guildford	10.02	6.23	Kalamunda Road – Kalamunda	
Helena River		10.48– 10.57	6.51– 6.57	Bridge over river	
Swan	Guildford	10.57	6.57	Eastbound traffic continues north on Johnson Street, westbound traffic continues south on Great Eastern Highway	
Swan	Guildford	11.26	7.00	James Street (State Route 51) west – Bassendean, Midland	T junction; State Route 51 western concurrency terminus; eastbound traffic turns east onto James Street, westbound traffic turns south onto Johnson Street
Swan	Guildford	11.52	7.16	Meadow Street (State Route 52) to West Swan Road – Ellenbrook, Swan Valley	
Swan	Guildford	12.25	7.61	Eastbound traffic continues north on East Street, westbound traffic continues west on James Street	
Swan	Guildford	12.93	8.03	Terrace Road (Tourist Drive 203) west – Guildford	Tourist Drive 203 western concurrency terminus; eastbound traffic turns north-east onto Great Eastern Highway, westbound traffic turns south onto East Street
Swan	Woodbridge–Midland boundary	14.29	8.88	Morrison Road (National Route 1 north / Tourist Drive 203 north) – Midland, Middle Swan, Swan District Hospital	National Route 1 and Tourist Drive 203 eastern concurrency termini
Swan	Midland	15.97	9.92	Lloyd Street – Midland, Middle Swan	
Swan–Mundaring boundary	Midvale	17.18– 17.38	10.68– 10.80	Roe Highway (National Highway 94 south / National Highway 95 north / State Route 3) – to Great Northern Highway, Perth, Kewdale, Armadale	Modified diamond interchange (Roe Highway free flowing) with additional northbound to eastbound loop ramp; route transition: State Route 51 eastern terminus; National Highway 94 continues east
Mundaring	Mundaring	31.20	19.39	Mundaring Weir Road (Tourist Drive 207) south / Stoneville Road north – Mundaring Weir, Stoneville, Gidgegannup	
Mundaring	Sawyers Valley	34.77	21.61	Sawyers Road – Mount Helena	
Mundaring	Sawyers Valley	41.33	25.68	Old Northam Road – Chidlow	
Mundaring	Beechina–The Lakes boundary	47.26	29.37	Great Southern Highway – York	
Mundaring	Beechina–Wooroloo boundary	52.68	32.73	Old Northam Road – Wooroloo	
Northam	Copely–Wundowie boundary	62.05	38.56	Hawke Avenue north – Wundowie	
Northam	Clackline	77.06	47.88	Spencers Brook Road to Clackline–Toodyay Road – Spencers Brook, Muresk, Toodyay	
Northam	Burlong	89.14	55.39	Mitchell Avenue – Northam	
Northam	Burlong	92.30	57.35	Northam–Toodyay Road (State Route 120) west / Newcastle east (State Route 120) south – Northam, Toodyay	Grade separated interchange with a single ramp
Avon River		93.01– 93.25	57.79– 57.94	Bridge over river	
Northam	Irishtown	94.89	58.96	Irishtown Road – Northam, Bejoording	Grade separated interchange with a single ramp
Northam	Irishtown–Malabaine boundary	96.61	60.03	Northam–Pithara Road (State Route 115) – Northam, Goomalling	Grade separated interchange with a single ramp
Northam	Malabaine	100.84	62.66	Yilgarn Avenue – Northam	
Cunderdin	Meckering	129.84	80.68	Dunlop Street to Goomalling–Meckering Road northwest / to Dowerin–Meckering Road northeast – Goomalling, Dowerin	
Cunderdin	Cunderdin	152.51	94.77	Baxter Road to Cunderdin–Wyalkatchem Road – Wyalkatchem	
Cunderdin	Cunderdin	153.50	95.38	Cubbine Street to Cunderdin–Quairading Road – Quairading	
Tammin	Tammin	176.77	109.84	Station Road to Tammin–Wyalkatchem Road north / to Goldfields Road south – Wyalkatchem, York	
Kellerberrin	Kellerberrin	199.58– 200.27	124.01– 124.44	Bencubbin–Kellerberrin Road north via West Crossing Road / East Crossing Road – Trayning, Bencubbin	Pair of T junctions
Kellerberrin	Kellerberrin	199.67	124.07	Scott Road south to Kellerberrin–Yoting Road – Yoting, York	T junction
Kellerberrin	Doodlakine	215.6	134.0	Doodlakine–Bruce Rock Road – Doodlakine	
Merredin	Merredin	256.78	159.56	Barrack Street to Merredin–Nungarin Road – Nungarin, Wyalkatchem	
Merredin	Merredin	257.07	159.74	South Avenue to Bruce Rock Merredin Road – Bruce Rock	
Merredin	Merredin	259.88	161.48	Merredin–Narembeen Road – Narembeen, Muntadgin, Hyden	
Westonia	Walgoolan	291.55	181.16	Warralakin Road – Warralakin	
Westonia	Carrabin	299.68	186.21	Carrabin South Road / Westonia Road north – Westonia	
Yilgarn	Southern Cross	366.08	227.47	Antares Street northwest to Bullfinch Road / Marvel Loch Road southeast – Bullfinch, Marvel Loch	
Coolgardie	Coolgardie	554.43	344.51	Coolgardie–Esperance Highway (National Highway 94) – Norseman, Esperance	Route transition: National Highway 94 continues west and south; Alternate National Route 94 western terminus
Kalgoorlie-Boulder	West Kalgoorlie–Yilkari boundary	586.17	364.23	Anzac Drive southeast / West Kalgoorlie Road northwest – South Boulder, West Kalgoorlie	
Kalgoorlie-Boulder	Somerville	588.3	365.6	Gatacre Drive – Boulder, Kalgoorlie-Boulder Airport	
Kalgoorlie-Boulder	Somerville	589.3	366.2	Eastbound traffic continues east on Hannan Street, westbound traffic continues west on Great Eastern Highway	
Kalgoorlie-Boulder	Kalgoorlie	592.29	368.03	Maritana Street north / Boulder Road south – Hannans, Boulder	
Kalgoorlie-Boulder	Kalgoorlie–Williamstown boundary	592.82	368.36	Goldfields Highway (Alternate National Route 94 south) – Menzies, Leonora, Kambalda	Eastern highway terminus; Alternate National Route 94 continues south
1.000 mi = 1.609 km; 1.000 km = 0.621 mi: Concurrency terminus; Incomplete access; Route transition

== See also ==
- Highways in Australia
- List of highways in Western Australia
