= Viveash =

Viveash may refer to:

- Adi Viveash (born 1969), footballer
- Viveash, Western Australia
