= Swan View, Western Australia =

Swan View
- Suburb
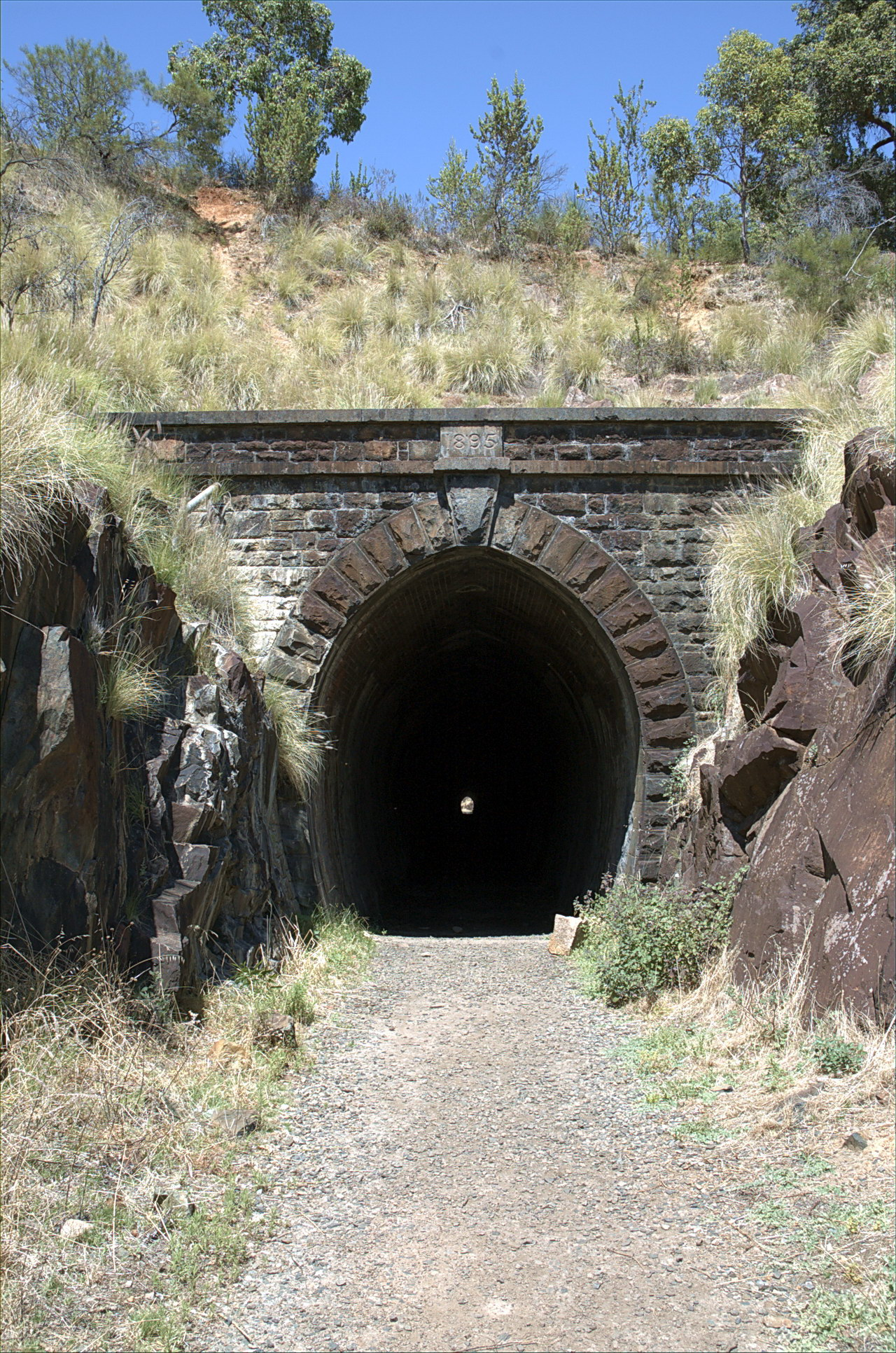
- Swan View Tunnel
- Interactive map of Swan View
- Coordinates: 31.888°S 116.049°E
- Country: Australia
- State: Western Australia
- City: Perth
- LGAs: Shire of Mundaring; City of Swan
- Location: 6 km (3.7 mi) from Midland

Government
  - State electorate: Midland
  - Federal division: Hasluck

Area
  - Total: 7.3 km^{2} (2.8 sq mi)

Population
  - Total: 7,889 (SAL 2021)
- Postcode: 6056
Suburbs around Swan View
Middle Swan	Stratton	Jane Brook
Midvale	Swan View	Hovea
Bellevue	Greenmount	Darlington

Swan View is an eastern suburb of Perth, Western Australia. Its local government areas are the City of Swan and the Shire of Mundaring. It is 25 kilometres (16 mi) from Perth in the Perth Hills on the edge of the Darling Scarp, just to the west of the John Forrest National Park, east of Roe Highway and north of the Great Eastern Highway.

The Brown Park community recreation ground is the location of the long-standing annual Swan View Agricultural Show.

== Transport ==
Swan View railway station was the important control point for traffic through and around the Swan View Tunnel until it closed on 13 February 1966.

Today, Swan View is served by Transperth buses from Midland, operated by the Public Transport Authority, while Transwa's AvonLink and Prospector services to Northam and beyond runs along Swan View's western edge.

=== Bus ===
- 313 Jane Brook to Midland station – serves Talbot Road and Morrison Road
- 314 Midland station to Midland station – Clockwise Circular Route, serves Talbot Road and Morrison Road
- 315 Midland station to Midland station – Clockwise Circular Route, serves Myles Road, Friday Corner, Blackadder Road and Morrison Road
- 323 Swan View to Midland station – serves Talbot Road, Tunnel Road, Viveash Road, Stirling Close, Salisbury Road, Welbourn Road, Beresford Gardens, Amherst Road, Buckingham Road, Marlboro Road and Morrison Road
- 324 Midland station to Midland station – Anti-Clockwise Circular Route, serves Morrison Road and Talbot Road
- 325 Midland station to Midland station – Anti-Clockwise Circular Route, serves Morrison Road, Myles Road and Blackadder Road
- 327 Swan View Shopping Centre to Midland station – serves Marlboro Road, Fairfax Road, Blanchard Road, Myles Road and Morrison Road

== Geography ==
Swan View is bounded by the Eastern railway line to the west, the former railway (now part of the Railway Reserves Heritage Trail) to the south, John Forrest National Park to the east, and a line east from Blackadder Creek (in part incorporating O'Connor Road and Murchison Drive) to the north. The suburb is almost entirely residential and parkland.

At the 2021 census, Swan View had a population of 7,889.
