= Acacia auronitens =

Scientific classification
- Kingdom: Plantae
- Clade: Tracheophytes
- Clade: Angiosperms
- Clade: Eudicots
- Clade: Rosids
- Order: Fabales
- Family: Fabaceae
- Subfamily: Caesalpinioideae
- Clade: Mimosoid clade
- Genus: Acacia
- Species: A. auronitens

Binomial name
- Acacia auronitens Lindl.
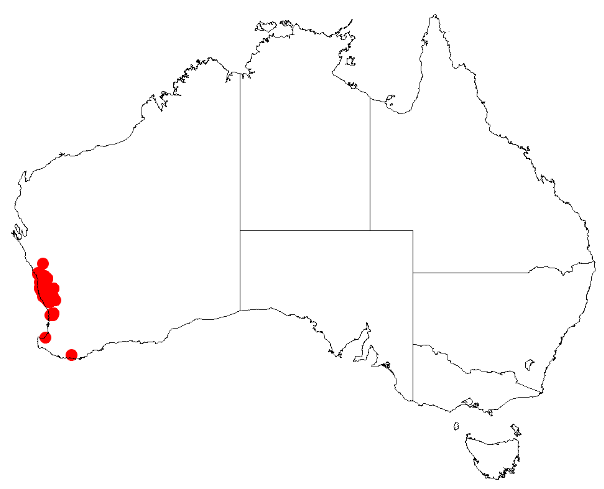
- Acacia auronitens occurrence data from Australasian Virtual Herbarium

Synonyms
- Acacia aureonitens F.Muell. orth. var.; Acacia auronitens Lindl. var. auronitens; Racosperma auronitens (Lindl.) Pedley

Species of legume

Habit in Talbot Road Bushland in Stratton

Acacia auronitens is a species of flowering plant in the family Fabaceae and is endemic to the south-west of Western Australia. It is a spreading, often low-lying shrub with many branches, narrowly oblong, rigid, prickly phyllodes, spherical heads of golden-yellow flowers, and crust-like to woody pods up to 45 mm (1.8 in) long.

== Description ==
Acacia auronitens is a spreading, often low-lying shrub that typically grows to a height of 10–50 cm (3.9–19.7 in). Its phyllodes are narrowly oblong, rigid and prickly, mostly 7–22 mm (0.28–0.87 in) long and 1–4 mm (0.039–0.157 in) wide with stipules 2–4 mm (0.079–0.157 in) long at the base. The flowers are borne in spherical heads arranged singly in axils on a peduncle mostly 8–14 mm (0.31–0.55 in) long, each head with 15 to 25 golden-yellow flowers. Flowering has been recorded in April, June, and from August to January, and the pods are narrowly oblong, crusty to woody, up to 45 mm (1.8 in) long and 4–9 mm (0.16–0.35 in) wide. The seeds are arranged transversely and are 3.7 mm (0.15 in) long.

== Taxonomy ==
Acacia auronitens was first formally described in 1839 by the botanist John Lindley in A Sketch of the Vegetation of the Swan River Colony. The specific epithet (aureonitens) means 'shining golden'.

== Distribution and habitat ==
This species of wattle occurs from near Perth to Mingenew in the Avon Wheatbelt, Geraldton Sandplains, Swan Coastal Plain bioregions of south-western Western Australia, where it grows in deep sand or sand over laterite in heath or shrubland, but occurs mainly in the Eneabba area.

== Conservation status ==
Acacia aureonitens is listed as 'Not threatened' by the Government of Western Australia Department of Biodiversity, Conservation and Attractions.

== See also ==
- List of Acacia species
