= Morrison Road =

Road in Perth, Western Australia

Morrison Road Western Australia

General information
- Type: Road
- Length: 6.5 km (4.0 mi)
- Route number(s): National Route 1 (Great Eastern Highway–Great Northern Highway)
- Tourist routes: Tourist Drive 203 (Great Eastern Highway–Great Northern Highway)

Major junctions
- West end: Amherst Road
- Great Eastern Highway (National Route 1 / State Route 51); Keane Street / Great Northern Highway (National Route 1); Roe Highway (National Highway 95 / State Route 3)
- East end: Swan View Road; Curve Road

Location(s)
- Major suburbs: Woodbridge, Midland, Midvale, Swan View

Morrison Road is a major road that runs through the suburbs of Woodbridge, Midland, Midvale and Swan View, in the east of Perth, Western Australia.

It connects with other major roads and highways including Roe Highway, Lloyd Street, Great Northern Highway and Great Eastern Highway. It also plays a major role in bringing in traffic into the Midland city centre.

With sections of the road originally named Woodbridge Terrace and Boundary Road, the road was later given the one name of Morrison Road after James Morrison, who was responsible for subdividing land along the southern side of the road in 1897.

The section west of Great Northern Highway is part of National Route 1. It connects the route from that highway to Great Eastern Highway.

== Major intersections ==
LGA	Location	km	mi	Destinations	Notes
Swan	Woodbridge	0	0.0	Amherst Road	
Swan	Midland–Woodbridge boundary	0.11	0.068	Great Eastern Highway (National Route 1 / State Route 51 / Tourist Drive 203)	Traffic light controlled; National Route 1 and Tourist Drive 203 concurrency terminus
Swan	Midland	1.3	0.81	Keane Street / Great Northern Highway (National Route 1 / Tourist Drive 203)	Traffic light controlled; National Route 1 and Tourist Drive 203 concurrency terminus
Swan	Midland	2.2	1.4	Lloyd Street	Traffic light controlled
Swan–Mundaring boundary	Midvale	3.4	2.1	Roe Highway (National Highway 95 / State Route 3)	Traffic light controlled
Swan–Mundaring boundary	Midvale	3.9	2.4	Farrall Road	Traffic light controlled
Swan–Mundaring boundary	Swan View	4.7	2.9	Myles Road	Traffic light controlled
Mundaring	Swan View	5.7	3.5	Talbot Road	Roundabout
Mundaring	Swan View	6.5	4.0	Swan Road / Pechey Road	Roundabout
Mundaring	Swan View	6.5	4.0	Swan View Road / Curve Road	Give way sign controlled, with Curve Road giving way; Morrison Road continues south as Swan View Road
1.000 mi = 1.609 km; 1.000 km = 0.621 mi: Concurrency terminus
