= Morrison Street =

Morrison Street may refer to:

- Morrison Street, Hong Kong, a street in Sheung Wan, Hong Kong
- Morrison Road, in Perth, Western Australia
- Wangfujing, in Beijing, formerly named Morrison Street
