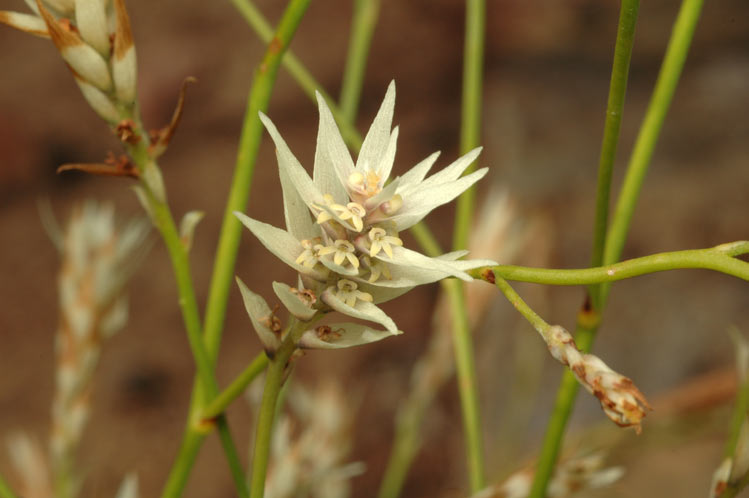
- Flowers

Scientific classification
- Kingdom: Plantae
- Clade: Tracheophytes
- Clade: Angiosperms
- Clade: Eudicots
- Order: Proteales
- Family: Proteaceae
- Genus: Conospermum
- Species: C. glumaceum

Binomial name
- Conospermum glumaceum Lindl.

Synonyms
- Conospermum lupulinum Endl.

= Conospermum glumaceum =

Hooded smokebush

Species of Australian shrub

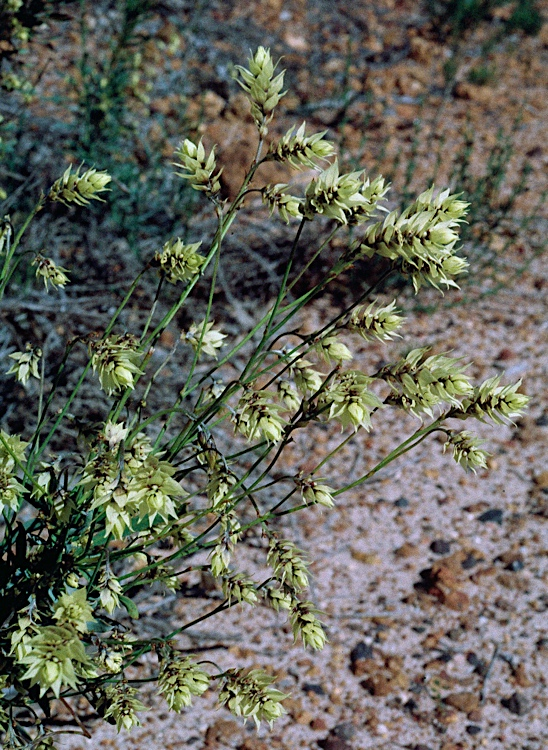
Habit

Conospermum glumaceum, commonly known as hooded smokebush, is a species of flowering plant in the family Proteaceae and is endemic to the south-west of Western Australia. It is an erect shrub with more or less clustered, linear leaves, and panicles of dense, head-like spikes of tube-shaped, cream-coloured flowers and white to golden nuts.

== Description ==
Conospermum glumaceum is an erect shrub that typically grows to a height of up to 0.5–1.7 m (1 ft 8 in – 5 ft 7 in) and does not form a lignotuber. Its leaves are linear, more or less clustered, 15–75 mm (0.59–2.95 in) long and 1–5 mm (0.039–0.197 in) wide with a small point on the tip. The flowers are borne in panicles in upper leaf axils, ending in dense, head-like spikes on a peduncle 15–40 mm (0.59–1.57 in) long. There are D-shaped to lance-shaped yellow bracteoles on the pedicels that age to brown. The flowers are cream-coloured, tube-shaped 0.75–1.7 mm (0.030–0.067 in) long. The upper lip of the perianth is egg-shaped, 0.8–1.3 mm (0.031–0.051 in) long, 0.75–1.2 mm (0.030–0.047 in) wide, and curved backwards, the lower lip joined for 0.5–1.3 mm (0.020–0.051 in) with oblong lobes 0.6–1.0 mm (0.024–0.039 in) long. Flowering occurs from September to November, and the fruit is a nut 2.7–3.0 mm (0.11–0.12 in) long and 2.0–2.4 mm (0.079–0.094 in) wide and covered with shaggy white to golden hairs.

== Taxonomy ==
Conospermum glumaceum was first formally described in John Lindley's 1839 A Sketch of the Vegetation of the Swan River Colony, based on unspecified material. Lindley referred to it as a "strange species" that "has altogether the appearance of some Bupleurum with great membranous bracts." The specific epithet (glumaceum) means glumaceous, referring to the bracts enclosing each flower.

== Distribution and habitat ==
This species of Conospermum grows in lateritic soils in hilly terrain, between Eneabba and Red Hill in Western Australia in the Avon Wheatbelt, Geraldton Sandplains, Jarrah Forest, and Swan Coastal Plain biogeographic regions.

== Conservation status ==
Hooded smokebush is listed as "not threatened" by the Government of Western Australia Department of Biodiversity, Conservation and Attractions.
