= Herne Hill, Australia =

In Australia, Herne Hill may refer to:

- Herne Hill, Victoria, a residential suburb of Geelong
- Herne Hill, Western Australia, a suburb of Perth
