= Red Hill, Western Australia =

Red Hill
- Suburb
- Interactive map of Red Hill
- Coordinates: 31.849°S 116.068°E
- Country: Australia
- State: Western Australia
- City: Perth, Western Australia
- LGA: City of Swan
- Location: 26 km (16 mi) NE of Perth

Government
  - State electorate: Swan Hills
  - Federal division: Division of Hasluck

Area
  - Total: 49.1 km^{2} (19.0 sq mi)

Population
  - Total: 85 (SAL 2021)
- Postcode: 6056
Suburbs around Red Hill
Millendon	Baskerville	Gidgegannup
Herne Hill	Red Hill	Hovea
Middle Swan	Jane Brook	Hovea

Red Hill is a suburb of Perth, Western Australia. It has Toodyay Road pass through it on the way up the Darling Scarp. It is in the City of Swan local government area. At the 2011 Australian Census the suburb recorded a population of 98.

The suburb includes a regional landfill, Red Hill Waste Management Facility, which is managed by the Eastern Metropolitan Regional Council.
