= Golden Pipeline Heritage Trail =

Trail from Perth to Kalgoorlie in Western Australia

Golden Pipeline Heritage Trail route marker

Golden Pipeline Heritage Trail (also known as the Golden Pipeline Drive Trail) was a project conducted by the National Trust of Western Australia along the Goldfields Water Supply Scheme pipeline at the time the pipeline was being celebrated for its 100 years of operation.

== Project ==
The project included the creation of guide books, web sites and other materials about the trail.

The project was initiated in the late 1990s; further material was developed between 2001 and 2003, and included the Kep Track as part of the project.

== Trail and related sites ==
Some communities along the trail have suffered due to change in agricultural decline, however most communities sustain museums or interpretative signage that give information about the pipeline's history.

As the heritage trail and working pipeline are continuing, considerable effort was expended to maintain and sustain the pipeline trail and its related sites (former pumping stations for example) over time.

The heritage trail achieved status on the Australian national heritage list in 2011.

== Trail sections ==
The Golden Pipeline Heritage Trail is segmented into seven sections:

1. Mundaring (Note: Location of historical pump stations 1 and 2) to Northam
2. Northam to Cunderdin (Note: Location of historical pump station 3)
3. Cunderdin to Kellerberrin
4. Kellerberrin to Merredin (Note: Location of historical pump station 4)
5. Merredin to Southern Cross
6. Southern Cross to Coolgardie
7. Coolgardie to Kalgoorlie

== See also ==
- Great Eastern Highway, the road that most of the Golden Pipeline Heritage Trail follows
