= Hovea, Western Australia =

Hovea
- Suburb
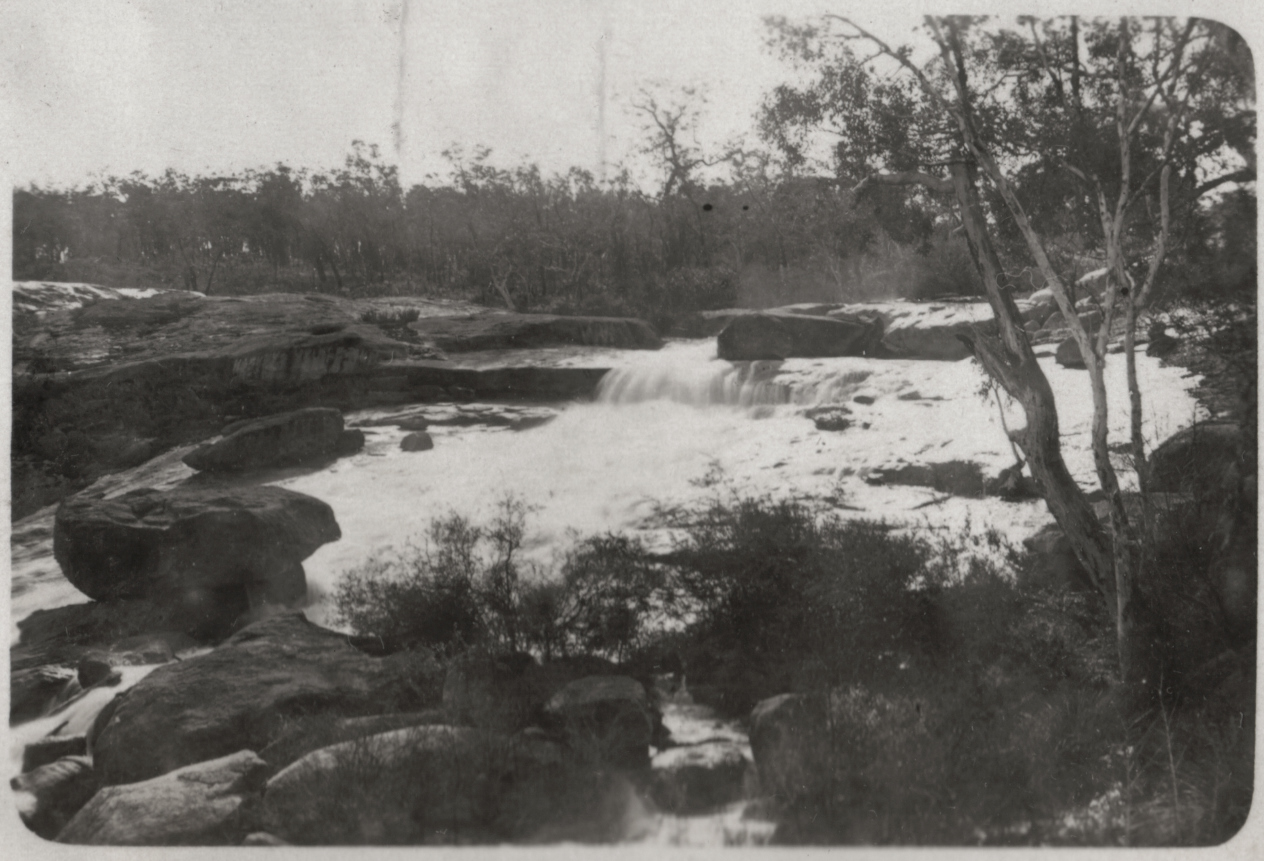
- Hovea falls, Western Australia, ca. 1926
- Interactive map of Hovea
- Coordinates: 31.874°S 116.107°E
- Country: Australia
- State: Western Australia
- City: Perth, Western Australia
- LGA: Shire of Mundaring

Government
  - State electorate: Swan Hills
  - Federal division: Hasluck

Population
  - Total: 713 (SAL 2021)
- Postcode: 6071
Suburbs around Hovea
Jane Brook	Red Hill	Parkerville
Swan View	Hovea	Parkerville
Greenmount	Glen Forrest	Mahogany Creek

Hovea is a suburb in the Shire of Mundaring in Perth, Western Australia.

It is centred on Jane Brook and encompasses the Railway Reserve Heritage Trail (formerly the Eastern Railway) and John Forrest National Park.

Hovea extends as far north as Toodyay Road, and south to Glen Forrest and Great Eastern Highway. Its western boundary is also the western boundary of the park. Hovea (named for a native Australian flowering plant) was originally named Park View, but the name was changed in 1912 to avoid confusion between Park View, Swan View, National Park and Bellevue, all nearby railway stations.

== Transport ==
=== Bus ===
Bus routes serving Great Eastern Highway:

- 320 Midland Station to Mundaring
- 321 and 322 Midland Station to Glen Forrest
- 328 Midland Station to Chidlow
