= Bailup, Western Australia =

Bailup
- Town
- Coordinates: 31.740°S 116.31°E
- Country: Australia
- State: Western Australia
- LGA(s): Shire of Mundaring; Shire of Toodyay
- Location: 62 km (39 mi) from Perth; 27 km (17 mi) from Toodyay; 13 km (8.1 mi) from Wooroloo

Government
  - State electorate(s): Swan Hills; Central Wheatbelt
  - Federal division(s): Pearce

Area
  - Total: 47 km^{2} (18 sq mi)

Population
  - Total(s): 54 (SAL 2021)
- Postcode: 6082

Bailup is a Western Australian locality and rural residential estate located 62 kilometres (39 mi) northeast of the state capital, Perth, along Toodyay Road. The population recorded at the 2021 census was 54. The area is split between the Shire of Toodyay and Shire of Mundaring, the latter of which contains most of the Bailup area.

== History ==
Bailup was named after a nearby creek and a police station and inn established on Toodyay Road in the 1840s. The name is of Noongar origin but its meaning is unclear. The name was approved in early 1999 by the Department of Land Administration.

== Description ==
Most of the locality is covered in open jarrah, marri and wandoo woodland, with some areas of dense understorey vegetation. Nearby Morangup Hill (31°39′31″S 116°18′55″E), the main feature of a reserve managed by the Department of Environment and Conservation (DEC) on the edge of the Avon Valley National Park, is a granite peak providing extensive views over the surrounding area and is home to several species of birds including the square-tailed kite. The Red Swamp Brook, which runs through Bailup, feeds a significant wetland area.

== Transport ==
The main road route through the area is Toodyay Road (State Route 50). Bailup Road links Bailup to Wooroloo further south. No public transport is available.
