= Viveash, Western Australia =

Viveash Perth, Western Australia
- Coordinates: 31.879°S 115.997°E
- Population: 1,280 (SAL 2021)
- Postcode(s): 6056
- LGA(s): City of Swan
- State electorate(s): Midland
- Federal division(s): Hasluck
Suburbs around Viveash:
Caversham	Caversham	Caversham
Caversham	Viveash	Middle Swan
Caversham	Woodbridge	Midland

Viveash is an eastern suburb of Perth, Western Australia, in the City of Swan. It was named after Samuel Waterman Viveash, the owner of the land in this area in the 1840s. He came to the Swan River Colony on Britomart, which sailed from Spithead on 3 July 1838 and arrived at Fremantle on 5 December 1838, and took up land in the Avon Land District. A copy of Viveash's diaries for the period 1838 to 1851 can be accessed at the University of Western Australia Library. The suburban area of Viveash was developed by Midland Brick, which carried out subdivision in 1967, and requested in 1968 that the area be named after Viveash.
