= Millendon, Western Australia =

Millendon Perth, Western Australia
- Coordinates: 31.806°S 116.040°E
- Population: 490 (SAL 2021)
- Postcode(s): 6056
- LGA(s): City of Swan
- State electorate(s): Swan Hills
- Federal division(s): Hasluck
Suburbs around Millendon:
Belhus	Upper Swan	Brigadoon
Henley Brook	Millendon	Herne Hill
Henley Brook	Herne Hill	Herne Hill

Millendon is a suburb of Perth, Western Australia in the City of Swan local government area. The area has several wineries that make the Swan Valley popular for its wine production.

== Wineries ==
- Lamont's
- Neilson's Estate

== Transport ==
=== Bus ===
- 310 Midland Station to Ellenbrook Station – serves Great Northern Highway
- 312 Midland Station to Midland Station – Circular Route, serves Railway Crescent and Campersic Road
