= Midland, Western Australia =

Midland
- Suburb
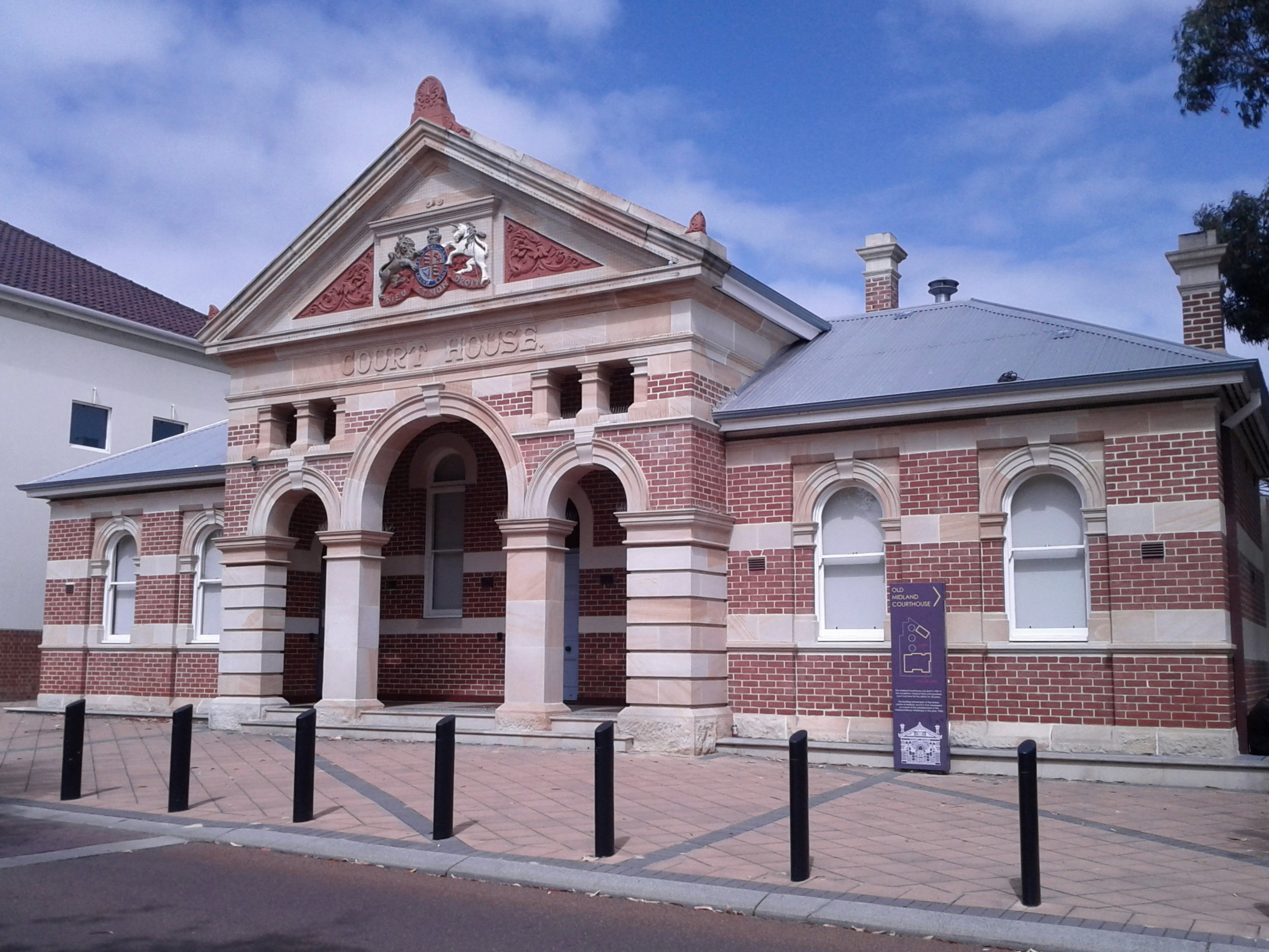
- The Old Midland Courthouse
- Interactive map of Midland
- Coordinates: 31.888°S 116.010°E
- Country: Australia
- State: Western Australia
- City: Perth
- LGA: City of Swan
- Established: 1890s

Government
  - State electorate: Midland
  - Federal division: Hasluck

Population
  - Total: 6,335 (SAL 2021)
- Postcode: 6056
Suburbs around Midland
| Viveash | Middle Swan | Midvale |
| Woodbridge | Midland | Midvale |
| Hazelmere | Hazelmere | Bellevue |

Midland is a suburb and historic town of Perth, Western Australia, located 15 km (9.3 mi) northeast of Perth's central business district. It is the administrative seat and commercial centre of the City of Swan local government area. It is also a designated strategic metropolitan centre for the larger Perth metropolitan area.

== History ==
=== Railway ===
Midland was the site of the Midland Railway Workshops - the main workshops for the Western Australian Government Railways for over 80 years. It was also a terminus for the Midland Railway Company. At the end of the Second World War it was the junction of the Midland Railway, the Upper Darling Range railway, and the main Eastern Railway.

The Transperth suburban railway system has a terminus at Midland station. As part of the Metronet program, there are plans to potentially extend this service further to the nearby suburb of Bellevue.

Until 1966 the earlier railway station at Midland was the connecting location for trains to Bellevue and then onto Chidlow. Prior to 1954 it included the passenger service from the Mundaring Loop - or the original Eastern Railway (Western Australia), which went through Mundaring, Glen Forrest and Darlington. Until 1949 the passenger service to Kalamunda on the Upper Darling Range railway was still operating via the Kalamunda Zig Zag at Gooseberry Hill to Midland.

=== Commercial ===
Midland Junction developed around the Town Hall (1906) and Post Office (1913) sites and spread slowly east and north for over 70 years. The centrality of the main services, and the unusual presence of the Midland Railway Company sheds and yard directly adjacent to the Town Hall and Post Office, combined with the Government Railway Workshops, gave a focused sense of location to the commercial centre, and the local residences. The commercialisation of Great Eastern Highway roadfront residential properties to Bellevue was not complete before the 1990s.

In 1909, Midland Junction was one of four towns in Australia to receive a grant for a Carnegie library, which opened in 1911, using the former Midland Public Hall building. The library served until 1963 and was demolished in 1966.

In the 1970s the development of Midland Gate Shopping Centre completely changed the focus of the community, with businesses traditionally within walking distance of the Post Office and Railway Station closing down or shifting over the following decades. The re-development of the Midland Gate Shopping Centre has reasserted the car oriented nature of the regional centre, and the old centre of Midland is currently undergoing revitalisation and redevelopment with mixed use commercial and residential property providing the main focus.

== Townsite ==
Midland's townsite is based around both Great Eastern Highway, which carries east bound traffic, and Victoria Street, which carries westbound traffic. It is possible to transfer from one to the other via the Padbury Terrace intersection to access Great Eastern Highway from Victoria Street, or use Helena Street to complete the reverse. Cale Street which forms the perimeter of the Midland Gate Shopping Centre also provides this access.

The townsite is lively and becoming increasingly busy attracting commuters from a wide surrounding area. Commercial and retail trade has been expanded further east on Great Eastern Highway. Continuing development in commercial and residential property within the original townsite means that despite the age of the townsite, it has taken on a modern character which blends seamlessly with the original and it is the main port of call for eastern travellers who do not bypass the historical area via Roe Highway.

== Transport ==
=== Bus ===
- 290 and 291 Midland Station to Redcliffe Station – serve Victoria Street, Great Eastern Highway and Helena Street
- 300 Midland Station to Midland Station (free service) – Circular Route, serves Great Eastern Highway, The Crescent, Keane Street, Old Great Northern Highway and Helena Street
- 301 Midland Station to Midland Station – Circular Route, serves Yelverton Drive and Centennial Place
- 308 Midland Station to Midland Station – Circular Route, serves Helena Street, The Crescent, Hamersley Street, Margaret Street, Great Northern Highway and Muriel Street
- 310 Midland Station to Ellenbrook Station – serves Helena Street, The Crescent, Hamersley Street, Margaret Street and Great Northern Highway
- 312 Midland Station to Midland Station – Circular Route, serves Helena Street, The Crescent, Hamersley Street, Margaret Street and Great Northern Highway
- 314 and 315 Midland Station to Midland Station – Clockwise Circular Routes, serve Helena Street, The Crescent, Lloyd Street and Morrison Road
- 322 Midland Station to Glen Forrest – serves Great Eastern Highway, Victoria Street, Lloyd Street and Clayton Street
- 324 and 325 Midland Station to Midland Station – Anti-Clockwise Circular Routes, serve Helena Street, The Crescent, Morrison Road and Lloyd Street
- 326 Midland Station to Midland Station – Circular Route, serves Great Eastern Highway, Morrison Road, The Crescent, Helena Street
- 358 and 359 Midland Station to Whiteman Park Station – serve Helena Street, The Crescent and Lloyd Street

Bus routes serving Great Eastern Highway and Victoria Street:

- 320 Midland Station to Mundaring
- 321 Midland Station to Glen Forrest
- 328 Midland Station to Chidlow

Bus routes serving Great Eastern Highway, Victoria Street, Lloyd Street, Clayton Street and Military Road:

- 277 and 278 Midland Station to High Wycombe Station
- 307 Midland Station to Kalamunda Bus Station

Bus routes serving Helena Street, The Crescent and Morrison Road:

- 313 Midland Station to Jane Brook
- 323 Midland Station to Swan View
- 327 Midland Station to Swan View Shopping Centre

=== Rail ===
- Midland Line
  - Midland Station

== Redevelopment ==
It currently is being re-developed in part by the Midland Redevelopment Authority, which is organising redevelopment of the Railway Workshops site. Although some museum and storage facilities are being developed at the old workshops site, most of the massive railway superstructure and presence in Midland has gone. The Redevelopment Authority has under its act been vested with lands that do not fully encompass the whole 'old town' of Midland, but only parts of it.

The Midland Saleyards which are at the eastern end of the Railway Workshop site have been in the process of closing and all the related businesses and properties are in the process of being relocated and redeveloped. The Midland Military Markets at the northern edge of the Midland Saleyards - literally utilised an old Military site for a weekend market. The markets were destroyed by fire on 25 April 2007. Not far west and adjacent to the Lloyd Street railway crossing - a large Harvey Norman store was opened in 2005 on the corner of Clayton and Lloyd Streets.

Parts of the Midland Railway Workshops site are home to a large Western Australian Police Operations Centre, Curtin University’s Midland Campus, as well as other projects. The Coal Storage dam at the western side of the Workshops has become an ornamental lake adjacent to residential redevelopment called 'Woodbridge Lakes'.

In November 2005 the State Government announced plans to construct a 326-bed hospital on the site of the old railway workshops. The new hospital, to replace the aging Swan District Hospital, was predicted to be open by 2011 at a cost of A$182.7 million. The hospital was opened on 20 November 2015 by Premier Colin Barnett, with operations beginning on 24 November.

== Notable people from Midland ==
- Ralph Sarich: engineer, inventor and entrepreneur
- Keith Slater: Australian cricketer and Australian rules footballer
- Ken Bagley: Australian rules footballer
- Jack Wong Sue: Chinese Australian soldier, mariner, author and entrepreneur
- Albert Facey: author of the auto-biography - A Fortunate Life
- Bruce Yardley: Australian cricketer
- Mike Richardson - Australian rules footballer
- Garry Sidebottom: Australian rules footballer
- Ian Williams - Australian rules footballer
- Allan Cuthbertson: actor
- Simon Katich: Australian cricketer
- Jessica Gomes: international model
- Cameron Meyer: Australian cyclist
- Travis Meyer: Australian cyclist
- Nic Naitanui: Australian rules footballer - West Coast Eagles
- Stephen Coniglio: Australian rules footballer - Greater Western Sydney Giants
- Michael Walters: Australian rules footballer - Fremantle Football Club

== See also ==
- Midland Junction Municipality
- Swan Express
