= Herne Hill, Western Australia =

Herne Hill Perth, Western Australia
- Coordinates: 31.824°S 116.03°E
- Population: 1,542 (SAL 2021)
- Postcode(s): 6056
- LGA(s): City of Swan
- State electorate(s): Swan Hills
- Federal division(s): Hasluck
Suburbs around Herne Hill:
| Brigadoon | Gidgegannup | Gidgegannup |
| Henley Brook and Millendon | Herne Hill | Gidgegannup |
| West Swan and Middle Swan | Red Hill and Jane Brook | Gidgegannup |

Herne Hill is a suburb of Perth, Western Australia within the City of Swan local government area. The area has several wineries that make the Swan Valley popular for its wine production.

== Wineries ==
Carilley Estate, Highway Wines, Talijancich Wines, Valley Wines, Romato Wines, Windy Creek Estate.

== Community facilities ==
- Minh Quang Meditation Institute, a Vietnamese Buddhist temple is located in the suburb.

== Schools ==
Herne Hill Primary School
