= Jane Brook, Western Australia =

Suburb of Perth, Western Australia

Jane Brook
- Suburb
- Interactive map of Jane Brook
- Coordinates: 31.86°S 116.061°E
- Country: Australia
- State: Western Australia
- City: Perth
- LGA: City of Swan

Government
  - State electorate: Midland
  - Federal division: Bullwinkel

Population
  - Total: 3,670 (SAL 2021)
- Postcode: 6056
Suburbs around Jane Brook
Middle Swan	Herne Hill and Red Hill	Herne Hill
Middle Swan	Jane Brook	Hovea
Stratton	Swan View	Hovea

Jane Brook is a suburb of Perth, Western Australia, situated approximately 25 kilometres (16 mi) north-east of the Perth CBD. It is a suburb within the City of Swan.

== Watercourse and valley ==
It is also the name of a watercourse and the valley that passes through the Darling Scarp, and which was utilised for the Eastern Railway and subsequently a central part of the John Forrest National Park.

== Local attractions ==
There are a number of fine wineries located near Jane Brook, producing premium hand-crafted wines. Most have restaurants serving lunch and dinner. The nearest major shopping precinct is located in Midland, approximately 5 kilometres (3.1 mi) to the west.
