= Gidgegannup, Western Australia =

Gidgegannup
- Suburb
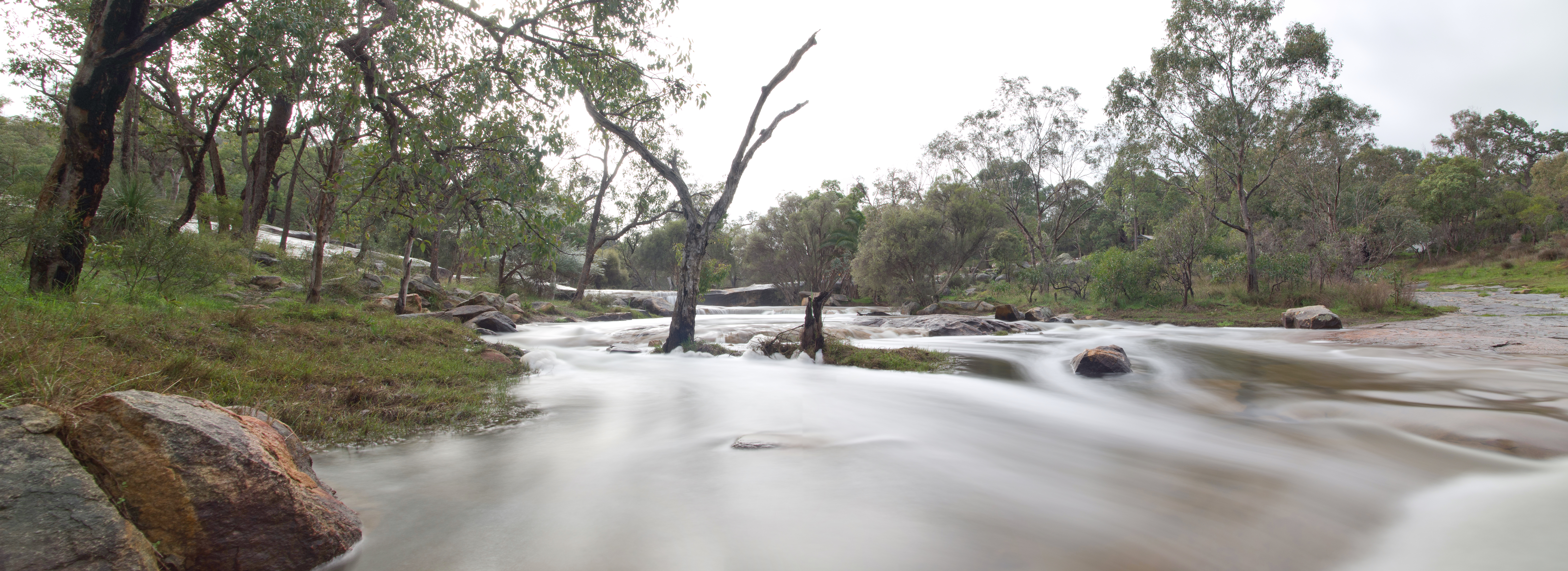
- Noble Falls
- Interactive map of Gidgegannup
- Coordinates: 31.792°S 116.198°E
- Country: Australia
- State: Western Australia
- LGA: City of Swan
- Location: 40 km (25 mi) NE of Perth

Government
  - State electorate: Swan Hills
  - Federal division: Bullwinkel

Area
  - Total: 333.5 km^{2} (128.8 sq mi)

Population
  - Total: 2,818 (SAL 2021)
- Postcode: 6083
Suburbs around Gidgegannup
Bullsbrook	Julimar	Morangup
Brigadoon and Herne Hill	Gidgegannup	Wooroloo
Hovea and Parkerville	Stoneville and Mount Helena	Chidlow

Gidgegannup is a township 40 kilometres (25 mi) northeast of Perth, the capital city of Western Australia. The name Gidgegannup comes from a Noongar word meaning "Place where spears are made", and was first recorded by passing surveyors in 1852.

The townsite is situated on Toodyay Road. The locality is drained by the north flowing Wooroloo and Gidgegannup Brooks. Due to low density development, considerable amounts of natural vegetation remain in the area - and the roads to the north of Toodyay Road (O'Brien, Clenton and Berry, and Reen Roads) have been designated Wildflower Scenic Drive.

The Gidgegannup Agricultural Society has held over 60 shows at the Gidgegannup showgrounds.

== Population ==
In the 2016 Australian census, there were 2,743 people in Gidgegannup. 71.8% of people were born in Australia. The next most common country of birth was England at 9.6%. The most common responses for religion were No Religion 37.9%, Anglican 20.4% and Catholic 15.9%.

== Localities ==
Gidgegannup has several official and non-official localities of note.

- Tilden Park
- Hampton Estate
- Paruna (Birkner Estate)
- Noble Falls
