= Stratton, Western Australia =

Stratton
- Suburb
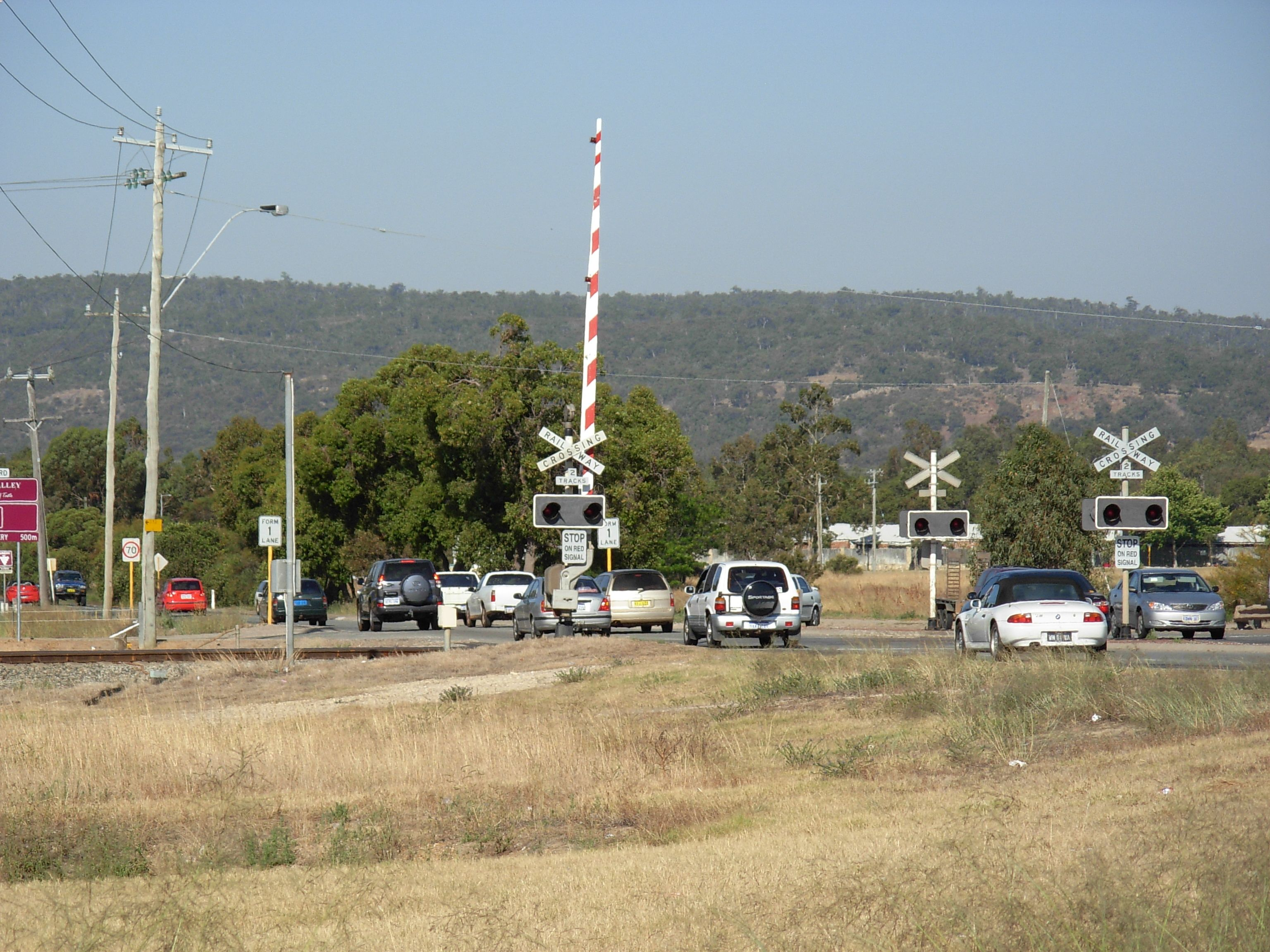
- Toodyay Road railway crossing, adjacent to Reid Highway, Stratton, Western Australia
- Interactive map of Stratton
- Coordinates: 31.865°S 116.039°E
- Country: Australia
- State: Western Australia
- City: Perth
- LGA: City of Swan

Government
  - State electorate: Midland
  - Federal division: Bullwinkel

Population
  - Total: 3,267 (SAL 2021)
- Postcode: 6056
Suburbs around Stratton
Middle Swan	Middle Swan	Jane Brook
Middle Swan	Stratton	Jane Brook
Midvale	Swan View	Swan View

Stratton is a mostly residential eastern suburb of Perth, Western Australia, located within the City of Swan. It was formerly known as Wexcombe; the name Stratton was chosen in 1989 to honour John Peter Stratton, a farmer, businessman and local landowner who was president of the Western Australian Trotting Association from 1930 until 1966.
