= City of Swan =

Coordinates: 31°53′42″S 115°59′35″E

- Local government area
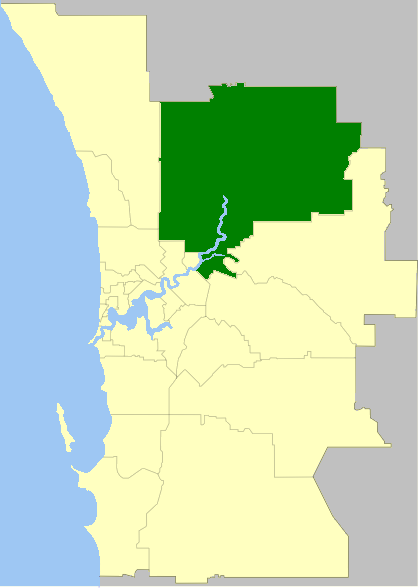
- The City of Swan within the Perth Metropolitan Area

- Interactive map of City of Swan
- Country: Australia
- State: Western Australia
- Region: Eastern Metropolitan Perth, Swan Valley
- Established: 1970
- Council seat: Midland

Government
  - Mayor: Tanya Richardson
  - State electorate: Bassendean, Midland, Swan Hills, West Swan, Mirrabooka
  - Federal division: Swan, Cowan, Durack, Hasluck, Pearce

Area
  - Total: 1,042 km^{2} (402 sq mi)

Population
  - Total: 152,974 (LGA 2021)
- Website: City of Swan
LGAs around City of Swan
Wanneroo	Chittering	Toodyay
Wanneroo	City of Swan	Mundaring
Stirling	Bayswater; Bassendean	Kalamunda

The City of Swan is a local government area of Western Australia, in the eastern metropolitan region of Perth. It is named after the Swan River which traverses most of the City's urban area.

Swan is centred approximately 20 km north-east of the Perth central business district. It covers 42 suburbs and localities across an area of 1,042 km^{2}, making it the largest metropolitan LGA by area. It had an estimated population of 155,653 in 2020.

The historic, administrative, commercial and industrial centre of Swan is Midland, a satellite city and strategic metropolitan centre of Perth. Other key areas of the City include the historic colonial town of Guildford, the Swan Valley tourism and winery region and the new town of Ellenbrook.

== History ==
The City of Swan is the modern-day descendant of the Swan Road District, founded in 1871. The current organisation was created on 20 February 1970 as the Shire of Swan, after the forced amalgamation of the Shire of Swan-Guildford and the Town of Midland.

The Shire gained 'City' status on 25 April 2000.

On 1 July 2016 the portion of Noranda north of Widgee Road was transferred to the City of Bayswater.

== Wards ==
The City of Swan is divided into 5 wards, most of which have three Councillors:

- Altone Ward (3 Councillors)
- Midland/Guildford Ward (3 Councillors)
- Pearce Ward (4 Councillors)
- Swan Valley/Gidgegannup Ward (2 Councillors)
- Whiteman Ward (3 Councillors)

== Councillors ==
The Following table shows the Council of the City of Swan as of July 2022:
Councillor	Ward	Term Expiry	Notes
Haeden Miles	Whiteman	2023	
Aaron Bowman	Pearce	2025	
Amanda Dorn	Altone	2027	
Jagdip Singh	Altone	2025	
Cate McCullough	Pearce	2023	
Charlie Zannino	Swan Valley/Gidgegannup	2025	
Dave Knight	Whiteman	2025	
Ian Johnson	Midland/Guildford	2027	Deputy Mayor
Evia Aringo	Pearce	2027	
Jennifer Catalano	Altone	2025	
Patty Jones	Pearce	2025	
Rashelle Predovnik	Midland/Guildford	2027	
Rod Henderson	Swan Valley/Gidgegannup	2027	
Sarah Howlett	Midland/Guildford	2025	
Tanya Richardson	Pearce	2027	Mayor

== Suburbs ==
The suburbs of the City of Swan with population and size figures based on the most recent Australian census:

Suburb	Population	Area	Map
Aveley	13,998 (SAL 2021)	6.1 km^{2} (2.4 sq mi)	
Avon Valley National Park ‡	5 (SAL 2021)	75 km^{2} (29 sq mi)	
Ballajura	18,459 (SAL 2021)	8.9 km^{2} (3.4 sq mi)	
Baskerville	302 (SAL 2021)	7.7 km^{2} (3.0 sq mi)	
Beechboro	9,112 (SAL 2021)	4.9 km^{2} (1.9 sq mi)	
Belhus	264 (SAL 2021)	4 km^{2} (1.5 sq mi)	
Bellevue	1,514 (SAL 2021)	3 km^{2} (1.2 sq mi)	
Bennett Springs	5,929 (SAL 2021)	4.4 km^{2} (1.7 sq mi)	
Brabham	8,665 (SAL 2021)	6.5 km^{2} (2.5 sq mi)	
Brigadoon	1,025 (SAL 2021)	20 km^{2} (7.7 sq mi)	
Bullsbrook	5,605 (SAL 2021)	253.8 km^{2} (98.0 sq mi)	
Bushmead	677 (SAL 2021)	3.2 km^{2} (1.2 sq mi)	
Caversham	7,419 (SAL 2021)	11.6 km^{2} (4.5 sq mi)	
Cullacabardee	45 (SAL 2021)	14.8 km^{2} (5.7 sq mi)	
Dayton	5,507 (SAL 2021)	2.8 km^{2} (1.1 sq mi)	
Ellenbrook	24,668 (SAL 2021)	13.1 km^{2} (5.1 sq mi)	
Gidgegannup	2,818 (SAL 2021)	303.7 km^{2} (117.3 sq mi)	
Guildford	2,040 (SAL 2021)	3.2 km^{2} (1.2 sq mi)	
Hazelmere	935 (SAL 2021)	7.3 km^{2} (2.8 sq mi)	
Henley Brook	2,500 (SAL 2021)	7.3 km^{2} (2.8 sq mi)	
Herne Hill	1,542 (SAL 2021)	17.1 km^{2} (6.6 sq mi)	
Jane Brook	3,670 (SAL 2021)	5.3 km^{2} (2.0 sq mi)	
Kiara	1,776 (SAL 2021)	1.4 km^{2} (0.54 sq mi)	
Koongamia	985 (SAL 2021)	0.6 km^{2} (0.23 sq mi)	
Lexia	30 (SAL 2021)	25.8 km^{2} (10.0 sq mi)	
Lockridge	3,322 (SAL 2021)	1.4 km^{2} (0.54 sq mi)	
Malaga	25 (SAL 2021)	6.6 km^{2} (2.5 sq mi)	
Melaleuca	0 (SAL 2016)	78.8 km^{2} (30.4 sq mi)	
Middle Swan	2,852 (SAL 2021)	12.8 km^{2} (4.9 sq mi)	
Midland	6,335 (SAL 2021)	4.4 km^{2} (1.7 sq mi)	
Midvale	2,283 (SAL 2021)	2.9 km^{2} (1.1 sq mi)	
Millendon	490 (SAL 2021)	6.9 km^{2} (2.7 sq mi)	
Perth Airport *	25 (SAL 2021)	19.2 km^{2} (7.4 sq mi)	
Red Hill	85 (SAL 2021)	15.7 km^{2} (6.1 sq mi)	
South Guildford	3,781 (SAL 2021)	5.8 km^{2} (2.2 sq mi)	
Stratton	3,267 (SAL 2021)	2.3 km^{2} (0.89 sq mi)	
Swan View	7,889 (SAL 2021)	7.5 km^{2} (2.9 sq mi)	
The Vines	5,848 (SAL 2021)	6.6 km^{2} (2.5 sq mi)	
Upper Swan	549 (SAL 2021)	19.8 km^{2} (7.6 sq mi)	
Viveash	1,280 (SAL 2021)	2.1 km^{2} (0.81 sq mi)	
Walyunga National Park ‡	0 (SAL 2021)	18 km^{2} (6.9 sq mi)	
West Swan	786 (SAL 2021)	6.6 km^{2} (2.5 sq mi)	
Whiteman	10 (SAL 2021)	27.7 km^{2} (10.7 sq mi)	
Woodbridge	1,207 (SAL 2021)	1.4 km^{2} (0.54 sq mi)	

- ( * indicates suburb partially located within City)
- ( ‡ indicates boundaries of national park and locality are not identical)

== Population ==
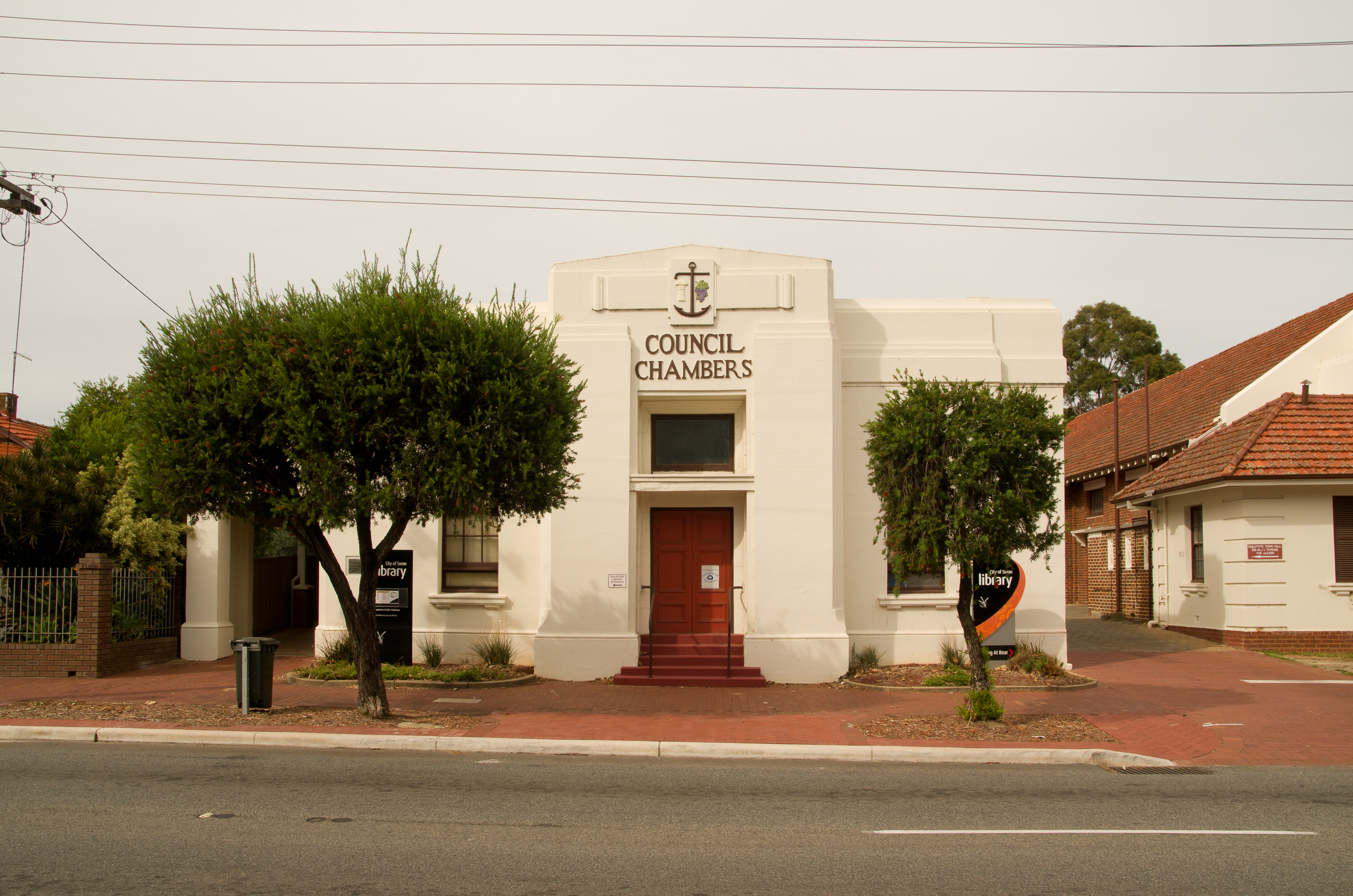
Original Council Chambers in Guildford

=== Population of antecedent councils ===
Year	Total	Swan	Guildford	Midland
1911	6,982	1,829	1,669	3,484
1921	9,188	2,375	1,876	4,937
1933	10,948	3,501	2,039	5,408
1947	13,446	5,047	2,217	6,182
1954	17,996	7,366	2,134	8,496
1961	18,653	9,397		9,256
1966	19,135	9,800		9,335

=== Population of the unified City of Swan ===
Historical population

Year	Pop.	±%
1911	6,982	—
1921	9,188	+31.6%
1933	10,948	+19.2%
1947	13,446	+22.8%
1954	17,996	+33.8%
1961	18,653	+3.7%
1966	19,135	+2.6%
1971	25,682	+34.2%
1976	26,932	+4.9%

Year	Pop.	±%
1981	31,859	+18.3%
1986	37,383	+17.3%
1991	52,968	+41.7%
1996	68,795	+29.9%
2001	82,126	+19.4%
2006	93,279	+13.6%
2011	108,461	+16.3%
2016	133,851	+23.4%
2021	152,974	+14.3%

=== Demographics ===
32.7% of the City of Swan population was born overseas, compared with 36.1% for Greater Perth.

The largest non-English speaking country of birth in the City of Swan was India, where 3.1% of the population, or 4,163 people, were born.

== Heritage-listed places ==
As of 2024, 676 places are heritage-listed in the City of Swan, of which 317 are on the State Register of Heritage Places, among them the Garrick Theatre, Guildford Grammar School Chapel and the Midland Railway Workshops.
