= Middle Swan, Western Australia =

Middle Swan Perth, Western Australia
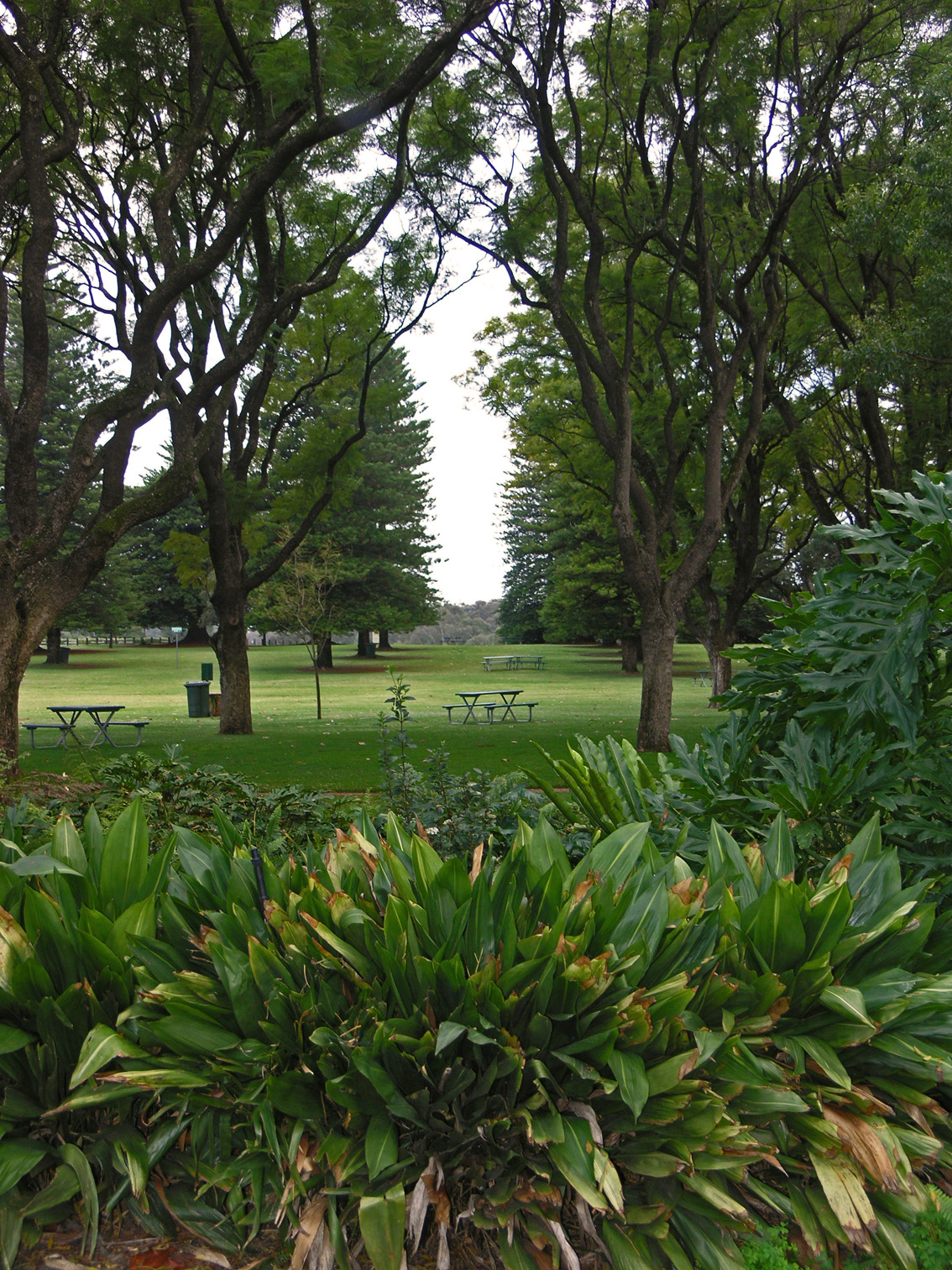
- Houghtons Winery, Middle Swan
- Coordinates: 31.853°S 116.02°E
- Population: 2,852 (SAL 2021)
- Postcode(s): 6056
- LGA(s): City of Swan
- State electorate(s): Swan Hills
- Federal division(s): Hasluck
Suburbs around Middle Swan:
West Swan	Herne Hill	Herne Hill
West Swan and Caversham	Middle Swan	Red Hill and Jane Brook
Viveash and Midland	Midvale	Stratton

Middle Swan is a suburb of Perth, Western Australia, and forms part of the City of Swan local government area. The suburb is bordered to the west by the Swan River. The suburb is most notable for its various wineries, including Nikola Estate that was once known as Houghton and Sandalford. It also has the Midland brickworks within its boundaries, as well as an accommodation facility (Swanleigh Residential College, which closed in 2010) for country students attending the Governor Stirling Senior High School and Swan Christian College.

== Notable people from Middle Swan ==
- Simon Katich, Test cricketer
- William Mitchell, the first rector of the Swan Parish
