= Clackline Bridge =

Road bridge in Clackline, Western Australia

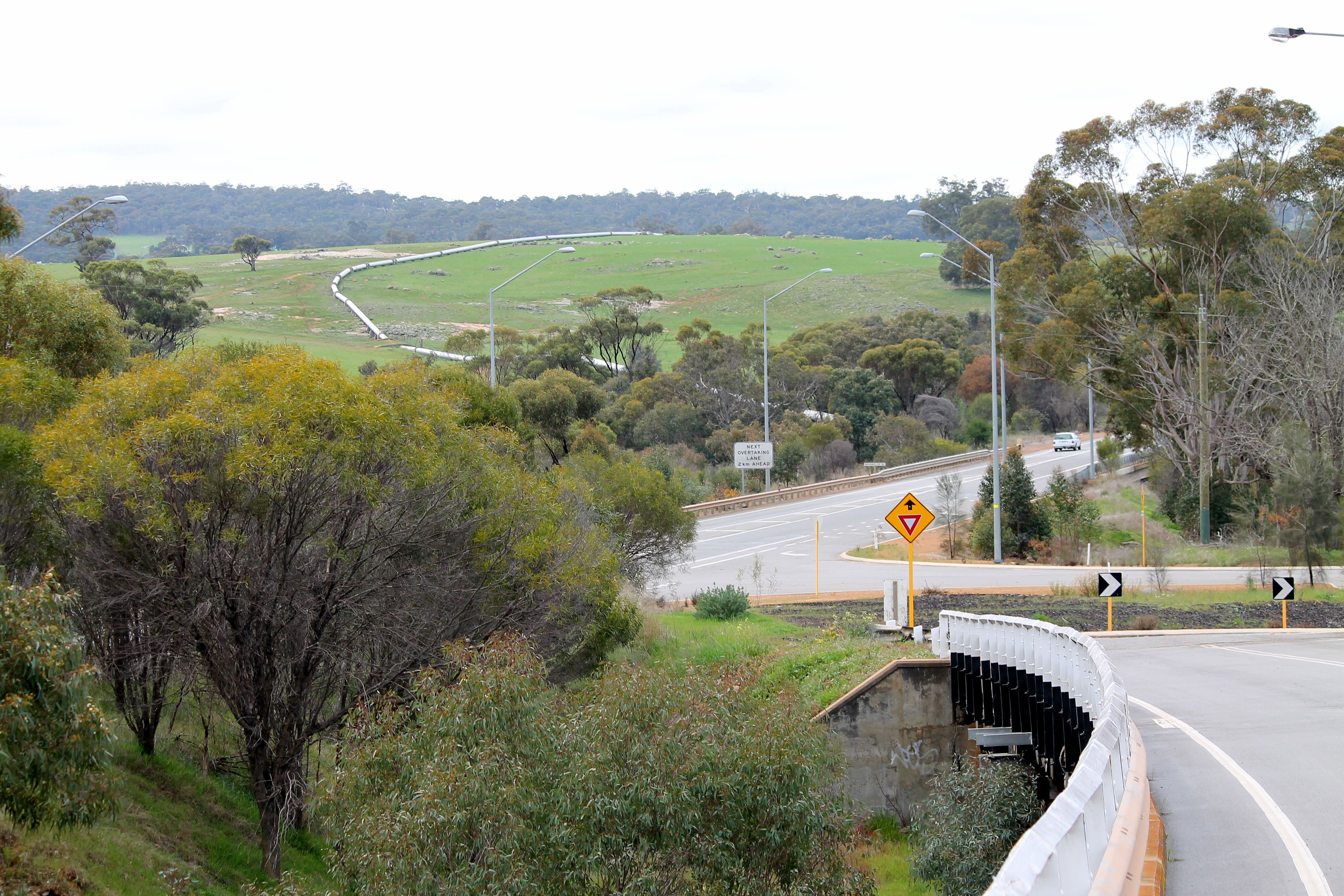
- View along Clackline Bridge in 2012, with the Goldfields Pipeline visible in the background
- Coordinates: 31.7206°S 116.5218°E
- Carries: Motor vehicles
- Crosses: Clackline Brook
- Locale: Clackline, Western Australia
- Owner: State of Western Australia
- Maintained by: Main Roads Western Australia and Shire of Northam
- Heritage status: State Heritage Register permanent entry
- Structure Number: 0608

Characteristics
- Design: Inclined curvilinear
- Material: Timber
- Total length: 133.6 m (438 ft)
- Width: 8.98 m (29.5 ft)
- Longest span: 14.2 m (47 ft)
- No. of spans: 18
- Piers in water: 18

History
- Designer: Ernest Godfrey
- Constructed by: Main Roads Department
- Construction start: January 1935
- Construction cost: £9000
- Opened: 30 August 1935

Statistics

Western Australia Heritage Register
- Official name: Clackline Bridge
- Type: State Registered Place
- Designated: 18 November 2008
- Reference no.: 10910

Clackline Bridge is a road bridge in Clackline, Western Australia, 77 kilometres (48 mi) east of Perth in the Shire of Northam, that carried the Great Eastern Highway until 2008. It is the only bridge in Western Australia to have spanned both a waterway and railway, the Clackline Brook and the former Eastern Railway alignment. The mainly timber bridge has a unique curved and sloped design, due to the difficult topography and the route of the former railway. The bridge was designed in 1934 to replace two dangerous rail crossings and a rudimentary water crossing. Construction began in January 1935, and was completed relatively quickly, with the opening ceremony held in August 1935. The bridge has undergone various improvement and maintenance works since then, including widening by three metres (10 ft) in 1959–60, but remained a safety hazard, with increasing severity and numbers of accidents through the 1970s and 1980s. Planning for a highway bypass of Clackline and the Clackline Bridge began in the 1990s, and it was constructed between January 2007 and February 2008. The local community had been concerned that the historic bridge would be lost, but it remains in use as part of the local road network, and has been listed on both the Northam Municipal Heritage Inventory and the Heritage Council of Western Australia's Register of Heritage Places.

== Description ==
Clackline Bridge is a timber bridge spanning the Clackline Brook and the former Eastern Railway alignment, in the Shire of Northam, 77 kilometres (48 mi) east of Perth. Constrained by the topography of the site, the route of the Eastern Railway tracks, and the previous alignment of Great Eastern Highway, the bridge has a unique curved and sloping design. It has 18 spans over a 126-metre (413 ft) length, with a 1 in 20 slope and a horizontal curve radius of 400 metres (1,300 ft). There are 18 numbered piers, starting from pier 1 at the eastern end. The double tracks of the Eastern Railway, which linked Perth and Northam until its removal in 1981, passed between piers 16 and 17. Piers 14 to 17 are parallel to that former railway, at an angle of approximately 40 degrees to the bridge. This resulted in spans of various lengths: 7.6 metres (25 ft) heading out from the western abutment, then a 14-metre (46 ft) span between piers 16 and 17, followed by a 4.8-metre (16 ft) length, two 5.2-metre-long (17 ft) spans, and 13 spans of 6 metres (20 ft).

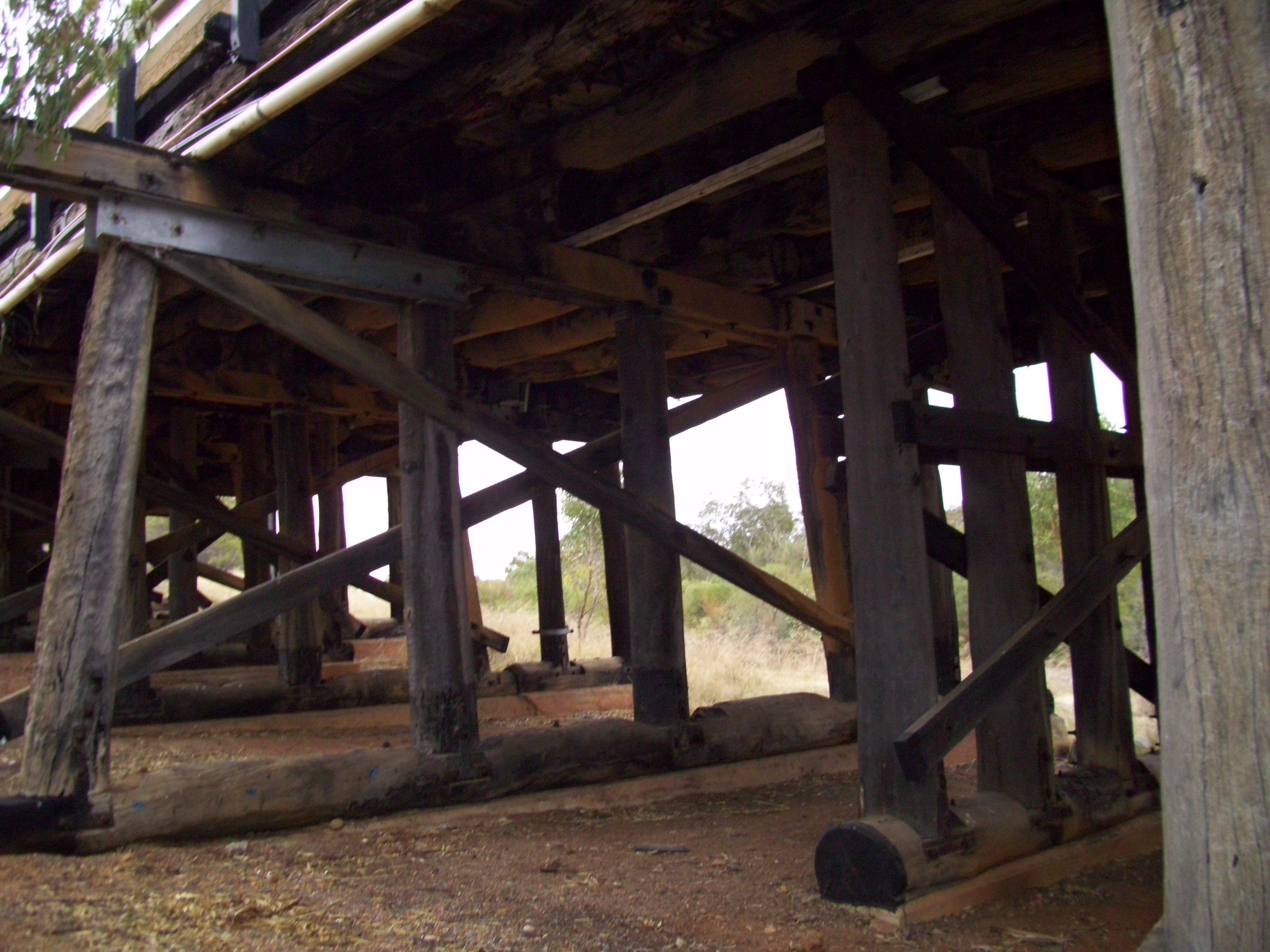
View of Clackline Bridge from below, showing the structure of the bridge and piers

The bridge has undergone multiple alterations, but the original piers remain. They were constructed as "four rounded braced wandoo piles supported from horizontal 450mm timber sills, adzed to 400mm, fixed to concrete footings", with the footings designed to bear on foundation rocks one and a half metres (4 ft 11 in) beneath the surface. The bridge's original spans were made up of seven rounded timber wandoo stringers, (Note: A stringer is a "long horizontal beam, supported over each pier or abutment, in turn supporting the decking structure of the bridge".) of at least 400 millimetres (16 in) diameter, bearing on jarrah corbels, (Note: A corbel is a "short supporting member, usually of similar section to the stringers – fixed longitudinally over piers (and sometimes abutments) and used to distribute loads over a pier".) supported by jarrah half caps (Note: Capping members distribute structural loads to a load-bearing column, known as a pile. Half caps "enabled maintenance of one of the capbeams to be undertaken while the load was still being taken by [an] adjacent halfcap".) 600 by 150 millimetres (23.6 by 5.9 in) in size. The 14-metre-long (46 ft) span over the railway alignment was originally supported on four 610-by-190-millimetre (24.0 by 7.5 in) steel beams, weighing 41 kilograms (90 lb) each.

Various aspects of Clackline Bridge have since been modified. Originally five and a half metres (18 ft) wide, with a 1.1-metre-wide (3.5 ft) footpath, the bridge was widened by three metres (9.8 ft), with two additional piles installed at each pier. At the same time the railway span was strengthened, with eight additional steel beams installed, and steel plates welded to the flanges of the existing girders. The approaches to the bridge were also widened, over a length of 150 metres (490 ft) to the west, and 60 metres (200 ft) to the east. The timber decking was upgraded to a concrete slab that has been repaired a number of times, especially around pier 13. Some of the connecting bolts in the structure have been replaced, and a concrete approach slab was installed at the western end. In 2008, the bridge was assessed as being in a well-maintained condition.

Main Roads Western Australia identifies Clackline Bridge as Structure Number 0608. As of 2014, the bridge dimensions are recorded as 133.6 metres (438 ft) in length and 8.98 metres (29.5 ft) in width, with a distance of 8.75 metres (28.7 ft) between kerbs, a deck area of 119.73 square metres (1,288.8 sq ft), and maximum span length of 14.2 metres (47 ft). As of 2008, it is the only bridge in Western Australia to have crossed both a railway line and a waterway.

== History ==
The settlement of Clackline began as a stopping point on the Spencers Brook to Northam section of the Eastern Railway line, which opened on 13 October 1886. It was also the point where the road to Newcastle (now Toodyay) (Note: Modern day Clackline–Toodyay Road) departed the Perth to Kalgoorlie road. Both the road and railway crossed the adjacent Clackline Brook. In 1926, the newly formed Main Roads Department's Engineer for Roads and Bridges, A. Fotheringham, described the majority of the Wooroloo to Clackline road as "simply a bush track widened out from time to time by the traffic". The road crossed the railway line twice, and Clackline Brook via a small bedlog bridge, in the vicinity of the town, but the rail crossings were "awkwardly and dangerously situated in regard to road traffic, owing to limited visibility", and the water crossing was described in 1935 as "a primitive and inadequate culvert".

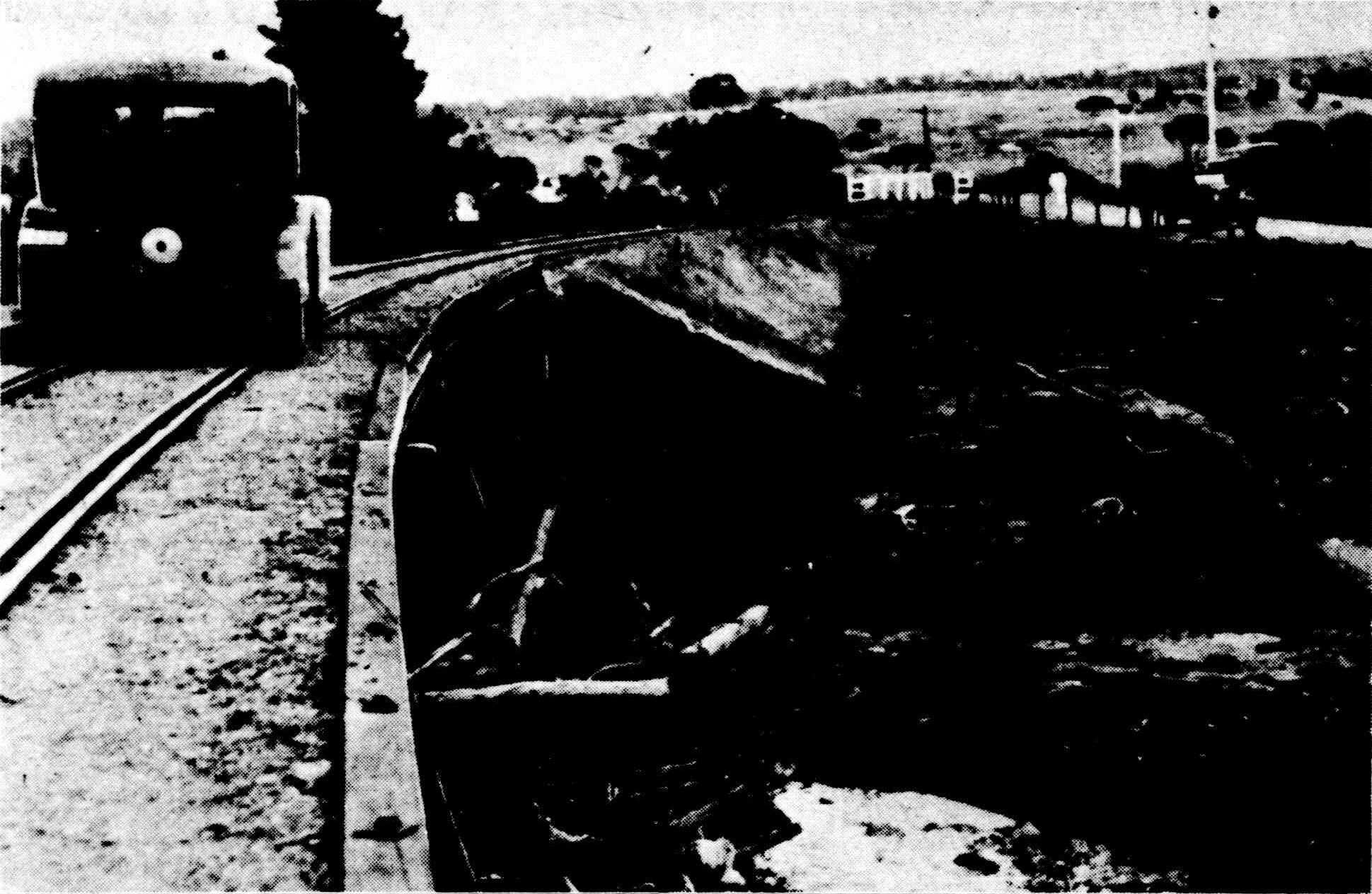
A car crosses the railway bridge to avoid the flooded road

Though the need to improve this section of road was recognised in 1926, funding was limited. Only part of the required improvement work was undertaken, and included rerouting the highway along Lockyer Road, resuming several town lots, and resurfacing the road, at a cost of £8000. In March 1934, torrential rain caused widespread flooding in the Wheatbelt, affecting Northam, Toodyay, York, Beverley, and surrounding areas. Rail services were disrupted, and main roads were cut off at many points, including at Clackline. Some cars managed to bypass the flooded road by driving along the railway line, but such practice was described by the Royal Automobile Club as "highly dangerous" and "against the railway regulations". The Main Roads Department had been considering completing the remaining improvements in November 1933, but the flooding made the situation more urgent. It prompted Bert Hawke, MLA for Northam, to write to the Commissioner for Main Roads, E. W. Tindale, urging that the Clackline works commence, especially since works at nearby Northam had almost been finished.

=== Design and construction ===
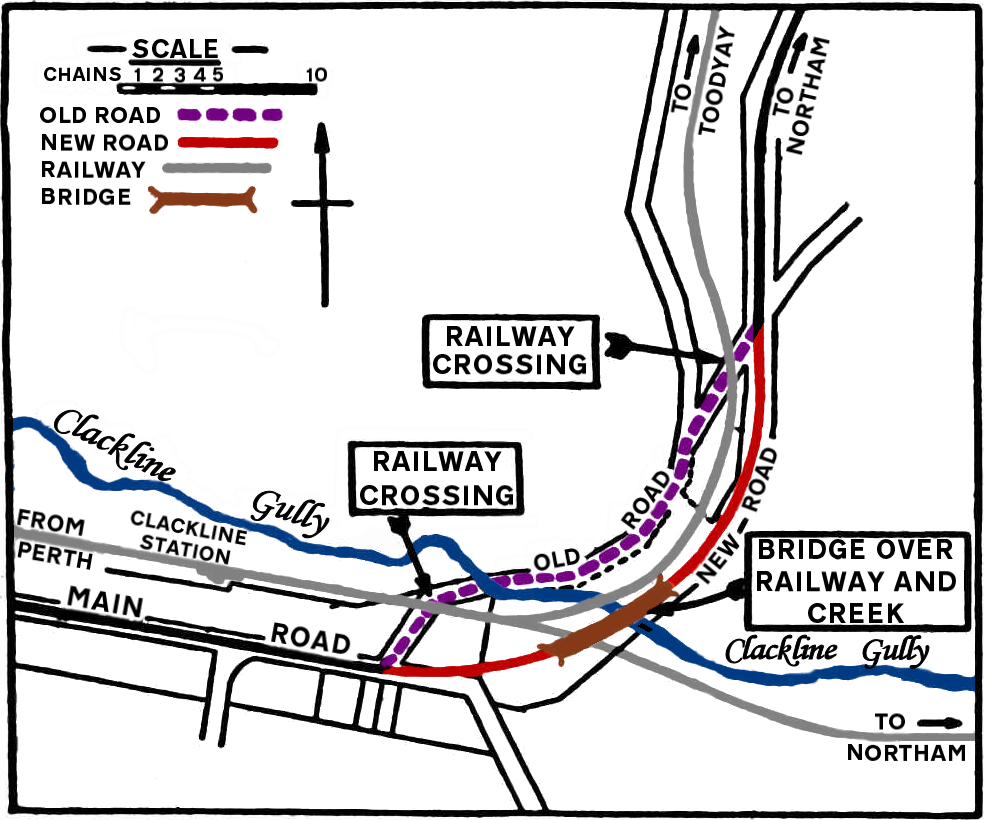
Clackline Bridge allowed the main road to avoid two railway crossings and dangerous curves, as shown in this map from 1935.

Main Roads engineer Ernest Godfrey completed a design for the Clackline Deviation, a single bridge over the waterway and railway, in August 1934. Godfrey was the first bridge engineer for Main Roads, and is credited with introducing concrete and steel bridges into Western Australia; however, for Clackline Bridge, he proposed using timber – the standard material for the preceding hundred years – with steel construction only for the longer span over the railway. He also suggested that a footpath be included on the bridge, so that schoolchildren and other pedestrians would have a safer railway crossing. The cost was estimated at £8500, plus an additional £700 for the footpath. The initial design was moved 10 feet (3.0 m) south, to satisfy the Railways Department's requirement that the route not be too close to the Toodyay railway line (a spur line off the Eastern Railway) that ran parallel to the highway. This shift increased the curve radius, but required "the destruction of some well developed pine trees inside the old boundary fence of the [Clackline School] playground".

Construction was undertaken by Main Roads Department day labourers, starting in January 1935, as part of an unemployment relief works program. The Western Australian Government Railways (WAGR) was involved in various aspects of the project – some railway land acquisition was required, and WAGR supplied and supervised a five-ton crane, used to erect the railway span girders. The bridge was completed less than one year after construction began, which would later be described as "a considerable achievement of the management and workforce for such a complex structure". Clackline Bridge was opened on 30 August 1935 by Acting Minister for Works H. Millington, having cost £9000. The first vehicle to cross the bridge was Millington's car, carrying himself and Bert Hawke on the front bumper, and a small boy who decided to take a ride on the rear bumper. Afterwards, there was an official lunchtime party in Northam, hosted by the Northam Roads Board.

=== Safety concerns and upgrades ===
Within two decades the bridge was considered a safety hazard, due to increased traffic volume, speed, and truck sizes. The primary concerns were deficiency in the width and curve radius. The bridge was strengthened as well as widened in 1959–60. Removing the footpath and using that space for the road had been suggested, but instead the structure itself was widened by ten feet (3.0 m), leaving the footpath intact. The approaches to the bridges were widened, new piers were erected either side of the railway span, and eight new girders were installed – six of which were part of the previous Causeway structure. The work was undertaken from a suspended platform, which had to be quickly pulled up when trains went past. The widening, designed by Main Road's second bridge engineer Gilbert Marsh, cost approximately £20,000.

Clackline Bridge continued to be a safety concern, with several accidents occurring in the 1970s. The narrow road and small curve radius were considered major factors in the accidents, and there was roughness in the road surface between the original and widened sections. A reinforced concrete overlay was installed on the bridge in 1978, initially with a single coat surface, but then upgraded to a 40-millimetre-thick (1.6 in) bituminous concrete surface in 1987. The 1980s saw the closure and removal of the Perth–Northam railway line, as well a number of major and sometimes fatal accidents involving prime movers. There were also several car accidents, and the "screaming brakes of cars and hiss of airbrakes" were often heard at night in Clackline. After each accident, damaged sections of the bridge – usually the guardrails, handrails, or bridge entry section – needed to be repaired. A 1989 prime mover accident severely damaged the footpath. Rather than repair the narrow footpath, and given that the railway had been removed, a new pedestrian path was constructed on the ground below the bridge.

A bushfire burnt through the area in December 1993, destroying the former railway's bridge over Clackline Brook. Clackline Bridge survived, weakened but in a reasonable condition. The damage included internal expansion joints that had failed, split bedlogs, and other deteriorated timbers. Steel props were installed to support the bridge, and the substructure was repaired in 1995, which mainly involved replacing connecting bolts. A concrete approach slab was installed adjacent to the western abutment in 1998, and in 2013 the concrete deck near pier 13 was repaired. Clackline Bridge was the crossing point for Great Eastern Highway until the highway's bypass of Clackline opened in February 2008. The bridge remains open to traffic, as part of the local road network. In July 2012 it once more carried highway traffic, excluding heavy vehicles, when an accident temporarily closed Great Eastern Highway at Spencers Brook Road.

== Replacement ==
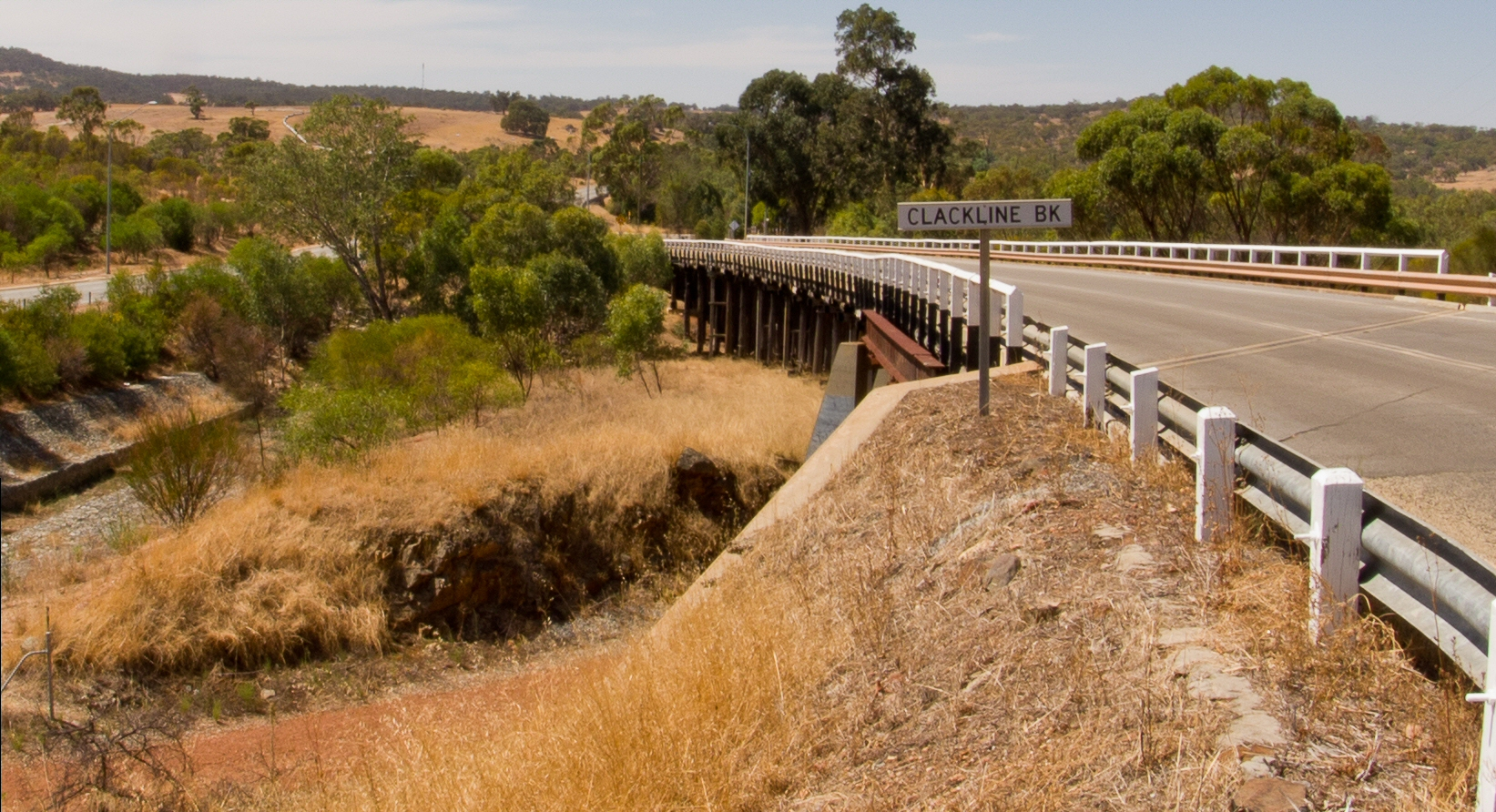
Clackline Bridge, with the Great Eastern Highway bypass on the left

In the wake of the accidents of the 1970s and 1980s, replacement of Clackline Bridge seemed inevitable; however, both Main Roads and the Shire of Northam received letters from residents asking for the bridge to be kept. In 1988, the Shire requested that Main Roads note the preservation value of the bridge, and retain it in any plans for road realignment. A decade later, in 1998, the bridge was placed on the Northam Municipal Heritage Inventory, in category C – "conserve if possible". In that same year, it was included in an Institute of Engineers survey of the state's large timber structures, as a current structure with "very high heritage value". By this time Great Eastern Highway's bypass of Clackline was being planned, but maintenance works continued to be undertaken as needed. The bypass was eventually constructed, with works beginning in January 2007, and the project completed in February 2008. The Clackline community welcomed the bypass, but there were still concerns that the historic Clackline Bridge would be lost. The bridge has since received a permanent entry on the Heritage Council of Western Australia's Register of Heritage Places, in November 2008. The new highway alignment crosses Clackline Brook on a large box culvert, giving vehicles a safer crossing than Clackline Bridge.
