= Avro Anson Memorial =

Australian military memorial

- Interactive map of Avro Anson Memorial
- Location: Avro Anson Road near Clackline, Western Australia
- Coordinates: 31.7519°S 116.5611°E
- Type: Cairn
- Length: 2.5 m (8 ft 2 in)
- Width: 2.5 m (8 ft 2 in)
- Height: 1.5 m (4 ft 11 in)
- Completion date: 12 December 1942
- Dedicated to: F/O Lynton Birt; Sgt Geoffrey Debenham; Sgt Noel Nixon; Sgt Kenneth Hugo

The Avro Anson Memorial, also known as the RAAF Anson Aircraft Memorial, Air Disaster Memorial, or Mokine Memorial, commemorates four Royal Australian Air Force (RAAF) airmen killed when their Avro Anson aircraft crashed near Clackline, Western Australia on 9 October 1942. The memorial, assembled by members of the local community in the months following the crash, features a cairn of granite and boulders supporting a jarrah cross. The names and details of the deceased airmen − Flying Officer Lynton Birt, Sergeant Geoffrey Debenham, Sergeant Noel Nixon, and Sergeant Kenneth Hugo − are carved into the cross. Birt was interred in the Northam Cemetery, and later reinterred in the Perth war cemetery and annex (N.A.8) while the others were buried at Karrakatta Cemetery.

Over the years, the memorial was forgotten and lost, overgrown by shrubs and trees. Upon its rediscovery in the early 1980s, the memorial's history and significance were researched, and it was restored in 1984 by volunteers from the Perth branch of the Royal Australian Air Force Association. Since then, the association has held annual memorial services at the site. In 2013, the Northam RSL spent $14,700 on safety and accessibility works, funded by Lotterywest and the Northam RSL.

== Background ==
On 9 October 1942, an Avro Anson aircraft (No. W2262), piloted by Sergeant Geoffrey Debenham and carrying Flying Officer Lynton Birt, Sergeant Noel Nixon, (Note: Newspaper reports of that era use the name "Nixon", while later sources use the name "Dixon".) and Sergeant Kenneth Hugo, crashed near Clackline, Western Australia. The airmen, all from 68 Reserve Squadron based at Geraldton, were on a training mission, flying from Cunderdin to Pearce air force base. Partway along what should have been a routine flight, the aircraft crashed and burned, leaving no survivors, and destroying the aircraft.

=== Crew ===
Kenneth Colin (Les) Hugo was born in Perth, and attended school at Armadale. He went on to study at Perth Technical College, and then worked in the Vacuum Oil Company's Perth office. According to his father, he was a "lover of sport", enjoying cricket, football, swimming and yachting. Hugo enlisted in the air force in 1941, where he was a wireless operator air-gunner. He was 21 at the time of the crash.

Lynton Vennel Howard Birt originated from Subiaco, Western Australia. He attended Hale School from 1931 to 1933, where he played cricket and football, and was "above average" academically. Following his schooling, he worked for the English, Scottish and Australian Bank, and continued to play sports, as a wing for the Old Haleians hockey club. At the outbreak of World War II, Birt enlisted in the RAAF, where he eventually became a navigator. He was 25 at the time of the crash.

Noel Louis Nixon was the son of Mr. L. W. Nixon of Bundaberg, Queensland. Geoffrey Lancaster Debenham was the son of Mr. P. Debenham of Kempsey, New South Wales. Nixon was 28 and Debenham was 25 years old at the time of the crash.

=== Crash ===
The Avro Anson crashed soon after 1:00 pm, on private property leased by Mr George Edward Harvey, west of Mokine. Mrs Irene May Harvey (née Marston) saw the aircraft coming in close to the ground, looking like it was going to hit her house. It passed over the building, and beyond nearby trees, before crashing approximately three-quarters of a mile (1.2 km) from the homestead. There was a large explosion and rising columns of smoke from that point. Mrs Harvey hurried over to the crash site, but was unable to give any assistance as the wreckage was burning fiercely and machine gun ammunition was continually cooking off. The crash was loud enough to be heard across several miles, and attracted close to fifty people within half an hour. The aircraft had crashed approximately 100 yards (91 m) past a tree into rising ground, in which it gouged 20-yard-long (18 m) trenches and two large holes, exposing boulders from below the surface. The wreckage ended up in front of a large tree close to a rock outcrop, the crew had been flung out of the cabin, and the rudder was found 20 yards (18 m) away in the branches of another tree.

=== Aftermath ===
Within an hour, the Avro Anson was reduced to a smouldering pile of material and metal. An RAAF ambulance transported the crew's bodies to the Northam morgue; two days later the Air Force Inquiry Board inspected the scene, and their salvage unit removed the wreckage.

Birt's remains were interred in the Northam Cemetery's Anglican section on 11 October 1942, while Hugo's remains were interred at Perth's Karrakatta Cemetery. Debenham and Nixon were buried at Karrakatta Cemetery on 14 October 1942, following a service at St George's Cathedral at 9.30 am, conducted by the Dean of Perth, R. H. Moore.

== Memorial ==
=== Description ===
The memorial site is located on the low side of Avro Anson Road, in a small park approximately five kilometres (3.1 mi) south-east of Clackline. The memorial is constructed of granite and boulders gathered nearby and formed into a cairn measuring approximately 2.5 by 2.5 metres (8 ft 2 in by 8 ft 2 in) at the base, 1.5 metres (4 ft 11 in) high and 1.5 by 1.5 metres (4 ft 11 in by 4 ft 11 in) at the top. It is surmounted by a wooden cross approximately 1.4 metres (4 ft 7 in) high. The cross is of West Australian jarrah and was made by an Australian Army Works Unit in nearby Spencers Brook. The names of the four deceased airmen and other details are carved into the cross.

=== Installation ===
The memorial was assembled by members of the local community in the months following the crash. It was dedicated and consecrated on 12 December 1942, at a ceremony conducted by Senior Chaplain Lieut.-Colonel Elvey. Afterwards, wreaths were laid by relatives, members of the armed forces, and children from the nearby Clackline School, while the RAAF and Volunteer Defence Corps provided a guard of honour.

=== Restoration ===
Over the years, the memorial was forgotten and lost, overgrown by shrubs and trees. A Shire of Northam survey team came across the memorial in the early 1980s; subsequently, the Perth branch of the Royal Australian Air Force Association (RAAFA) assisted with researching the site's history and significance. The ravages of time and the effects of an earthquake at Meckering had taken their toll, and in early 1984, a small band of volunteers (all of World War II vintage) set about the task of restoration. This work involved the rebuilding in part of the stone cairn, refurbishing and painting of the cross, the erection of a low steel post and chain fence around the memorial and the provision of a bronze plaque. The wording on the plaque reads:

This monument was erected by members of the Bakers Hill/Clackline Volunteer Defence Corps and other local citizens and dedicated on 13th December 1942, to mark the site where RAAF Anson Aircraft No W2262 crashed on 9th October 1942, killing all four crew members. The City of Perth Branch of the Royal Australian Air Force Association carried out restoration of the monument, and it was rededicated on 25th November 1984 by Bishop Denis Bryant, DFC 'PER ARDUA AD ASTRA'

=== Legacy ===
The RAAFA WA Division has held annual memorial services at the site since October 1985, on the nearest weekend to the anniversary of the accident. The Northam RSL membership keep the site clear of rubbish and inspect the memorial for damage on a yearly basis. In 2013 a meeting between RAAFA officers and Northam RSL Secretary Reg Stevens, formalised an agreement whereby control of the site was passed from the RAAFA to the Northam RSL.

In 2013, under the supervision of Project Manager and Secretary Reg Stevens, the Northam sub branch of the RSL spent $14,700 on the site, funded by a $13,700 grant from Lotterywest and a $1000 contribution from the Northam RSL. The grant was administered by the Shire of Northam as land owners. The renovation works, designed to improve visitor safety and accessibility, included a concrete path and handrail, which were used and appreciated on the day of the 2013 memorial service.
