= Wundowie charcoal iron and wood distillation plant =

Charcoal iron and wood distillation plant at Wundowie, Western Australia

Coordinates: 31°45′55.5″S 116°23′05.0″E

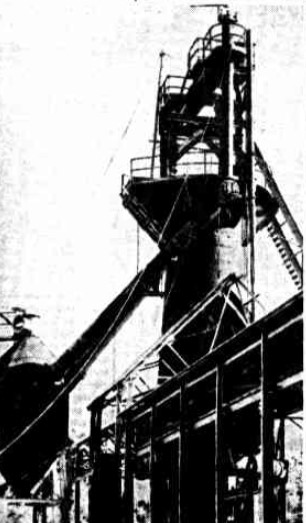
Wundowie charcoal iron blast furnace in 1952

The Wundowie charcoal iron and wood distillation plant manufactured pig iron between 1948 and 1981 and wood distillation products between 1950 and 1977, at Wundowie, Western Australia.

Originally a state-owned enterprise, it seems not to have been incorporated as a company, during the time it was known as the Charcoal Iron and Steel Industry.

At its greatest extent, the plant comprised two blast furnaces, a metal foundry, a sawmill, retorts for charcoal production, a power plant, and a refinery for wood distillation products. The planned garden town of Wundowie, approximately 65 kilometres (40 mi) east of Perth by road and 30 kilometres (19 mi) west of Northam, was built to provide accommodation for the workers of the plant.

From 1966, the plant was privately managed by Australian National Industries, and its workers became employees of that company. The plant was sold by the government in 1974 to Agnew-Clough Ltd.

Production of iron ceased in 1981. The foundry continued in operation, under several different owners, and was still operating in 2019.

The blast furnaces at Wundowie were not the last ones to make charcoal iron in commercial quantities; as of 2013 there were still charcoal-based iron and steel-making operations in Brazil.

== Historical context ==
A deposit of limonite iron ore existed at the future site of Wundowie, as nearby did extensive jarrah forests. There were other iron ore deposits nearby, at Coates Siding and Clackline. The future site of Wundowie lay along the route of the Eastern Railway, providing transport to and from Perth and access to further iron ore deposits to the east at Koolyanobbing. Limestone – for use as a smelting flux – could be obtained from the Perth coastal plain.

Until 1966, it was conventional wisdom that iron ore was scarce in Australia and—as a strategic mineral reserved for local manufacturing—its export was banned in 1938. That left the only way to exploit local iron ore being the secondary processing of the ore to make iron. By 1943, an iron and steel industry was well established in New South Wales—at Newcastle (from 1915) and Port Kembla (relocated from Lithgow in 1928)—and in South Australia—at Whyalla (from 1941).

Although Western Australia had significant deposits of iron ore, the absence of coking coal disadvantaged the state as a location for an iron and steel industry. The south-west of the state did have extensive forests of jarrah, which made excellent charcoal that—provided it could be produced economically—could be used in a blast furnace instead of coke. At the time, such forests were considered a managed natural resource, and ripe for exploitation.

Immediately before and during the Great Depression, Australia—then largely an exporter of agricultural and mineral commodities—suffered as commodity prices fell. Unemployment peaked at 27% in 1932. During World War II, under wartime industry controls, unemployment in Australia reached a new low of 1.1%. During the war, new manufacturing facilities were established and employment in the sector accounted for much of the reduction in unemployment; the government saw growth in manufacturing as providing reliable employment, which would reduce the chance of another depression. Manufacturing in Australia was protected from import competition by a regime of tariffs.

At the end of World War II, the Commonwealth government and all state governments, except South Australia, were held by Australian Labor Party. The ALP has a key part of its platform known as the socialist objective. In more recent times, the socialist objective has largely been ignored but, in the 1940s, the ALP's policy was to centralise control of the economy, including plans to nationalise the banks. A significant number of large enterprises in the Australian economy were already state-owned enterprises, and the government thinking of the time was that was a desirable outcome.

Western Australia lies far from the more-industrialised, eastern parts of Australia. During and immediately after World War II, it had a Labor government. The government's view was that its involvement would be needed to facilitate the industrial development of the state. It also saw an iron and steel industry using local iron ore as being key to further industrialisation of the sparsely populated state.

Bert Hawke was the Minister of Industrial Development. He was also a member for the electorate of Northam, which contained the future location of Wundowrie.

== History of operations ==
=== Foundation and construction ===
Although the government had been investigating local production of iron using charcoal for some years, the story of the plant at Wundowrie begins with the passing of the Wood Distillation and Charcoal Iron and Steel Industry Act 1943. This authorised the state government to set up and operate a plant to carry out wood distillation and the production of Charcoal Iron and of Steel and to set up a Charcoal Iron and Steel Industry Board of Management. The champion of this legislation was Bert Hawke.

The plant was to produce 10,000 tons of pig iron, 480 tons of acetic acid, and 112,000 gallons of wood naphtha each year. The chemicals were to be a by-product of the production—via destructive distillation of wood, in externally-heated closed retorts—of charcoal to be used in a blast furnace for making iron. The production of these chemicals was intended to enhance the commercial viability of the iron-making operation. The wood would come from the jarrah forests in the area, and any wood suitable for use as timber would be processed as sawn timber, to further enhance the commercial viability; wood for the retorts would mainly consist of offcuts and waste wood from the sawmilling operations.

Work at the site was underway by November 1944. In March 1945, the foundations for the blast furnace had been constructed but work on the furnace itself was held up by lack of steel, and work on the retorts had commenced.

The Department of Housing developed the model township of Wundowie, based on garden town principles, to house the workers at the plant.

In 1947, there was a change of government in Western Australia, and the incoming government—while still supporting in principle an iron and steel industry for south-west WA—held an enquiry into the Wundowie development, and placed a hold on building housing and business premises in the new town. However, construction of the plant itself was, by then, well advanced and the enquiry findings were in favour of the project. It was completed in late 1947.

=== Initial operation ===
On 22 January 1948, the Wundowie blast furnace produced its first iron. The smelting works were officially opened on 15 April 1948, by the new Premier of Western Australia, Ross McLarty. The wood distillation products refinery did not commence operating until January 1950.

It was expected that the entire output of 10,000 tons of iron per annum would be taken by the local foundries and the Chamberlain tractor project at Welshpool.

Difficulties experienced by the State Electricity Commission meant that the plant had to commence operating without its connection to the main grid. There were power shortages, until the grid connection became operational in October 1950. The plant used two forms of on-site power generation: steam and diesel. Two Babcock & Wilcox boilers were installed, capable of using four different kinds of fuel: blast furnace gas, wood, sawdust and tar. These different materials could be used separately or together. The steam generated by the boilers operated a 250 kW turbogenerator. Once the state grid supplied power, this generator continued to supply power to all the continuous processes on the site, such as the retorts, the blast furnace and the townsite. The supply grid powered the sawmills and the ore crushing equipment. Two diesel generators were available on stand-by.

=== Enhancement and expansion ===
The ore deposit at Wundowie was less extensive and more variable than initially thought and, from 1950, ore to mix with it was sourced from Koolyanobbing. By April 1951, the Board had decided to use Koolyanobbing ore exclusively; plant to process the ore was built at Koolyanobbing, from where it was sent by truck to Southern Cross where it was loaded onto trains. The Koolyanobbing ore had a significantly higher iron content.

Iron pigs were originally cast in sand moulds. The consistency of the pig's size, weight, and silica content was improved when a pig-casting machine was put into operation in 1952.

Iron from the plant was used in the production of Chamberlain tractors. By 1955, the plant was having trouble fulfilling its orders.

During the period from the 1953 election to the 1959 election, Bert Hawke—member for Northam, who had been a force behind the establishment of the plant—was the Premier of Western Australia, something that was a favourable circumstance for the expansion of the plant at Wundowie. During 1955, the board discussed expanding the plant with the premier, and cabinet approved the expansion of the industry in May 1956; £300,000 was allocated for the expansion, which consisted of two new retorts, a second blast furnace, and associated equipment.

The second blast furnace entered service in early 1958 and the additional retorts were put into full operation in 1959. The production level for 1958/59 was 24,330 tons. In the following year, production rose to 47,534 tons.

=== Difficulties and change to private management ===
The refinery for the wood distillation products proved to be less viable than the iron smelting operations. There was a lack of demand for its products in Western Australia, and the cost of transporting its products to other places affected its viability. Closing the refinery was investigated in 1958, but it was found to be marginally profitable and was kept in operation.

Production reached a record 52,262 tons of iron in 1960/61 but afterwards began to decline, due to static iron prices and escalating production costs. The plant lost £13,809 in 1963/64, not including loan costs. A study was carried out on future alternatives for the plant under full private ownership. One alternative identified was to operate a foundry at the site to make cast products, adding value to pig iron produced there. For this, more capital would be needed.

The realignment of the Eastern Railway, opened in 1966, caused another difficulty for the Wundowie works, which were located on the old narrow-gauge line some distance from the new line. A new standard gauge line for Koolyanobbing had been a condition the building of Australian Iron & Steel's blast furnace at Kwinana. A section of the old narrow-gauge line from Northam remained open to allow ore trains to reach Wundowie. The Western Australian Government Railways overcame the problem of transporting iron ore the 322 km from Koolyanobbing to Wundowie, over two gauges. Special purpose open-topped, end-loading containers were lifted off flat cars from one gauge to another. Following a related realignment of the Eastern Goldfields Railway, the new line allowed iron ore to be carried directly from Koolyanobbing to BHP's newly-opened blast furnace at Kwinana, on Cockburn Sound. The existence, in Western Australia, of another and much larger capacity iron-producing plant probably coloured the state government's view about the future of the small marginally-economic plant at Wundowie.

The Liberal government of Western Australia became unwilling to commit to capital investment in the Wundowie plant. In June 1966, the government reached agreement with Australian National Industries (ANI) to take over management of the iron plant, build a foundry, and assume responsibility for future capital needs. In return, the government would receive a 25% share of profits. ANI received a ten-year option to buy the plant. Workers at the plant became employees of ANI.

In 1973—the final year before it was sold by the government—the Wundowie plant produced pig iron to the value of A$3.1 million.

=== Sale, private ownership and end of iron production ===
The plant was sold by the government to Agnew-Clough Ltd in 1974, but that company did not take over the iron plant until June 1975. It became known as Wundowie Iron and Steel, a division of Agnew-Clough Ltd.

Agnew-Clough planned to set up a plant to process vanadium ore to produce vanadium pentoxide at the site, while continuing to operate the iron plant. The vanadium plant commenced operations in 1980.

The refinery had become uneconomic and closed in April 1977. In 1979, the saw mill was closed. Still reliant on supplies of wood for charcoal, the plant became increasingly less economically viable. Production of iron ceased in February 1981. All mining at Koolyanobbing ceased once the Australian Iron & Steel blast furnace at Kwinana also closed in 1982. For the first time since 1948, no iron was being made in Western Australia.

== After iron production ==
=== Other smelting operations and proposals ===
It had been expected that the vanadium plant would absorb some of the workforce from the iron plant, but that plant closed in March 1982, due to technical problems and a market downturn.

Around 1987, there was a proposal to smelt silicon metal at Wundowie. This did not eventuate and a new silicon smelter—using charcoal as a reducing agent—was set up at Wellesley, entering production in 1989–1990.

=== Wundowie Foundry ===
After iron production ceased, the foundry continued in operation. The Wundowie Stove, a pot-belly stove designed in the plant's design office, was produced in the foundry from 1982 until 2005. The foundry also made anvils from ductile iron.

Wundowie Foundry Pty Ltd was founded in 1985, and was privately owned. New furnaces were installed in 1991 for the production of steel castings. In 2004–05, a consortium of managers bought the foundry and reassured the community that the operation was secure.

The Wundowie Foundry was acquired by Bradken on 14 November 2006. With the subsequent acquisition of Bradken by Hitachi Construction Machinery, in 2017, the Bradken foundry is now a part of that group.

=== Wundowie ===
The garden township of Wundowie suffered from the fall in employment after iron production ceased and the vanadium plant closed. By 1985, many households in the town's public housing were occupied by welfare recipients, for many of whom the planned town was a beautiful place to live but one lacking in social services.

== Legacy and remnants ==
Wundowie in 1981 was one of the last places where charcoal iron was made in significant quantities in the developed world. Charcoal iron is still made in Brazil.

The blast furnaces at Wundowie were, when operating, the only iron-making plant in Australia not owned by BHP. Their small capacity and the lack of a steel-making operation meant that, in practice, Wundowie had little impact on BHP's monopoly in iron and steel.

The township of Wundowie and the remaining foundry operations there are the surviving legacy of the ironmaking operations. The administration building of the original plant is still used by the foundry and has a local government heritage listing. The extent of other remnants at the site of the old plant appears to be undocumented, but the distillation towers were still standing near the foundry in May 2010.

An annual event known as the Wundowie Iron Festival is named after the old plant.

== Publications ==
- 1965 Wundowie : charcoal-iron, basic iron, hematite-iron : the wood-distillation, charcoal-iron and steel industry of WA, Paterson, Brokensha, 1965
- 1966 Cowie, W. McD (1966), Charcoal Iron & Steel Industry, Wundowie, W. McD. Cowie
- 1969 Charcoal Iron and Steel (Firm) (1969), Wundowie charcoal iron, the Industry
