= Bakers Hill, Western Australia =

Bakers Hill
- Town
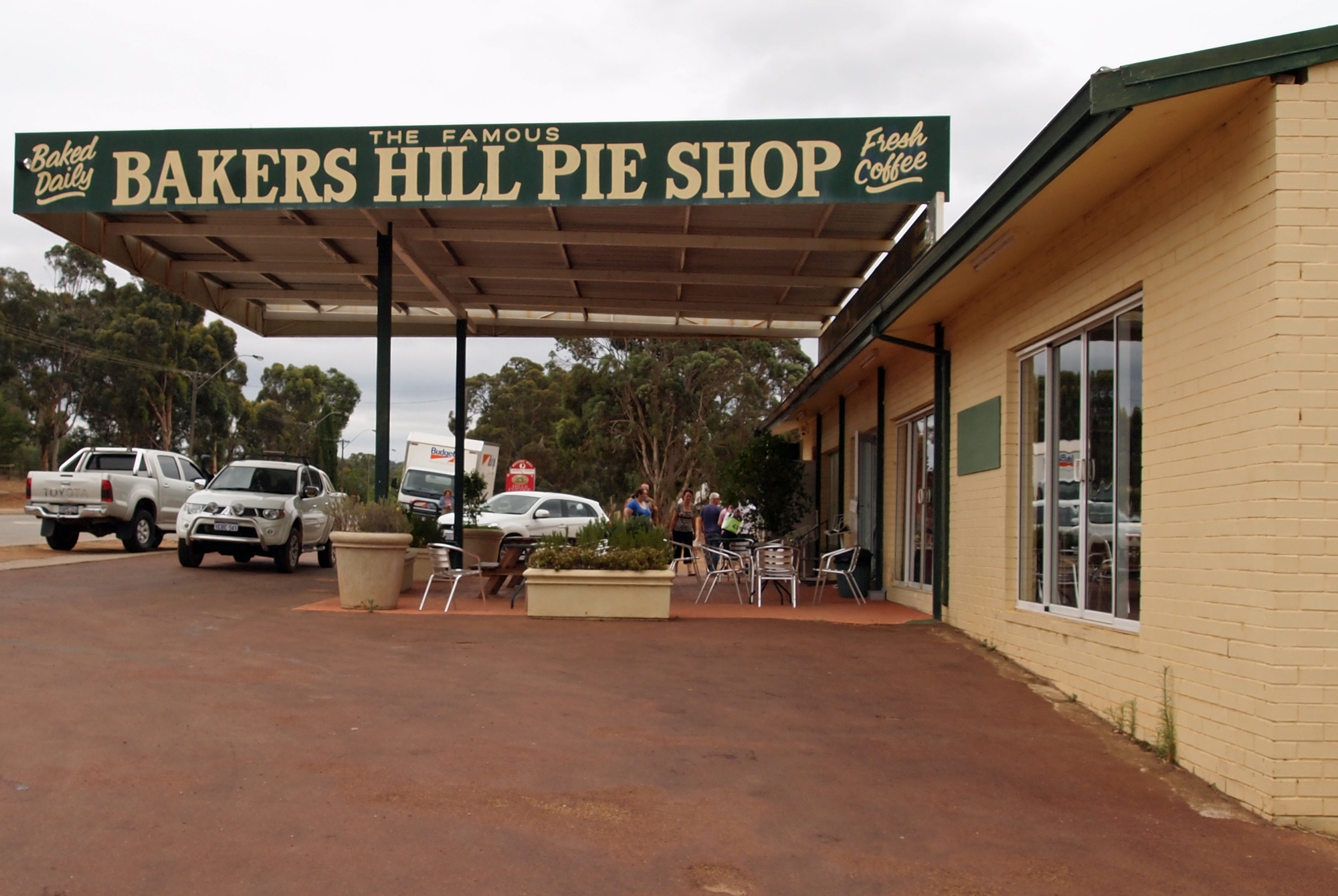
- Bakers Hill

- Interactive map of Bakers Hill
- Coordinates: 31.751°S 116.455°E
- Country: Australia
- State: Western Australia
- LGA: Shire of Northam
- Location: 73 km (45 mi) ENE of Perth; 24 km (15 mi) SW of Northam
- Established: 1897

Government
  - State electorate: Central Wheatbelt
  - Federal division: Bullwinkel

Area
  - Total: 83.9 km^{2} (32.4 sq mi)
- Elevation: 330 m (1,080 ft)

Population
  - Total: 792 (UCL 2021)
- Postcode: 6562
- Mean max temp: 23.0 °C (73.4 °F)
- Mean min temp: 10.8 °C (51.4 °F)
- Annual rainfall: 551.6 mm (21.72 in)

Bakers Hill is a town 73 kilometres (45 mi) east of Perth, Western Australia on the Great Eastern Highway. The town is located within the Shire of Northam, between Wundowie and Clackline. At the 2021 census, Bakers Hill had a population of 1276.

== History ==
The town was originally known as Mount Baker when it was established in 1897. In 1902, the name was changed to Baker's Hill to avoid confusion with the town of Mount Barker in the Great Southern area. The apostrophe was removed from the name in 1944.

== Military history ==
During World War II, Bakers Hill was the location of the 62nd Field Park Company of the Royal Australian Engineers (RAE).

== Railways ==
Bakers Hill was also a station and siding on the second route of the Eastern Railway between Midland Junction and Spencers Brook. This track was closed in 1966 when the route through the Avon Valley was opened.

Although the rail was removed in 1980, remnants of the old station platform are still visible.

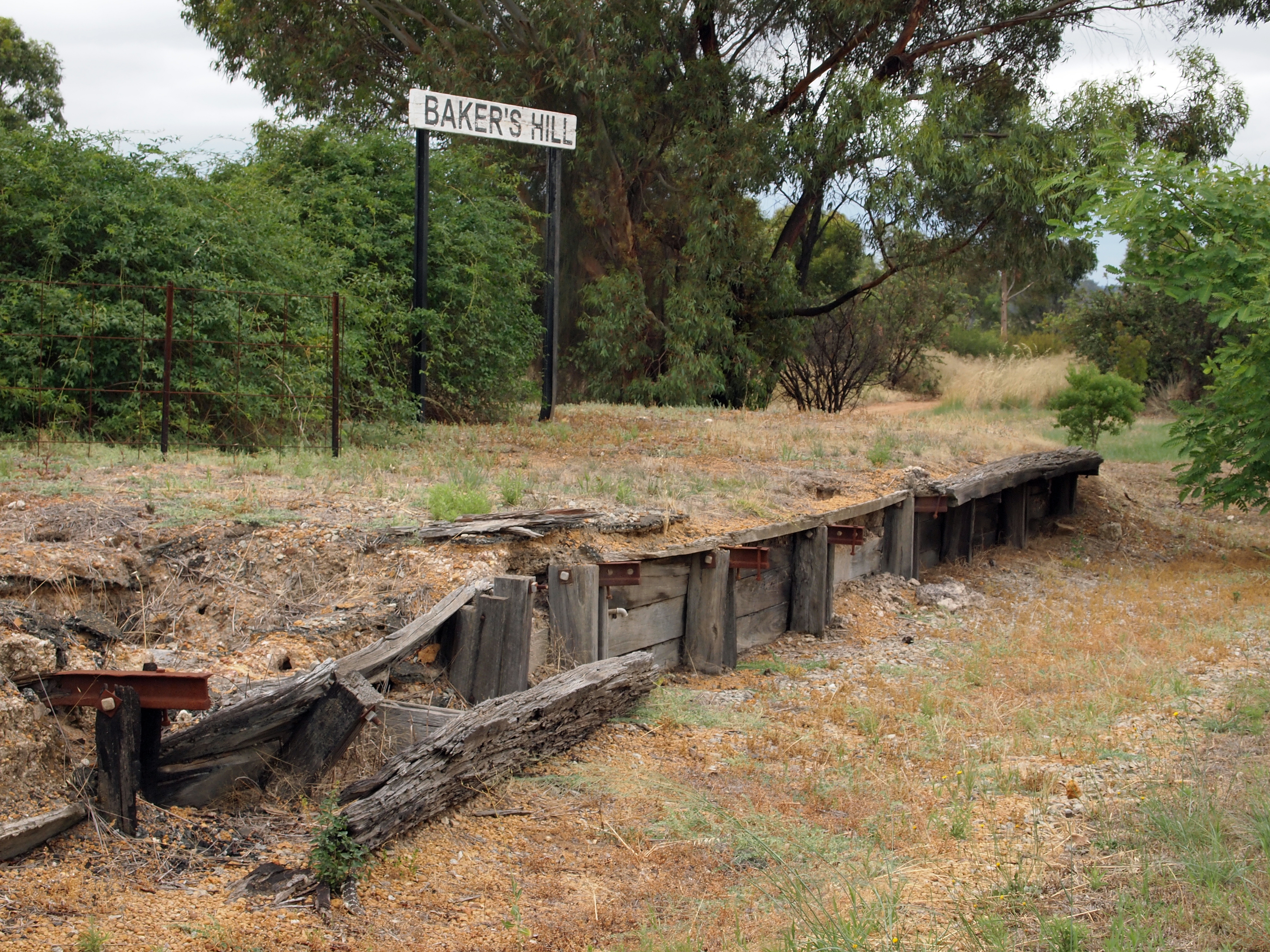
The remains of the station

== Climate ==
Bakers Hill has a Mediterranean climate with hot dry summers and cool, rather wet winters.

Climate data for Bakers Hill
Month	Jan	Feb	Mar	Apr	May	Jun	Jul	Aug	Sep	Oct	Nov	Dec	Year
Record high °C (°F)	43.2 (109.8)	44.6 (112.3)	40.0 (104.0)	37.8 (100.0)	33.3 (91.9)	24.2 (75.6)	23.3 (73.9)	27.0 (80.6)	31.7 (89.1)	36.6 (97.9)	39.8 (103.6)	42.0 (107.6)	44.6 (112.3)
Mean daily maximum °C (°F)	31.8 (89.2)	31.7 (89.1)	28.5 (83.3)	23.5 (74.3)	19.2 (66.6)	16.0 (60.8)	15.1 (59.2)	15.6 (60.1)	17.5 (63.5)	21.7 (71.1)	25.6 (78.1)	29.9 (85.8)	23.0 (73.4)
Mean daily minimum °C (°F)	15.7 (60.3)	16.1 (61.0)	14.6 (58.3)	12.3 (54.1)	9.4 (48.9)	7.6 (45.7)	6.6 (43.9)	6.4 (43.5)	7.0 (44.6)	8.9 (48.0)	11.2 (52.2)	14.0 (57.2)	10.8 (51.4)
Record low °C (°F)	7.8 (46.0)	7.2 (45.0)	6.2 (43.2)	4.0 (39.2)	2.4 (36.3)	0.2 (32.4)	0.6 (33.1)	−2.9 (26.8)	0.2 (32.4)	0.5 (32.9)	1.7 (35.1)	5.5 (41.9)	−2.9 (26.8)
Average precipitation mm (inches)	16.0 (0.63)	13.0 (0.51)	17.4 (0.69)	30.6 (1.20)	71.1 (2.80)	110.4 (4.35)	113.7 (4.48)	86.3 (3.40)	64.0 (2.52)	33.9 (1.33)	20.8 (0.82)	10.2 (0.40)	581.3 (22.89)
Average precipitation days	2.1	2.4	2.9	6.0	10.2	14.2	14.9	13.7	11.6	6.9	4.4	2.3	91.6
