= Clackline School =

Former primary school in Western Australia

Coordinates: 31°43′10″S 116°31′24″E

Clackline School, later known as Clackline Primary School, was a school in the Wheatbelt town of Clackline, Western Australia. It opened in 1896, and was extended and renovated several times before relocating in 1954 to a new site on the same road. The school was closed down in 1976, but in 1980 became the temporary location of the Avon Valley Church's school. A monument commemorating British colonisation was erected in 1929, and remains in use as a stopping point on the Kep Track.

== History ==
Clackline School first opened in 1896. On 17 January 1896, Hannah McCarthy was provisionally appointed as the school's mistress. In May 1899, A. P. Lyhane was announced as master of the school. In November 1899, the government allocated Clackline School £275 of expenditure, and on 30 November 1899 the Department of Public Works advertised for tenders for a "Clackline School and Quarters" contract. The department accepted Stewart and Co.'s tender of £302 19s 3d. In 1908, tenders for additions to the quarters were invited, and the lowest tenderer was D. McDonald. By 1912 the school and quarters required renovations. J. Meredith of Toodyay submitted the lowest tender of £52 17s 6d, which was accepted.

In 1915 the school's teachers and children, with the local progress association, organised a charity social event. Gifts sold to benefit the Western Australia Day Fund for the sick and wounded, with £22 1s 8d raised. The event was described as a "most successful affair", attracting participants from nearby and far away who patriotically fired off silver bullets.

Approximately 35 students attended Clackline School in 1920, which had gardens and wheat plots for the children to enjoy.

In April 1921 the Public Works Department accepted a tender of £182 15s 6d from A. Woolhouse for further additions to the school. In May of the following year, Edmondson Bros.'s tender of £68 for school quarters and verandahs was accepted. Tenders for renovations of Clackline school were called for in September 1927.

On 6 July 1932, the Northam branch of Toc H visited Clackline School. Despite unfavourable weather, they successfully held sports competitions throughout the day, with prizes awarded, followed by entertainment in the evening, attended by children and adults in the public hall.

On 12 December 1942, the Clackline School children participated in the dedication and consecration of the Avro Anson Memorial, which commemorates four Royal Australian Air Force airmen killed nearby earlier that year. The children laid wreaths, along with relatives and members of the armed forces.

In May 1950, the Minister for Education, Mr Watts, revealed to the Clackline Progress Association that a new school, with a septic tank, was planned for Clackline, with the work to begin as soon as possible. The new school, located a short distance away but still on Great Eastern Highway, opened c. 1954, the same year the old school closed. The name was also changed to Clackline Primary School. After 22 years, this newer school was shut down in 1976.

In 1980, the Avon Valley Church leased the Clackline school site, while awaiting funds to construct a school on land purchased in Northam. The school was the only one in the area north of Perth.

== Monument ==
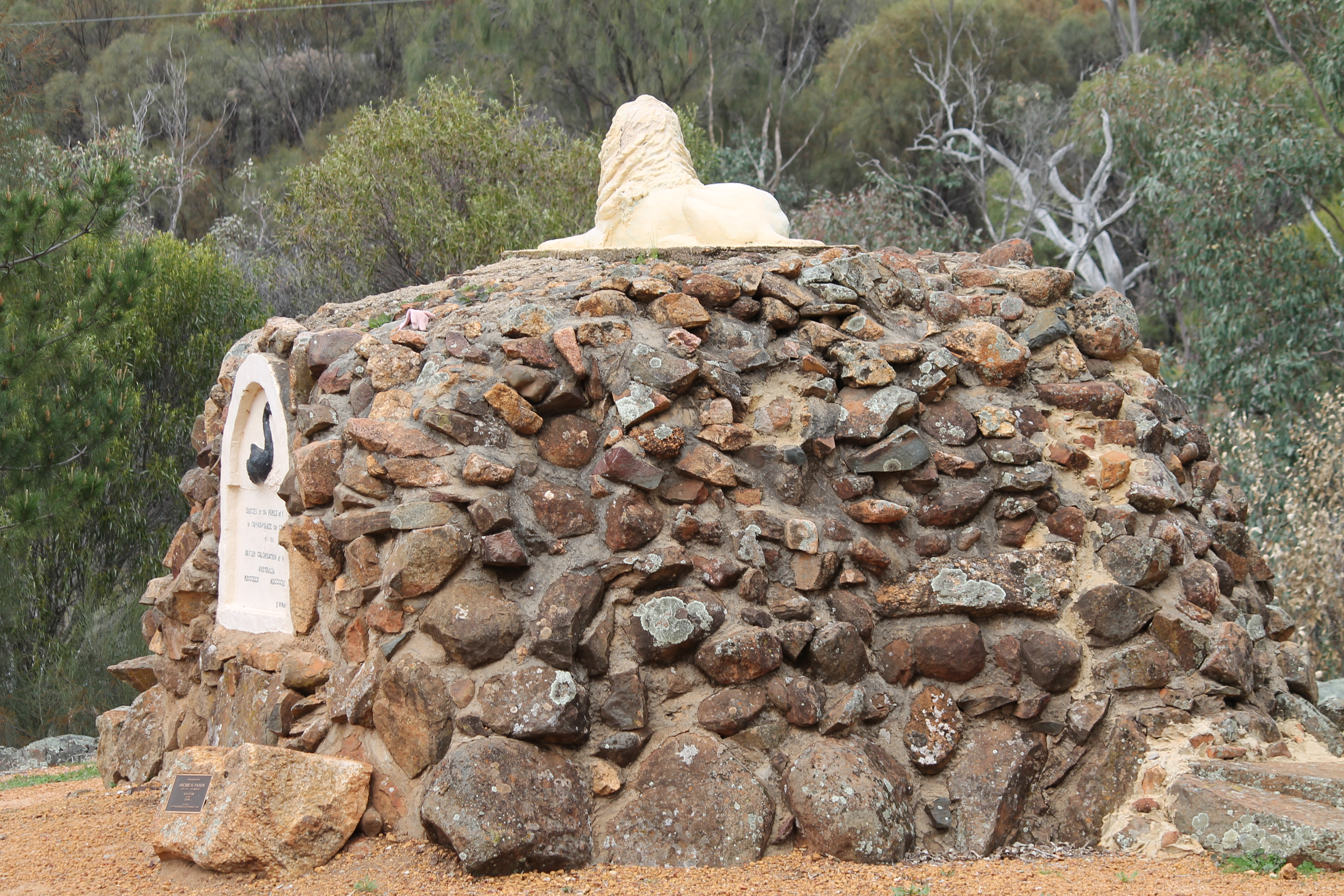
The Clackline School lion monument

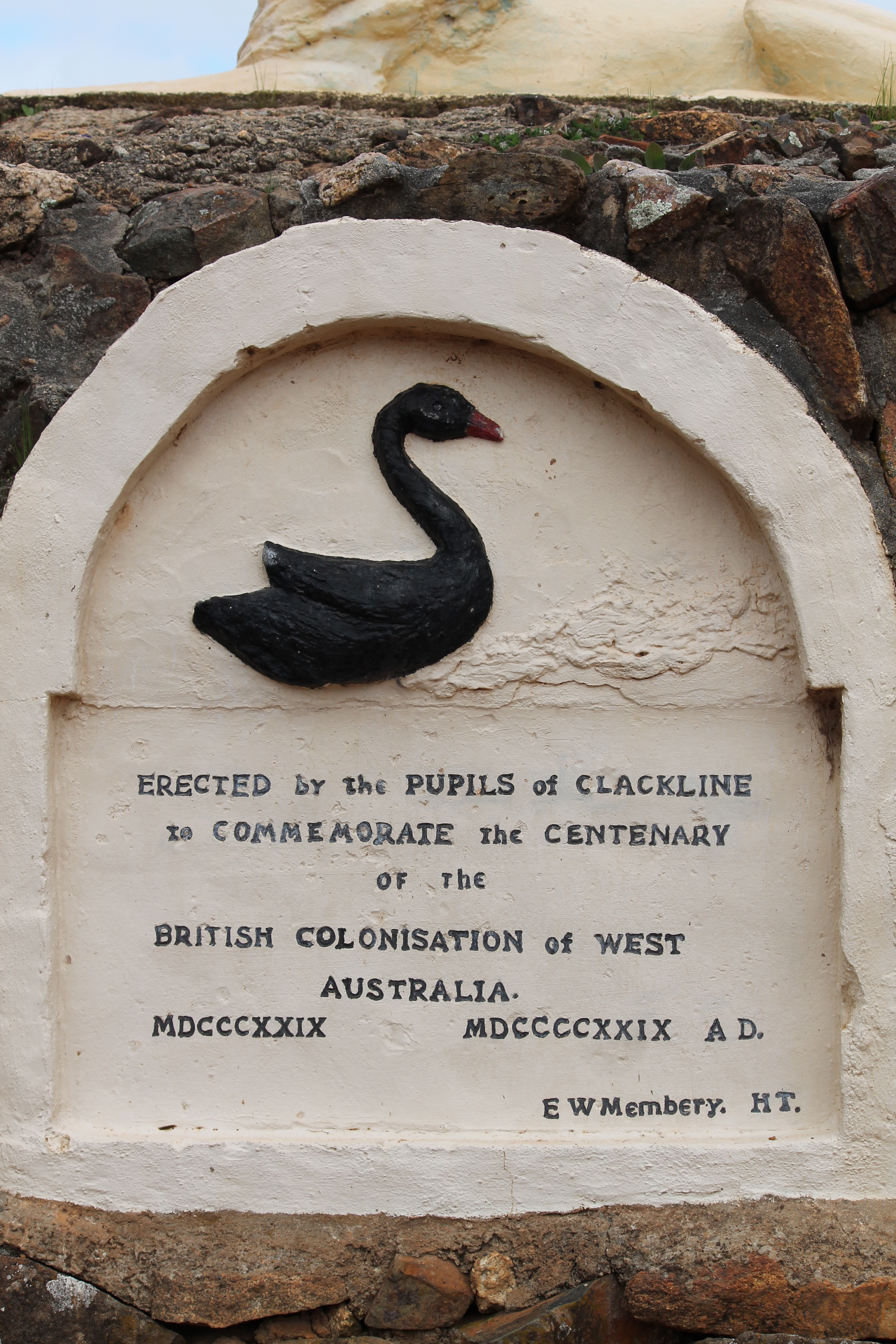
Plaque on the lion monument

In 1929, the school's students and headteacher, E.W.Membery commemorated the 100th anniversary of British colonisation by building a monument. The monument features a sculpture of a lion, with a plaque reading:

ERECTED by the PUPILS of CLACKLINE
to COMMEMORATE the CENTENARY
of the
BRITISH COLONISATION OF WEST
AUSTRALIA
MDCCCXXIX MDCCCCXXIX A D.
E.W.MEMBERY. H.T.

The sculptor of the lion was Archie H Paton, who has since been recognised with a nearby plaque. It is a stopping point on the Kep Track, adjacent to a picnic area and toilets.
