= Kep Track =

Track between Mundaring and Northam in Western Australia

- Length: 75 km (47 mi)
- Location: Between Mundaring and Northam, Western Australia
- Designation: Bicycle, Walking and Horse Trail
- Trailheads: Mundaring Weir (western terminus), Northam (eastern terminus)
- Use: Walking, Cycling, Trail Riding
- Difficulty: Grade 3
- Season: All year, but spring is best
- Hazards: Summer heat, Fire danger
- Right of way: Pedestrian, Cyclist, Rider
- Website: web.archive.org/web/20110312081610/http://www.keptrack.com.au/

Trail map
- The Kep Track is a bicycle, walking and horse track between Mundaring and Northam.

The Kep Track is a bicycle, walking and horse track in the Darling Range and further east in Western Australia.

It commences at Mundaring Weir and proceeds through Chidlow, Wooroloo, Wundowie, Bakers Hill and Clackline to Northam, for approximately 75 kilometres (47 mi). It is based on the route of the former Western Australian Government Railways Eastern Railway from Mundaring to Clackline, then following the Goldfields Water Supply Scheme pipeline route through to Northam.

The promotion and planning of the track is linked in with the Golden Pipeline Project of the National Trust of Western Australia.

== See also ==
- Eastern Railway (Western Australia)
- Railway Reserves Heritage Trail
- List of rail trails
- Bibbulmun Track
- Munda Biddi Trail

== Bibliography ==
- Affleck, Fred (1978). On Track: The Making of Westrail, 1950–1976. Perth: Westrail. ISBN 0724475605. OCLC 6489347.
- Elliot, Ian (1983). Mundaring a History of the Shire. Shire of Mundaring. ISBN 0-9592776-0-9.
- Quinlan, Howard; Newland, John R. (2000). Australian Railway Routes 1854-2000. Australian Railway Historical Society - New South Wales Division. ISBN 0-909650-49-7.
