= Clackline Brook =

Waterway in Western Australia

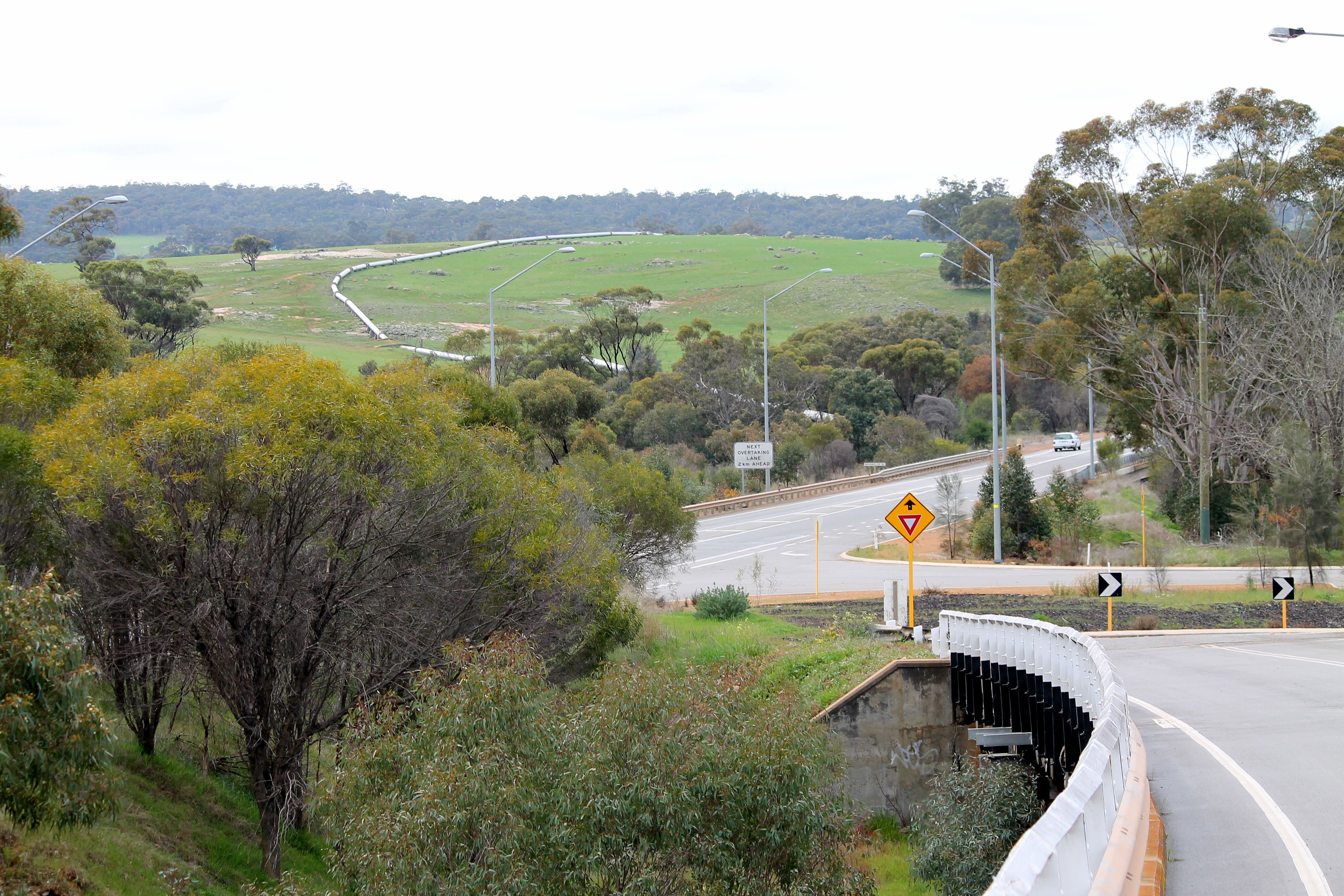
Clackline Brook Bridge. The bridge was a road bridge adjacent to the railway bridge that went over the Brook as well. The new alignment of the Great Eastern Highway runs over the brook to the left rear of the photograph view. At this point there was a junction, where the Great Eastern Highway, the Goldfields pipeline, and railways went different directions. It was known as 'Clackline Junction' in early railway publications.

Clackline Brook is an 11.6-kilometre-long (7.2 mi) waterway in the Wheatbelt region of Western Australia. From near Clackline, it runs east-south-easterly towards Mokine, before turning north and ending near Mokine Hill. Clackline Brook joins onto Spencers Brook, with the name changing at the confluence with Corolin Brook.

The area around Clackline Brook was where a number of Aboriginal families lived, with their territories defined by the surrounding waterways. The area is likely to still have spiritual and cultural significance, although as of 2002, there are no sites or communities registered with the Department of Land Administration or the Aboriginal Affairs Department.

European exploration of the Avon region began in 1830, with an expedition inland from Guildford led by Ensign Dale. Shortly thereafter the area was settled and farming began. Northam was gazetted in 1836, and over the next 50 years the surrounding region grew rapidly along with the agricultural industry – primarily wheat, sheep, and cattle farming. Land usage along the waterways has not changed significantly, but there has been a trend towards subdivision into smaller lots for hobby farming.

In 1906, the water found to be unsuitable for boiling purposes. A well that had been dug near Clackline Brook was abandoned due to high levels of lime and magnesia salts, and a dam in the brook near the Clackline railway station, meant to provide water for the locomotive engines, was also abandoned. Water was instead sourced from the Coolgardie water supply pipelines.

Great Eastern Highway's bypass of Clackline, including the heritage-listed Clackline Bridge, resulted in Clackline Brook being realigned through a large box culvert.
