= Chamberlain tractors =

Australian tractor brand

Chamberlain Industries Ltd
- Industry: Tractor manufacturing
- Founded: 1949
- Defunct: 1986
- Headquarters: Welshpool, Western Australia, Australia

Chamberlain was a brand of tractors from Australia, produced initially by Chamberlain Industries Ltd.

== History ==
=== Origins ===
During the 1930s, Bob Chamberlain – a tractor mechanic in Victoria – designed and built a prototype tractor, around what he believed farmers wanted and "suited to the large land holdings of Australian farmers..." The prototype became the basis of the later 40K model tractor.

=== Factory in WA ===
In the late 1940s, the Western Australian Government, having heard of Bob Chamberlain's plan to build tractors, persuaded his company to use an ex-munitions factory in Welshpool, Western Australia. The first tractors rolled off the production line in 1949.

The first Chamberlain tractor produced was the model 40K, which had 40 horsepower (30 kW) twin-cylinder, horizontally-opposed, kerosene-powered engines. The 40K weighed about four tonnes and was considered to be ideal for the needs of Australian farmers.

In 1953, Chamberlain started to produce diesel-powered tractors such as the GM diesel powered 60DA and later the 70DA, as well as the 55DA, which was powered by an Australian built diesel engine. A few years later, Chamberlain ceased the use of kerosene engines.

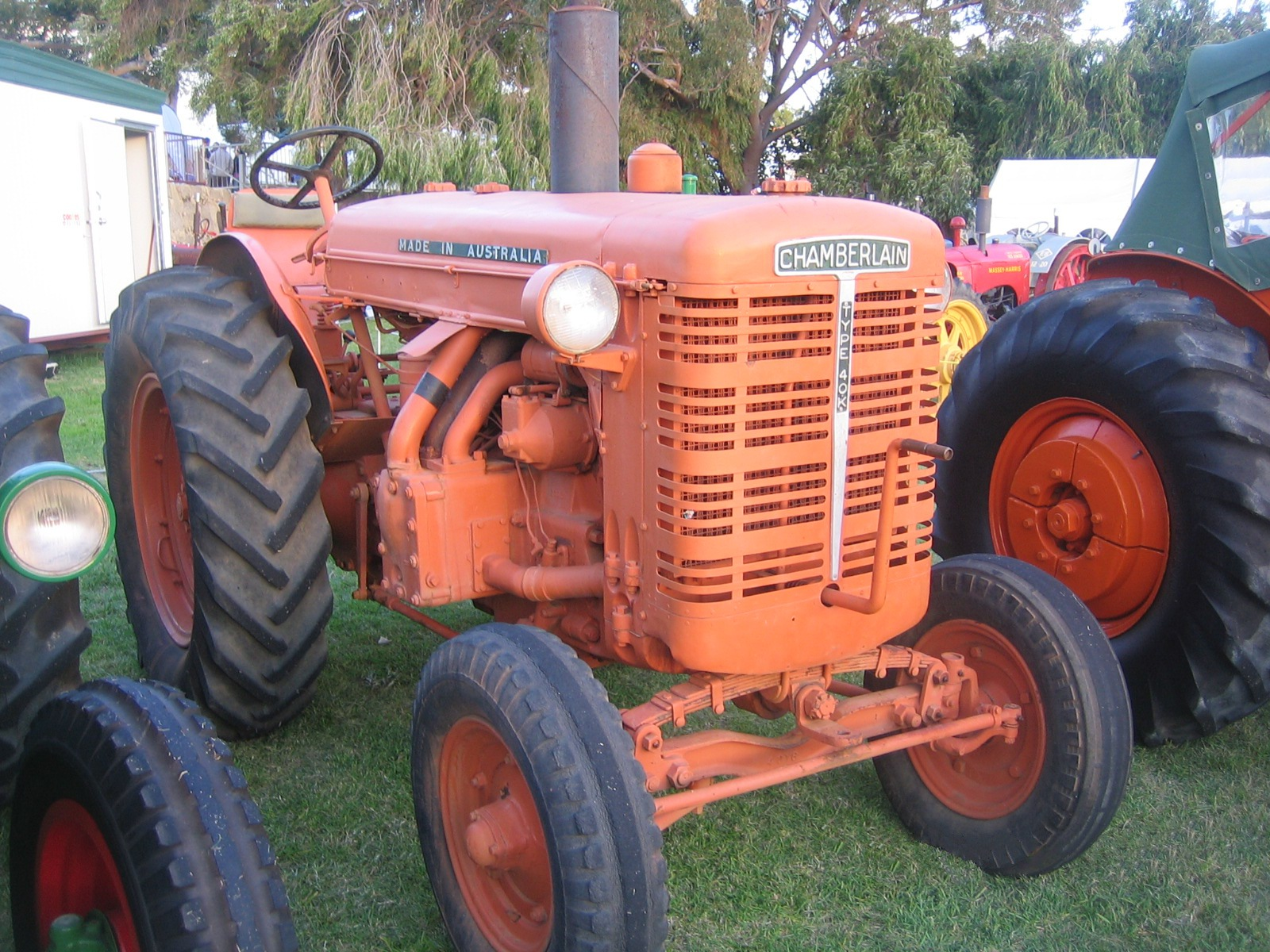
A Chamberlain 40K, the first model put into mass production by the company

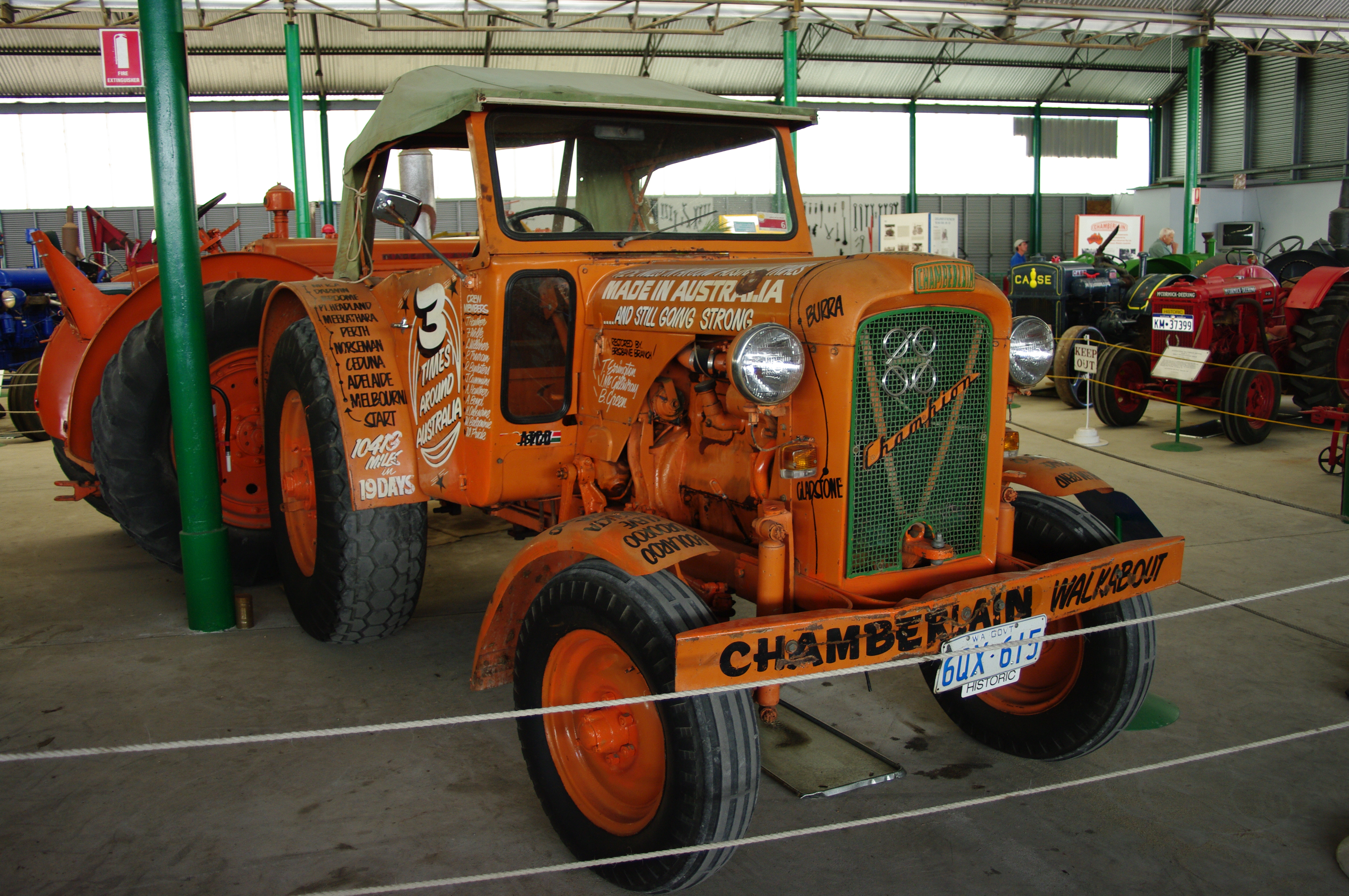
Tail End Charlie on display at Whiteman Park tractor museum

A Perkins diesel-powered model, the Champion, was introduced in 1955. In that same year, as a publicity stunt, Chamberlains entered a Champion in the around Australia Redex Trial as a rescue/recovery vehicle. That particular tractor became known as "Tail End Charlie". The tractor in question was fitted with modified cab, bench seat and high speed gears (allowing it to reach speeds of up to 110 km/hour). Initial attempts to enter the event were met with disbelief, and it was only officially recognised as a recovery vehicle for one leg of the trial. Tail-End Charlie is reputed to have completed one stage of the trial while towing as many as six other entrants that broke down on the way. In a subsequent trial, the authorities relented, and the Chamberlain machine completed the whole course.

In subsequent years, Chamberlain produced a range of larger tractors, also designed around broadacre farming in Australia. These tractors are now popular for heritage tractor pulling contests, and feature their own national championships.

=== Takeover by John Deere ===
In 1970, the John Deere company purchased a controlling interest in Chamberlain. During the 1980s, Chamberlain became a fully owned subsidiary of John Deere, and traded as Chamberlain John Deere.

An expansion and refit of the Welshpool plant was undertaken in 1978. The Welshpool manufacturing site was redeveloped and a new office complex built in 1982. However, by 1986, due to a decline in demand, manufacturing at Welshpool ceased, along with use of the Chamberlain name.

=== Legacy ===
In October 2024, a 5:1 scale sculpture of a Chamberlain 40K was unveiled at Carnamah, Western Australia. The sculpture thus became one of Australia's " big things".

== Gallery ==
Chamberlain tractors on display at the 2007 Perth Royal Show:

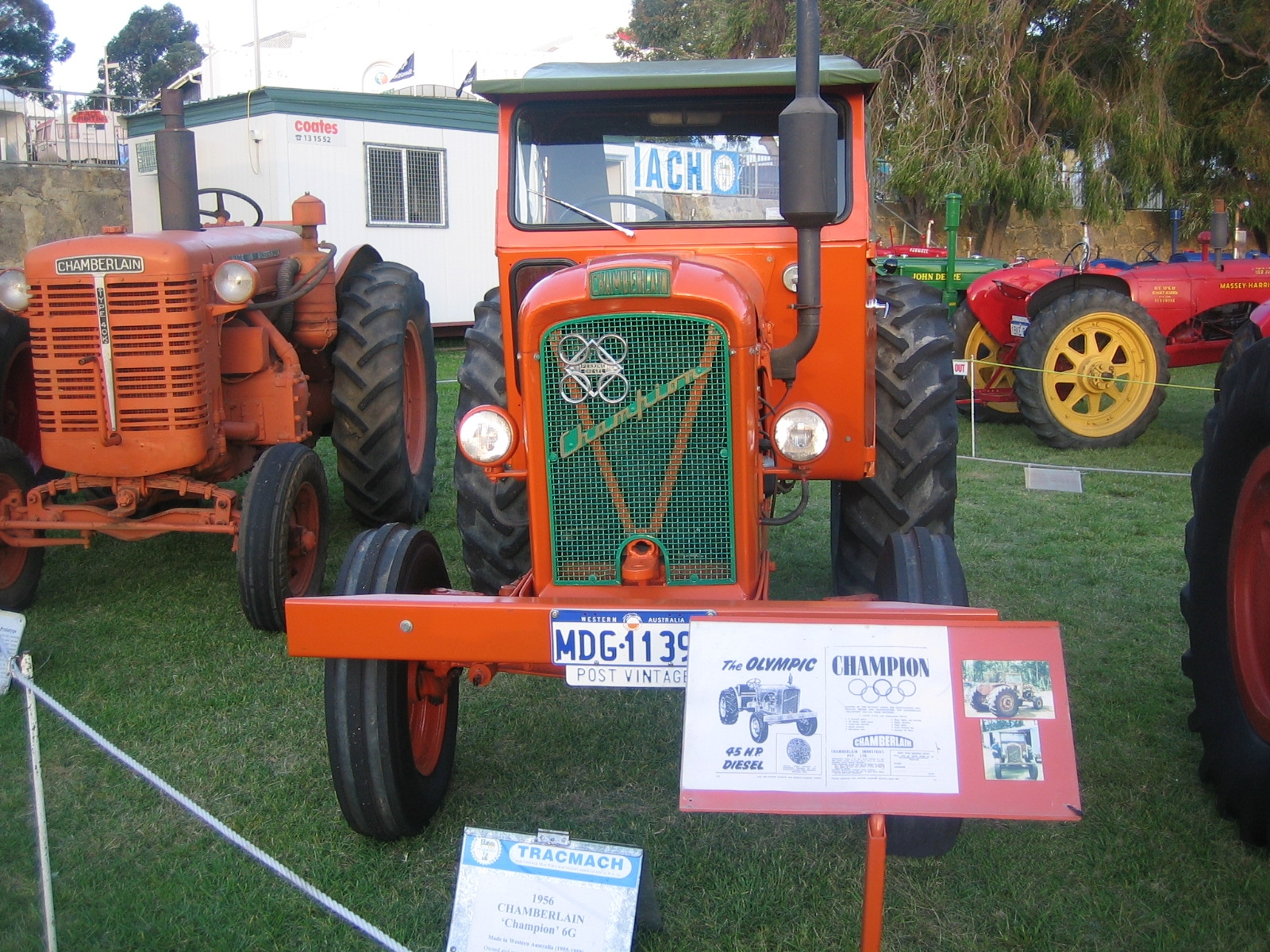
Chamberlain Champion 6G

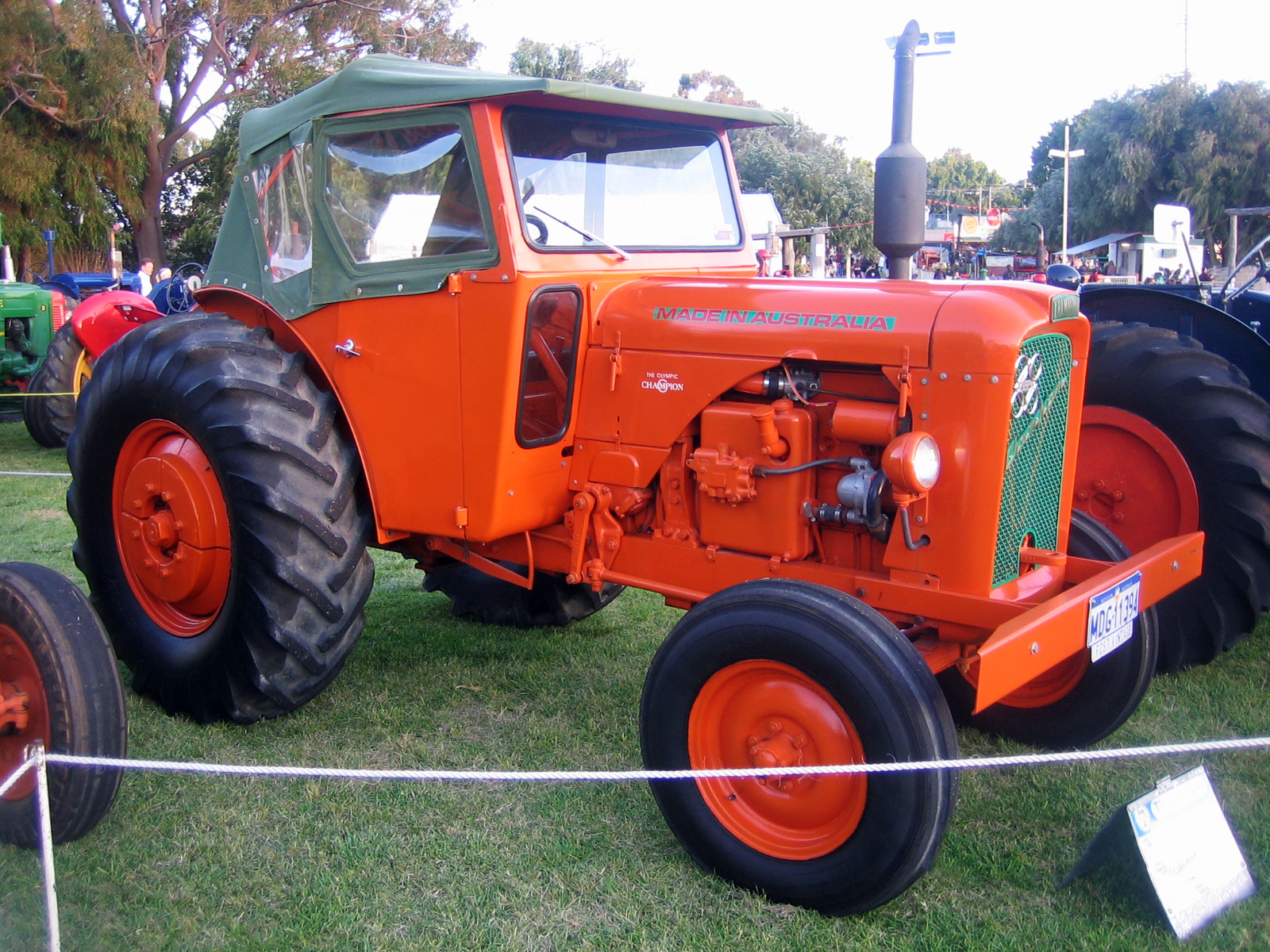
Chamberlain Champion 6G

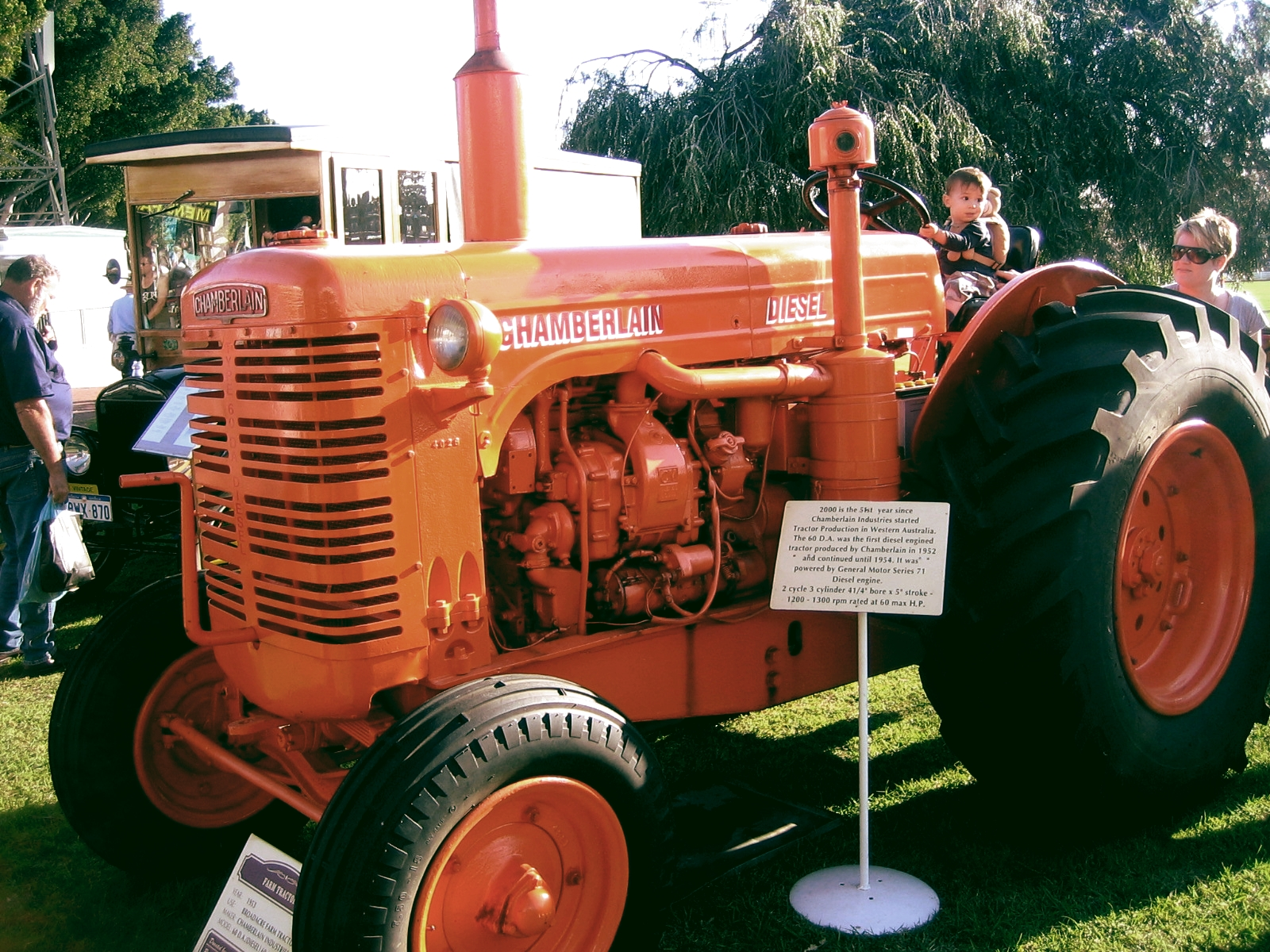
Chamberlain 60 D.A.
