= Charcoal iron =

Substance created by the smelting of iron ore with charcoal

Charcoal iron is the substance created by the smelting of iron ore with charcoal.

All ironmaking blast furnaces were fueled by charcoal until Abraham Darby introduced coke as a fuel in 1709. The more economical coke soon replaced charcoal in British furnaces, but in the United States, where timber for charcoal was abundant, charcoal furnaces lingered much longer. Even after the introduction of anthracite smelting to the US in 1839, and the development of American coke production later in the century, charcoal iron continued to find favor because of its heat-resistance, toughness, and malleability. The last charcoal furnace in the US did not close until 1945.

In Britain, the penultimate furnace built was Alderwasley in 1764, followed by Warsash Furnace in 1869. The last working furnace at Backbarrow converted to coke in 1922.

In Western Australia, pig iron was made using charcoal between 1948 and 1981 at Wundowie. At its peak, operating two charcoal-fueled blast furnaces, the Wundowie charcoal iron and wood distillation plant produced 52,262 tons of iron in 1960/61.

There are still charcoal-based iron and steel making operations in the Brazilian state of Minas Gerais.

The traditional Japanese tatara furnace uses charcoal and ironsand to produce a mixture of iron and steel. Small quantities are still made by the Nittoho Tatara in Japan. The tatara smelting process involves direct reduction and—unlike a blast furnace—at no time is the product fully molten. The smelted iron remains in the furnace for an extended period until much of the iron has converted to tamahagane, a steel suitable for making swords.

== See also ==
- Harrison Ainslie
- Wundowie charcoal iron and wood distillation plant

== Bibliography ==
- Bartholomew, Craig L.; Metz, Lance E. (1988). Bartholomew, Ann (ed.). The Anthracite Industry of the Lehigh Valley. Center for Canal History and Technology. ISBN 0-930973-08-9.
- Williams, Michael (2003). Deforesting the Earth. University of Chicago Press. p. 316. ISBN 0-226-89926-8.
