= Grass Valley, Western Australia =

Grass Valley
- Town
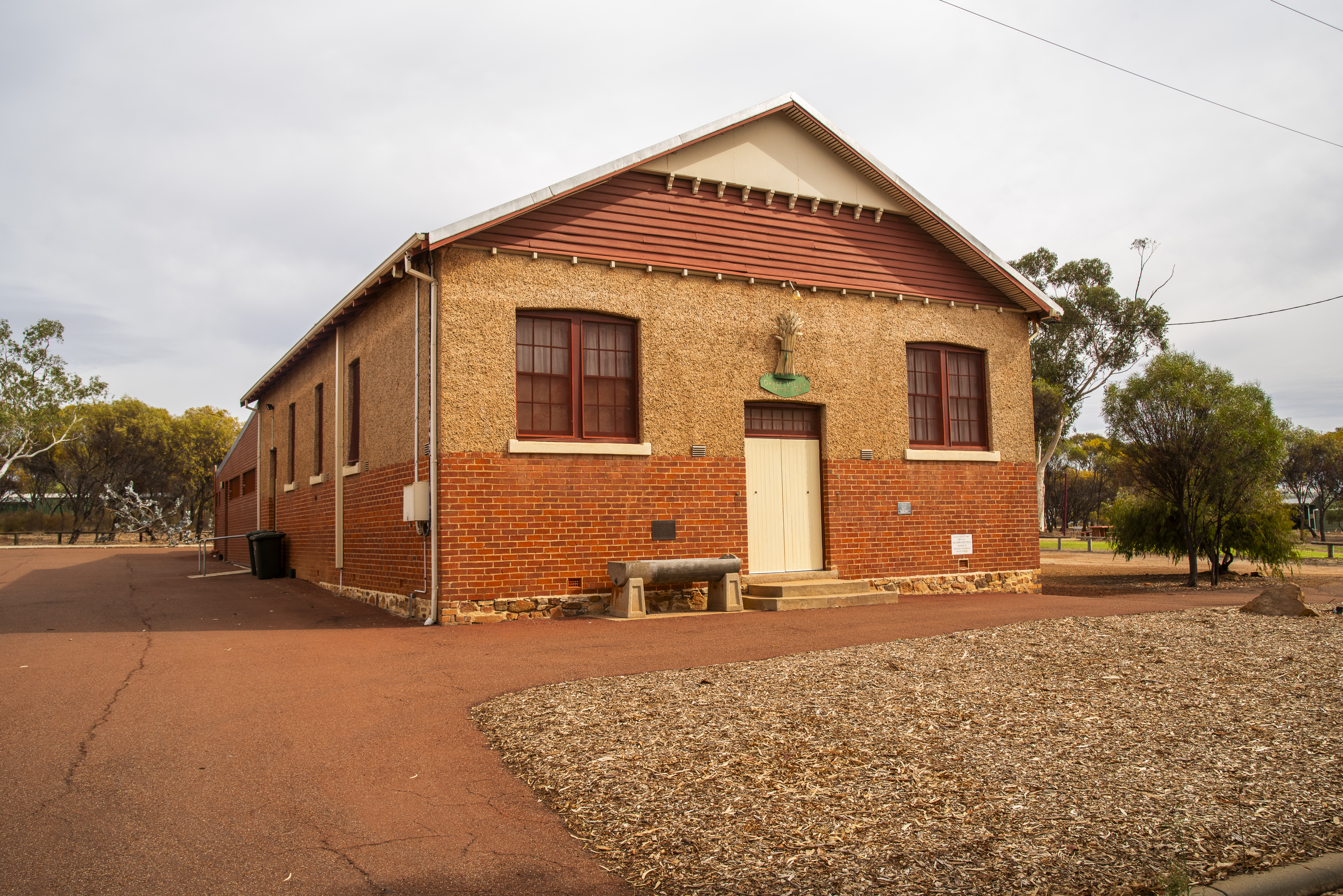
- Grass Valley town hall in 2024

- Interactive map of Grass Valley
- Coordinates: 31.639°S 116.806°E
- Country: Australia
- State: Western Australia
- LGA: Shire of Northam
- Location: 110 km (68 mi) ENE of Perth; 13 km (8.1 mi) E of Northam
- Established: 1898

Government
  - State electorate: Central Wheatbelt
  - Federal division: Pearce

Area
  - Total: 60.2 km^{2} (23.2 sq mi)
- Elevation: 215 m (705 ft)

Population
  - Total: 158 (SAL 2021)
- Postcode: 6403

Grass Valley is a small townsite 13 kilometres (8 mi) east of Northam, Western Australia in the Avon Valley area.

The town is named after a local property of the same name that was established in 1833 by William Nairn.

The Northam to Kalgoorlie Eastern Goldfields Railway line passes through the town and includes a crossing loop. The railway was built through the area in 1894. Land was set aside for a townsite in 1898 and the town was gazetted in the same year.

The surrounding areas produce wheat and other cereal crops. During its heyday of the 1950s–90s the town's local farmers were the largest producers of chaff (feed for racehorses) in Western Australia. The product was sought after by buyers throughout Western Australia as well as Asia and the Middle East. The town is a receival site for Cooperative Bulk Handling and had a Type B structure in the 1970s. The post office within the town is reputed to be the smallest in Australia. The town also has an excellent tavern dating back to the golden days of the once-important rail head. The town is situated on the Golden Pipeline heritage trail. The pipeline passes through Grass Valley.

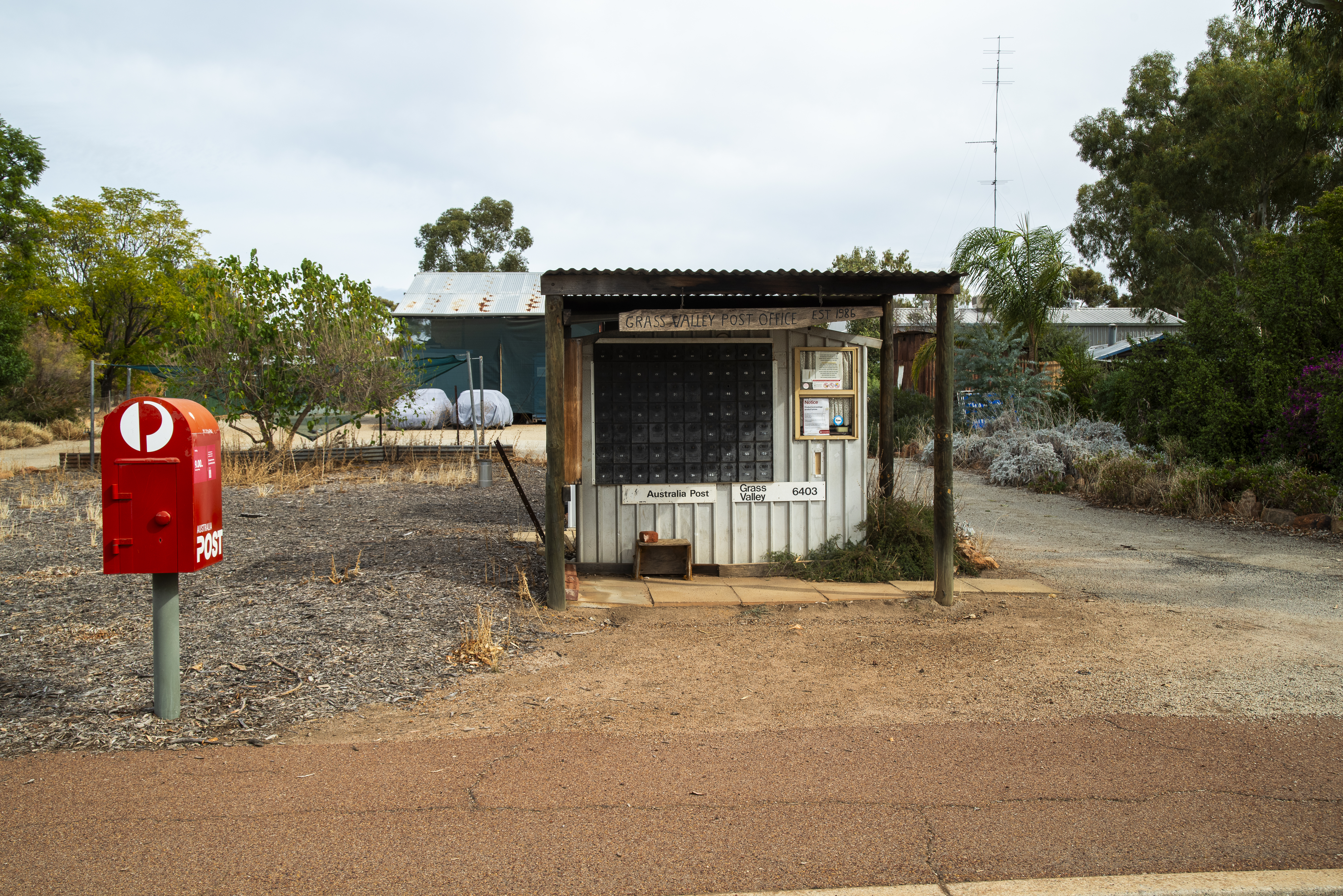
Grass Valley post office in 2024

Grass Valley and surrounding districts are serviced by the Grass Valley Bush Fire Brigade, supported by over 50 local volunteer members. The Brigade has one appliance being a 4.4B (4,000L, 4WD, Broadacre) truck, although it has been recognised for over 10 years that a second appliance is desperately needed to adequately protect the district. The Grass Valley fire district is the largest fire district within the Shire of Northam and the Brigade is the second most active Brigade in regards to call-outs in the Shire. The Grass Valley Fire Shed is located on the corner of Wilson St and Keane St, Grass Valley on the site of the old Grass Valley school which ran from 1899-1945.
