= Town of Northam =

Former local government area in Western Australia

Coordinates: 31°39′11″S 116°39′58″E

Town of Northam Western Australia
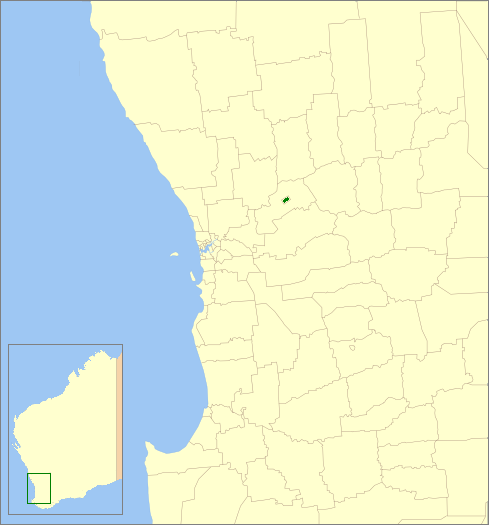
- Location in Western Australia
- Population: 6,009 (2006 census)
  - Density: 231/km^{2} (599/sq mi)
- Established: 1879
- Area: 26 km^{2} (10.0 sq mi)
- Council seat: Northam
- Region: Wheatbelt

The Town of Northam was a local government area of Western Australia for the town of Northam in the Wheatbelt region of Western Australia, 97 kilometres (60 mi) north-east of the capital, Perth along Great Eastern Highway. The Town had a population of 6,009 as of the 2006 census.

In January 2007, the Department of Local Government and Regional Development recommended the council merge with the surrounding Shire of Northam to become a single entity. Following the failure of a referendum on 28 April 2007 within the Shire of Northam to stop the move, the amalgamation proceeded on 1 July 2007.

== History ==
On 4 November 1879, the Municipality of Northam was constituted to govern the affairs of the town of Northam. The town expanded beyond the municipal boundaries, which were set at about 5 km^{2} (1.9 sq mi), and on 6 September 1957, the municipal boundaries were adjusted to bring all of Northam under it.

On 1 July 1961, the Municipality became a Town under the Local Government Act 1860.

== Amalgamation ==
In September 2006, the Town received a report into the possibility of merging with the Shire of Northam, and on 31 October 2006, the Local Government Advisory Board received a proposal to that effect from both councils. Public meetings in December 2006 announced that the new council would be known as the Shire of Northam, and would come into existence on 1 July 2007, initially operated by a board of commissioners (two from each entity plus an independent chair).

In January 2007, the Local Government Advisory Board officially recommended to the Minister for Local Government that the amalgamation proceed.

== Wards ==
The town had 9 councillors plus an elected mayor, and no wards.

== Population ==
Year	Population
1911	3,361
1921	3,602
1933	4,817
1947	4,652
1954	5,725
1961	7,200
1966	7,400
1971	7,117
1976	6,846
1981	6,944
1986	6,887
1991	6,549
1996	6,285
2001	6,137
2006	6,009
