= Broadacre =

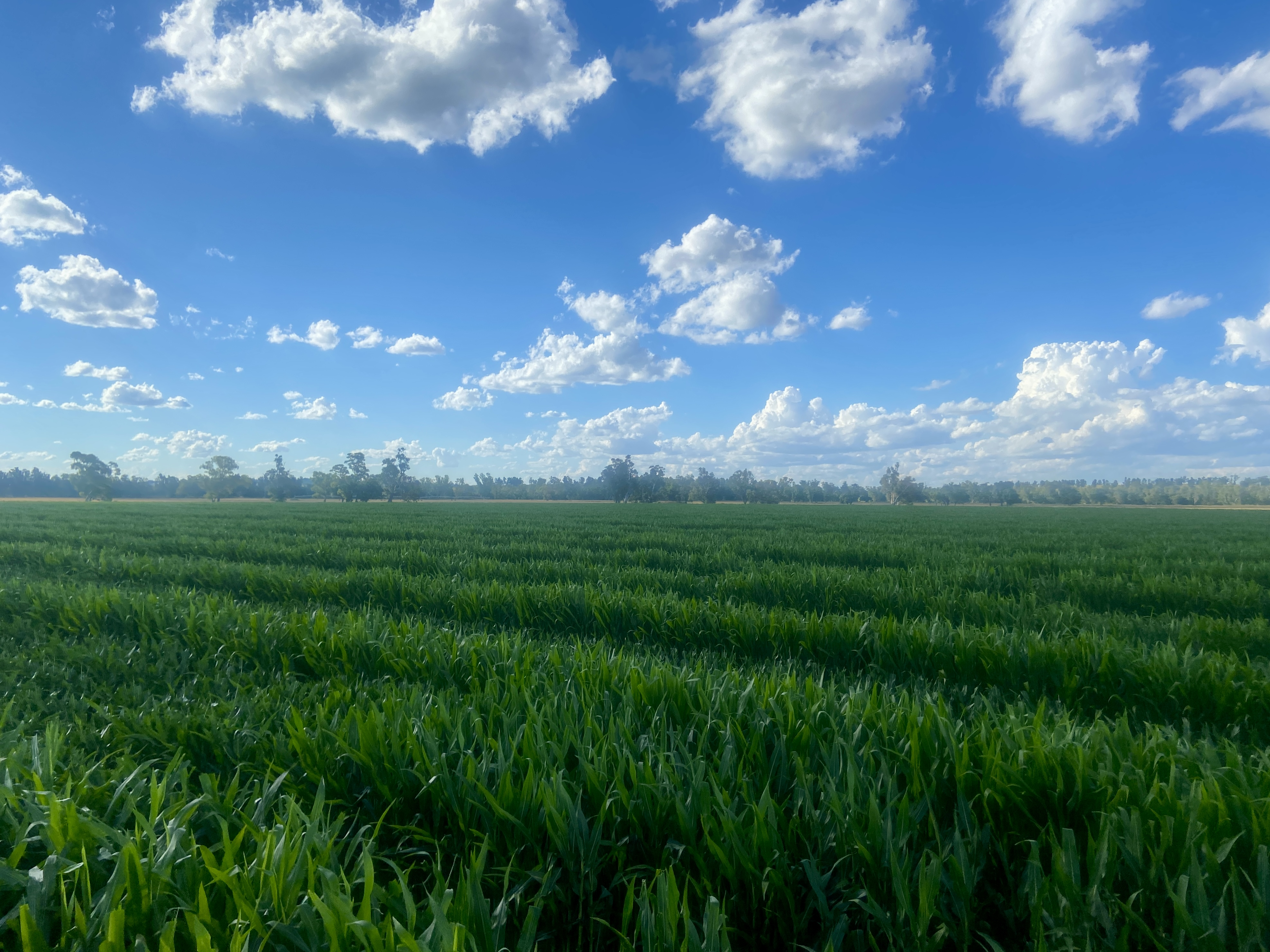
Broadacre corn in New South Wales, Australia

Broadacre in Australia is land suitable for farms practicing large-scale crop operations. The key crop segments in this category are as follows:

- oilseeds - canola, sunflowers
- winter and summer cereals - wheat, barley, oats, triticale, sorghum, maize, millets
- pulses - lupins, chickpeas, faba beans, field peas, mung beans, soybeans, lentils
- sugar cane
- rice

Within Australia today, these crops are farmed across more than 200,000 square kilometres (77,000 sq mi).

Broadacre is defined also as land parcels greater than 4,000 square metres (43,000 sq ft) and certain land-use criteria for all government land designated for release and future urban zoned land.
