= Clackline, Western Australia =

Clackline
- Town
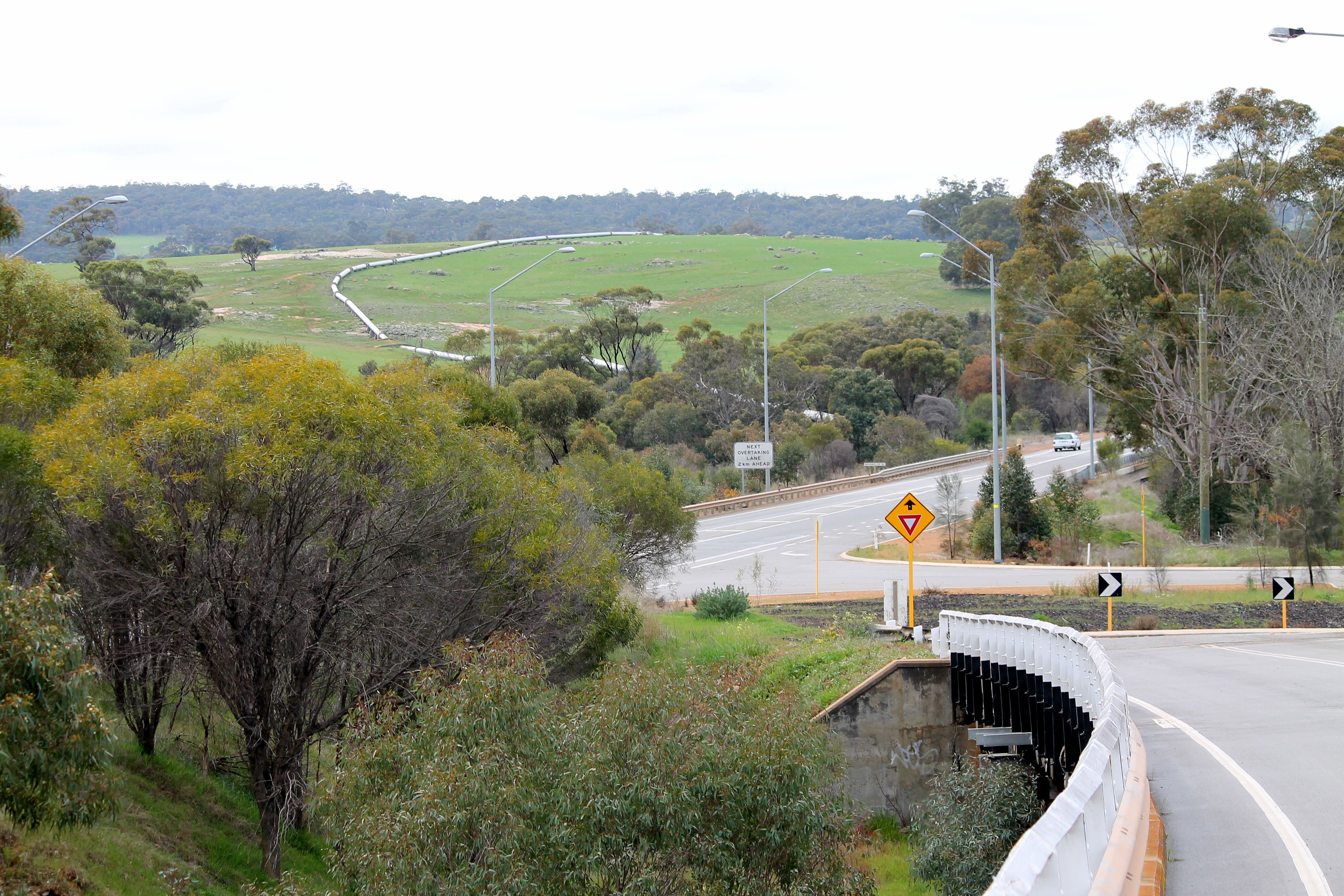
- Clackline Brook Bridge from the west

- Interactive map of Clackline
- Coordinates: 31.718°S 116.521°E
- Country: Australia
- State: Western Australia
- LGA: Shire of Northam
- Location: 80 km (50 mi) ENE of Perth; 17 km (11 mi) SW of Northam; 20 km (12 mi) S of Toodyay
- Established: 1896

Government
  - State electorate: Central Wheatbelt
  - Federal division: Bullwinkel

Area
  - Total: 48.3 km^{2} (18.6 sq mi)
- Elevation: 257 m (843 ft)

Population
  - Total: 330 (SAL 2021)
- Postcode: 6564

Clackline is a locality in the Wheatbelt region of Western Australia, about 80 kilometres (50 mi) east-north-east of Perth. The settlement was established in the 1880s and the town was gazetted in 1896.

== History ==
John Forrest, later Premier of Western Australia, recorded the name Clackline in 1879 but the origin of the word is unknown. A settlement was established in the 1880s, being at the junction of the Perth-Newcastle Road and the township was gazetted in 1896.

It has also been known as Clackline Junction for the road and the rail junction.

It was an important junction for the Eastern Railway lines to Northam, and Toodyay on the Clackline–Miling railway branch. The railway service through Clackline was closed in 1966 at the time the Avon Valley route of the Eastern Railway was opened.

== Geography ==
Clackline is in the Wheatbelt region of Western Australia, about 80 kilometres (50 mi) east-north-east of Perth, and 17 kilometres (11 mi) south-west of Northam.

Clackline Brook is an 11.6-kilometre-long (7.2 mi) waterway that runs from near Clackline towards Mokine before turning north and ending near Mokine Hill.

Clackline Nature Reserve is on Refractory Road.

== Demographics ==
In the 2021 census, Clackline had an estimated population of 330 people.

== Economy ==
The Clackline area produces some of the highest grade export hay (oaten) in Australia, and is home to wine growing ventures and an olive grove producing extra virgin olive oils.

== Attractions ==
There are several historic sites, including heritage listed sites, located in and around the Clackline townsite.

=== Avro Anson Memorial ===
The Avro Anson Memorial commemorates four Royal Australian Air Force (RAAF) airmen killed when their Avro Anson aircraft crashed near Clackline on 9 October 1942. The memorial site is located on the low side of Avro Anson Road, in a small park approximately five kilometres (3.1 mi) south-east of Clackline. The memorial, assembled by members of the local community in the months following the crash, features a cairn of granite and boulders supporting a jarrah cross. The names and details of the deceased airmen − Flying Officer Lynton Birt, Sergeant Geoffrey Debenham, Sergeant Noel Nixon, and Sergeant Kenneth Hugo − are carved into the cross. Over the years, the memorial was forgotten and lost, overgrown by shrubs and trees. Upon its rediscovery in the early 1980s, the memorial's history and significance were researched, and it was restored in 1984 by volunteers from the Perth branch of the Royal Australian Air Force Association. Since then, the association has held annual memorial services at the site.

=== Clackline Bridge ===
Clackline Bridge is a historic road bridge in Clackline that carried the Great Eastern Highway until 2008. It is the only bridge in Western Australia to have spanned both a waterway and railway, the Clackline Brook and the former Eastern Railway alignment. The mainly timber bridge has a unique curved and sloped design, due to the difficult topography and the route of the former railway. The bridge was designed in 1934 to replace two dangerous rail crossings and a rudimentary water crossing. Construction began in January 1935, and was completed relatively quickly, with the opening ceremony held in August 1935. The bridge has undergone various improvement and maintenance works since then, including widening by three metres (10 ft) in 1959–60, but remained a safety hazard, with increasing severity and numbers of accidents through the 1970s and 1980s. Planning for a highway bypass of Clackline and the Clackline Bridge began in the 1990s, and it was constructed between January 2007 and February 2008. The local community had been concerned that the historic bridge would be lost, but it remains in use as part of the local road network, and has been listed on both the Northam Municipal Heritage Inventory and the Heritage Council of Western Australia's Register of Heritage Places.

=== Clackline Refractory ===
The Clackline Refractory is a heritage listed brickworks site in Clackline, located on Refractory Road in a valley near Great Eastern Highway. An abundant supply of fine quality clay was discovered in Clackline in 1898, which led to the establishment of a quarry and refractory. By 1901, the industry was important to Western Australia, with the brick products from Clackline used by multiple government departments, the Fremantle Gas and Coke Company, and many goldmines. Other users of the bricks included the Railway Department, the Perth Gas Company, the Fremantle smelter, and the Great Boulder Perseverance Company. The Clackline Refractory also supplied bricks for the nearby pumping stations for the Goldfields Water Supply Scheme. As of 2012, the site is in poor condition and mostly deserted, apart from stacks of various ceramic products. As well as kilns suitable for modern-day production, the site has older kilns constructed from bricks, with corrugated iron roofs supported by metal poles. Alongside these structures is a large brick chimney.

=== Lion monument ===
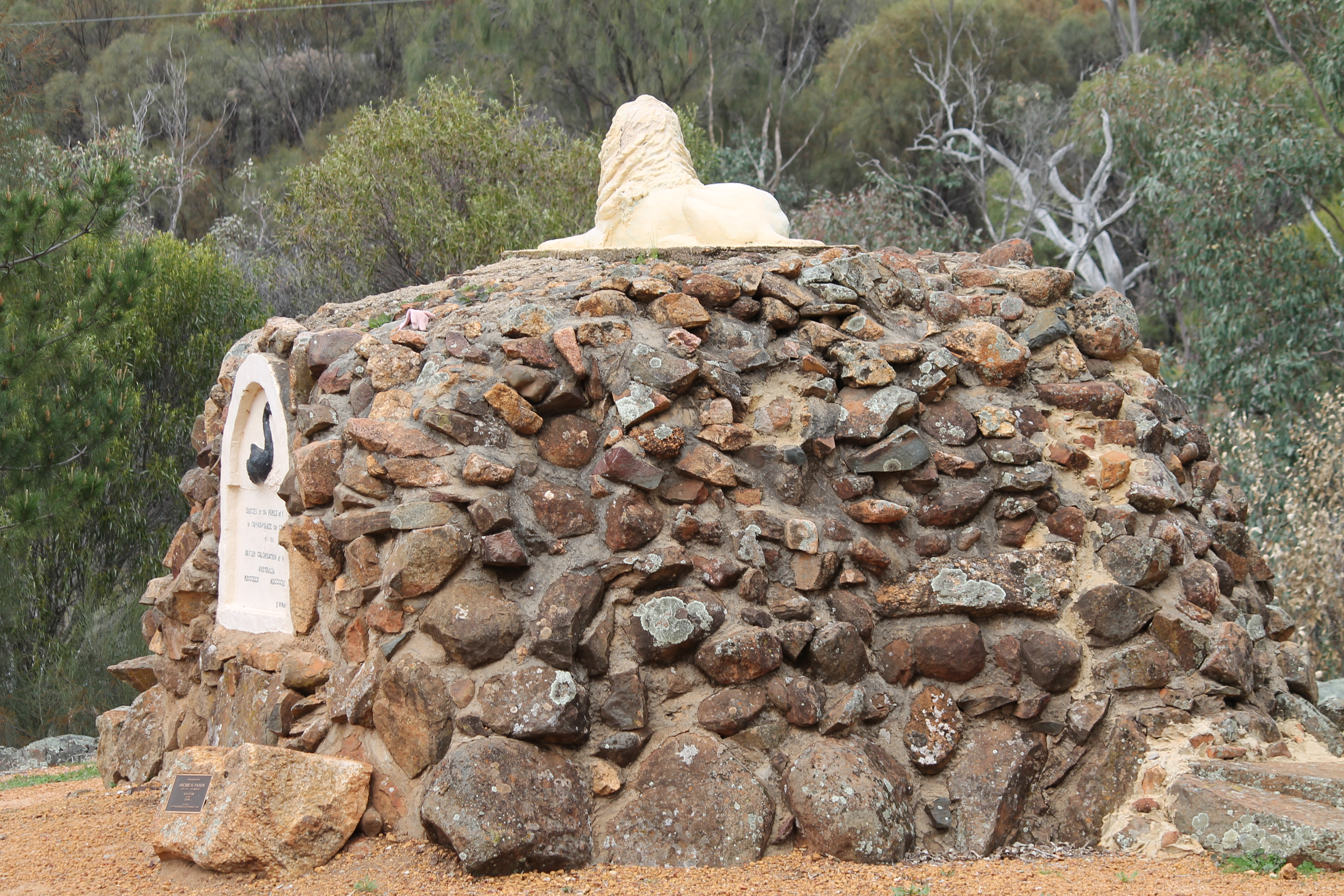
The Clackline School lion monument

In 1929, Clackline School's students and headteacher, E.W.Membery commemorated the 100th anniversary of British colonisation by building a monument. The monument features a sculpture of a lion, with a plaque reading:

ERECTED by the PUPILS of CLACKLINE
to COMMEMORATE the CENTENARY
of the
BRITISH COLONISATION OF WEST
AUSTRALIA
MDCCCXXIX MDCCCCXXIX A D.
E.W.MEMBERY. H.T.

The sculptor of the lion was Archie H Paton, who has since been recognised with a nearby plaque. It is a stopping point on the Kep Track, adjacent to a picnic area and toilets.

=== Rail heritage sites ===
A restored rail carriage, serving as a museum, was installed by the now-defunct Clackline Railway Committee. The railway carriage has been used as a venue for community events, such as farmers markets and weddings, and now serves as the community post office. It is located south of Great Eastern Highway, opposite the old general store site, but a walking trail passing under the highway connects to the remains of the Clackline railway station. After the general store and local post office closed, the Clackline Progress Association decided the community needed a local post office. In 2018 they canvassed community support, which was strong, so volunteers cleaned up and opened a community post office.

== Government ==
Clackline is located within the Shire of Northam. It is within the state electorate of Central Wheatbelt, and federal Division of Bullwinkel.

== Infrastructure ==
Clackline is reliant on the road network as the only available means of transportation. It is situated alongside Great Eastern Highway, which has bypassed the townsite since February 2008. The highway connects traffic south-west to Perth, and north-east to Northam and beyond. Other important roads in the area are Clackline–Toodyay Road, leading north to Toodyay, and Spencers Brook Road, heading south-east to Spencers Brook and then on to York.

== Education ==
Clackline historically had its own primary school, until the late 1970s. Clackline School, later known as Clackline Primary School, opened in 1896, and was extended and renovated several times before relocating in 1954 to a new site on the same road. The school was closed down in 1976, but in 1980 became the temporary location of the Avon Valley Church's school. Since then, the closest primary schools to Clackline are in Northam, Bakers Hill and Wundowie.

The nearest high schools as well as further education campuses are located in Northam: Northam Senior High School, St Joseph's High School, C. Y. O'Connor College of TAFE, and the Muresk Institute.

== Media ==
In addition to the statewide newspapers The West Australian and The Sunday Times, Clackline is served by the Northam-based Avon Valley Advocate.

== See also ==
- Clackline travel guide from Wikivoyage
- Media related to Clackline, Western Australia at Wikimedia Commons
