= Shire of Northam =

Local government area in the Wheatbelt region of Western Australia

Coordinates: 31°39′11″S 116°39′58″E

- Local government area
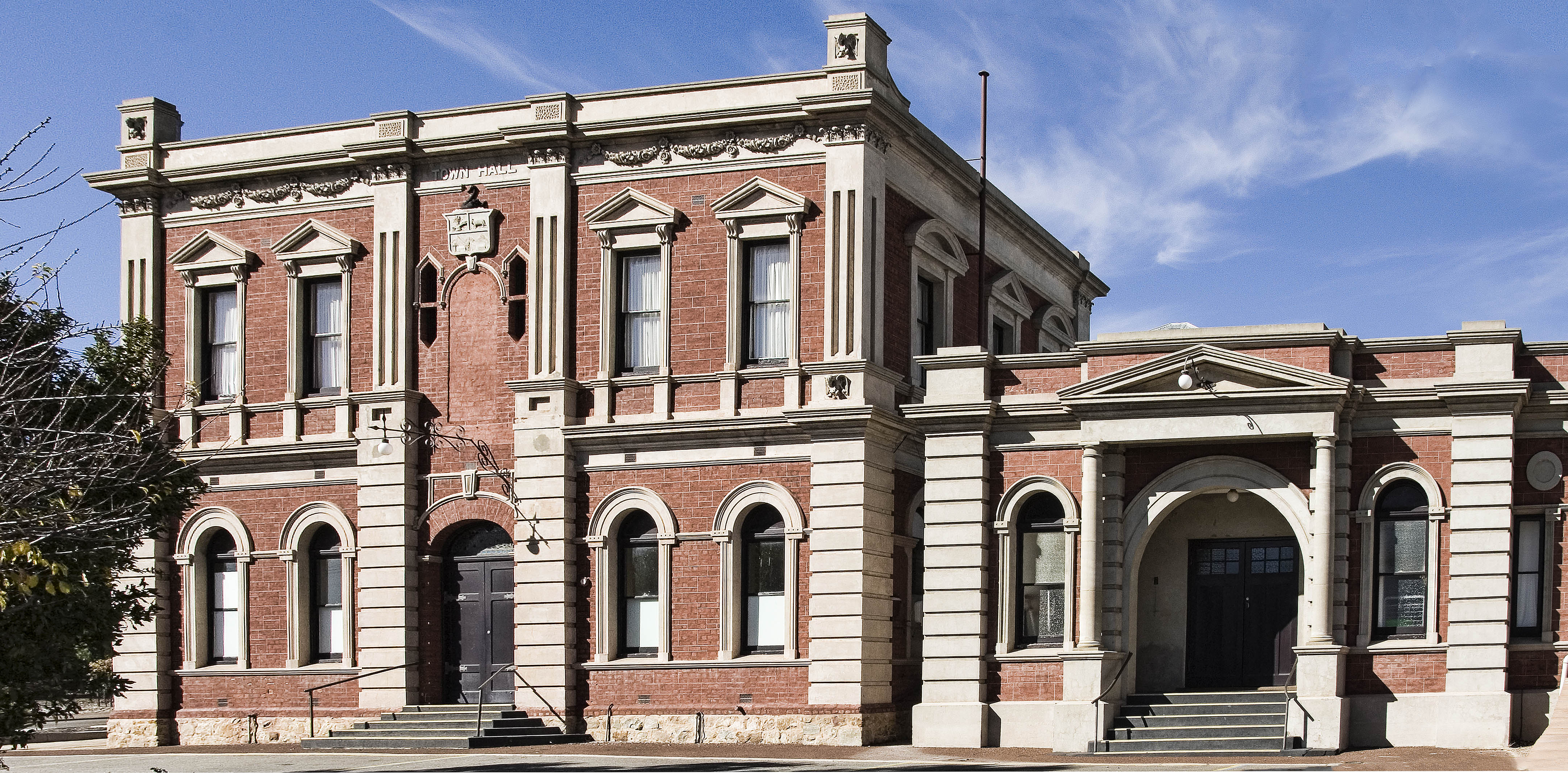
- The Northam Town Hall

- Interactive map of Shire of Northam
- Country: Australia
- State: Western Australia
- Region: Wheatbelt
- Established: 1871
- Council seat: Northam

Government
  - Shire President: Chris Antonio
  - State electorate: Central Wheatbelt
  - Federal division: Bullwinkel

Area
  - Total: 1,431.5 km^{2} (552.7 sq mi)

Population
  - Total: 11,358 (LGA 2021)
- Website: Shire of Northam
LGAs around Shire of Northam
Toodyay	Goomalling	Cunderdin
Swan	Shire of Northam	Cunderdin
Mundaring	York	Quairading

The Shire of Northam is a local government area in the Wheatbelt region of Western Australia, beyond the northeastern fringe of the Perth metropolitan area centred on the town of Northam itself. The Shire covers an area of 1,431 square kilometres (553 sq mi). In 2007, it merged with the Town of Northam, almost tripling its population in the process from a previous size of 3,794 (ABS 2006).

== History ==
On 24 January 1871, the Northam Road District was constituted under the Road Boards Act 1871. On 4 November 1879, the separate Municipality of Northam was constituted to manage the town of Northam. The town expanded beyond the municipal boundaries (which were set at about 5 km^{2} (1.9 sq mi)) and on 6 September 1957, the municipal boundaries were adjusted to bring all of Northam under it. The Road District lost a significant part of its population in this transfer.

On 1 July 1961, the Road District became a shire under the Local Government Act 1960, which reformed all remaining road districts into shires.

== Amalgamation ==
In September 2006, the Shire received a report into the possibility of merging with the Town of Northam, and on 31 October 2006, the Local Government Advisory Board received a proposal to that effect from both councils. Public meetings in December 2006 announced that the new council would be known as the Shire of Northam, and would come into existence on 1 July 2007, initially operated by a board of commissioners (two from each entity plus an independent chair).

In January 2007, the Local Government Advisory Board officially recommended to the Minister for Local Government that the amalgamation proceed. The Shire electors successfully petitioned for a referendum within their area, which was held on 28 April 2007. Prior to the election, the Shire of Northam itself took the unusual step of asking its electors not to vote, in order to deny the referendum the 50% of voters needed to constitute a valid poll under Clause 10 of Schedule 2.1 of the Local Government Act 1995. With a participation rate of 23.59%, a majority of 93% voted against the proposal. This 23.59% voter participation equates to 596 voters; less than the number that petitioned for the referendum in the first place.

The amalgamation proceeded as planned and the first elections for seats in the new council were held in October 2007.

== Wards ==
The Shire has been divided into four wards.

- Town Ward (five councillors)
- Central Ward (two councillors)
- West Ward (two councillors)
- East Ward (one councillor)

== Towns and localities ==
The towns and localities of the Shire of Northam with population and size figures based on the most recent Australian census:

Locality	Population	Area	Map
Bakers Hill	1,276 (SAL 2021)	83.9 km^{2} (32.4 sq mi)	
Buckland	56 (SAL 2021)	56.9 km^{2} (22.0 sq mi)	
Burlong	340 (SAL 2021)	42 km^{2} (16 sq mi)	
Clackline	330 (SAL 2021)	48.3 km^{2} (18.6 sq mi)	
Copley	70 (SAL 2021)	99.1 km^{2} (38.3 sq mi)	
Grass Valley	158 (SAL 2021)	60.2 km^{2} (23.2 sq mi)	
Irishtown	98 (SAL 2021)	54.2 km^{2} (20.9 sq mi)	
Jennapullin	75 (SAL 2021)	105.4 km^{2} (40.7 sq mi)	
Katrine	66 (SAL 2021)	83.2 km^{2} (32.1 sq mi)	
Malabaine	51 (SAL 2021)	50.9 km^{2} (19.7 sq mi)	
Meenaar	29 (SAL 2021)	75.3 km^{2} (29.1 sq mi)	
Mokine	216 (SAL 2021)	52.9 km^{2} (20.4 sq mi)	
Muluckine	209 (SAL 2021)	67.3 km^{2} (26.0 sq mi)	
Muresk	15 (SAL 2021)	29.8 km^{2} (11.5 sq mi)	
Northam	6,679 (SAL 2021)	26.8 km^{2} (10.3 sq mi)	
Southern Brook	91 (SAL 2021)	112.8 km^{2} (43.6 sq mi)	
Spencers Brook	84 (SAL 2021)	53.3 km^{2} (20.6 sq mi)	
Throssell	88 (SAL 2021)	107.9 km^{2} (41.7 sq mi)	
Woottating	65 (SAL 2021)	167.3 km^{2} (64.6 sq mi)	
Wundowie	1,372 (SAL 2021)	53.4 km^{2} (20.6 sq mi)	

== Population ==
The historic populations of the area which now forms the Shire of Northam are as follows. "Old Shire" relates to the pre-2007 boundaries.

Year	Population		
Year	Combined	Town	Old Shire
1911	5,146	3,361	1,785
1921	5,755	3,602	2,153
1933	7,019	4,817	2,202
1947	6,934	4,652	2,282
1954	10,307	5,725	4,582
1961	9,993	7,200	2,793
1966	10,094	7,400	2,694
1971	9,543	7,117	2,426
1976	9,385	6,846	2,539
1981	9,533	6,944	2,589
1986	9,338	6,887	2,451
1991	9,428	6,549	2,879
1996	9,485	6,285	3,200
2001	9,702	6,137	3,565
2006	9,803	6,009	3,794
2011	10,557	6,580	3,977
2016	11,112	6,548	4,564
2021	11,358	6,679	4,679

== Heritage-listed places ==
As of 2023, 166 places are heritage-listed in the Shire of Northam,^{[N1]} of which 40 are on the State Register of Heritage Places.^{[N2]}

== See also ==
- Town of Northam

== Notes ==
- ^[N1] A search for Northam LGA returns 392 hits, of which 221 are for the Northampton LGA, 166 are for Northam LGA while five are multi-region entries
- ^[N2] A search for Northam LGA returns 70 hits, of which 30 are for the Northampton LGA and 40 for Northam LGA
