= Wundowie =

- Town
- Interactive map of Wundowie
- Coordinates: 31°46′00″S 116°23′00″E
- Country: Australia
- State: Western Australia
- LGA: Shire of Northam
- Location: 67 km (42 mi) NE of Perth; 33 km (21 mi) WSW of Northam
- Established: 1947

Government
  - State electorate: Central Wheatbelt
  - Federal division: Bullwinkel

Area
  - Total: 53.4 km^{2} (20.6 sq mi)
- Elevation: 235 m (771 ft)

Population
  - Total: 868 (UCL 2021)
- Postcode: 6560

Wundowie is a town in Western Australia located between Perth and Northam in the Darling Range. It was the location of an iron works, and siding and stopping place on the Eastern Railway.

It was named in 1907 and was a siding on the Chidlow to Northam section of the railway. The origin of the name is from nearby Woondowing Spring which is an Aboriginal word thought to come from Ngwundow, meaning "to lie down".

Following the decision of the government to construct the blast furnace and wood distillation plant (to produce charcoal) in 1943 at Wundowie, plans were made to develop the townsite. Lots were surveyed in 1946 and the town was gazetted in 1947.

The design of the town was based on the concepts of the garden city movement of town planning. This is reflected in its street pattern, subdivision layout, location of land uses, open space and the civic core of the town. Construction of the town was by the Western Australian Department of Housing.

The charcoal iron works commenced production in 1948, and the railway station was opened in 1949. In 1974 the plant was sold to Agnew-Clough Ltd and upgraded. By 1979, a shortage of hardwood timber resulted in the saw mill being closed. In 1981 iron production ceased.

The railway line was continued for a while from Northam to service Wundowie – after the main closure of the Chidlows route and the opening of the Avon Valley route in 1966.

== Transport ==
=== Bus ===
- 331 Wundowie to Mundaring – serves Hawke Avenue, Boronia Avenue, Zamia Terrace, Banksia Avenue and Werribee Road

== Hurricane Go Kart Club ==
Wundowie
- Website: https://hurricanegokartclub.com.au/
- Length: 753 m (0.468 mi)

In 1961, the Hurricane Go Kart Club (often abbreviated to HGKC) was opened on Burma Road. The circuit was upgraded in 1993, and extensions carried out in 2002 saw the track length increase to 753 meters. At 8 meters wide, it is licensed for 32 karts to be on the track at any one time although it has room to host events with up to 500 entrants. As of 2026, it is one of 3 permanent Go Kart tracks in the Perth area

== See also ==
- Wundowie charcoal iron and wood distillation plant
