= Spencers Brook, Western Australia =

Locality in Western Australia

Spencers Brook
- Town
- Coordinates: 31.737°S 116.631°E
- Country: Australia
- State: Western Australia
- LGA(s): Shire of Northam

Government
  - State electorate(s): Central Wheatbelt
  - Federal division(s): Durack

Area
  - Total: 53.3 km^{2} (20.6 sq mi)

Population
  - Total(s): 84 (SAL 2021)
- Postcode: 6401

Spencers Brook (or Spencer's Brook) is a waterway, locality and a district located within the Avon Valley in Western Australia.

The locality is sited between the towns of Northam and York, about 95 kilometres (60 mi) east of the state capital, Perth. It is a part of the Central Ward administered by the Shire of Northam. Spencers Brook can be accessed from Clackline to the west or Northam to the north, via Spencers Brook Rd, or from York to the south via Spencers Brook-York Rd. At the 2006 census, Spencers Brook had a population of 195. Spencers Brook, as a locality, was originally named Brookton by the landowner, Thomas Wilding, who built the historical Brookton Hotel in 1884 (renamed Spencers Brook Hotel in 1920) and which continues to trade to this day as Spencers Brook Tavern; it also features nearby the Muresk Institute, Curtin University's school of agribusiness, applied biosciences and environmental biology.

The closest commercial centre is Northam, located approximately 15 kilometres north of Spencers Brook.

== Railway junction ==
It was an important rail junction, being the point at which trains from Perth diverted south to the Great Southern Railway (Beverley to Albany) or east to the Eastern Goldfields Railway (Northam to Kalgoorlie). Spencers Brook railway station originally opened in 1885 with the completion of the Perth line to York, with a spur line from Spencers Brook to Northam completed the following year in 1886. It was operating as a railway stopping place at 50 miles 44 chains (81.35 km) from Perth until 1966, incorporating a railway yard, refreshment tearooms and a watering tank tower.

With the 1966 official closing of the line from Spencers Brook through to Midland, a remnant of the railway nevertheless remained open until 1981 servicing iron ore trains via Northam and Spencers Brook to an iron and steel foundry located at Wundowie.

After 1981, all associated rail infrastructure was removed and nothing remains today of the Spencers Brook junction/station except for the former Stationmasters residence and remnant concrete foundations for the locomotive turntable. However, the Great Southern Railway does still arc through the Spencers Brook locality between the towns of Northam and York.

== Military History ==
During World War II Spencers Brook was the location of the Australian Army 7th Supply Depot (7SD), operated by 8 Supply Personnel Company, which stored material such as clothing, medical supplies and food etc. for storage and distribution. The depot was serviced by a spur line from the then Eastern Railway and remains of the depot can be seen on the right travelling toward the railway crossing on Spencers Brook Road from the Tavern.
