= 2021 Beechina bushfire =

Bushfire near Perth in 2021

- Date: 26 December – 27 December
- Location: Shire of Mundaring
- Coordinates: 31°49′48″S 116°19′33″E (approximate ignition point)

Statistics
- Burned area: 167 ha (410 acres)

Impacts
- Deaths: None
- Structures destroyed: One house; six outbuildings

Map
- Location within Perth

The 2021 Beechina bushfire was a bushfire that began on 26 December 2021 in Beechina, 46 kilometres (29 miles) east-north-east of the Perth central business district, in the Shire of Mundaring, Western Australia. The bushfire began less than five kilometres from the 2021 Wooroloo bushfire, and coincided with a COVID-19 outbreak and associated public health measures in the Perth metropolitan region. One house was destroyed as a result of the fire, along with six outbuildings and a number of vehicles.

== Background ==
In the preceding months, Perth and environs had recorded high levels of rainfall, leading to increased amounts of vegetation growth. In December 2021, especially towards the latter part of the month, high temperatures (in excess of 40 °C at certain points) and low rainfall led to dangerous conditions, conducive to large bushfires. Low dew points, low humidity and low soil moisture levels have recently made firefighting more difficult overnight – ordinarily, fires would reduce in size and ferocity overnight, however recently, this has not been the case due to the aforementioned factors.

Total fire bans were declared for a wide-ranging area on 26 December and the days before, including the area where the fire began.

== Timeline ==
=== 26 December ===
The fire began near the intersection of Old Northam Road and Government Road in Beechina, and was first reported at 3.41 pm. Weather conditions were harsh, with temperatures peaking at 43.5 °C during the day and wind gusts of up to 37 km/h recorded. By 6.07pm, the Department of Fire and Emergency Services (DFES) had issued an emergency warning to those in Wooroloo, Chidlow and Gidgegannup. Those in the emergency warning and watch and act zones were urged to evacuate – an area of approximately 2,479 hectares (6,130 acres). An evacuation centre was set up at the Mundaring Arena in Mundaring. By 7.17pm, in excess of 155 hectares (380 acres) had been burned, stretching in a westerly direction from the starting point of the fire. The fire was moving fast in that direction. 150 firefighters and aerial support were sent to the fire. The Shire of Mundaring Animal Pound was open and available to take domestic animals for residents who were evacuating the area, whilst the State Equestrian Centre was opened to accommodate animals from fire-affected areas.

The Bureau of Meteorology (BOM) forecast strong wind gusts of up to 60 kilometres per hour overnight, as well as temperatures of more than 28 °C. The Australian Broadcasting Corporation (ABC) reported that several structures had been burned.

By 9.06pm, DFES reported that more than 250 firefighters were attending the fire, as well as State Emergency Service (SES) and local government personnel. At this point, the bushfire was still moving fast in a westerly direction. DFES advised that residents of Warrigal Estate in Chidlow whom had not already evacuated that it was now too late to leave. The emergency warning zone encompassed the area bounded by Government Road, Old Northam Road, Lilydale Road and Needham Road, including Warrigal Estate in Wooroloo, Chidow and Gidgegannup. The watch and act zone encompassed the area bounded by Lilydale Road, Thomas Street, Elliott Road, Rosedale Road and Brompton Heights in Chidlow. The advice zone encompassed the area between Rosedale Road and Stoneville Road in Mount Helena, Stoneville, Gidgegannup and Chidlow. Aircraft in attendance included one heavy waterbomber and two medium waterbombers, which were dumping water and fire retardant in fire-affected areas. Two new DFES airtankers had also been deployed to the site.

By 11.20pm, DFES advised that 164.5 hectares (406 acres) had been burned.

=== 27 December ===
Overnight, the bushfire had been contained. The emergency warning update at 7.07am from DFES noted that the bushfire was stationary, and 100 firefighters were attending. The emergency warning zone had been decreased in size to 760 hectares (1,900 acres), at this point encompassing the area bounded by Government Road, Old Northam Road, Forge Farm Riding School, Liberton Road and Jason Street, including Warrigal Estate. The Warrigal Estate was reportedly under threat by fire at the present moment, as noted in the 7.07am emergency warning update. The watch and act zone encompassed the area aforementioned, as well as the balance of the former emergency warning zone. The advice zone remained mostly unchanged. In addition to the 100 firefighters reported by DFES to be attending, SES, WA Police, St John Ambulance, the Department of Biodiversity, Conservation and Attractions and the Shire of Mundaring were in attendance.

Wind gusts of up to 50 km/h were forecast for the morning by BOM, with high temperatures of 40 °C continuing.

By 8.02am, the emergency warning update from DFES advised that the bushfire was now contained and controlled, whilst the Warrigal Estate was still under threat by embers. Firefighters were reportedly patrolling the area and mopping up. Road closures at this point included Liberton Road between Stone Street and Needham Road, Needham Road between Liberton Road and Government Road, Lilydale Road between Breeze Road and Stone Street. Government Road between Needham Road and Old Northam Road had re-opened with significant amounts of water on the road.

DFES Incident Controller Adrian Hamill spoke to ABC Radio Perth, informing listeners that 167 hectares (410 acres) had now been burned, as well as one house, near to where the fire started, and several sheds. The Warrigal Estate was still under threat, however all houses in the estate appeared to have been saved.

By 11.12am, DFES issues an update to the emergency warning, which read that residences in Warrigal Estate, Forge Drive and Anvil Way may be under threat by embers. 120 firefighters were reported to be in attendance at this point. The watch and act zone and advice zones remained mostly unchanged.

By 11.45am, DFES issued another update to the emergency warning. A community meeting at the Wooroloo Hall was scheduled for 1.00pm, and a number of roads were re-opened, including Needham Road and Lilydale Road, in addition to Government Road, which was re-opened by 8.02 am. Liberton Road remained closed.

There were few changes with regards to the bushfire after 11.45am and before 2.00 pm. At 2.00pm, DFES downgraded the alert level from emergency to watch and act as the bushfire was contained and controlled. The Mundaring Arena evacuation centre had been closed. Firefighters were reported to be on the scene and monitoring the situation. Embers were still threatening homes, so residents were asked to remain vigilant.

News outlets reported that one house and six outbuildings (such as sheds) and a number of vehicles, including cars and trucks, had been burned. The destroyed house was owned by Monique Leahy, and has been owned by the same family for almost 40 years.

By 7.12pm, DFES had again downgraded the alert level for the former watch and act area from watch and act to advice, whilst the balance of the former warning area was downgraded to all clear. All roads had been re-opened at this point. The Water Corporation advised that some properties in Wooroloo, Gidgegannup and Chidlow were without water. Power had been restored to approximately 120 homes in the area earlier in the day by Western Power.

== Cause of the fire ==
The WA Police arson squad was reported to have visited the area on the night of 26 December and "determined an area of origin of about 100m area," DFES incident controller Adrian Hamil said, "but they do think it was suspicious." A police spokesperson also said that the arson squad was investigation, but that it was normal procedure and too early to confirm the cause of the fire.

WA Police Commissioner Chris Dawson said that the bushfire appeared to have three separate ignition points, and the cause was being treated as suspicious.

A man was arrested on 15 January 2022, and appeared in Perth Magistrate's Court on 16 January 2022, charged with various arson offences. Police alleged that he lit up to a further eight fires in the surrounding area.
