= El Caballo Blanco =

El Caballo Blanco may refer to:

- El Caballo Blanco, Sydney
- El Caballo Blanco, Wooroloo
- The White Horse (film) (Spanish: El caballo blanco), a 1962 Mexican film
