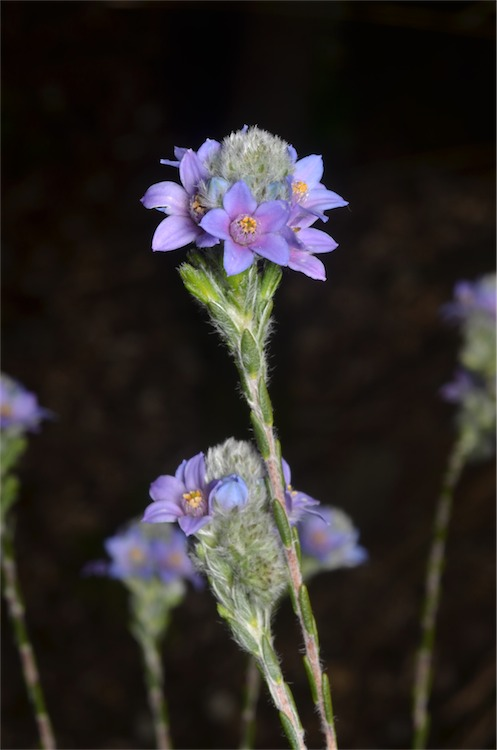
- Subspecies lasiocalyx

Scientific classification
- Kingdom: Plantae
- Clade: Embryophytes
- Clade: Tracheophytes
- Clade: Spermatophytes
- Clade: Angiosperms
- Clade: Eudicots
- Clade: Rosids
- Order: Sapindales
- Family: Rutaceae
- Genus: Philotheca
- Species: P. nodiflora

Binomial name
- Philotheca nodiflora (Lindl.) Paul G.Wilson

Synonyms
- Eriostemon nodiflorus Lindl.

= Philotheca nodiflora =

Species of plant

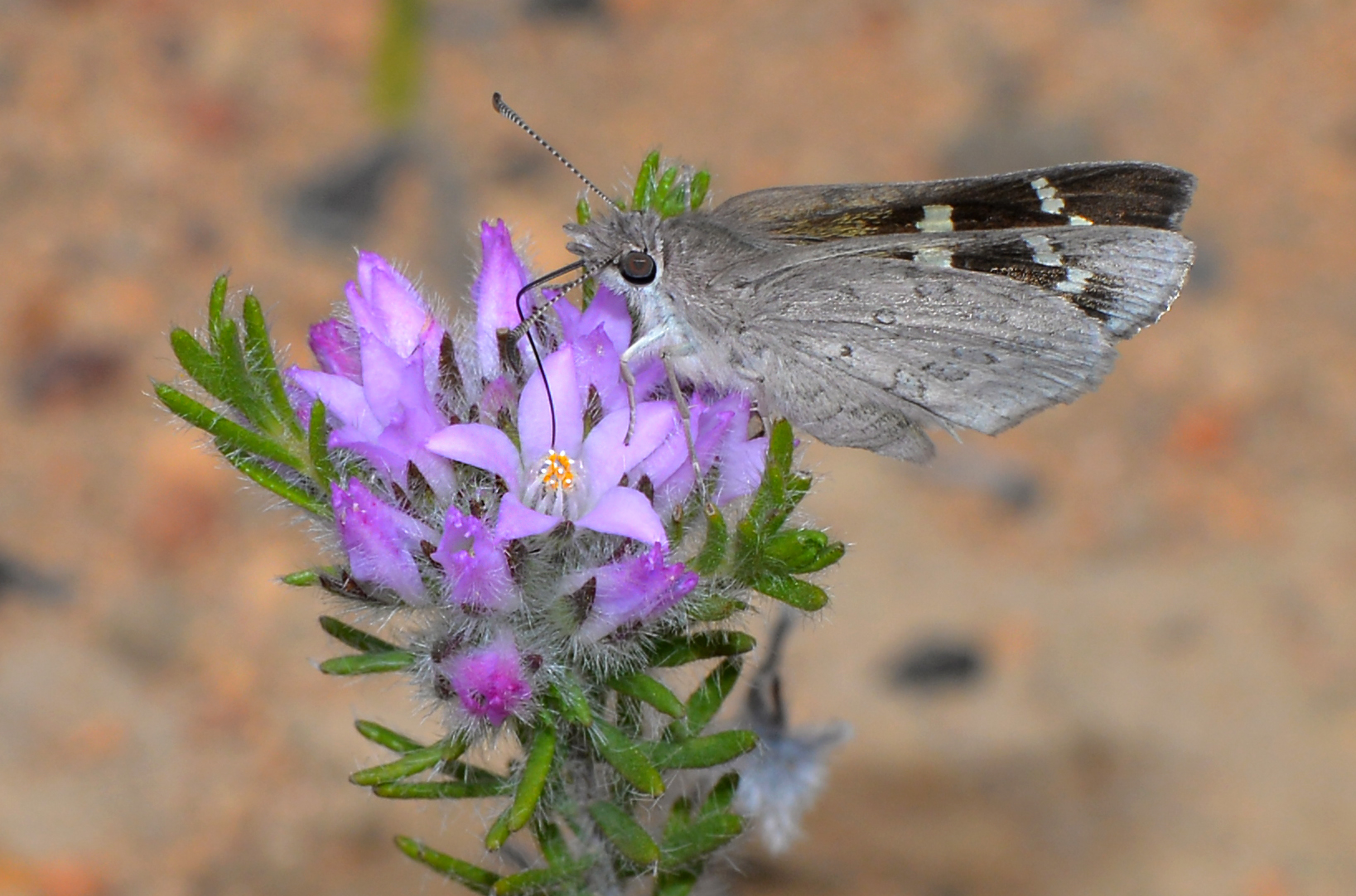
Subsp. lateriticola with butterfly Mesodina cyanophracta

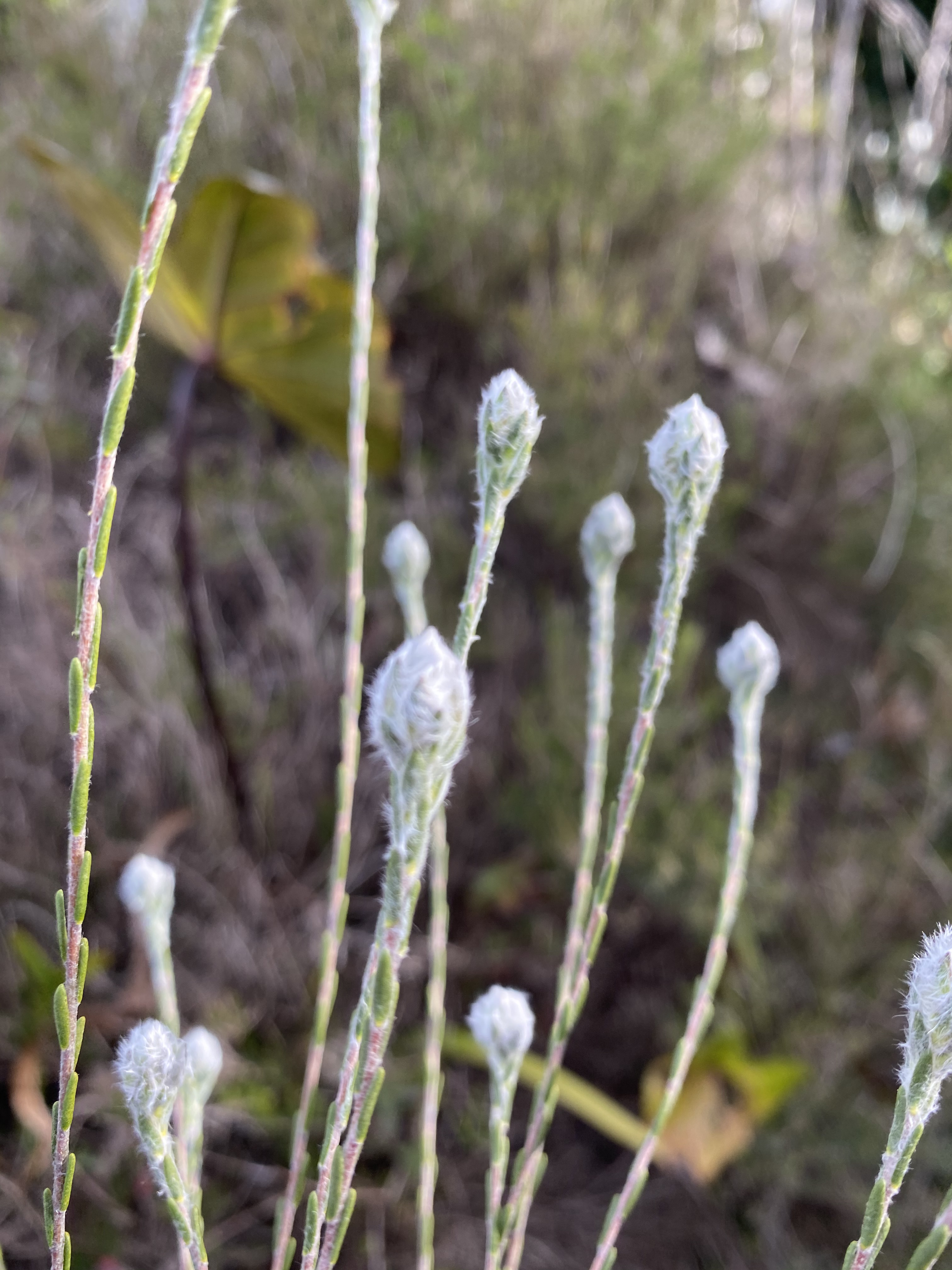
Subspecies lasiocalyx flower buds

Philotheca nodiflora is a species of flowering plant in the family Rutaceae and is endemic to Western Australia. It is a weak shrub with more or less cylindrical leaves and blue to pink flowers arranged in compact heads.

== Description ==
Philotheca nodiflora is a weak shrub that grows to a height of 10–80 cm (3.9–31.5 in). The leaves are more or less cylindrical, 5–15 mm (0.20–0.59 in) long, concave on the upper surface and rounded below. The flowers are borne compact heads 10–30 mm (0.39–1.18 in) in diameter on hairy pedicels 1–4 mm (0.039–0.157 in) long. The flowers have five linear to triangular sepals about 2–5 mm (0.079–0.197 in) long and five blue to pink, elliptic to egg-shaped petals 5–9 mm (0.20–0.35 in) long. The ten stamens are 4–5 mm (0.16–0.20 in) long and hairy.

== Taxonomy and naming ==
This species was first formally described in 1939 by John Lindley who gave it the name Eriostemon nodiflorus and published the description in A Sketch of the Vegetation of the Swan River Colony. In 1998 Paul G. Wilson changed the name to Philotheca nodiflora in the journal Nuytsia and described four subspecies:

- Philotheca nodiflora subsp. calycina (Turcz.) Paul G.Wilson has flower heads 20–30 mm (0.79–1.18 in) in diameter;
- Philotheca nodiflora subsp. lasiocalyx (Domin) Paul G.Wilson has flower heads 20–30 mm (0.79–1.18 in) in diameter and glabrous sepals;
- Philotheca nodiflora subsp. lateriticola Paul G.Wilson (originally named as subsp. latericola) has flower heads 20–30 mm (0.79–1.18 in) in diameter, sepals and the back of the petals covered with long, soft hairs;
- Philotheca nodiflora (Lindl.) Paul G.Wilson subsp. nodiflora has flower heads 20–30 mm (0.79–1.18 in) in diameter, sepals covered with long, soft hairs, and glabrous petals.

== Distribution and habitat ==
Philotheca nodiflora subsp. calycina grows in gravelly soil near Wooroloo and Wagin. Subspecies lasiocalyx grows in heath on sandy loam between Busselton, Collie and the western end of the Cape Arid National Park. Subspecies lateriticola grows on laterite and ironstone on the Darling Range between York and Bannister. Subspecies nodiflora grows along creeks and in winter-wet swamps between Chittering and Bindoon on the Darling Range.

== Conservation status ==
This species and each of the four subspecies are classified as "not threatened" by the Government of Western Australia Department of Parks and Wildlife.
