= 2021 Wooroloo bushfire =

Bushfires in Perth Hills, Western Australia February 2021

2021 Wooroloo bushfires
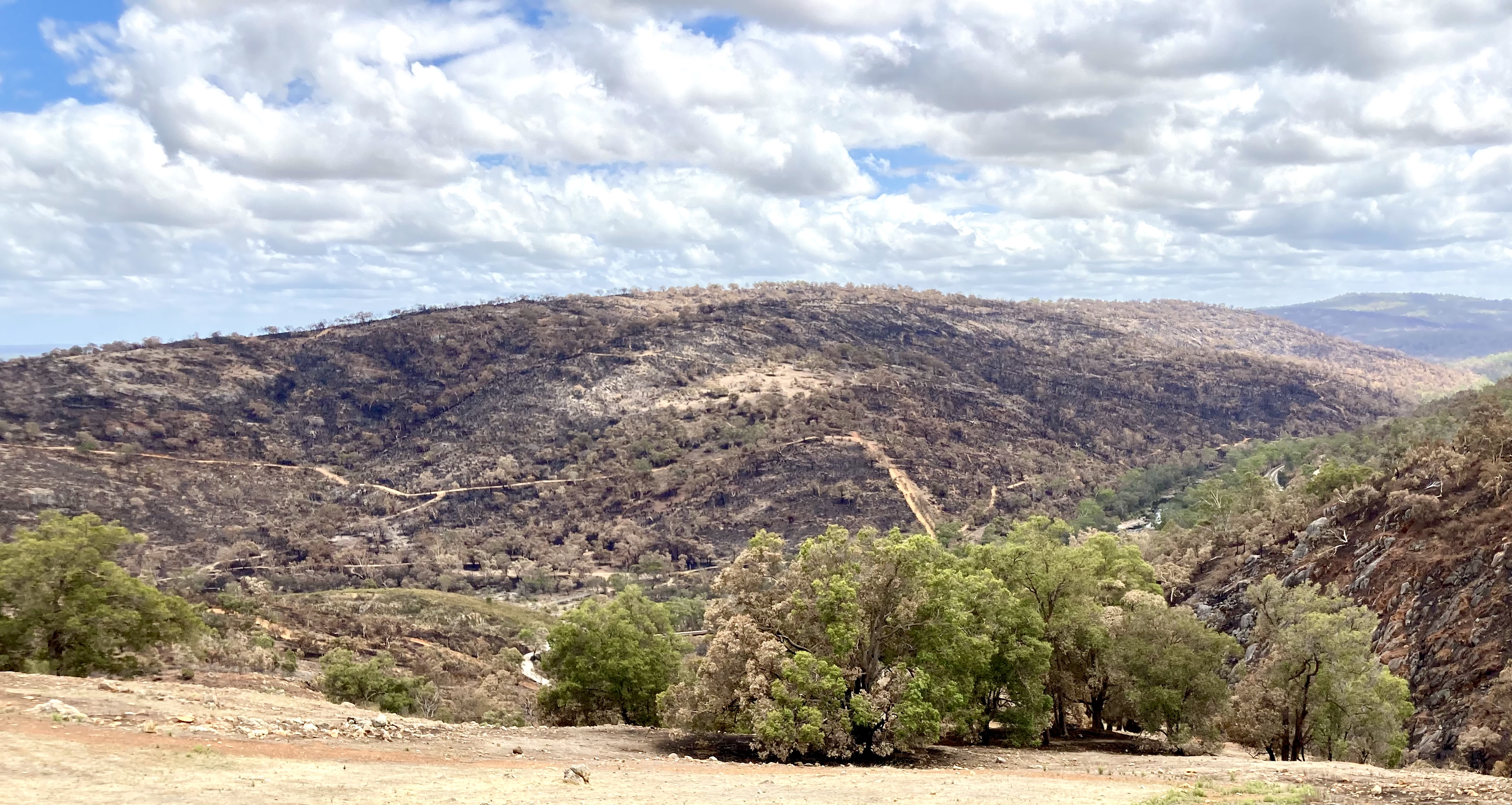
- Jumbuck Hill, February 2021
- Date: 1 February – 7 February
- Location: Shire of Mundaring; Shire of Chittering; Shire of Northam; City of Swan
- Coordinates: 31°47′21″S 116°19′48″E (approximate ignition point)

Statistics
- Burned area: 10,900 hectares (27,000 acres)

Impacts
- Injuries: 8
- Structures destroyed: 86

The 2021 Wooroloo bushfire was a fast moving bushfire that started on 1 February in Wooroloo, 45 kilometres (28 mi) north-east of the Perth central business district, in the Shire of Mundaring, Western Australia. By 2 February, the bushfire emergency had spread to Shires of Chittering and Northam, and the City of Swan. It had destroyed at least 86 houses and 2 fire trucks. By 6 February, the bushfire had travelled 26 km (16 mi) from its source. The fire coincided with a five day lockdown of the Perth metropolitan region that started at 6pm on 31 January, due to a case of COVID-19 outside of hotel quarantine. In July 2021, WA Police charged a man with a breach of duty and carrying out an activity that could cause a fire, alleging that he used an angle grinder that caused sparks.

== Background ==
In November 2020, most parts of Perth recorded record high rainfalls for November. Gidgegannup recorded 137.8 millimetres (5.43 in) of rainfall, beating the previous record of 85.0 millimetres (3.35 in) that was set in 1985. This caused large amounts of grass and plant growth. In December 2020 and January 2021 however, Perth recorded less than 5.0 millimetres (0.20 in) of rainfall, resulting in the grass and plants drying up.

== Timeline ==
=== 1 February ===
The fire started near Werribee Road, Wooroloo on Monday 1 February 2021, with the fire first reported at 12:02 pm. Weather conditions were harsh with the daytime temperature at 38 °C (100 °F) with strong winds. By 1 pm, an emergency warning had been issued to residents of Wooroloo, Bailup and Gidgegannup, who were urged to evacuate. An evacuation centre was opened at Brown Park Complex in Swan View. 500 firefighters and 95 vehicles were sent to fight the fire, along with aircraft water bombers. By 3:42 pm, 230 ha (570 acres) was reported burnt as the fire moved in a north-westerly direction.

The fire was moving rapidly through the day and jumped across Toodyay Road (10 km (6.2 mi) from the fire source), and the Walyunga National Park (28 km (17 mi) from the fire source) came under threat. Fire officials said firefighters were battling spot fires that were appearing around 500 metres (1,600 ft) in front of the fire. 120 local horses were relocated from the fire area to the State Equestrian Centre in the afternoon but had to be relocated to Middle Swan when the Equestrian Centre came under threat of the fire. By 6 pm, the first reports of destroyed houses were received and reported as seven. DFES reported at 11 pm that 4,146 ha (10,240 acres) of land had burnt and issued emergency warnings for Gidgegannup, Brigadoon, Upper Swan and Bullsbrook. Fire services recorded that one firefighter had received minor burns, one suffered smoke inhalation, and two fire trucks were destroyed by fire.

=== 2 February ===
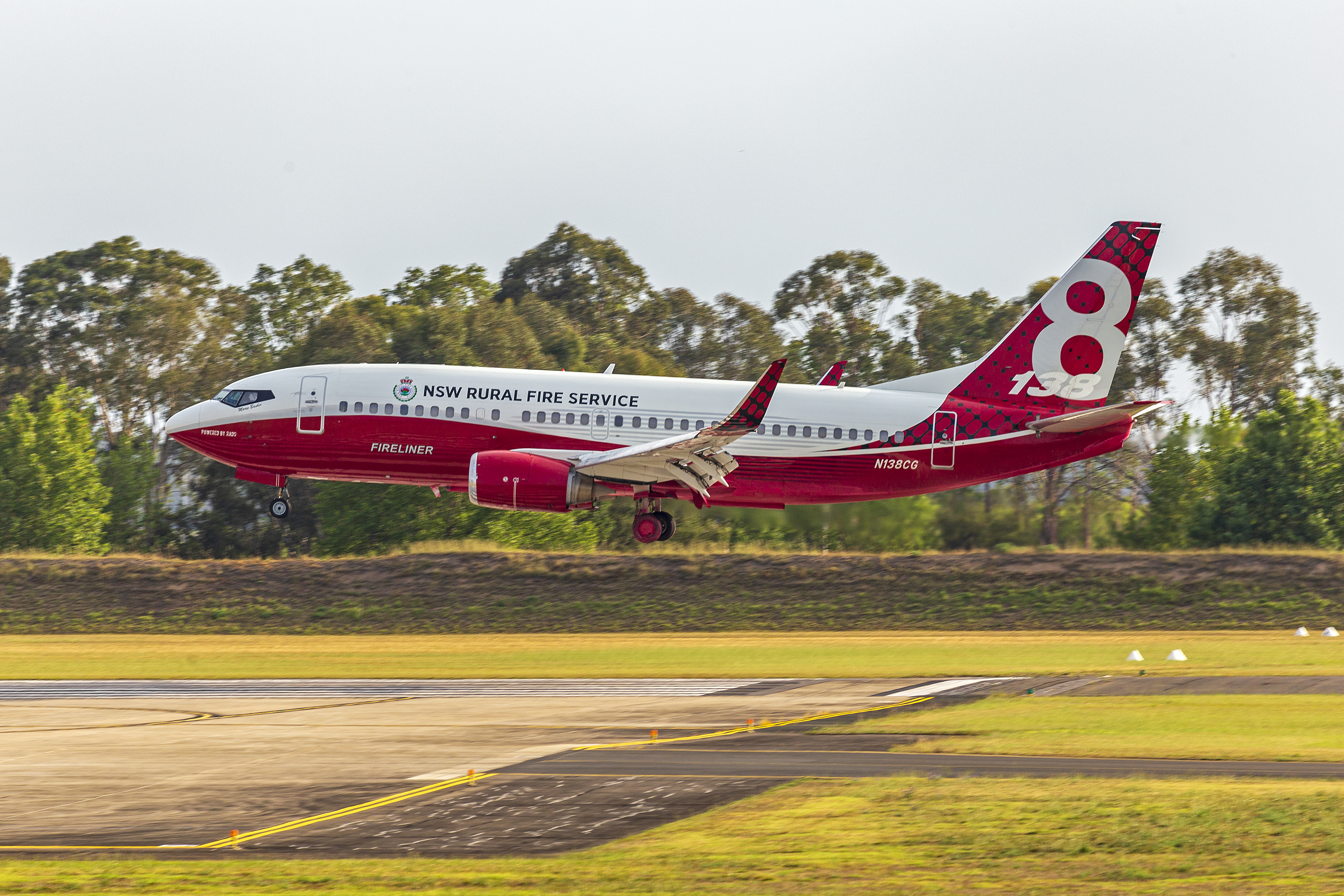
NSW Rural Fire Service Boeing 737 aerial tanker

The Department of Fire and Emergency Services (DFES) was advising that 80 per cent of properties in Tilden Park, Gidgegannup had been lost. Earlier in the day, 30 properties were reported lost with no loss of life. A large aerial tanker, the Marie Bashir, a 737 aircraft that can carry 15,000 litres (3,300 imp gal; 4,000 US gal) of water or fire retardant, was on route from the NSW Rural Fire Service and was due in Western Australia by 5pm. A smoke alert was issued by DFES that stretched from Joondalup in the northern suburbs to Fremantle in the south with ash falling in many non-fire suburbs including suburbs close to the central business district. The fire continued in a west-south-westerly direction. By 4pm, the fire had burnt through 7,300 ha (18,000 acres) with an 80 km (50 mi) perimeter.

By 6pm, the houses destroyed rose to 59 and over 8,000 ha (20,000 acres) destroyed. A DFES spokesperson said of the 59 homes lost, fifteen to twenty houses were lost on the eastern side of Toodyay Road. By the end of the afternoon, the winds were northerly and the firefighters were attempting to build firebreaks on the northern and southern flanks of the fire areas as the wind was expected to change to south-easterly over the next few days. Western Power had reported 2,700 properties without electricity due to the destruction of the power lines to those areas. 308 horses, evacuated from various areas in the fire zone the day before, were stabled at the Magic Millions complex. A total of six firefighters were reported to have sustained minor injuries.

=== 3 February ===
The morning briefing saw the fire commissioner Darren Klemm comment that the fire had not moved much overnight, but they were struggling with fire on the northwest front as the hilly terrain hindered the fire crews and equipment. Weather conditions continued to be hot and windy. Winds were south to southeasterly at 15 to 25 km/h (9.3 to 15.5 mph) in the late morning, changed to the south to southwesterly at 35 to 40 km/h (22 to 25 mph) in the afternoon before changing later to 25 to 40 km/h (16 to 25 mph) with gusts expected to be 70 km/h (43 mph) in the hills during the evening. The daytime temperature dropped to 34 °C (93 °F). Water bombers returned in the morning and were used to set up lines of retardant in the morning. It was confirmed that forty-three homes were lost in the estate of Tilden Park, while seventy-one were recorded as lost in total with over 9,000 ha (22,000 acres) of land burnt by the morning.

In the morning, residents of the Shady Hill estate, and the outskirts of east Bullsbrook, were urged to have their bushfire plans in place. But by midday, residents of those areas were asked to evacuate in a northerly direction when the wind changed. A total of 2,000 Shady Hills and East Bullsbrook residents were asked to evacuate. In the area northwest of Gidgegannup and east of Walyunga National Park, anyone remaining could no longer leave and were told to defend in place. The RAAF Base Pearce, northwest of the fire, though not under direct threat, became a watch and act zone. A spokesperson for the Australian Defence Force said the airbase at Pearce had been evacuated and that the only personnel remaining would be supporting the bushfire air support and all ordnance was safely stored and posed no risk. The base's runways were unusable to the fire bombers as work had been carried out on them. Sixty-nine suburbs of Perth were on alert with sixteen in immediate danger. At the end of the day, 10,000 ha (25,000 acres) had been burnt and 300 firefighter and 20 aircraft involved in the effort to slow the blaze with and a second large tanker was due from NSW. The evening and overnight saw 60 km/h (37 mph) winds that were causing spot fires 200m ahead of the main fire.

The WA Police arson squad announced they had established the origin of the fire near Werribee Road, Wooroloo and did not believe it was suspicious but were investigating further with DFES investigators. Police Commissioner Chris Dawson dismissed rumours that the fire had been started by fireworks or a meth lab. There were two reports of thefts at evacuated homes, one in Aveley and the other in Red Hill which the police commissioner regarded as burglary, not looting. The DFES Deputy Commissioner said that they were investigating whether it was feasible to bring fire crews in from interstate as some local fire crews had been working for three days. A second large air tanker, Bomber 137, was sent from RAAF Richmond to Busselton for operational use from 4 February.

WA Department of Communities opened two more evacuation centres, one at Swan Active in Midvale and another at Swan Active in Beechboro. 700 people had registered at the department's evacuation points, with 230 sleeping overnight. WA Department of Primary Industry and Regional Development provided twelve vets to take care of any injured animals brought into the fire control centre. Federal Minister for Emergency Management David Littleproud announced disaster relief payments for people who lost their homes, with Centrelink to provide $1,000 per adult and $400 per child from Thursday 4 February. He also announced that disaster victims could claim the Disaster Recovery Allowance that was available for up to thirteen weeks while Prime Minister Scott Morrison addressed parliament concerning the bushfires.

The bushfire has also disrupted rail traffic on this date from Northam, Kalgoorlie, and Merredin, with the AvonLink, Prospector, and MerredinLink services cancelled and replaced with coaches from those towns to Perth and surrounding suburbs. Normal travel was expected to return on 5 or 6 February.

=== 4 February ===
500 firefighters had worked through the night defending Avon Ridge Estate and Shady Hills with strong east-south-easterly winds. They had been assisted by fire retardant that was laid late Wednesday by the large fire bombers. The bombers had dropped eleven loads of retardant, 200,000 litres (44,000 imp gal; 53,000 US gal) in total, the day before. Two firefighting vehicles had been confirmed as lost over the last three days. It was confirmed that properties destroyed in Tilden Park had risen to fifty-six properties when the fire passed through on Tuesday 2 February. Temperatures cooled to 28 °C (82 °F) with stable winds east to south-easterly in the fire area, but gusts were expected up to 70 km/h (43 mph) in the evening.

It was confirmed that 10,400 ha (26,000 acres) of land was burnt and the perimeter of the fire was 136 km (85 mi). The Shady Hills estate had been protected overnight but south-easterly winds in the afternoon could threaten the estate again. Shady Hills estate, east of Bullsbrook and parts of Gidgegannup were again advised it was too dangerous to leave and if they remained should shelter in place.

By the afternoon the main fire was being tackled by 500 full-time firefighters and volunteers, with the fire bombers laying fire retardant and the fire moving in a north-westerly direction. A new fire began in the afternoon, a few kilometres from Bullsbrook, 10 km (6.2 mi) north of the original fire at the intersection of Wilson and Chittering roads and firefighters and aerial tankers were fighting the fire and was brought under control. It was confirmed by fire authorities that the Wooroloo bushfire had now claimed eighty-one homes.

The WA Premier announced emergency state funding, $4,000 for those who had lost homes and $2,000 for those with damaged homes. Western Power had begun to replace power poles in some areas damaged by the fire. 800 homes remained without power down from 2,000 reported. WA Police Commissioner Chris Dawson announced there were no reports of further burglaries or looting. The Australian Red Cross said numbers continued to drop at the evacuation centres as evacuees found other accommodation.

Firefighters were monitoring weather conditions for the weekend as rain was forecasted by the Bureau of Meteorology for Saturday and Sunday and this could bring some relief.

=== 5 February ===
The emergency warning area was reduced overnight, with the areas under threat reduced to ten locations and included parts of Avon Valley National Park, Belhus, Brigadoon, Bullsbrook, Ellenbrook, Gidgegannup, The Vines, Upper Swan and Walyunga National Park in the City of Swan. On the western flanks Shady Hills and Walyunga, the Avon Ridge were still been watched for breakouts.

The number of homes lost increased to 86. Firefighters said they had saved 200 homes inside the fire area. No further homes were lost overnight as the 200 firefighters battled the bushfire on its northern front with strong east-south-easterly winds and gusts of up to 80 km/h (50 mph). The bushfire had burnt up to 11,000 ha (27,000 acres) of land and the perimeter was around 122 km (76 mi). Residents were allowed to return to their properties in areas east of Toodyay Road while others were expected to be allowed on 6 February in other areas. Those west of Toodyay Road and Tilden Park Estate were escorted in buses to view their properties. Assessors started to walk 240 km (150 mi) of roads and tracks to access the burnt trees at the roadsides to see what dangers needed to be addressed to allow them to be opened to ordinary traffic. By early evening the fire was still uncontained around the intersections of Clenton Road, O'Brien Road and Ewing Road, Gidgegannup.

Yesterday's separate fire, 10 km (6.2 mi) north of the main Wooroloo bushfire, close to Bullsbrook, had been contained by ten firetrucks and controlled by Thursday evening, and was being treated as a suspicious fire. By Friday, the fire had been declared not suspicious. 25 ha (62 acres) were burnt in this fire.

Police arson investigators and Western Power continued to search the property at the source of the fire. They focused on the power lines, domestic power lines and service pits. They still do not believe the bushfire was caused by a crime. The house and shed on the property did not burn when the fire started.

Western Power restored power to more homes leaving 480 properties without power. Repairs and restoration of the network were to take weeks to complete. Power poles and other materials were accumulated close to the bushfire site. Construction teams were to begin on Saturday 6 and Sunday 7 February, with the work expected to take weeks.

=== 6 February ===
DFES Commissioner Darren Klemm announced that the firefighters had contained the bushfire and that they were downgrading it to an advice level only. The advice alert remained in place for people in the Avon Valley National Park, Brigadoon, Bullsbrook, Gidgegannup, Upper Swan and Walyunga National Park in the City of Swan. Light rain began during the day as a low moved south down the coast of Western Australia with winds of 50-60 km/h was forecast into the evening, with between 20 and 40mm expected over the fire site on Saturday and Sunday.

Forty-eight-hour permits were issued to locals of the Tilden Park Estate, allowing them to visit the remains of their houses. Roads were reopened in the areas of Brigadoon, Meadowbrook Ramble, Bullsbrook and Shady Hills with no permits required. Other major roads opened including the Great Northern Highway and Chittering Road between the Great Northern Highway and Wilson Road. By the evening DFES had reduced the firefighter to 150 firefighters to mop up and maintain containment lines.

Veterinarians established an animal clinic at the Mundaring Arena to treat wildlife burnt in the fire with volunteers from Express Wildlife Rescue and West Coast Vets.

=== 7 February ===
Rain on Saturday night and Sunday saw 15 mm (0.59 in) fall on the fire site at Gidgegannup.

=== 8 February ===
Fire Commissioner Klemm said, even though contained and controlled, continued to monitor the bushfire area as temperatures were expected to rise in the forthcoming week.

== Cause of the fire ==
A man had been interviewed days after the fire had started. On 16 July, he was arrested and charged with one count of breach of duty and one of carrying out an activity in the open air the causes or could cause a fire. Since the fire, DFES and WA Police arson investigators had conducted an investigation into the source of the fire. It was alleged that the man concerned had used an angle grinder to remove a padlock on a shipping container which ignited the fire.

== Impact of COVID-19 ==
Starting at 6pm on 31 January 2021, the Perth metropolitan, Peel and South West regions went into a five day lockdown as a result of a hotel quarantine security guard testing positive to the British variant of COVID-19. The rules meant the only four reasons for people to leave their home were to go to work if it couldn't be done at home, exercise, but for only one hour per day and within 5 kilometres (3.1 mi) of home, shopping for essential items such as food and medicine, and for medical care. Visiting other people was not allowed, and masks had to be worn in public.

During the evacuation of residences near the fire, there was confusion about whether people could go to family and friend's houses or not due to the lockdown restrictions. The police commissioner, Chris Dawson, stated "If you are under threat, leave your property. Do not stay in the property if you think you have to obey the COVID-19 rules." Premier Mark McGowan stated "Right now, WA is battling two different kinds of emergencies – a dangerous fire emergency and a COVID-19 lockdown emergency."

Firefighters followed COVID-19 Safe Operations Guidelines, prepared by DFES to manage the risk of responding to an emergency during an outbreak. The Guidelines recommend crews limit sharing of personnel across vehicles or teams but there was no limit to the number of firefighters in each vehicle (as initially stated). Each firefighter had to wear a mask and maintain physical distancing where possible.

== Disaster fundraising ==
The Lord Mayor's Distress Relief Fund had been reopened with the State Premier Mark McGowan contributing $2 million with another half million dollars contributed by the fund itself by the afternoon of 3 February.

Rio Tinto CEO Ivan Vella announced that his organisation was donating $2 million to aid recovery initiatives. Of that sum, $500,000 had been donated by Minara Resources, Mt Gibson Iron Ore and Newmont. HIF has pledged $25,000 while the WA Chamber of Minerals and Energy CEO Paul Everingham said they were prepared to commit $2.5 million.

By Thursday 4 February, Chevron had joined Rio Tinto contribution to the Lord Mayor's Distress Relief Fund, with the former contributing $1.2 million. Coles contributed $100,000 and the ability of its customers to contribute further. Andrew Forrest's Minderoo Foundation had partnered with the Salvation Army to provide emergency shelters and food, as well as a means of making financial donations. Crown Perth had offered a 100 free rooms to employees affected by the bushfire.

By Friday 5 February, The Lord Mayor's Distress Relief Fund had raised more than $6.1 million. On Monday 8 February, Lord Mayor Basil Zempilas announced that $7.2 million had been raised by fund. By 12 February, the fund had reached $12.3 million. The final amount raised for The Lord Mayor's Distress Relief Fund was $16.7 million. The Commonwealth-State Disaster Recovery Funding Arrangements (DRFA) allocated $18.1 million for clean-up community recovery and outreach programs and recreational asset recovery.

== Insurance claims ==
Early insurance estimates put the cost of bushfire at more than $40 million. Claims included vehicles, fencing, stables, sheds, water tanks and at least eighty-one homes. They major WA insurers RAC and HBF have started to receive claims as of 4 February, with the former receiving four home claims and thirteen cars while the latter, three home claims. Both expected to receive more claims, while there was speculation that many were underinsured or had none. The Insurance Council of Australia said insurers had received more than 270 claims. In July, the Insurance Council of Australia said the cost of the fire was now $91 million, with 1,000 claims made to insurers and 600 settled.

== Inquiry ==
On 13 August 2021, the state government launched an inquiry into the bushfire, led by the Australasian Fire and Emergency Services Authorities Council. Submissions will be open from 20 August 2021, and close on 24 September 2021. Emergency Services Minister Reece Whitby said "the inquiry will examine the circumstances surrounding the Wooroloo Bushfire and the response to it", and "in any major emergency there are lessons to be learned. The State Government is committed to learning as much as possible about the Wooroloo Bushfire to see if any improvements can be made in the future."

== See also ==
- 2021 Beechina bushfire – a bushfire that occurred nearby in the same year
