= HIF =

HIF may refer to:

== Sports clubs ==
- Habo IF, in Sweden
- Hammarby IF, in Stockholm, Sweden
- Hässleholms IF, in Sweden
- Helsingborgs IF, in Sweden
- Hemmingsmarks IF, in Sweden
- Hörvikens IF, in Sölvesborg, Sweden
- Hvidovre IF, in Denmark

== Other uses ==
- Fiji Hindi (ISO 693-3 language code)
- Finnmark University College (Norwegian: Høgskolen i Finnmark, HiF), now part of the University of Tromsø
- Harrogate International Festivals
- Health Impact Fund, a proposal of incentives for global health
- Health Insurance Fund, an Australian insurer
- Hill Air Force Base, in Utah, United States
- Horizontal Integration Facility
- Hypoxia-inducible factor
- USGS Hydrologic Instrumentation Facility, of the United States Geological Survey
