= El Caballo Blanco, Sydney =

Australian theme park

El Caballo Blanco (The White Horse)
- Interactive map of El Caballo Blanco (The White Horse)
- Location: Catherine Field, Sydney, Australia
- Coordinates: 34°00′35″S 150°46′31″E
- Opened: 1972
- Closed: 2007
- Theme: Horses

El Caballo Blanco (Spanish for The White Horse) is the name for equine Andalusian theme parks that operated in the south-western Sydney suburb of Catherine Field between 1972 and 2007; and in the north-eastern Perth suburb of Wooroloo in Western Australia since 1974.

The first Spanish horses arrived in Australia in 1972 and were brought to the El Caballo complex at Wooroloo, by the Western Australian business entrepreneur, Ray Williams. Williams imported the well known stallion Bodeguero and a number of mares, as the foundation of the Bodeguero Stud. Many of the present day Andalusian horses in Australia trace back to Bodeguero and those first mares. El Caballo Resort was established in 1974 at Wooroloo and their dancing horses were a popular tourist attraction.

== Theme parks ==
Williams established the El Caballo Blanco theme park at Catherine Field near the Sydney suburb of Narellan. Its main attraction was its Andalusian dancing stallions, but the park also featured miniature Fallabella horses, and a number of non-equestrian related amusements such as water slides, train rides, and a small wildlife zoo.

Williams then went on to establish an El Caballo Blanco park at Disneyland in the US. After Williams' death in the US, the operations of the various El Caballo Blanco theme parks gradually wound down and ceased. For many years after the closure of the Catherine Field complex, it was used for storing items such as carpets, until a fire engulfed much of the building housing the main show arena. The Andalusian horses remained on the site, cared for by a group of horse enthusiasts.

After quite some years, the Wooroloo complex in Western Australia once again hosting the famed Spanish dancing horse show.

In June 2007 a new (independent) El Caballo Blanco show paying tribute to the Spanish dancing horses re-opened playing regular shows at Horseworld Stadium, located at Maraylya in Sydney's north-west. This new show was put together by Rene Gasser. In September 2007, equine influenza impacted Gasser's El Caballo Blanco show. Three horses showed clinical signs of the disease resulting in the suspension of his shows.

In 2015, demolition of the remaining buildings and attractions at the Sydney site commenced to make way for a residential development. The Wooroloo site was sold in May 2020 to the Aboriginal Housing Foundation for redevelopment.
