= The Lakes, Western Australia =

The Lakes
- Suburb
- Interactive map of The Lakes
- Coordinates: 31.876°S 116.321°E
- Country: Australia
- State: Western Australia
- City: Perth
- LGA: Shire of Mundaring
- Location: 51 km (32 mi) E of the Perth CBD; 43.4 km (27.0 mi) W of York; 52.6 km (32.7 mi) SW of Northam

Government
  - State electorate: Swan Hills
  - Federal division: Hasluck

Population
  - Total: 20 (SAL 2021)
- Postcode: 6556
Suburbs around The Lakes
Beechina	Wooroloo
Chidlow	The Lakes
Gorrie

The Lakes is an outer northeastern locality of Perth, the capital city of Western Australia, located within the Shire of Mundaring. It is located 51 kilometres (32 mi) east of the Perth CBD, at the junction of the Great Eastern Highway and the Great Southern Highway, and is the easternmost suburb within the Metropolitan Region Scheme. At the 2021 census, The Lakes had a population of 20.

The main features of the community include a roadhouse and a service station at the junction between the highways. It borders on the western ward of the Shire of Northam and the community of Woottating.

It is also the locality in which BGC have quarrying operations. BGC trucks carting material from the quarry use as their main route the Great Eastern Highway to various locations in the Perth metropolitan area, including the brick manufacturing location close to Perth Airport.

From the junction it is possible to travel to Northam on the northern fork, or York on the southern fork.
