= Chidlow Tavern =

Historic hotel in Chidlow, Western Australia

The Chidlow Tavern
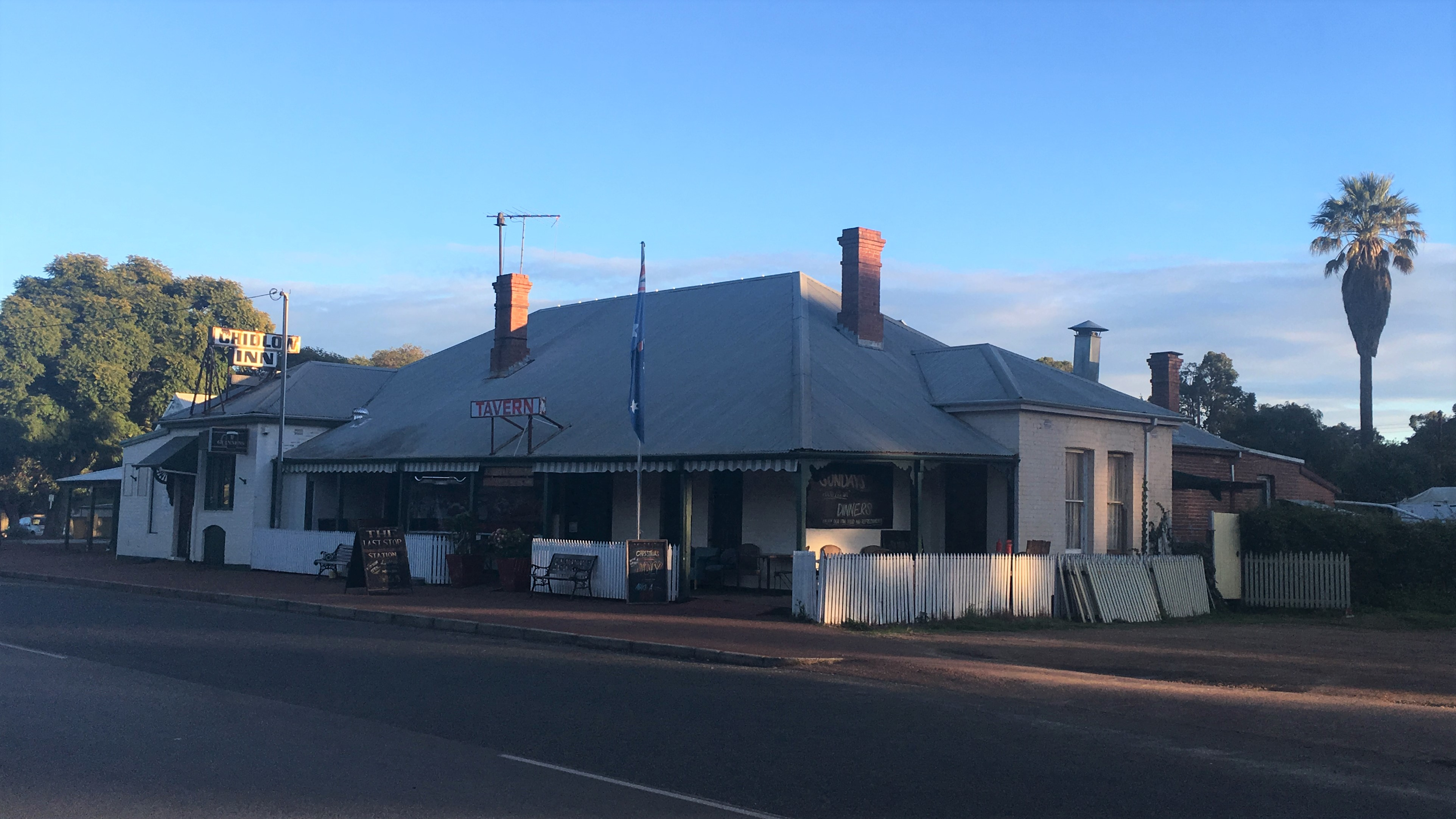
- Interactive map of the The Chidlow Tavern area
- Former names: The Oxford Inn; The Chidlow Inn Tavern

General information
- Status: Trading
- Type: Hotel
- Location: 4 Thomas Street, Chidlow, Australia
- Coordinates: 31.8622°S 116.2679°E
- Opened: 1884

Website
- http://www.chidlowtavern.com.au/

The Chidlow Tavern was opened in 1884 in Chidlow a hills suburb of Perth, Western Australia. It was originally called The Oxford Inn before assuming its current name in 1973.

== History ==
John Symonds opened The Oxford Inn in 1884, on leased railway land, shortly after the establishment of the railway connection from Guildford to Chidlow’s Well. Symonds transferred the name, The Oxford Inn, from his previous Mahogany Creek hotel to the new hotel. John Symmons was well regarded and considered a popular and genial host.

At the time, Chidlow’s Well had many railway buildings, including refreshment rooms, a marshalling yard and a turntable for turning the engines back to Perth. The Inn was open 24 hours a day, providing refreshments, a place for people to stay, horses to be stabled and a meeting point for locals.

The first Inn burnt down in March 1908, although fortunately the owner, William Bramwell, managed to save all the furniture. He subsequently built an 8-bedroom brick hotel directly opposite the railway land, at the current site in Thomas Street. Both hotels were called the Oxford Inn.

From its establishment, and after its rebuild, The Oxford Inn was the social hub of the town hosting cycling groups as early as 1888, as well as agricultural shows, sporting meetings, dances and residents meetings. The Tavern has also served as a poling station during elections.

Chidlow’s Well was renamed Chidlow in 1920 and the railway track was removed in 1966.

In 1973 the hotel became known as The Chidlow Inn Tavern and in 1984 simply The Chidlow Tavern. Despite internal changes to the tavern to add a large bar and eating area, the tavern has retained much of its charm.

== Architectural character ==
The Chidlow Tavern sits right on the footpath in Thomas Street Chidlow, opposite the Railway Reserve Heritage Trail where Chidlow's Wells Station once stood. The building is single-storey brick, with simple timber detailing to the front veranda, doors and windows. The roof is of corrugated iron with a hipped form that continues down to form the veranda without any break in pitch. Projecting rooms to the front and side also have hipped roofs extending out from the main roof structure. The main entry into the hotel is from a door on the veranda with stained glass panels and sidelights.

== Heritage value ==
The Chidlow Tavern serves as a reminder of the importance of the town in the development of the Eastern Railway and primary industry of the surrounding district and continues its role as a social hub for the district.

In 2016 the Chidlow Tavern was listed on Western Australia’s Heritage Register for the contribution made by the place to Western Australia’s cultural heritage.
