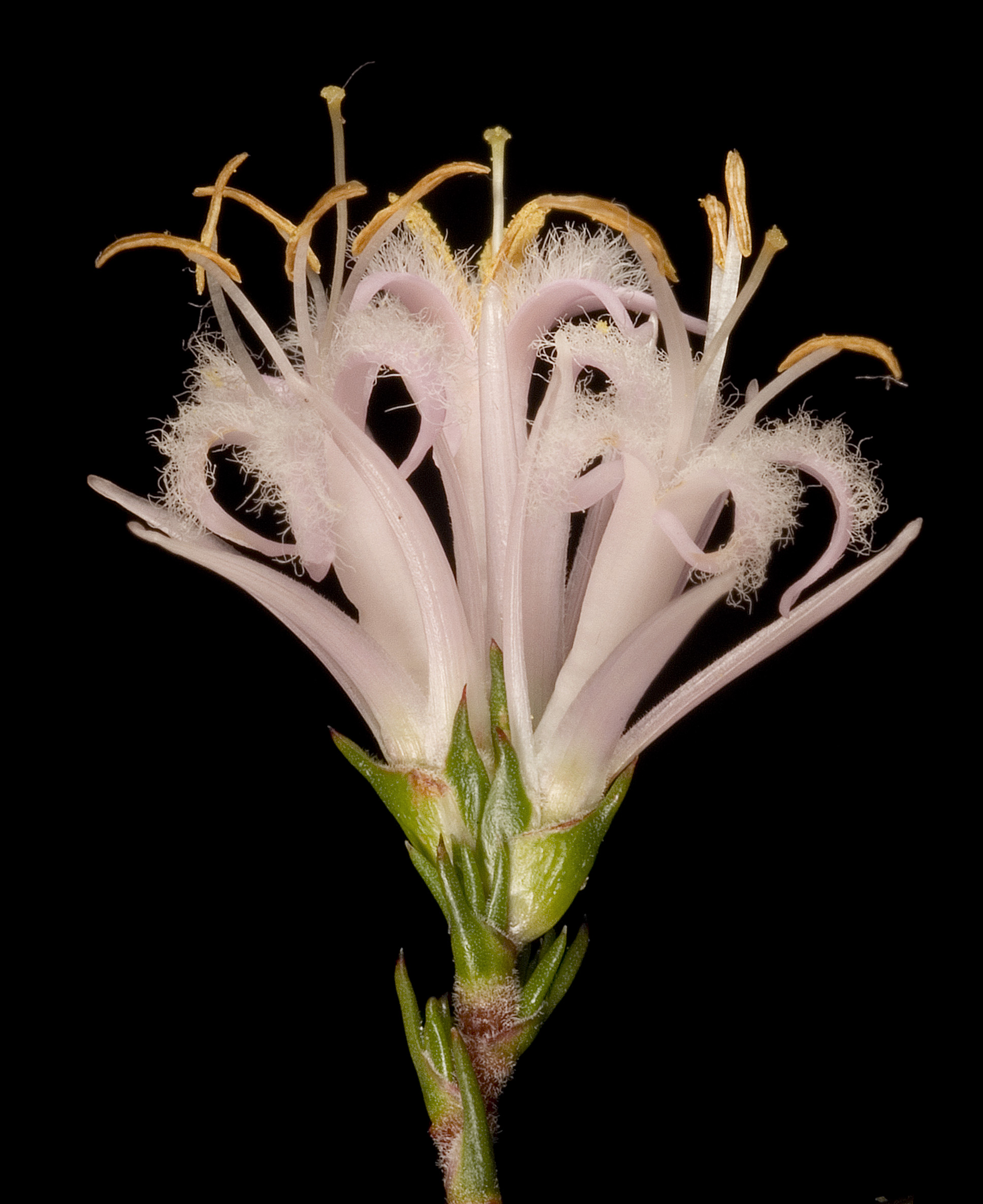

Scientific classification
- Kingdom: Plantae
- Clade: Embryophytes
- Clade: Tracheophytes
- Clade: Angiosperms
- Clade: Eudicots
- Clade: Asterids
- Order: Ericales
- Family: Ericaceae
- Genus: Andersonia
- Species: A. aristata

Binomial name
- Andersonia aristata Lindl.

Synonyms
- Atherocephala drummondi DC. orth. var.; Atherocephala drummondii DC.; Sprengelia aristata (Lindl.) F.Muell.

= Andersonia aristata =

Rice flower

Species of flowering plant

Andersonia aristata, commonly known as rice flower, is a species of flowering plant in the family Ericaceae and is endemic to the southwest of Western Australia. It is a slender, erect or spreading shrub with linear to lance-shaped leaves and white, tube-shaped flowers with bearded petal lobes.

== Description ==
Andersonia aristata is a slender, erect or spreading shrub that typically grows to a height of 8–50 cm (3.1–19.7 in). Its leaves are linear to lance-shaped, mostly 1–5 mm (0.039–0.197 in) long and 0.5–1.5 mm (0.020–0.059 in) wide. The flowers are arranged in clusters of mostly 2 to 10 with bracts up to 2 mm (0.079 in) wide and shorter bracteoles. The sepals are linear to lance-shaped, 8.0–12.0 mm (0.31–0.47 in) long, the petals tube-shaped and white with lobes about as long as the tube, and densely bearded. The stamens are 5–8 mm (0.20–0.31 in) long and slightly longer than the petal tube, later 10–14 mm (0.39–0.55 in) long.

== Taxonomy ==
Andersonia aristata was first formally described in 1839 by John Lindley in A Sketch of the Vegetation of the Swan River Colony The specific epithet (aristata) mean 'awned', referring to the leaves.

== Distribution and habitat ==
Rice flower grows on rocky outcrops, rocky hills and in winter-wet areas from near Perth to Bunbury, near Busselton and Cape Leeuwin in the Avon Wheatbelt, Jarrah Forest and Swan Coastal Plain of south-western Western Australia.

== Conservation status ==
Andersonia aristata is listed as not threatened flora by the Government of Western Australia.

Andersonia aristata

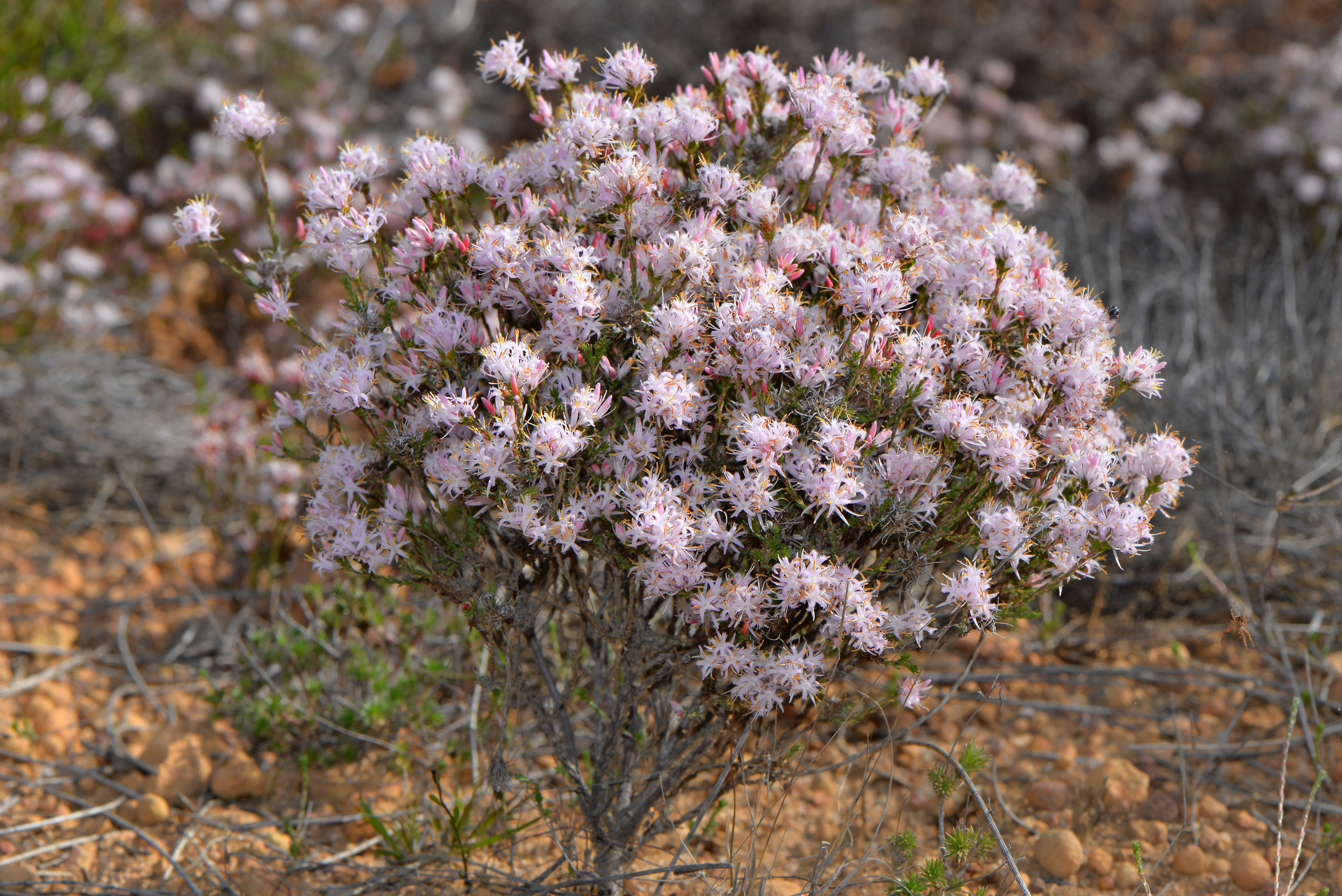
Habit

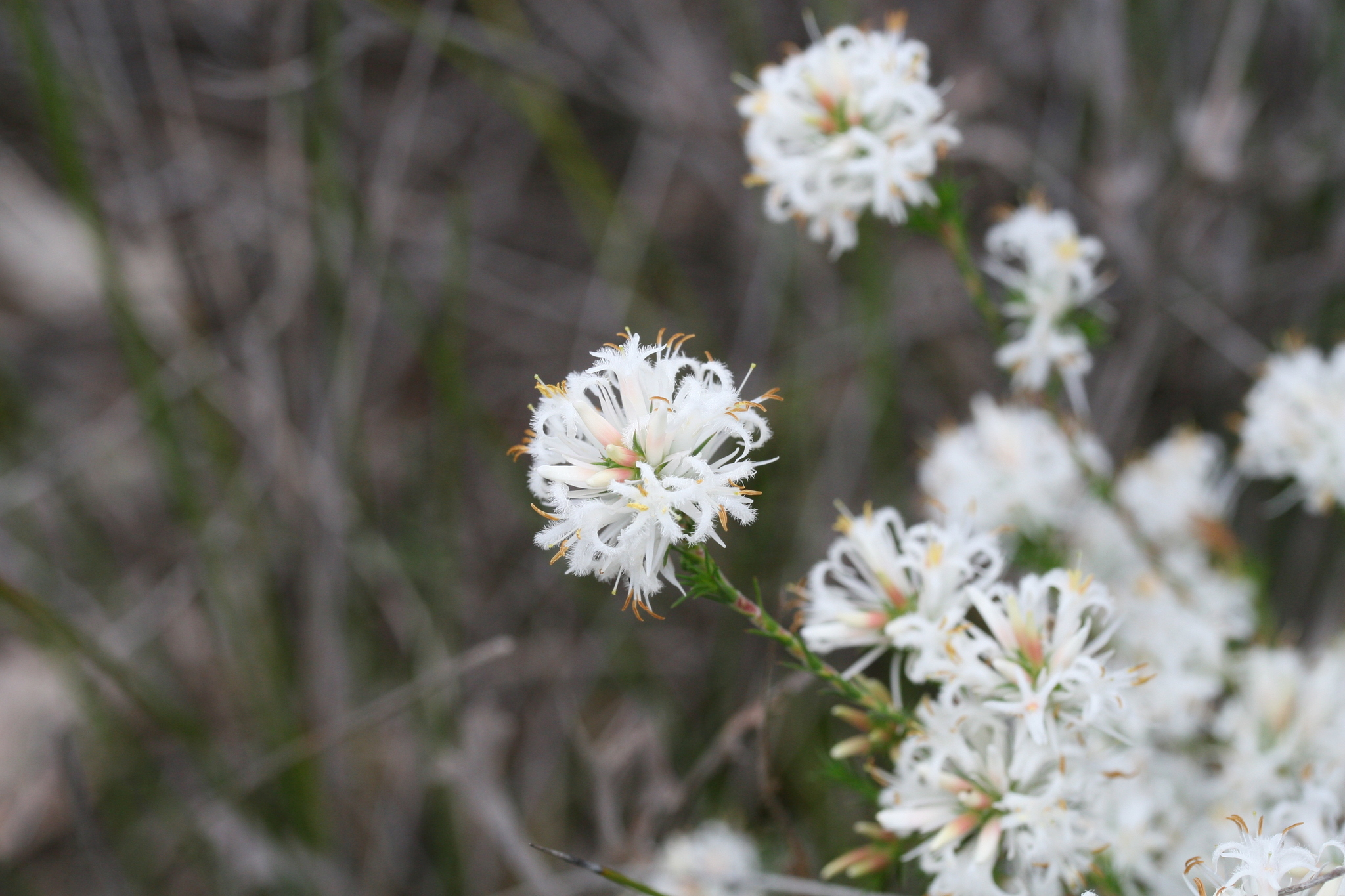

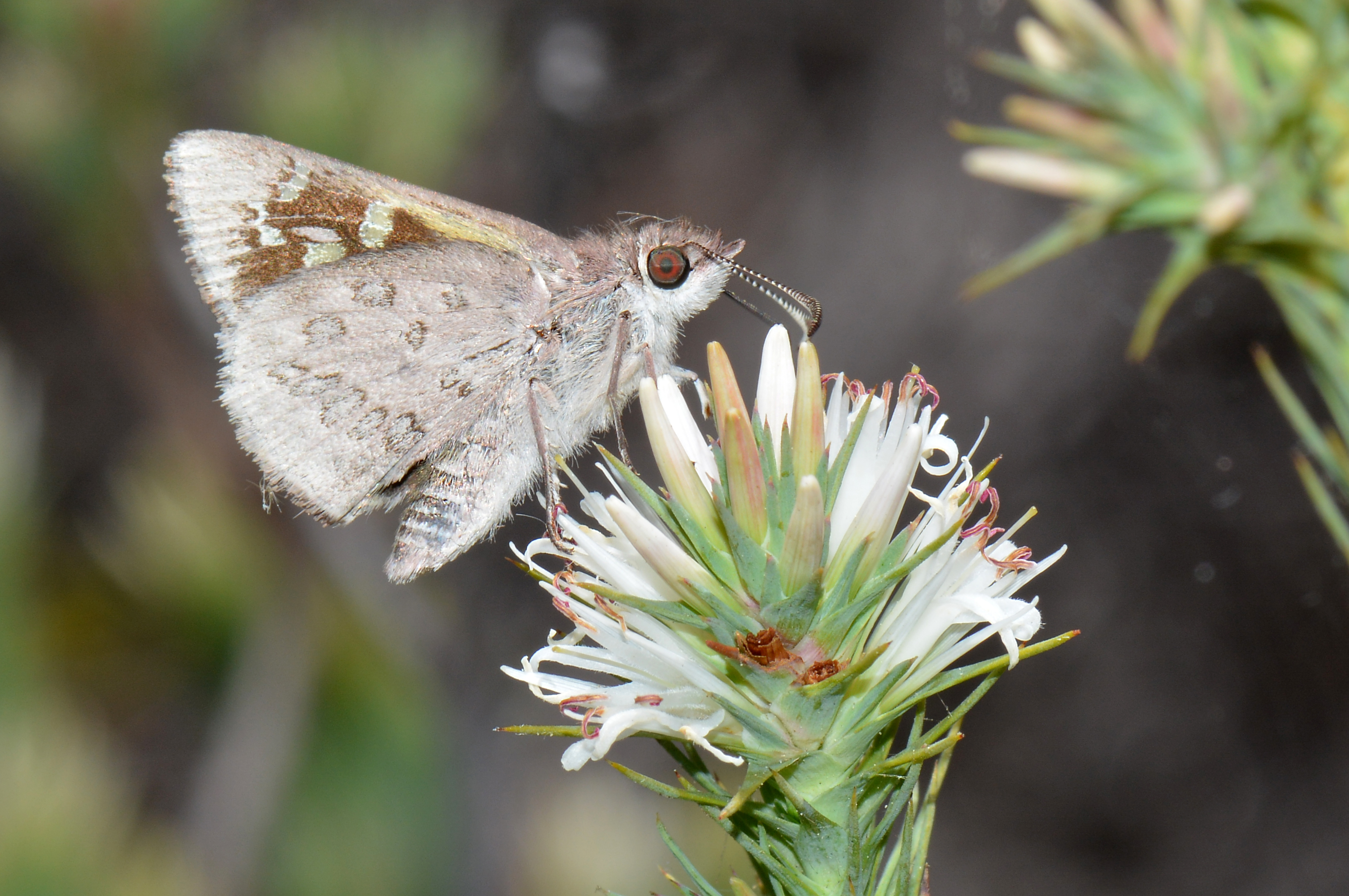
With Blue iris-skipper butterfly (Mesodina cyanophracta)
