= Wooroloo Prison Farm =

Prison in Western Australia

- Location in Western Australia
- Location: Wooroloo, Western Australia; 31.8134°S 116.3385°E
- Status: Operational
- Security class: Minimum (Male)
- Capacity: 360
- Opened: 1972
- Managed by: Department of Justice, Western Australia

Wooroloo Prison Farm is an Australian minimum-security prison located in Wooroloo, Western Australia. It was established in 1972 under an arrangement that it would offer some of its amenities to the community of Wooroloo. It was previously the site of a sanatorium.

== History ==
The Wooroloo Sanatorium was officially opened on 1 May 1915, designed by two Western Australian Principal Architects, Hillson Beasley and William Hardwick

The complex operated as a tuberculosis sanatorium until 1959. From 1960 to 1970, the former sanatorium operated as a geriatric and district hospital. Since 1970, the former sick staff ward has remained in use as the Wooroloo hospital. Since 1970, the site has operated as a minimum-security prison for short-term offenders.

Approved prisoners can work under supervision in the local community and are involved in reforestation and environmental programs, training at local businesses and general community projects.

The prison's large industries complex produces goods for the prison system and for external contracts including prison food, offsetting some of the costs of prisoner management.

Prisoners are taught workshop skills and can take part in traineeships to help them find a job when they are released from prison.
