= Mundaring Cemetery =

Cemetery in Mundaring, Western Australia

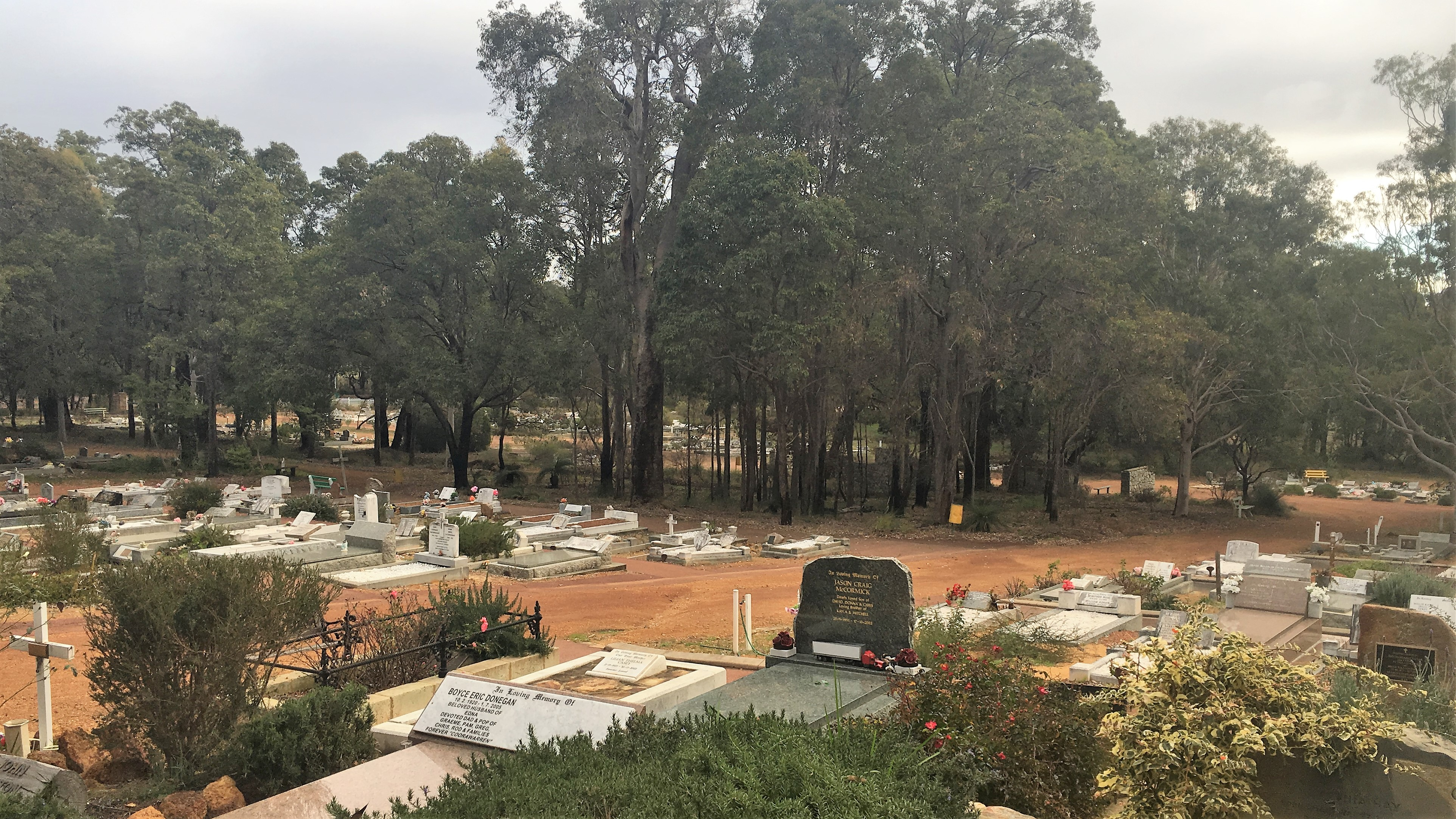
- Mundaring Cemetery

Details
- Location: Mundaring, Western Australia
- Country: Australia
- Coordinates: 31°54′09″S 116°10′51″E
- Owned by: Shire of Mundaring
- Find a Grave: Mundaring Cemetery

Western Australia Heritage Register
- Official name: Mundaring Cemetery
- Type: Municipal Inventory
- Criteria: Exceptional significance
- Designated: 8 March 2016
- Reference no.: 8537
- Municipality: Shire of Mundaring

Mundaring Cemetery is located at the intersection of Yarri Grove and Railway Terrace, Mundaring, Western Australia.

Mundaring Cemetery was gazetted as a burial ground in 1906.

Prior to the development of the Metropolitan Cemeteries Board each local council was responsible for maintaining their own cemeteries and trustees were appointed to run a cemetery and pass by-laws.

Before the creation of Mundaring Cemetery families travelled to Midland and Guildford for funerals.

The Swan Express newspaper suggested the location of the Mundaring Cemetery was not proving an ideal site for "the city of the dead" as the ground was too rocky.

The earliest burials took place in the Anglican section of the cemetery and the earliest headstone that survives is that of Albert Lemmey, who died at the age of three in 1916. The next recorded burial was that of Private Gordon Jacques of the 28th Battalion. Jacques had been gassed during World War I and returned home for care, dying shortly afterwards in January 1919. His brother carved the timber enclosure that surrounds the grave.

The Mundaring Cemetery is administered by the Shire of Mundaring and, since 2007, is no longer available for interments unless already reserved.

== See also ==
- Parkerville Children's Home bush cemetery
- Wooroloo cemetery
