= Parkerville Children's Home bush cemetery =

Cemetery in Mundaring Shire, Western Australia

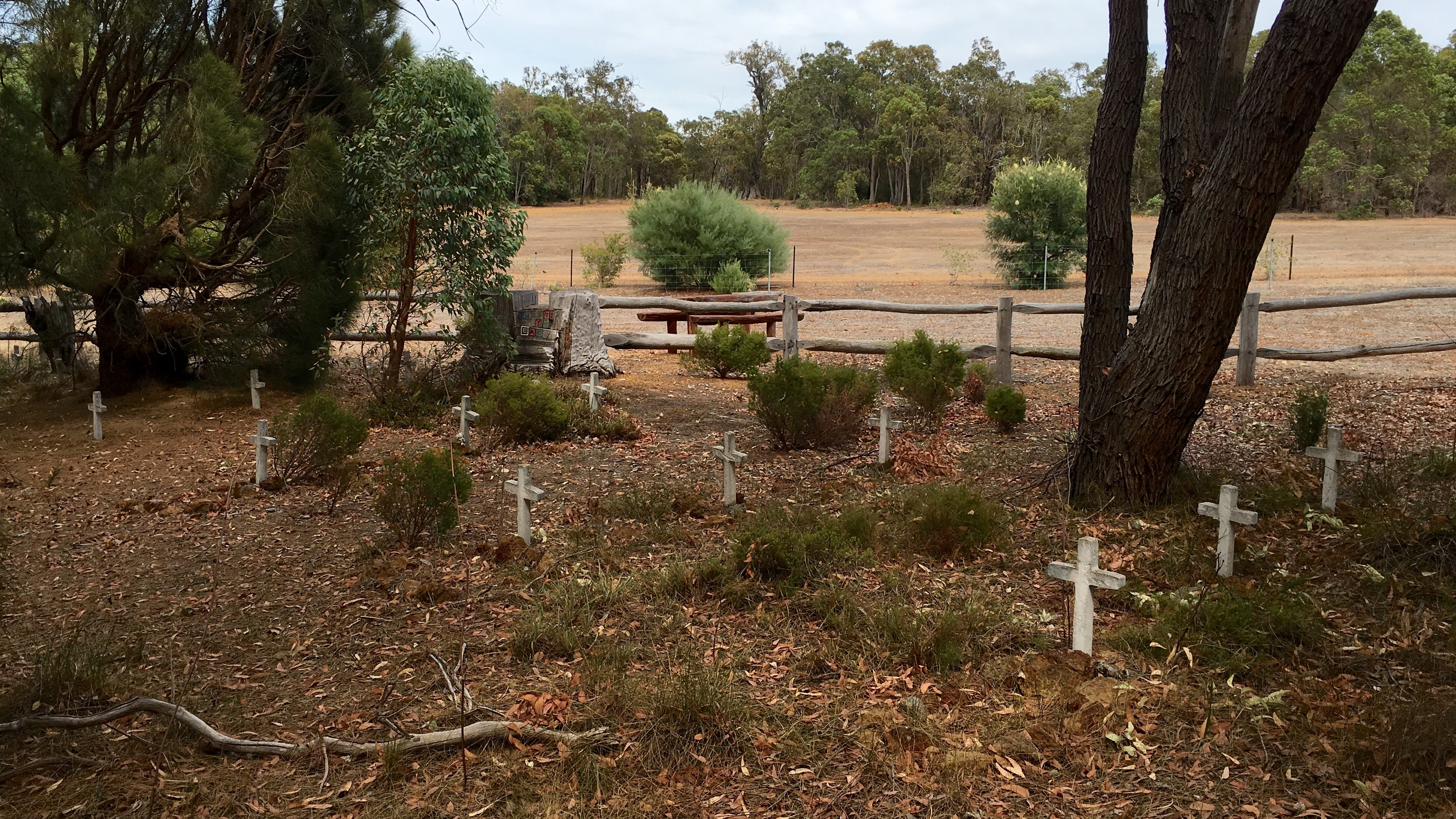
- Parkerville Children's Home bush cemetery

Details
- Location: Hovea, Western Australia
- Country: Australia
- Coordinates: 31°51′57″S 116°07′13″E
- Owned by: Parkerville Children and Youth Care (Inc)
- Find a Grave: Parkerville Children's Home bush cemetery

Western Australia Heritage Register
- Official name: Parkerville Children's Home & Cemetery
- Type: State Register
- Designated: 24 November 2000
- Reference no.: 8546

The Parkerville Children's Home Bush Cemetery was part of the Parkerville Children's Home (originally The League of Charity Home for Waifs and Stray Babies). The Home was founded in 1903 by Anglican nuns led by Sister Kate. Parkerville Children's Home is located in Parkerville, Western Australia, and continues to operate.

The numbers of children at Parkerville Children's Home increased from 22 in 1903, to approximately 109 in 1914. Conditions were very hard during that time and the Home relied on philanthropic donations to continue.

When a child died the Sisters would carry the simple coffins by horse and cart along the small dirt track from the Home. The cemetery is located 3 kilometres (1.9 mi) west of the home. There are approximately 30 children buried in the cemetery who died between 1903 and 1919, but the names of only 24 are known. They are listed on a plaque by the entrance gate.

A bushfire destroyed the wooden crosses on each grave and these were replaced with the existing concrete crosses. One early tombstone remains, that of baby Mary.

== See also ==
- Mundaring Cemetery
- Wooroloo cemetery
