= Old Northam Road =

Road in Perth, Western Australia

Coordinates: 31.85005°S 116.28988°E

Old Northam Road Western Australia

General information
- Type: Road
- Length: 9.39 km (5.8 mi)

Major junctions
- Southwest end: Great Eastern Highway (National Highway 94), Sawyers Valley
- Thomas Street; Government Road
- Northeast end: Great Eastern Highway (National Highway 94), Wooroloo

Location(s)
- Major suburbs: Chidlow

Old Northam Road is a 9.39-kilometre-long (5.83 mi) road in the outer eastern suburbs of Perth, Western Australia. It terminates at Great Eastern Highway at both ends, and forms the main street of the town of Chidlow.

It was previously considered a main route from Perth to Northam, along with the alternative route via The Lakes, which is now part of Great Eastern Highway.
