= Chidlow, Western Australia =

Chidlow
- Suburb
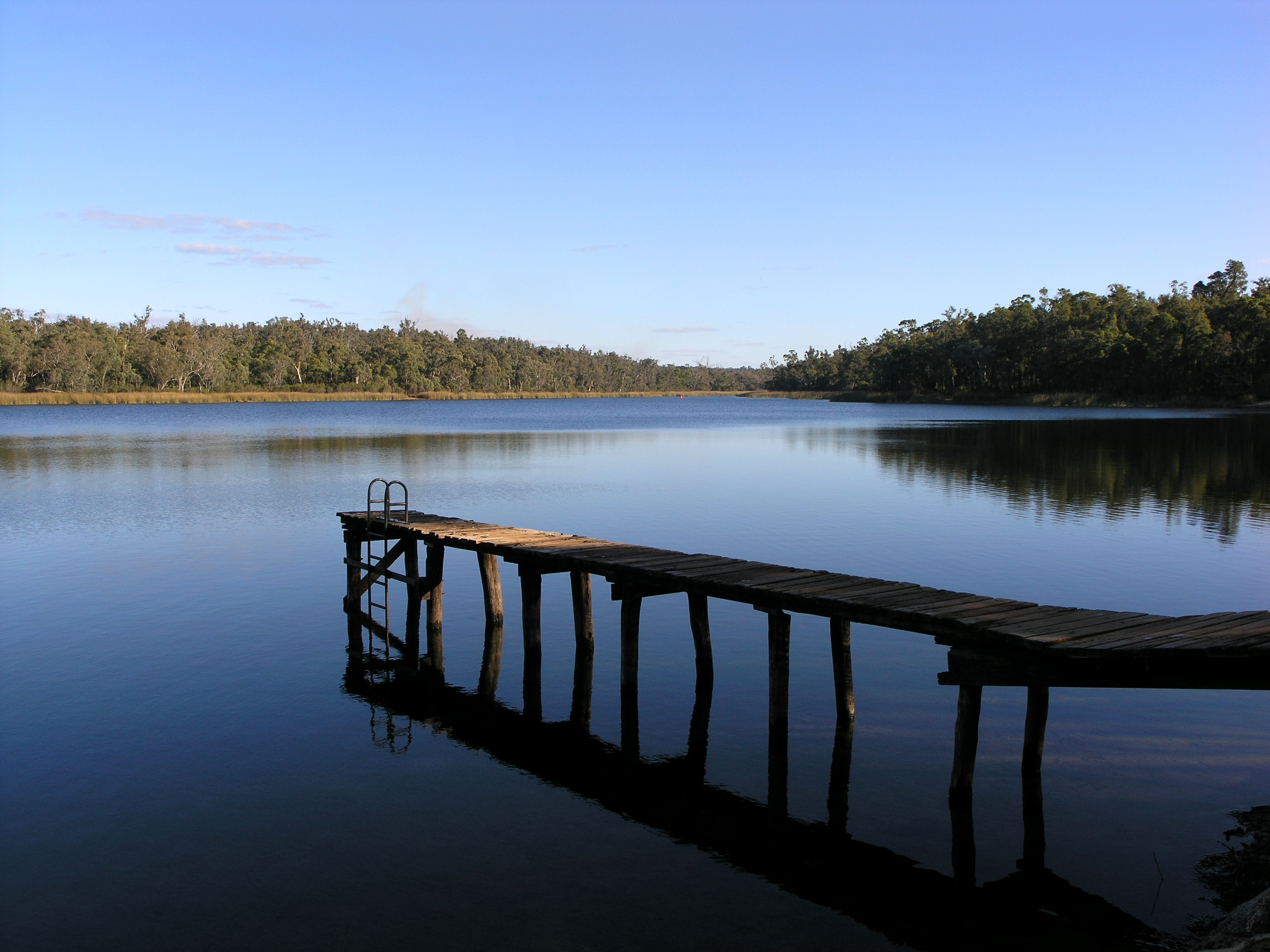
- Lake Leschenaultia
- Interactive map of Chidlow
- Coordinates: 31.857°S 116.272°E
- Country: Australia
- State: Western Australia
- City: Perth
- LGA: Shire of Mundaring

Government
  - State electorate: Swan Hills
  - Federal division: Bullwinkel

Population
  - Total: 1,821 (SAL 2021)
- Postcode: 6556
Suburbs around Chidlow
Gidgegannup	Gidgegannup	Wooroloo
Mount Helena	Chidlow	Beechina
Sawyers Valley	Gorrie	The Lakes

Chidlow is a small community in the Shire of Mundaring approximately 45 kilometres east of Perth, Western Australia.

== History ==
The Chidlow townsite was originally known variously as Chidlow's Flat, Chidlow's Springs or Chidlow's Well after a well and stockyard on the old Mahogany Creek to Northam road. The well was sunk by William Chidlow, a pioneer of the Northam district, who originally established the Northam road. Chidlow arrived in the Swan River Colony in 1831. Settlement began in 1883 when it became known that Chidlow's Well was to be the terminus of the second section of the Eastern Railway, which was opened in March 1884. Chidlow's Well railway station and townsite were renamed Chidlow in 1920.

The railway station and yard were of significance in the operation of the Eastern Railway from the 1880s to the 1960s. Lake Leschenaultia was originally constructed to provide water for the steam trains. Various proposals have been put forward to rebuild the railway to Midland especially due to the restricted nature of public transport to the Chidlow area. Nowadays, the Railway Reserve Heritage Trail retraces the 70 kilometres of the old Eastern Railway, which was constructed from Fremantle to York in the 1880s.

== Military history ==
During World War II, Chidlow was the location of a significant Army camp on the Old Northam Road near Haigh and Forge Roads. Erection of camp buildings at Chidlow was completed in March 1943.

Designated a brigade camp with three battalions, Chidlow's Army Camp was constructed to accommodate up to 1,000 troops in some 15 camp areas.

== Attractions ==
Since the closure of the railway the Chidlow community has adjusted from being an important transport location to more of a rural retreat location. The Railway Reserve Heritage Trail has become one of the major recreational facilities in the Shire of Mundaring, and is suitable for walking, cycling and horse riding.

The Chidlow Tavern sits opposite the park where the Chidlow's Wells Station once stood, as-well as a cafe, pharmacy, masseur, and hairdresser.

Lake Leschenaultia is popular with both locals and visitors and provides safe swimming, canoe hire, walking trails, bike tracks, and camping.

== Transport ==
=== Bus ===
- 328 Chidlow to Midland Station – serves Thomas Street, Memorial Avenue, Willcox Street and Elliott Road
- 331 Wundowie to Mundaring – serves Old Northam Road, Thomas Street, Memorial Avenue, Willcox Street and Elliott Road
