= Wooroloo Sanatorium and cemetery =

Heritage site in Wooroloo, Western Australia

The Wooroloo Sanatorium and Cemetery is located on Linley Valley Road, Wooroloo, Western Australia. The Sanatorium operated from 1914 until transferred to Department of Corrective Services in 1970. The cemetery opened in 1915 and continues to operate.

== Wooroloo Sanatorium ==
Designations

Western Australia Heritage Register
- Official name: Wooroloo Sanatorium
- Type: State Register
- Designated: 30 August 2002
- Reference no.: 8566

Wooroloo Sanatorium, also known as Wooroloo Hospital, was established by the State Government in response to infectious diseases, such as typhoid, diphtheria and tuberculosis, and leprosy, that were widely prevalent in the aftermath of the mass migration that came as a result of the gold rushes in Western Australia in the early part of the twentieth century.

Treatment of tuberculosis was focused on fresh air and sunshine and the site at Wooroloo was chosen because of the beauty of the countryside and elevation of the site. Patients with leprosy were also isolated at Wooroloo. The sanatorium opened 8 October 1914.

Patients were segregated according to gender, and the severity of their case. The open fronted 10 bed wards, orientated north and east, were designed to maximize patient fresh air and sunlight. As well as providing for staff, there were buildings to house administration, a laboratory, operating room, kitchen, dining room, billiard room, and a school for younger patients. The sanatorium had its own laundry, bakery, and power-house, making it a relatively self-contained operation.

The Wooroloo Sanatorium comprised 36 major buildings constructed between 1914 and 1917 and is the only large scale purpose-built tuberculosis sanatorium in Western Australia.

== Wooroloo Cemetery ==
Wooroloo Cemetery

Details
- Location: Wooroloo, Western Australia
- Country: Australia
- Coordinates: 31°48′33″S 116°19′40″E
- Owned by: Shire of Mundaring
- Find a Grave: Wooroloo Cemetery

Western Australia Heritage Register
- Official name: Wooroloo Cemetery
- Type: State Register
- Designated: 30 August 2002
- Reference no.: 8571

The Wooroloo Cemetery was originally surveyed on 15 September 1902 and gazetted on 13 July 1906. The first burials were recorded in 1915.

The Wooroloo Cemetery was the only one in Western Australia established specifically to serve the nearby hospital.

The cemetery was originally controlled by a board established on 25 June 1916. It consisted of prominent members of the Wooroloo community, including members of the local Road Board, orchardists and publicans.

On the 29 November 1957, the control and management of the Wooroloo Cemetery was vested with the Mundaring Road Board. The cemetery contains graves of people from many parts of Western Australia who were brought to the Woorolooo Sanitorium on account of their illness and in particular tuberculosis between 1915 and 1970. The names found in Wooroloo Cemetery are quite broad in their ethnic mix, such as English, Irish, Scottish, German, Yugoslavian, Chinese, Japanese and Aboriginal.

There are up to two thousand persons interred in the cemetery. While many graves relate to the patients at the sanatorium, other graves are linked to returned servicemen. The majority of the graves associated with the Sanatorium are mounds identified simply by a cast iron marker bearing the plot number as most were far from family and friends.

The Commonwealth War Graves Commission lists 43 war graves at the cemetery.

== Heritage listing ==
In 2002 the Wooroloo Sanatorium and Cemetery were listed on Western Australia's Heritage Register for the contribution made by the places to Western Australia's cultural heritage.

Environment and Heritage Minister Judy Edwards said “both the Wooroloo Sanatorium and Wooroloo Cemetery are significant reminders of the virulence of tuberculosis between 1915 and 1959. It is the only cemetery in WA to have been established to initially serve a hospital. In addition, the large number of burials at the site between 1915 and 1925 provide a valuable insight into the social and economic circumstances of WA during that time.”

== Current use ==
By the 1960s, the sanatorium was no longer required and the institution was operated as a geriatric and a district hospital. The Wooroloo Sanatorium was subsequently converted to a minimum-security prison farm after the Department of Corrective Services officially acquired the site in June 1970.

The Wooroloo Cemetery is administered by the Shire of Mundaring and still available for interments.

== See also ==
- Mundaring Cemetery
- Parkerville Children's Home bush cemetery
