= Chidlow railway station =

Former railway station in Western Australia

Coordinates: 31°51′46″S 116°16′02″E

The extension of the Eastern Railway line in Western Australia to Chidlow's Well in 1884 was immediately useful to those in the region, to quote the West Australian of 17 April 1885:

Already we find the daily train to be a great convenience. The difficulty of obtaining goods from Perth and Fremantle within a reasonable time is a thing of the past. And the comfort of travelling by train to Chidlow's Well, though nothing to boast of, is certainly better than going by coach, and quicker.

Up until its closure, it had tearooms, and the overnight sleeper train 'The Westland' to Kalgoorlie had a refreshment stop at Chidlow. In some regularly reprinted photographs of the station buildings and platform the sign is for Chidlow's Well Refreshment Station.

In all Working Timetables (WTT) during the operation of this line, there was an arrival and departure time, owing to either taking on water for steam engines, or change in crew.

The Bellevue to Chidlow railway line involved the encounter with the Darling Scarp requiring extra power for the up line, and considerable extra caution for the down line.

The station was closed in 1966 at the time of the Avon Valley rail route being opened, and the old Eastern Railway route became superfluous to WAGR needs.

The Mundaring and Hills Historical Society usually have a photograph of this railway station in their annual calendar.
