= Acacia Prison =

Prison in Western Australia

- Location in Western Australia
- Location: Wooroloo, Western Australia, 50 km east of Perth; 31.8351°S 116.3409°E
- Status: Operational
- Security class: Medium (Male)
- Capacity: 1525
- Opened: 5 May 2001
- Managed by: Serco

Acacia Prison is a medium security prison facility located in Wooroloo, Western Australia. The prison was opened in May 2001.

Acacia was the first privately managed prison in Western Australia and was managed by Australian Integration Management Services Corporation (AIMS Corp) for its first five years of operation. Serco began managing the prison in 2006. The prison employs over 300 custodial officers and more than 200 non-custodial staff to run day-to-day operation.

The prison provides open campus-style living. Prisoners use fingerprint recognition technology to move within the boundaries of the prison as well as gaining access to their bank accounts and purchasing goods. The prison has a self-care and pre-self care section where prisoners cook and clean for themselves. In 2008 the prison began adding additional bunks to cells, increasing capacity from 800 to 1000.

Acacia Prison has an education unit run by custodial and non-custodial staff including teachers, psychologists, criminologists, resettlement staff and reintegration officers. They teach a range of classes including violence against women, violent offender treatment programs, domestic violence, drug and alcohol programs and "think first" classes.

Serco won the contract to operate the prison after a tender that involved submissions from AIMS, MTC and Serco. Serco's contract went out for tender on 16 May 2016.

In August 2021, a riot broke out at the prison with the Special Operations Group storming the prison after negotiations with prisoners who had barricaded themselves in one of the units had failed. Over 50 prisoners were inside the unit at the time. The Department of Justice in investigating Serco following the incident.

== Notes ==
- Acacia Prison inmates riot in 'protracted incident' after COVID-19 control measures deployed, 27 feb 2022.
