= HBF (insurer) =

Australian health insurance provider

HBF Health Limited
- Type: Not for profit
- Industry: Private health insurance
- Founded: 1941
- Headquarters: Perth, Western Australia, Australia
- Area served: Australia
- Key people: Dr Lachlan Henderson (CEO)
- Products: Health insurance
- Revenue: ▲ A$2.32 billion (2025)
- Net income: ▲ A$131.2 million (2025)
- Website: hbf.com.au

HBF Health Limited is an Australian health insurance provider. It is Australia's fifth biggest private health insurance provider with a national market share of 7.82%. Although HBF does operate nationwide, the vast majority of its members are located in Western Australia, where HBF is headquartered.

== History ==
In 1941, HBF was established as the Metropolitan Hospitals Benefit Fund of Western Australia, with the core purpose of providing affordable health services to Western Australians. HBF's purpose can be directly traced back to its origins as a key provider of social services prior to the introduction of universal government health cover in Medicare. It was established to provide a pool of funds to ensure the ongoing provision of affordable health services for members. Since its inception, HBF has grown to become the leading provider of health insurance in Western Australia.

In 2009, HBF had 7.7% of the national market share for private health insurance. In 2021, HBF completed the acquisition of Brisbane-based CUA Health Pty Ltd. As of 2021, this increased the company's market share to approximately 8%, with 17% of members living outside of Western Australia. In 2022, HBF acquired Life Ready Physio and in 2023, completed the acquisition of Queensland Country Health Fund.

== Locations ==
HBF has 8 branches located throughout Western Australia.

== Run for a Reason ==
The HBF Run for a Reason is an annual long-distance walking and running event held in Perth since 2010. The event sees participants fundraising for charities and walking or running through the Perth City in participants' choice of a 3km, 12km or half-marathon length route. In 2025 the event garnered over 40,000 active participants.
