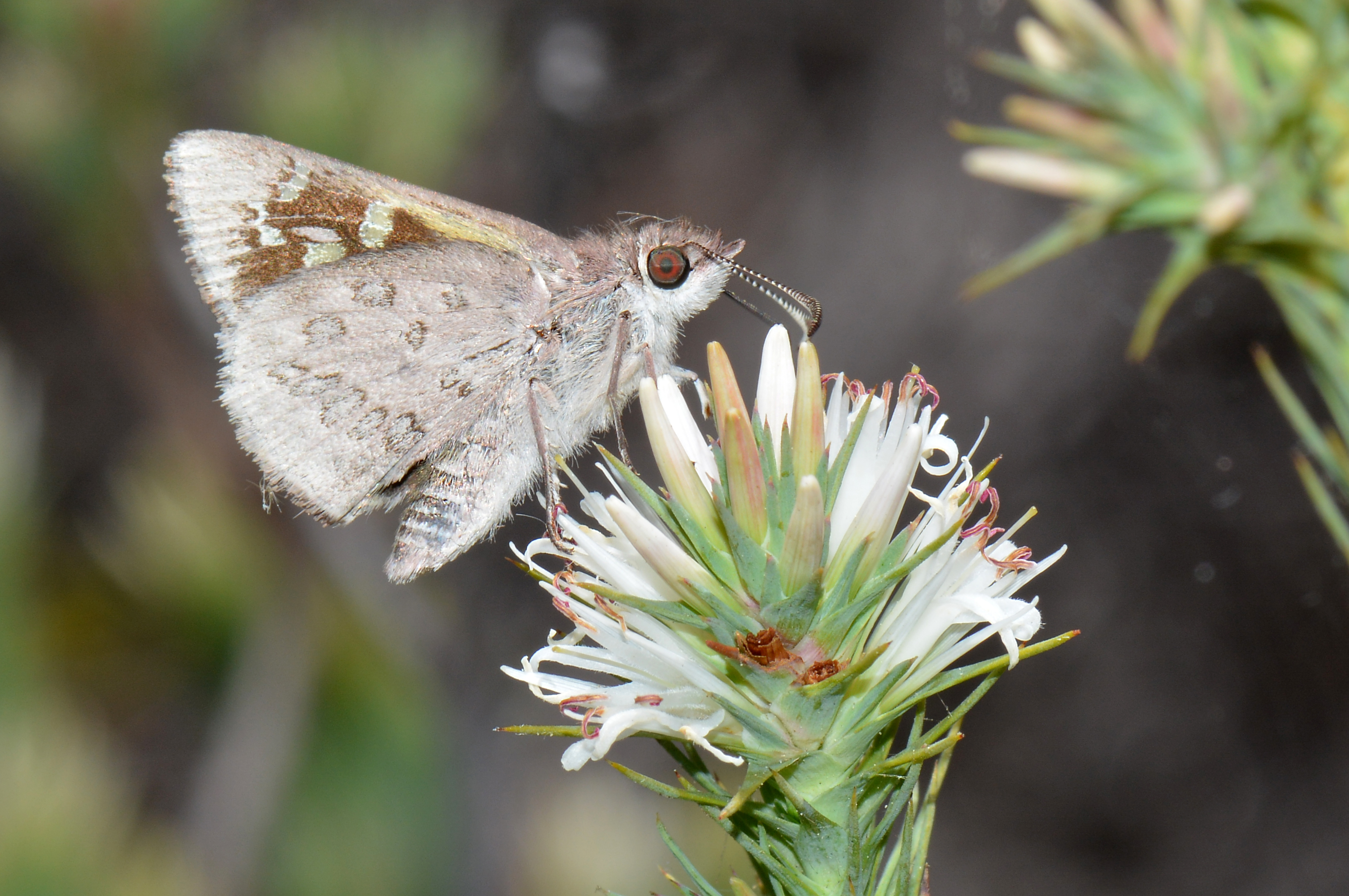
- M. cyanophracta feeding on Andersonia aristata

Scientific classification
- Kingdom: Animalia
- Phylum: Arthropoda
- Class: Insecta
- Order: Lepidoptera
- Family: Hesperiidae
- Genus: Mesodina
- Species: M. cyanophracta

Binomial name
- Mesodina cyanophracta Lower, 1911

Synonyms
- Mesodina halyzia cyanophracta Lower, 1911

= Mesodina cyanophracta =

Species of butterfly

Mesodina cyanophracta, the blue iris-skipper, is a butterfly of the family Hesperiidae. It is endemic to the north-west and south-west coast of the state of Western Australia.

The wingspan is about 30 mm.

The larvae feed on Patersonia juncacea, Patersonia lanata, Patersonia umbrosa var. xanthina and Patersonia occidentalis.
