= Beechina, Western Australia =

Suburb of Perth, Western Australia

Coordinates: 31°50′S 116°19′E

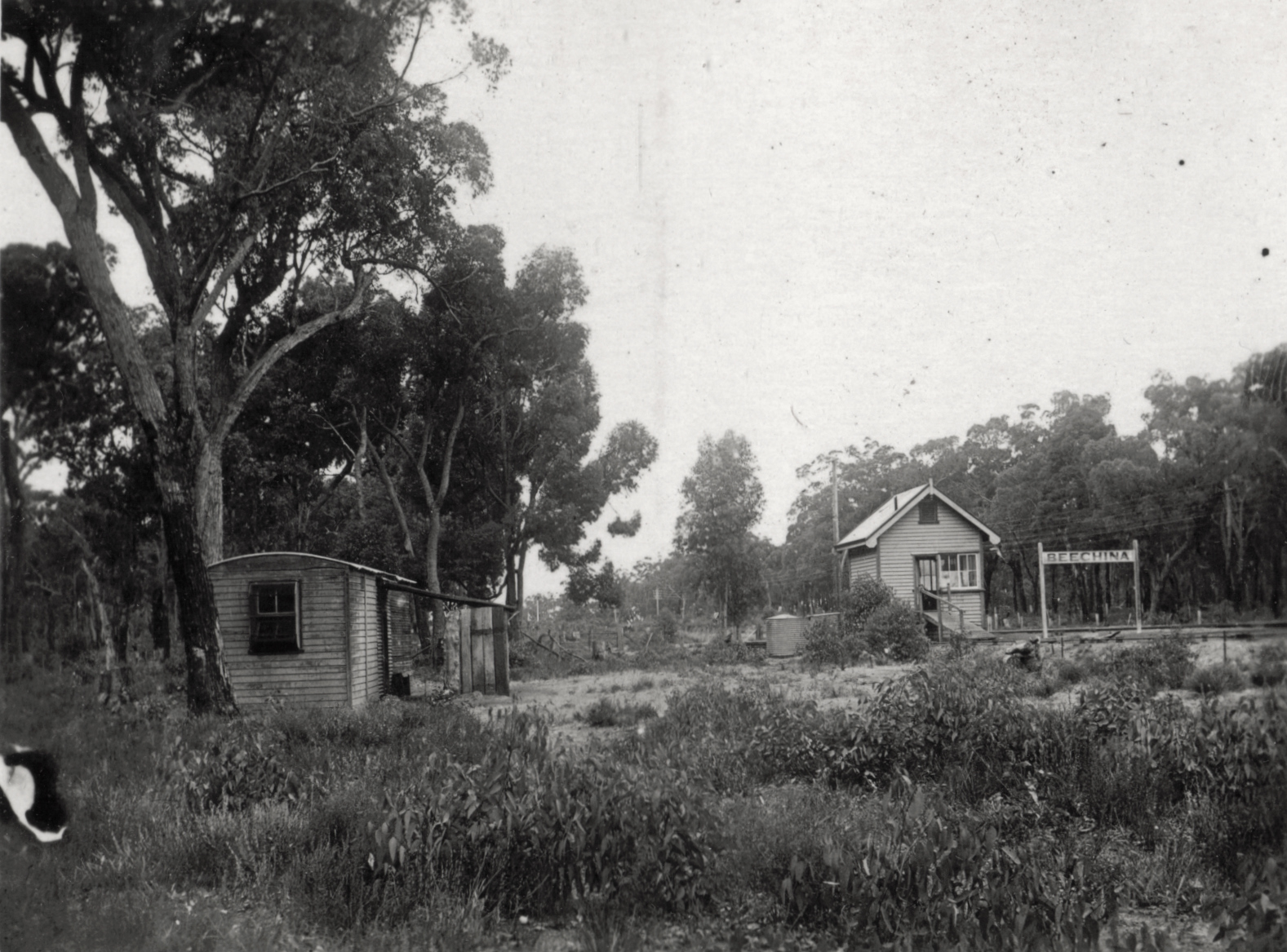
Beechina

Beechina is a locality in the Shire of Mundaring in Western Australia. The word "Beechina" is the Nyungar name for a white gum valley to the northeast of the locality. It was first recorded by surveyor P. Chauncy in 1847, when he was carrying out the survey of the first road to Northam.

== Transport ==
=== Bus ===
- 331 Wundowie to Mundaring – serves Old Northam Road
