= El Caballo Blanco, Wooroloo =

Defunct amusement park

El Caballo Blanco (The White Horse)
- Interactive map of El Caballo Blanco (The White Horse)
- Location: Wooroloo, Perth, Western Australia
- Coordinates: 31°48′27″S 116°21′32″E
- Opened: 1974; 52 years ago
- Closed: 1995; 31 years ago (Arena); 2019; 7 years ago (Resort)
- Theme: Horses

El Caballo Blanco (Spanish for The White Horse) was the name for an equine Andalusian theme park and resort that operated in the north-eastern Perth suburb of Wooroloo in Western Australia from 1974.

== History ==
The first Spanish horses arrived in Australia in 1972 and were brought to the El Caballo complex at Wooroloo, by the Western Australian business entrepreneur, Ray Williams. Williams imported the well known stallion Bodeguero and a number of mares, as the foundation of the 'Bodeguero Stud'. Many of the present day Andalusian horses in Australia trace back to Bodeguero and those first mares. El Caballo Resort was established in 1974 at Wooroloo and their dancing horses were a popular tourist attraction.

Williams, who was married to Audrey C Lockyer, met Edith Evans, an El Paso Texan born but Durango Mexico pioneer, female Rejoneador (horseback bullfighter) and actress in 'el caballo torero' movie whilst forming the registry of Andalusion horses (in approx 1977). In 1978 Williams established the El Caballo Blanco theme park at Catherine Fields near the Sydney suburb of Narellan, New South Wales with the wealthy entrepreneur Emmannual Margolin. Its main attraction was its Andalusian dancing stallions sent from the WA stud, but the park also featured miniature Fallabella horses, and a number of non-equestrian related amusements such as water slides, train rides, and a small wildlife zoo.

His relationship with Edith Evans saw him leave Australia seeking bigger things. Williams and Edith Evans then went on to establish an El Caballo Blanco park at The Kingdom of Dancing Stallions in Buena Park in the US. Williams died in 1983 from self inflicted gunshot. A medical Alzheimer's diagnosis is proposed by some as well as relationship issues over financial stress.

After Williams' death in the US, Edith claimed bankruptcy on the U.S Kingdom of Dancing Stallions, and the operations of the various El Caballo Blanco theme parks in Australia gradually wound down and ceased. After quite some years, the Wooroloo complex in Western Australia once again hosting the famed Spanish dancing horse show. The horse show and arena continued until 1995, with the resort remaining operating until 2019. The Wooroloo site was then sold in May 2020 to the Aboriginal Housing Foundation for redevelopment.
