= Health Insurance Fund =

Health Insurance Fund of Australia Limited
- Trade name: Health Insurance Fund (HIF)
- Type: Non profit member fund
- Industry: Health Insurance
- Founded: 1954
- Headquarters: Perth, Western Australia, Australia
- Area served: Australia
- Products: Health insurance, Travel insurance, Life insurance
- Website: www.hif.com.au

Health Insurance Fund (HIF) is an Australian, not-for-profit insurer. In 1954 it was brought into existence as the WA Government Employee's Hospital and Medical Benefits Fund Incorporated. But has since undergone a series of name changes to better reflect the scope and services it provides.

HIF has majority market share for health funds in Western Australia. Its business model boasts a strong environmental focus. Currently, it is the only certified carbon neutral health fund in Australia.

== History ==
HIF (Health Insurance Fund of Australia) began in 1954 as the Western Australian Government Railways Employees’ Hospital and Medical Fund. Within a few months this name was changed to the Government Employees’ Hospital and Medical Benefits Fund Incorporated. In 1978, to comply with the Associations Incorporations Act 1895 (WA), HIF became the Health Insurance Fund of WA. In 2010, the fund changed its name to Health Insurance Fund of Australia Limited to reflect its nationally expanding client base. Also in 2010, data published by the Private Health Insurance Administration Council (PHIAC) revealed HIF to be the fastest growing not-for-profit Australian health fund for that financial year.

== Legal structure alterations ==
=== Legal structure prior to 2010 ===
In 2008, the Federal Government passed the Private Health Insurance Legislation Amendment Bill 2008 (Cth) (PHILA Act); seeking to amend the Private Health Insurance Act 2007 (Cth). This legislation governs the operation of all private health insurers. The PHILA Act required all insurers to qualify as a ‘company’ as stipulated by the Corporations Act 2001 (Cth). As a result of this, on 1 December 2009, the Western Australian Government passed legislation facilitating the transfer of HIF's status from an incorporated association under the Associations Incorporations Act 1987 (WA) to an Australian public company.

=== Legal structure today ===
Today HIF is an Australian public company limited by guarantee and governed by the Corporations Act 2001 (Cth). HIF is registered with the federal regulator, the Australian Securities and Investments Commission (ASIC) and the Private Health Insurance Administration Council (PHIAC) as an open access, not for profit, private, health insurer.

Private health insurance in Australia is heavily regulated. Prudential supervision is undertaken by PHIAC to ensure the company remains solvent. PHIAC publishes extensive statistics on the industry and annual financial statements for individual health funds. The pricing and features of health insurance products is regulated by the Department of Health and Ageing.

== Company culture ==
HIF holds the title of Australia’s first carbon neutral health fund, as certified by the Carbon Reduction Institute (CRI). From their analysis, HIF was able to construct and implement strategies to reduce their carbon footprint. After achieving significant reductions the company sought to offset remaining emissions through the purchase of carbon abatement credits.

HIF is involved with multiple charitable works. One of these is the Amanda Young Foundation: A not-for-profit charity dedicated to reducing deaths from Meningococcal Disease. HIF provides the Amanda Young Foundation with accommodation, resources, and administrative and accounting support.

HIF is strongly involved with SIDS & Kids Western Australia. This charity’s mission is to save the lives of infants through education and research. HIF also provide support for those affected by the sudden and unexpected death of a child. HIF sponsor a number of community initiatives, including:

- The Amanda Young Foundation.
- Diamond sponsors for the Perth Wildcats basketball team.

== See also ==
- Western Australian Government Railways
