= Wooroloo, Western Australia =

Wooroloo
- Town
- Interactive map of Wooroloo
- Coordinates: 31.803°S 116.314°E
- Country: Australia
- State: Western Australia
- LGA: Shire of Mundaring
- Location: 61 km (38 mi) from Perth
- Established: 1900s

Government
  - State electorate: Swan Hills
  - Federal division: Bullwinkel
- Elevation: 330 m (1,080 ft)

Population
  - Total: 445 (UCL 2021)
- Postcode: 6558
- Mean max temp: 23.1 °C (73.6 °F)
- Mean min temp: 10.9 °C (51.6 °F)
- Annual rainfall: 594.8 mm (23.42 in)

Wooroloo is a town on the outer fringe of the Perth metropolitan region, located off Great Eastern Highway in the eastern part of the Shire of Mundaring. At the 2021 census, Wooroloo had a population of 2,613.

== History ==
The name comes from a Noongar word that was first recorded in 1841, with other spellings also used. A timber mill operated by Byfield Brothers commenced operations in the 1880s, and Byfield's Mill was established as a railway stopping place for the Eastern Railway in 1893, being renamed to Wooroloo in 1897.

A school opened on 22 August 1903 with 22 children and one teacher, and a community hall was built with help from residents of nearby Chidlow in 1904; the townsite of Wooroloo was declared in 1913.

The Wooroloo Sanatorium for people with tuberculosis and leprosy was built in 1915, but by the 1960s the sanatorium was no longer required and the institution became a general hospital for the surrounding district. The facility was subsequently converted into a prison after Corrective Services took over the site in 1972.

In 1970, Ray Williams, a Perth businessman, travelled around the world looking for what he considered to be the perfect horse to breed and cross with Australian horses. He decided upon Andalusian horses after seeing them at an equestrian show in London, and subsequently travelled to Jerez de la Frontera, Spain and in September 1971 bought the stallion "Bodeguero" and five purebred mares. He then started the first Andalusian stud in Australia at Wooroloo, "Bodeguero Stud", which in 1974 was incorporated into El Caballo Blanco, now El Caballo Resort.

== Present day ==
Wooroloo contains a community hall, liquor and general store, post office and primary school (1903), and was also home to El Caballo Resort, with a convention centre and 18-hole golf course, as well as horse dressage displays.

The town is the site of two major prisons in the Western Australian prison system, the minimum-security Wooroloo Prison and the medium-security Acacia Prison. The pool at Wooroloo Prison is open to local residents.

The population in 1991 was 761, and in 1996 was 853.

== Wooroloo Brook ==
See also Wooroloo Brook

The water course and catchment of the same name has its source in the locality.

== Transport ==
Wooroloo, at 36 miles and 40 chains from Perth, was a booking railway station from 1897 to 1965 on the Eastern Railway.

Wooroloo currently has the 328 Transperth bus three times weekdays from Midland, with a journey time of approximately 50 minutes; also has two 331 trips during weekdays from Mundaring, with a journey time of approximately 35 minutes. All services are operated by Swan Transit.

=== Bus ===
- 331 Wundowie to Mundaring – serves Werribee Road, Bailup Road, Wilson Street, Government Road and Old Northam Road

== See also ==
- 2021 Wooroloo bushfires
