= Xanthoparmelia elevata =

Scientific classification
- Kingdom: Fungi
- Division: Ascomycota
- Class: Lecanoromycetes
- Order: Lecanorales
- Family: Parmeliaceae
- Genus: Xanthoparmelia
- Species: X. elevata

Binomial name
- Xanthoparmelia elevata Elix (2003)
- Holotype: Western Australia

Species of foliose lichen

Xanthoparmelia elevata is a species of foliose lichen in the family Parmeliaceae, described by John Alan Elix in 2003. It is found exclusively in Western Australia, growing on granite outcrops in the region's southwest.

== Taxonomy ==
Xanthoparmelia elevata was identified as a distinct species due to its unique morphological and chemical traits, which differentiate it from closely related species such as Xanthoparmelia neorimalis. The species epithet, elevata, refers to the elevated position of its lobes on stilt-like rhizines.

== Description ==
The thallus of Xanthoparmelia elevata is small-foliose, loosely attached to the substrate, and spans up to 3 cm (1 in) wide. The lobes are separate and rarely overlap, measuring 0.3–1.0 mm in width with linear and sometimes branched edges. The upper surface is initially yellow-green and becomes blackened with age, especially at the lobe tips which are shiny and may show irregular white patches. The lichen's texture evolves from smooth to cracked and areolate at the centre as it ages.

The lower surface ranges from pale brown to darker brown at the lobe tips and is dotted with simple to tufted, brown to dark brown rhizines. Apothecia (fruiting bodies) are common on this lichen, starting as small, stalked structures and flattening out as they mature. The spores formed within these fruiting bodies are ellipsoid and measure approximately 7–8 by 4–5 μm.

Chemically, Xanthoparmelia elevata is characterised by the presence of usnic acid and salazinic acid, with minor traces of consalazinic acid and atranorin. These substances contribute to the lichen's reactions to chemical spot tests, which include turning yellow then dark red when treated with potassium hydroxide (K) solution.

== Habitat and distribution ==
Xanthoparmelia elevata is endemic to Western Australia, with occurrences noted from John Forrest National Park east of Perth to various other granite-rich locations across the southwestern part of the state. It typically grows on sun-exposed granite surfaces within Eucalyptus woodlands and heathlands.

== See also ==
- List of Xanthoparmelia species
