= List of acts of the Legislative Council of Western Australia from 1878 =

This is a list of acts of the Legislative Council of Western Australia for the year 1878.

== 1878 ==
Short title, or popular name	Citation	Royal assent
Long title
Partition Act 1878	42 Vict. No. 1	3 July 1878
An Act to amend the Law relating to Partition.
Contingent Remainders Act 1878	42 Vict. No. 2	3 July 1878
An Act to amend the Law as to Contingent Remainders.
Factors Acts Amendment Act 1878	42 Vict. No. 3	3 July 1878
An Act to amend the Factors Acts.
	42 Vict. No. 4	3 July 1878
An Act to amend "The Waste Lands Unlawful Occupation Act, 1872." (Note: Waste Lands Unlawful Occupation Act 1872 (36 Vict. No. 8))
Land Quarantine Act 1878	42 Vict. No. 5	3 July 1878
An Act to make provision for the better prevention of the spread of Infectious or Contagious Diseases.
Real Property Limitation Act 1878	42 Vict. No. 6	3 July 1878
An Act for the further limitations of Actions and Suits relating to Real Property.
	42 Vict. No. 7	3 July 1878
An Act to confirm the Expenditure for the services of the year One thousand eight hundred and seventy-seven, beyond the grant for that year.
Perth Drainage Rate Act 1875 Amendment Act 1878	42 Vict. No. 8	3 July 1878
An Act to amend "The Perth Drainage Rate Act, 1875." (Note: Perth Drainage Rate Act 1875 (39 Vict. No. 17))
	42 Vict. No. 9	3 July 1878
An Act to repeal "The Kangaroo Ordinance, 1853." (Note: Kangaroo Ordinance 1853 (16 Vict. No. 14))
Vendor and Purchaser Act 1878	42 Vict. No. 10	3 July 1878
An Act to amend the law of Vendor and Purchaser, and further to simplify title to Land.
Trespass Act 1872 Amendment Act 1878	42 Vict. No. 11	3 July 1878
An Act to amend "The Trespass Act, 1872." (Note: Trespass Act 1872 (36 Vict. No. 9))
Wines, Beer, and Spirit Sale Act 1872 Amendment Act 1878	42 Vict. No. 12	3 July 1878
An Act to further amend "The Wines, Beer, and Spirit Sale Act, 1872." (Note: Wines, Beer, and Spirit Sale Act 1872 (36 Vict. No. 5))
Vaccination Act 1878	42 Vict. No. 13	16 July 1878
An Act to extend and make compulsory the practice of Vaccination.
Wild Cattle Nuisance Act 1871 Amendment Act 1878	42 Vict. No. 14	16 July 1878
An Act to amend "The Wild Cattle Nuisance Act, 1871." (Note: Wild Cattle Nuisance Act 1871 (34 Vict. No. 24))
Transfer of Land Act 1874 Amendment Act 1878	42 Vict. No. 15	16 July 1878
An Act to amend "The Transfer of Land Act, 1874." (Note: Transfer of Land Act 1874 (38 Vict. No. 13))
Municipal Institutions Act 1876 Amendment Act 1878	42 Vict. No. 16	16 July 1878
An Act to amend "The Municipal Institutions' Act, 1876." (Note: Municipal Institutions' Act 1876 (40 Vict. No. 13))
	42 Vict. No. 17	16 July 1878
An Act to enforce the Payment of Duty on the Transfer of Land.
Jetties Regulation Act 1878	42 Vict. No. 18	16 July 1878
An Act to empower the Governor in Council to make regulations for the use and management of Jetties and other similar works, and to make other provision respecting the same.
Foreign Seamen's Offences Act 1878	42 Vict. No. 19	16 July 1878
An Act to confer jurisdiction in certain cases over Foreign Merchant Seamen.
	42 Vict. No. 20	16 July 1878
An Act to explain "The Colonial Passengers' Amendment Ordinance, 1868." (Note: Colonial Passengers' Amendment Ordinance 1868 (32 Vict. No. 14)) (32 Vic., No. 14.)
Customs Ordinance 1860 Amendment Act 1878	42 Vict. No. 21	24 July 1878
An Act to farther amend "The Customs Ordinance, 1860." (Note: Customs Ordinance 1860 (24 Vict. No. 5))
Loan Act 1878	42 Vict. No. 22	24 July 1878
An Act for raising the sum of Two Hundred Thousand Pounds (Note: £200,000 in 1878 is equivalent to A$34,300,000 in 2022.) by Loan for the construction of certain Public Works.
Game Act 1874 Amendment Act 1878	42 Vict. No. 23	24 July 1878
An Act to further amend "The Game Act, 1874." (Note: Game Act 1874 (38 Vict. No. 4))
Boat Licensing Act 1878	42 Vict. No. 24	24 July 1878
An Act to repeal certain Ordinances now in force respecting the licensing of Boats and Boatmen, and to make other provision in lieu thereof.
Jury Act 1871 Amendment Act 1878	42 Vict. No. 25	24 July 1878
An Act to amend "The Jury Act, 1871." (Note: Jury Act 1871 (35 Vict. No. 8))
	42 Vict. No. 26	24 July 1878
An Act to repeal "The District Roads Board Audit Act, 1877." (Note: District Roads Board Audit Act 1877 (41 Vict. No. 3))
Eastern Railway Act 1878	42 Vict. No. 27	24 July 1878
An Act to authorise the construction of a Railway from Fremantle to Guildford.
	42 Vict. No. 28	24 July 1878
An Act to amend "The High School Act, 1876." (Note: High School Act 1876 (40 Vict. No. 8))
	42 Vict. No. 29	24 July 1878
An Act to appropriate the sum of One Hundred and Fifty-four Thousand Seven Hundred and Eleven Pounds Fourteen Shillings and Eightpence (Note: £154,711 14s 8d in 1878 is equivalent to A$26,600,000 in 2022.) out of the General Revenue of the Colony for the Service of the year One thousand eight hundred and seventy-nine.
Northern District Special Revenue Act 1873 Amendment Act 1878	42 Vict. No. 30	24 July 1878
An Act to amend "The Northern District Special Revenue Act, 1873." (Note: Northern District Special Revenue Act 1873 (37 Vict. No. 10))
Railways Act 1878	42 Vict. No. 31	24 July 1878
An Act to consolidate and amend divers Acts now in force relating to the survey, construction, and maintenance of Railways.

== Sources ==
- "legislation.wa.gov.au".
