= Twin Sisters (locomotive) =

Early British steam locomotive

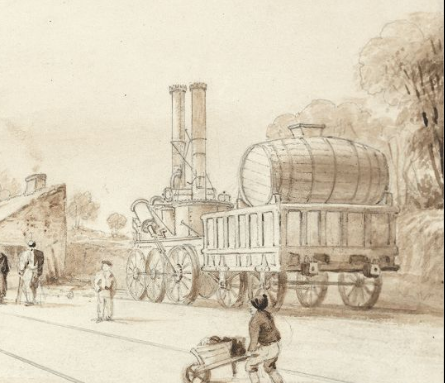
- A portion of Shaw's "View on the Liverpool and Manchester Railway with the Locomotive Twin Sisters in a Siding" (1830)
Type and origin
- Power type: Steam
- Designer: Robert Stephenson
- Builder: Robert Stephenson and Company
- Build date: 1829
Specifications
- Configuration
  - Whyte: 0-6-0
- Gauge: 4 ft 8 1/2 in (1,435 mm)
- Driver dia.: 48 in (1,200 mm)
- Fuel type: coke
- Boiler pressure: 50 psi (340 kPa)
- Cylinders: 2
- Cylinder size: 9 in × 24 in (230 mm × 610 mm)
Performance figures
- Maximum speed: 12 miles per hour (19.3 km/h)
Career
- Operators: Liverpool and Manchester Railway
- First run: 1829
- Retired: December 1831

The Twin Sisters was an early steam locomotive, built for use during the construction of the Liverpool and Manchester Railway. It was distinctive for its use of two vertical boilers with a pair of separate chimneys, leading to its name.

== Earlier locomotives for constructing the Liverpool and Manchester Railway ==
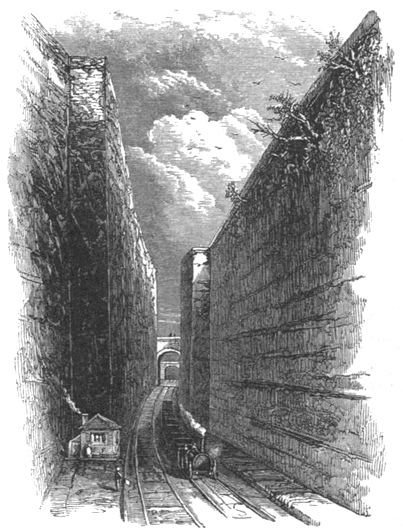
The deep sandstone cutting at Olive Mount

By 1828 the Liverpool and Manchester Railway was under construction and their first steam locomotive had already been supplied to assist with this. This was one of the first railways built outside the coal-producing areas and so the local landowners were hostile to railways generally and particularly to any smoke they produced. The enabling Act of Parliament for the Liverpool and Manchester Railway required that locomotives should not produce smoke.

This first locomotive was described as the Liverpool Travelling Engine in Robert Stephenson's drawings, but would later become known as the Lancashire Witch. (Note: Named on its transfer to the Bolton & Leigh Railway.) It used a new boiler design with twin furnaces that burned coke rather than coal to reduce smoke. The furnaces were fired sequentially, an idea that would later be patented and used in the Lancashire stationary boiler. The new boiler was the idea of Henry Booth, who had approached the L&M board in April 1827 with his ideas for coke-burning. Although Booth was the company secretary and treasurer of the L&M, he was also an inventive engineer and collaborated closely with the Stephensons, particularly on developments in boilers.

The Travelling Engine was ordered on 7 January 1828 and had only been working for a few months when on 21 April it was decided to transfer it to the Bolton and Leigh Railway, which was to be opened in June. (Note: The Bolton and Leigh Railway opened on 1 August 1828.)

A second engine as a replacement, similar to the first, was being built in Stephenson's works during July 1828, when it was seen by visitors including Horatio Allen of the Delaware and Hudson Canal Company and the French engineers Coste and Perdonnet, who wrote one of the few contemporary engineering descriptions of it. The locomotive, later known as the Pride of Newcastle, was diverted to the DHC and shipped in October 1828. (Note: Some components, wheels and one cylinder, survive in the Smithsonian.)

A further locomotive was discussed on 16 March 1829 and arrived in mid-July. The intention was to use it to remove spoil from the 70 ft (21 m) deep Olive Mount cutting to the embankment constructed at Broad Green.

== Design ==
The Liverpool and Manchester Railway were required to ensure that the engines did not produce smoke. This was the first railway where this was a formal requirement, although experiments had already taken place to reduce the smoke from the boilers of stationary engines. Combustion engineering was in its infancy but it was already recognised that coal burned in two stages: gases were released from the coal, which gases could then be burned, and the solid coke matter remaining could also be burned in a separate process. Techniques used to achieve this could either involve gasification of the coal in situ in the furnace, or coking of the coal in a separate furnace beforehand. (Note: Although this separate processing might seem wasteful, this was the time of the adoption of street gas lighting and the town gas produced by coking was a valuable product for sale.)

A drawback to the use of coke was that the fire required a stronger blast on it, produced either by bellows, a fan or the blastpipe, or in Stephenson's term, the 'exarsting pipe'. Twin Sisters was designed from the outset to burn coke, this led to an alternative name for it as the Liverpool Coke Engine.

Stephenson's Lancashire Witch used twin furnaces to increase the heating surface area within the same length of boiler barrel, but the reason for Twin Sister's twin boilers is unclear; whether it was to do likewise, or simply because it was first built and tested as a smaller boiler, then duplicated. Booth's first attempt at a multitubular boiler was built at Laird's in Birkenhead and shipped to Newcastle, where Stephenson built a second and used them both on the one locomotive.

The rest of the design was conventional for a Stephenson locomotive of this time, with a number of features which had first appeared on Lancashire Witch. The overall weight of the Twin Sisters is not recorded, but may have been more than Lancashire Witch, indicated by the use of six wheels rather than four. These wheels were wooden, with wrought iron tyres, and all were sprung. (Note: The use of springs for steam locomotives was still in its infancy, owing to the difficulty of providing reliable springs that would not break under the load. George Stephenson had previously experimented with steam springs to avoid this.) Two inclined cylinders, of the same size and pattern as Witch, drove the end wheels, and thus through coupling rods to the others. There was a facility in the valve gear for expansive working.

Water was supplied pre-heated by large 'railway kettles' at stations alongside the track. This was then carried in a wooden barrel on the engine's tender and supplied to the boiler by a pump cylinder driven from the engine crosshead.

== Service ==
From mid-1829, Twin Sisters was used successfully for the line's construction.

The Rainhill Trials were held in October 1829. After this, Rocket was used on the construction of the line. Rocket was used on the Chat Moss section and Twin Sisters was used near Liverpool.

The LMR opened in September 1830. After the opening of the line, Twin Sisters continued in service for some time and was engaged in ballasting work until 1831. Twin Sisters was never part of the formal stock of the railway and thus one of the first examples of departmental stock. In February that year it was involved in a fatal accident at Liverpool Road station, the Manchester terminus of the line.

Twin Sisters was scrapped around December 1831. One of the cylinders was kept and used to drive a water pump at Manchester.

== Forman's Engine ==
In mid-1829, Stephenson's supplied two locomotives to plateways at ironworks in South Wales: William Forman's Penydarren Ironworks and Samuel Homfray's (Note: Son of the Samuel Homfray who had employed Richard Trevithick, at Penydarren, to build his first successful steam locomotive.) Tredegar Ironworks. These had works numbers 14 and 16 and were both recorded in Stephenson's log books on 18 July 1829.

The Forman locomotive was designed, like the Twin Sisters, with two vertical boilers, although it was then built with a single-flue horizontal boiler. An initial drawing of July 1828 showed a horizontal boiler, but by the time it was ordered in December, a drawing shows it with the twin boilers. The wheels were 3 ft (910 mm) and the cylinders 7 in × 20 in (180 mm × 510 mm), smaller than those of Twin Sisters but otherwise similar with six wheels and inclined cylinders.

The second locomotive was shipped to South Wales on the same ship, on 18 July 1829, and this has led to some confusion between the two. The Tredegar locomotive, named Britannia, used Stephenson's first return-flue boiler.

After two years of successful service, Forman's engine was returned to Newcastle and rebuilt, with a new multi-tubular boiler built from the original boiler barrel, and re-gauged to 4 ft 6 in (1,372 mm).
