= List of acts of the Legislative Council of Western Australia from 1885 =

This is a list of acts of the Legislative Council of Western Australia for the year 1885.

== 1885 ==
Short title, or popular name	Citation	Royal assent
Long title
	49 Vict. No. 1	11 September 1885
An Act to provide for the Payment of certain additional and unforeseen Expenses in the year One thousand eight hundred and eighty-five, over and above the Estimates for that year.
	49 Vict. No. 2	
Brands Act 1881 Amendment Act 1885	49 Vict. No. 3	
Superannuation Act Amendment Act 1885	49 Vict. No. 4	
Eastern Railway Further Extension Act 1885	49 Vict. No. 5	18 September 1885
An Act to authorise the Further Extension of the Eastern Railway.
Colonial Passengers Amendment Act 1885	49 Vict. No. 6	
Imported Stock Amendment Act 1885	49 Vict. No. 7	
	49 Vict. No. 8	
Bush Fires Act 1885	49 Vict. No. 9	
	49 Vict. No. 10	
	49 Vict. No. 11	
Volunteer Foreign Service Act 1885	49 Vict. No. 12	
Law and Parliamentary Library Amendment Act 1885	49 Vict. No. 13	
Municipal Councils Titles Act 1885	49 Vict. No. 14	
Destruction of Rabbits Amendment Act 1885	49 Vict. No. 15	
Explosives Act 1885	49 Vict. No. 16	
Municipal Institutions Act 1876 Amendment Act 1885	49 Vict. No. 17	
Gun License Act 1885	49 Vict. No. 18	
Perth Church of England Collegiate School Act 1885 or the Perth Anglican Church of Australia Collegiate School Act 1885	49 Vict. No. 19	24 September 1885
An Act to Dissolve the Corporation of "The Governors of the Perth Church of England Collegiate School," and for other purposes.
	49 Vict. No. 20	
Scab Act 1885	49 Vict. No. 21	
Customs Act 1885	49 Vict. No. 22	
Tramways Act 1885	49 Vict. No. 23	
Federal Council (Adopting) Act 1885	49 Vict. No. 24	
	49 Vict. No. 25	24 September 1885
An Act to appropriate the sum of Two Hundred and Seventy-seven Thousand One Hundred and Seven Pounds Eleven Shillings and Five Pence out of the General Revenue of the Colony for such Services as shall come in course of payment during the year One thousand eight hundred and eighty-six.

== Sources ==
- "legislation.wa.gov.au".
