= Swan View railway station =

Former railway station in Western Australia

Coordinates: 31.8872°S 116.0604°E

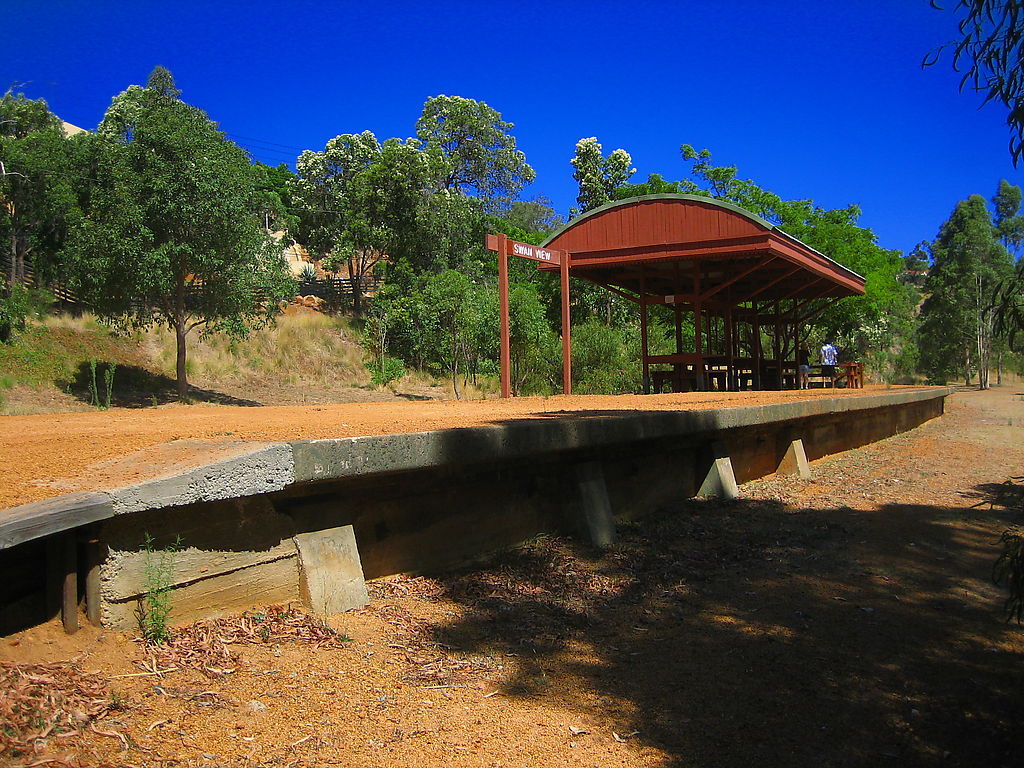
Swan View railway station

Swan View railway station was a railway station of significance on the Eastern Railway in Western Australia. In all working timetables during the operation of this line, the station was the point of control for the Swan View Tunnel.

The Bellevue to Chidlow railway line involved the encounter with the Darling Scarp requiring extra power for the up line, and considerable extra caution for the up and down lines.

The station master's house was adjacent to the station.

Due to the volume of traffic passing through, various accidents were regular either at the station or in the vicinity, also being near the tunnel, some tunnel related accidents were reported with the station as context.

The station was closed in 1966 at the time of the Avon Valley rail route being opened, and the old Eastern Railway route became superfluous to Western Australian Government Railways (WAGR) needs.

For almost 50 years the major curve between this railway station and the Swan View Tunnel was the main location for photographs for tourism brochures and promotional picture of new rolling stock and locomotives, as well as the main named train of the WAGR – The Westland.

Since the closure and removal of the railway line, and the development of the Railway Reserves Heritage Trail the Swan View station site is one of the very few on the trail to have the railway platform retained (for instance – Mundaring and Darlington).
