= Windmill Hill Cutting =

Deep railway cutting on the Eastern Railway near Toodyay, Western Australia

Coordinates: 31°35′S 116°30′E

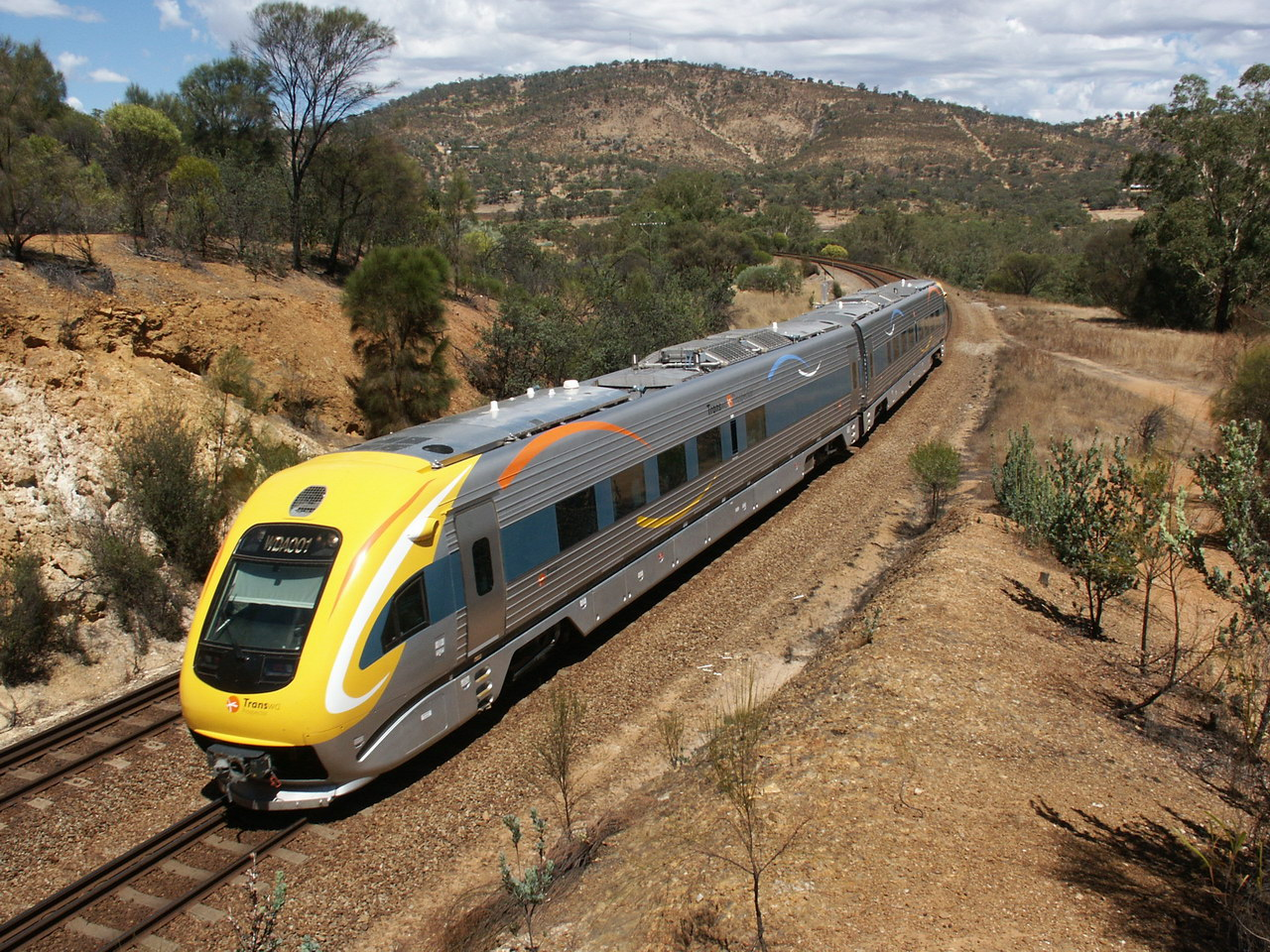
Prospector railcar WDA001 on the approach to Windmill Hill Cutting (February 2004).

Windmill Hill Cutting is a large cutting on the dual gauge railway east of Toodyay in Western Australia. The cutting was constructed between 1963 and 1964 for the Eastern Railway route through the Avon Valley, and is part of the interstate standard gauge railway connecting Perth with the rest of Australia. About 3 million cubic metres (110 million cubic feet) rocks were excavated, making the project a major one.

At the eastern end of the valley, Leighton Contractors Ltd. began work on three large cuttings near Toodyay. At the Windmill Hill, where it had been planned to bore a tunnel, they had to drill and blast through solid granite rock to a depth of almost 35 metres. Nearly half a million tons of rock were to be moved, yet only thirty men and a few large machines were used.

The route became operational in February 1966. The lookout point for the cutting has a plaque that claims one of the deepest in Australia, with the depth at 35 metres (115 ft) and length as 175 metres (574 ft). The Avon Valley cuttings had also uncovered sections of unstable rock, and effort was made to fix walls where required.

Due to the size of the cutting, the underlying geology is exposed to give a clear exposure of rock formations. It was nominated as a geological heritage site in the 1990s.

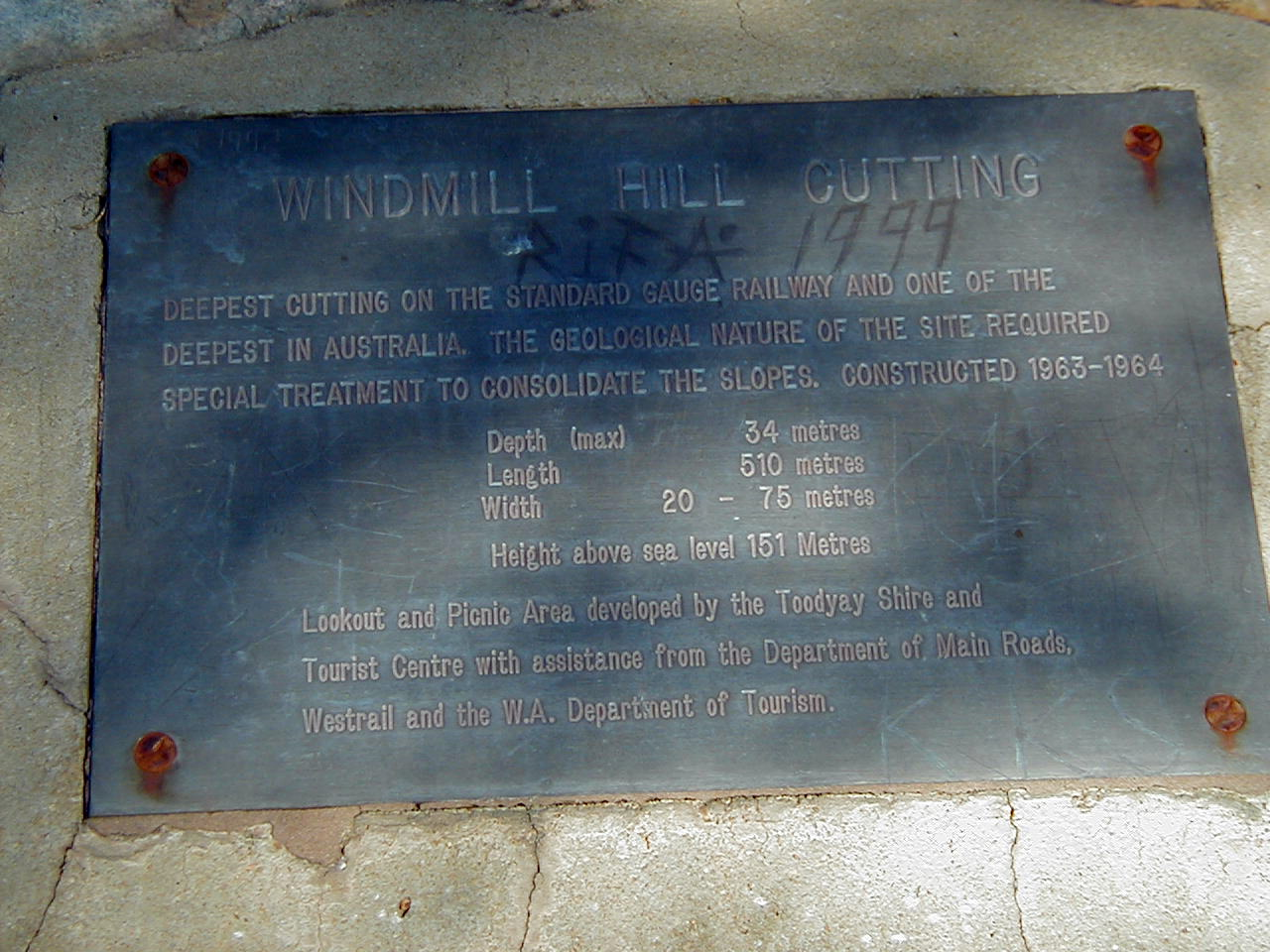
Plaque at lookout

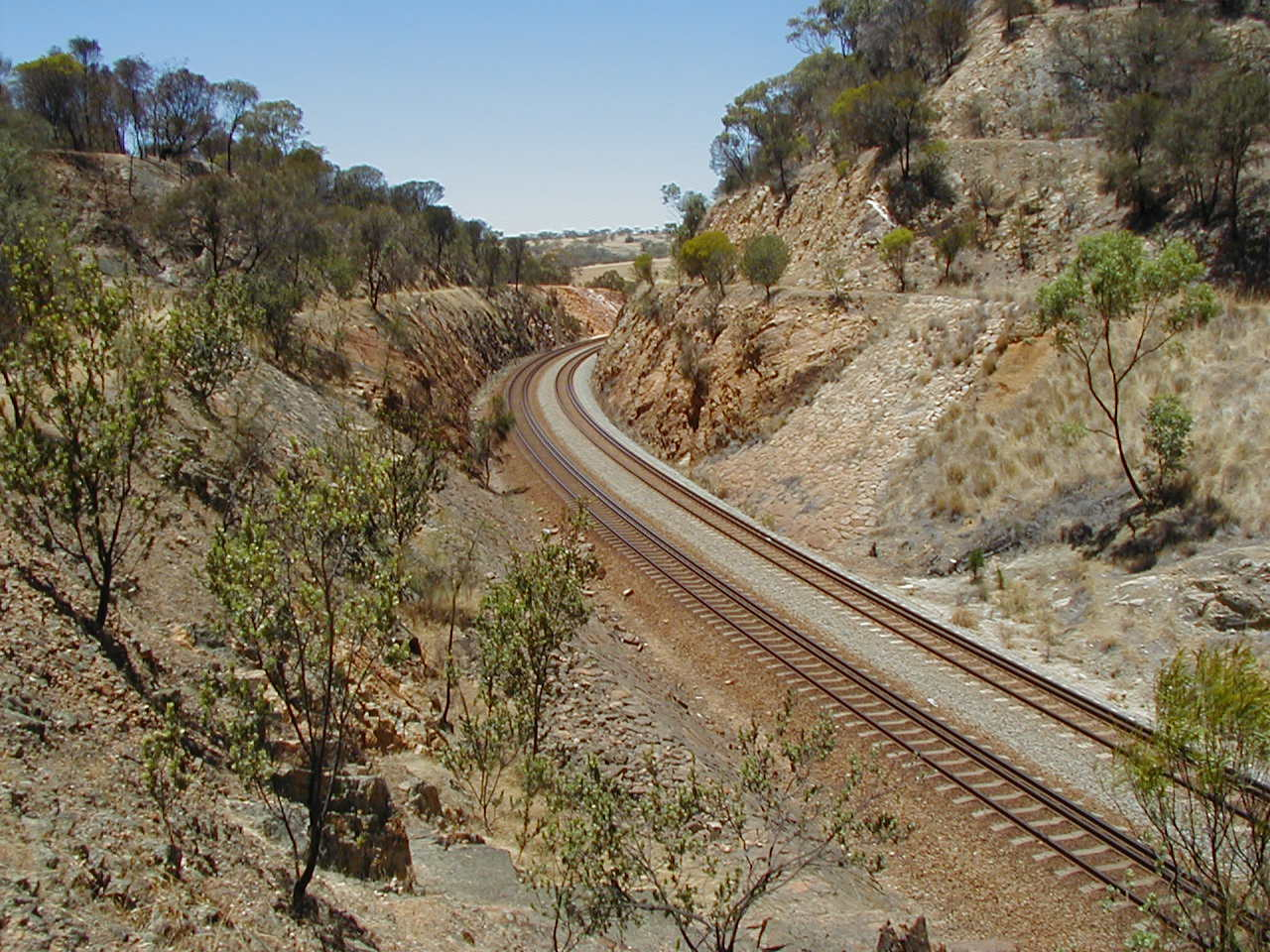
Looking east towards Northam

== See also ==
- Railway cutting
