= Cut (earthworks) =

Location where earth is removed to make way for a road, railway, or canal

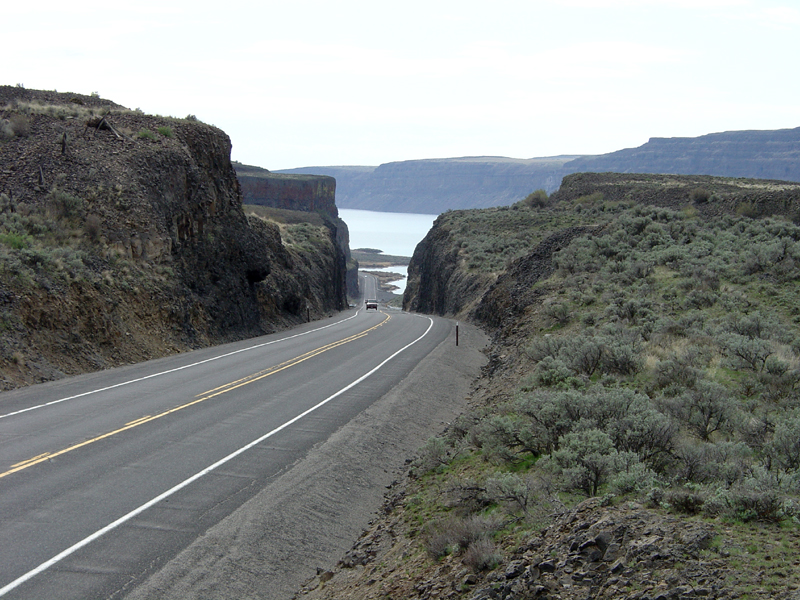
Road cutting

In civil engineering, a cut or cutting is where soil or rock from a relative rise is removed.

Cuts are typically used in road, rail, and canal construction to reduce a route's length and grade. Cut and fill construction uses the spoils from cuts to fill in defiles to create straight routes at steady grades cost-effectively.

Cuts are used as alternatives to indirect routes, embankments, or viaducts. They also have the advantage of comparatively lower noise pollution than elevated or at-grade solutions.

In river and smaller watercourse management, both terms are used likewise, the short-cutting of one or more meanders, to speed its flow. Greater and recent examples are often formally suffixed Navigation (more flow-controlled) or a new name of river, whether a navigation, such as the Jubilee River which is a navigation only in part and only for canoes and kayaks. Finally, in the context of lowlands, a drain, freshwater sewer, or dyke, otherwise called a cutoff (especially in the Mississippi River Delta), often equally acts as land drainage for a very low gradient, tidal estuary or for a flood-prone formerly extensive marshland.

== History ==
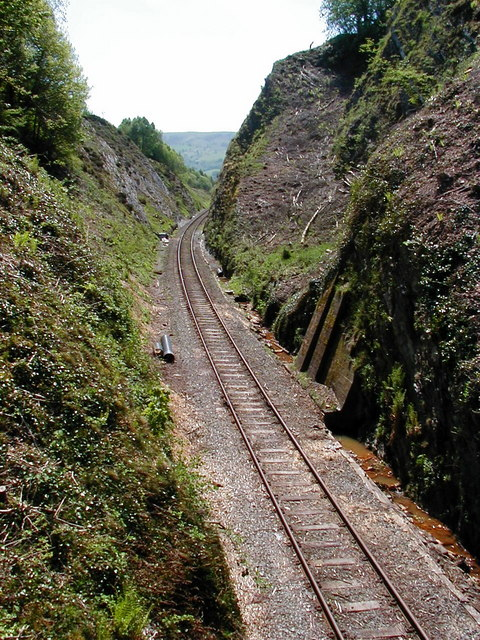
Talerddig cutting through the granite Cambrian Mountains, Wales in 2001. Created as part of the Newtown and Machynlleth Railway, with a depth of 120 feet (37 m), it was the deepest cutting in the world at the time of its opening in the early 1860s. The original nearly-vertical sides have since been trimmed back.

The term cutting appears in the 19th century literature to designate rock cuts developed to moderate grades of railway lines. Railway Age's Comprehensive Railroad Dictionary defines a cut as "a passage cut for the roadway through an obstacle of rock or dirt."

== Creation ==
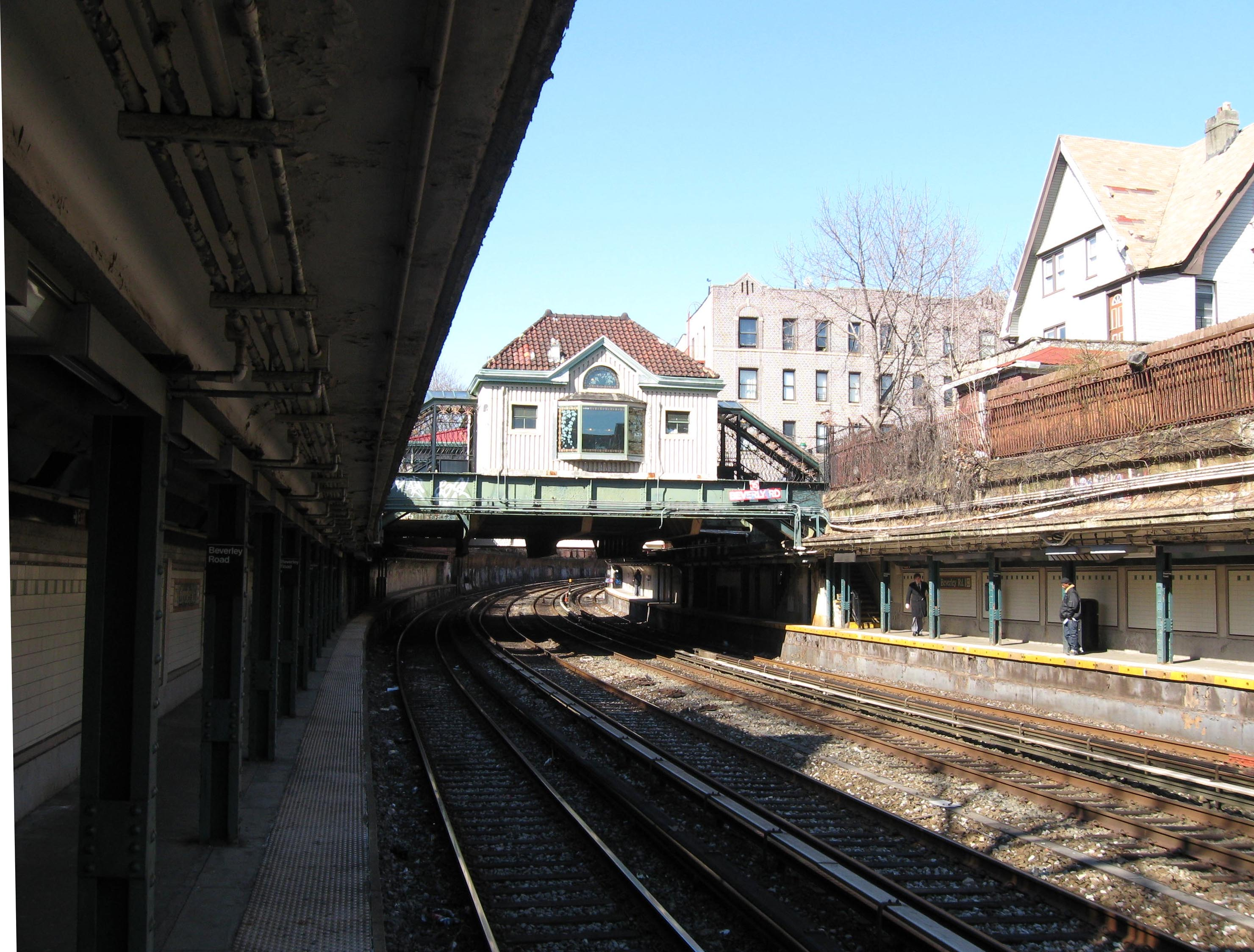
Open-cut station of the New York City Subway

Cuts can be created by multiple passes of a shovel, grader, scraper or excavator, or by blasting. One unusual means of creating a cut is to remove the roof of a tunnel through daylighting. Material removed from cuts is ideally balanced by material needed for fills along the same route, but this is not always the case when cut material is unsuitable for use as fill.

The word is also used in the same sense in mining, in particular open-pit mining. The use of cuttings often provides byproducts as a form of mineral extraction, commonly sand, clay or gravel; the cost of building drains, reinforcing banks against landslide and a high water table are factors which commonly limit its use in certain areas.

=== Types of cut ===
There are at least two types of cut, sidehill cut and through cut. The former permits passage of a transportation route alongside of, or around a hill, where the slope is transverse to the roadway or the railway. A sidehill cut can be formed by means of sidecasting, i.e., cutting on the high side balanced by moving the material to build up the low side to achieve a flat surface for the route. In contrast, through cuts, where the adjacent grade is higher on both sides of the route, require removal of material from the area since it cannot be dumped alongside the route.

A ledge is a cut in the side of a cliff well above the bottom of a gorge.

==== Lock cut ====
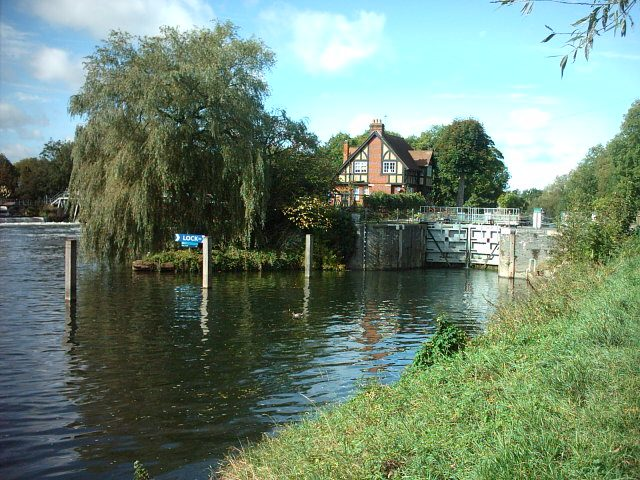
A lock cut on the River Thames at Bray Lock, Berkshire. The tall wooden poles are designed for boats to tie on to while awaiting entry into the lock.

A lock cut is a section of a river or other inland waterway immediately upstream and downstream of a lock which has been modified to provide locations for boats to moor while waiting for the lock gates to open or to allow people to board or alight vessels.

== Notable cuts ==
=== Canal ===
- Culebra Cut (Gaillard Cut) on the Panama Canal
- Dawesville Cut
- Corinth Canal

=== Rail ===
==== Asia ====
- Hellfire Pass, Thailand

==== Americas ====
- Bergen Hill Cut and Bergen Arches, New Jersey
- Duffy's Cut, Pennsylvania

==== Australia ====
- Big Hill Cutting, New South Wales
- Windmill Hill Cutting, Western Australia

==== Europe ====
- Archaeological site of Atapuerca, Spain

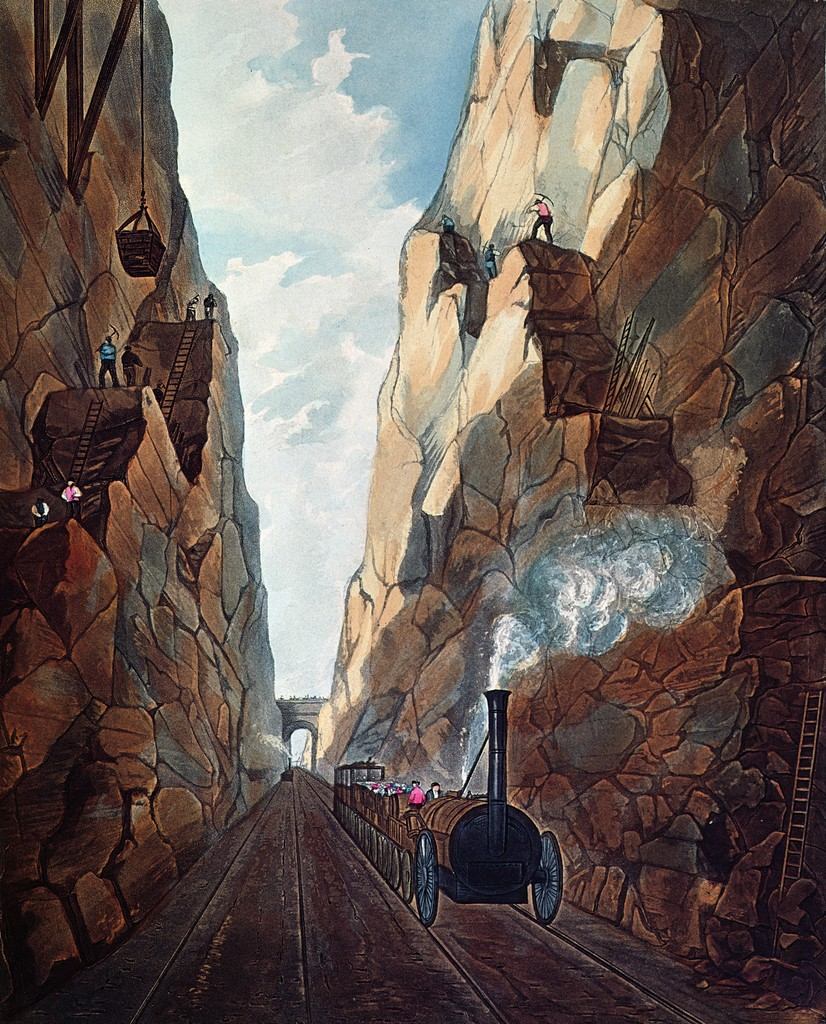
Excavation of Olive Mount cutting, Liverpool. Watercolour by T. T.Bury (1833) The cutting was 20 ft (6.1 m) wide and 70 ft (21.3 m) deep. Construction required the removal of 480,000 cubic yards (370,000 m^{3}) of sandstone.

- Olive Mount cutting, Liverpool, England
- Talerddig cutting, Wales

=== Road ===
- New Jersey Route 495 through Union City, New Jersey
- Pikeville Cut-Through on U.S. Route 23 in Kentucky
- Sideling Hill Cut on I-68

== See also ==
- Cut-and-cover
- Dashrath Manjhi
- Kamakura's Seven Entrances
- Embankment (transportation)
- Flying arch, use of a dummy arch bridge to stabilise cutting walls against landslip (landslide)
- Trench
