= Swan View Tunnel =

Former railway tunnel in Swan View, Western Australia

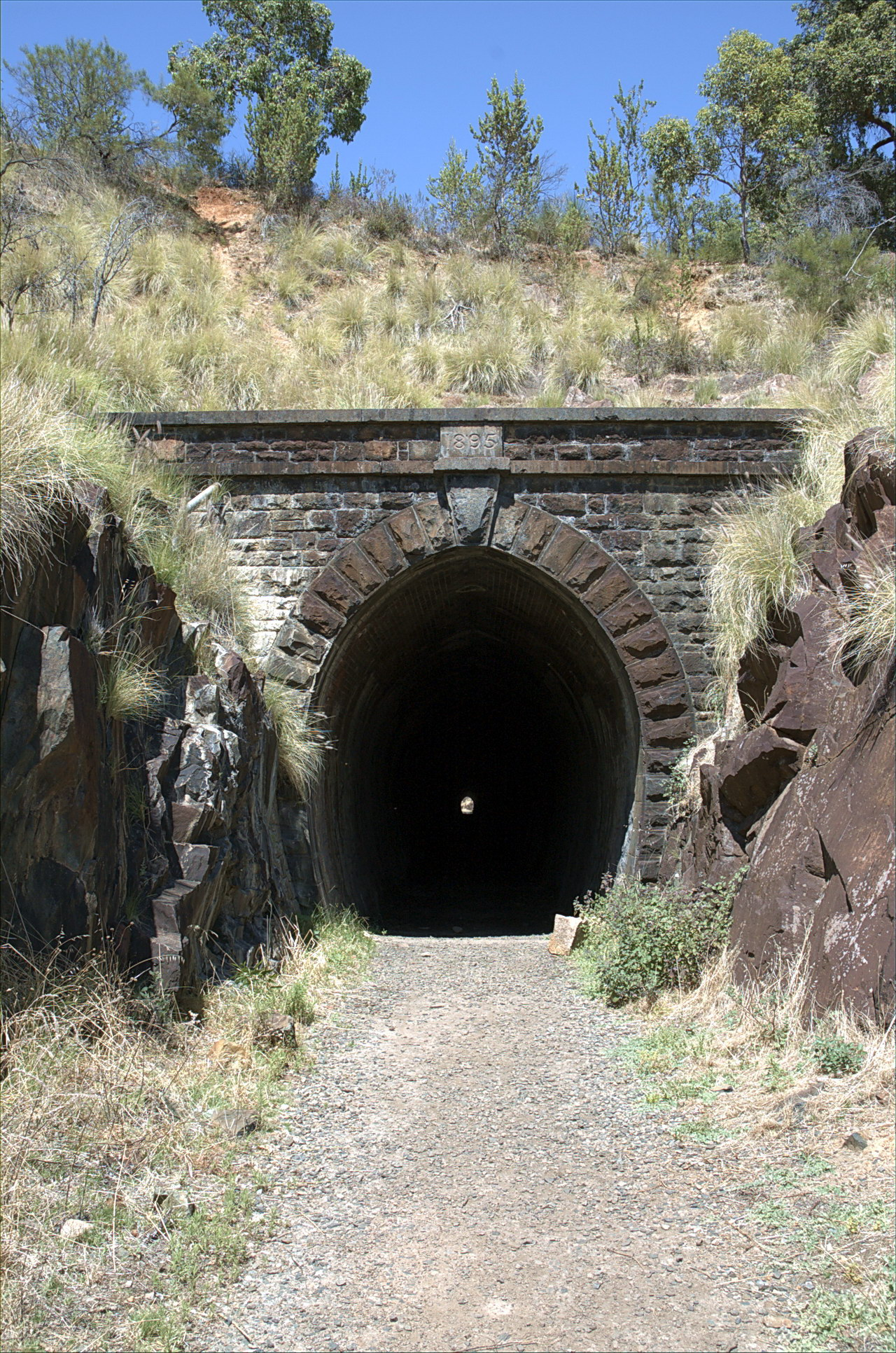
- Eastern portal in January 2006
- Interactive map of Swan View Tunnel

Overview
- Location: Swan View, Western Australia
- Coordinates: 31°52′59.3″S 116°4′10.3″E
- Status: Converted to rail trail
- Start: 31°52′56.1″S 116°4′15.5″E
- End: 31°53′2.8″S 116°4′5.0″E

Operation
- Opened: 22 February 1895
- Closed: 13 February 1966
- Owner: Department of Parks & Wildlife
- Operator: Western Australian Government Railways

Technical
- Line length: 340 m (1,120 ft)
- No. of tracks: 1
- Track gauge: 1,067 mm (3 ft 6 in)

The Swan View Tunnel is a former railway tunnel located on the southern side of the Jane Brook valley in the outer Perth suburb of Swan View in the John Forrest National Park on the edge of the Darling Scarp. After its closure as a railway tunnel, it reopened as part of the John Forrest Heritage Trail, a rail trail.

Prior to the construction of tunnels and the sinking of the Subiaco railway station in 1999, the Swan View Tunnel was the only tunnel on the Western Australian railway network.

== Construction ==
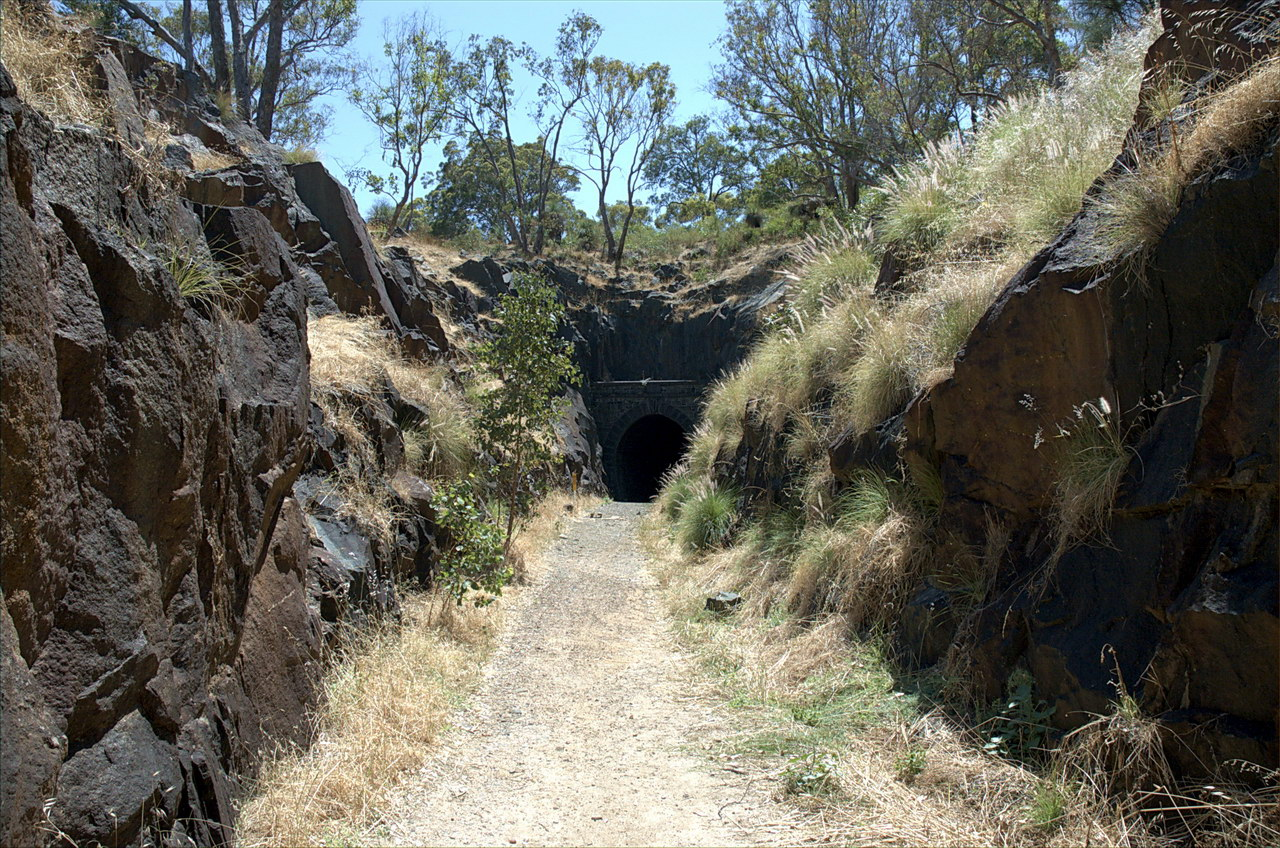
Western portal in January 2006

Swan View Tunnel was built on an alignment which replaced the original Eastern railway line passing through Smiths Mill, now Glen Forrest, and Mundaring. The project to build the new line, including the Swan View Tunnel, was managed by the Western Australian Government Railways Engineer-in-Chief, Charles Yelverton O'Connor.

The tunnel was erroneously stated in contemporary reporting to be 13 chains long, which is 262 metres (860 ft). Modern authorities give the length as 340 metres (1,120 ft).

Initial exploratory surveys of the new Jane Brook deviation were commissioned in 1891 by O'Connor. The aim was to find a route over the Darling range to replace the one-in-30 ruling grade existing section in the Helena Valley.

In 1892, O'Connor recommended to the first Minister for Railways in Western Australia, Harry Venn, that a Jane Brook option be selected. His advice was not followed, with an alignment adopted that followed the Jane Brook Valley until a large granite hill was encountered, requiring a drill and blast tunnel to penetrate through the hill. The successful tender for the tunnel construction came from a South Australian firm, Smeaton & Hedges.

The tendered price was £47,608, equivalent to A$7.73 million in 2022, with an expected completion time of 12 months. The engineer in charge of construction was John Muir who had also surveyed the prospective new route, designed the tunnel, and identified that broken rock spoil from the tunnel could be used to create nearby embankments, a prudent move on Muir's part as the principal means of shifting spoil in the 1890s was by draft horse hauling mould board and plough, followed by tipping from horse drawn carts.

Work began in 1894, with tunnelling operations commencing from each end and the two tunnel drives meeting on 18 April 1895. The tunnel opened on 22 February 1896, significantly over-budget and over-schedule. The unstable nature of the jointed and sheared granite, along with clay seams, caused difficulties during construction of the tunnel. Multiple rock falls occurred, which required further excavation at considerable cost. Because of the likelihood of further rock falls, the tunnel had to have masonry walls and was fully brick-lined with over 330,000 bricks, increasing construction time and costs and reducing the inner tunnel diameter.

The deviation from the original railway line, and the tunnel in particular, was a significant technical feat for the time; Engineers Australia awarded the deviation an Engineering Heritage Marker as part of its Engineering Heritage Recognition Program.

=== Problems ===
The tunnel was feasible for 1890s style locomotion, with some problems from smell and smoke accumulation, however the advent of larger, more powerful steam locomotives soon exposed the limitations of the tunnel. The tunnel's small diameter combined with the steep gradient (1:49), lack of ventilation shafts and typical requirement for 2 engines to haul heavily laden trains up the steep gradient caused smoke accumulation. Incidents involving near-asphyxiation of train crews started in 1896, and continued throughout the tunnel's operating life. Standard procedure for engine crews was to cover their heads with a water soaked hessian bag and to stay as low as possible on the footplate. The first serious incident of this nature was in 1903.

The tunnel's design was incompatible with the ASG class Garratt steam locomotives used by the Western Australian Government Railways in the 1940s. The subsequent Royal Commission into the ASG dealt with design of the locomotive, and the very dangerous clearances.

Industrial trouble arose in regard to the use of the ASG locomotives through the Swan View tunnel.

The worst accident in the tunnel was on 5 November 1942, when both drivers and firemen were overcome by carbon monoxide, one driver dying, when a fully laden double-header train passed through the tunnel at walking pace. A bale of chaff that had been poorly loaded on a previous train had fallen onto the track in the tunnel. When Number 97 goods train from Perth to Northam passed over the bale of chaff, it burst open, distributing chaff over the tracks. When the driving wheels passed over the chaff, the engines lost traction and stalled. The last act of the driver before the crews fell unconscious from smoke and carbon monoxide poisoning was to set the engines into reverse. Consequently the train steamed back down the line and crashed at Swan View station, with the death of driver Tom Beer. Further cases occurred in 1943 and 1944 on up trains.

Subsequent industrial strikes, a Royal Commission and union agitation for the locomotives' withdrawal was a significant issue in the 1940s.

== Deviation ==
Between 1934 and 1945, a signal cabin was located at Tunnel Junction, on the eastern end of the tunnel, for managing the transition from the tunnel's single line to the dual lines of the system.

The single line tunnel was considered unsafe for eastbound (climbing) trains. Following the events of the early 1940s, planning commenced immediately to alleviate the bottleneck caused by the tunnel. Several options were considered, including blasting the top off the tunnel and turning it into a cutting. However it was decided to create a sweeping deviation with a new cutting west of the tunnel, closer to Jane Brook, on the northern side of the hill that the tunnel passed through.

Construction commenced in 1944 with the deviation opened on 25 November 1945. Rockfall problems similar to, if not worse than, those of the tunnel were encountered during construction and severely restricted the subsequent use of the cutting.

Construction involved a deep cut in granite, some 450 metres (1,480 ft) long, in which protection from rock falls was essential in view of the character of the granite exposed after the cut had been excavated. Steel fences, 2.5 metres (8 ft 2 in) high with supports 9.9 metres (32 ft) apart, were therefore erected on both sides of the cut. The 16 wires forming the fences were in continuous electrical signalling circuits and a simple but effective system of internal electrical interlocking was installed which made the protection system completely automatic. If a wire was broken by falling rock or if a battery or circuit failed, two relays became de-energised, and the signal controlling the line in the cut was placed at danger. An indicator in the Swan Valley signal box showed the operator that a rockfall (or other failure) had occurred. The control signal could only be reset with a special key at the signal itself. The diversion was completed on 25 November 1945.

In 1956, the floor of the tunnel was lowered by 30 centimetres (12 in) with a concrete base laid.

== Closure ==
The railway line through the tunnel was lifted after the closing of the older and steeper Eastern Railway and the opening of the Avon Valley diversion that opened in February 1966. The new Avon Valley deviation route involved little rock work and flat gradients that had been initially favoured by O'Connor. Gates were put at either end of the tunnel though these were later removed.

The tunnel remains intact and has reopened as part of the John Forrest Heritage Trail, part of the larger Railway Reserve Heritage Trail. During the 1990s the Department of Environment & Conservation allowed a number of night time ghost walks in the tunnel as part of the Hills Forest programmes.

== Geology ==
The tunnel and first open cut deviation are constructed in Archaean meta-granite (slightly altered, coarse-grained granite, in places pegmatitic). This rock mass has been intruded by dolerite dykes which are more deeply weathered than the granites and in places active swelling clay (montmorillonitic) seams have formed.

The main structural problems come from a combination of shears and various types of jointing on the rock mass.

There are two sets of sub-vertical conjugate (formed at the same time) shears about 135° apart. These are expressed as bands of closely spaced fractures that have allowed water entry, in some places producing clay seams. In addition there are several types of joints:

1. sheet joints or stress relief joints, which are continuous and sub-parallel to the topography formed by the erosion of the deep valley adjacent
2. cooling joints, which are prominent in the intruding dolerite
3. tectonic joints
4. blast damage joints (rose of joints) caused by over-blasting

The net result is that a blocky rock mass has been produced with some vertical and sub-horizontal clay seams which allow rock falls, block gliding, rock slides and toppling type failures.

== Sources ==
- Higham, Geoffrey (2007). Marble Bar to Mandurah: A History of Passenger Rail Services in Western Australia (1st ed.). Bassendean: Rail Heritage WA. ISBN 978-0-9803922-0-3. OCLC 271545712. Wikidata Q140375689.
- Leggett, Robert Ferguson; Karrow, Paul Frederick (1983). Handbook of Geology in Civil Engineering. New York: McGraw Hill. ISBN 0-07-037061-3. LCCN 81017218. OCLC 1358646556. OL 4271052M.
- Wolff, Albert Asher (1946). Report of the Royal Commission Appointed to Inquire Into Australian Standard Garratt Locomotive (PDF) (Report). Perth: William H. Wyatt – via Parliament of Western Australia.

== General references ==
- Elliot, Ian (1983). Mundaring – A History of the Shire (2nd ed.). Mundaring: Mundaring Shire. ISBN 0-9592776-0-9.
- Watson, Lindsay (1995). The railway history of Midland Junction : commemorating the centenary of Midland Junction, 1895–1995. Swan View: L & S Drafting in association with the Shire of Swan and the Western Australian Light Railway Preservation Association. ISBN 0-646-24461-2.
