= Olive Mount cutting =

Railway cutting on the Liverpool-Manchester line in England

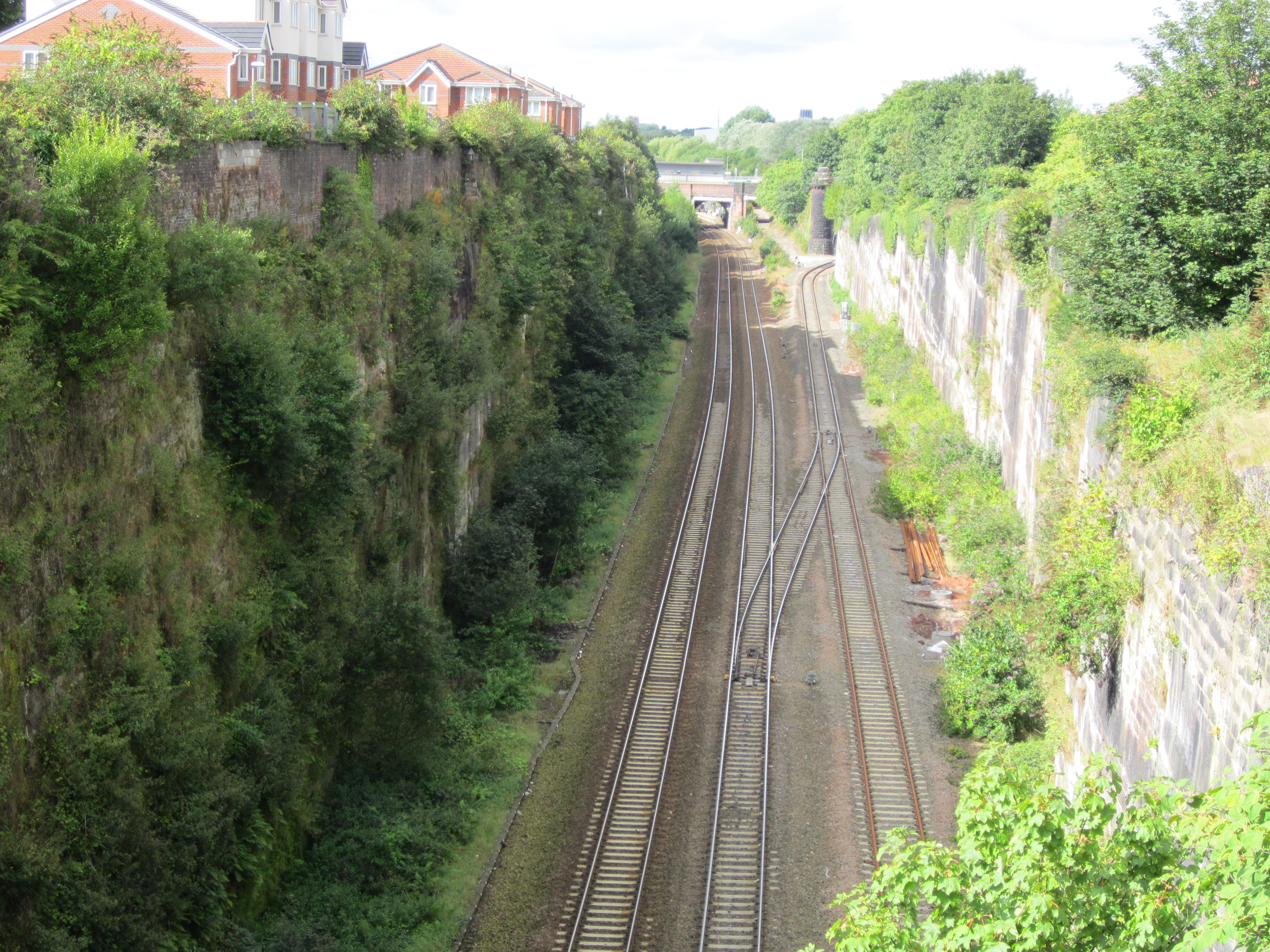
- The view towards Wavertree Technology Park railway station, with the junction to Olive Mount chord in the foreground.

Overview
- Status: Operational
- Owner: Network Rail
- Locale: United Kingdom (Liverpool; North West England)
- Coordinates: 53.4057°N 2.9127°W
- Stations: 0

History
- Opened: 1830

Technical
- Number of tracks: Double track with junction
- Track gauge: 1,435 mm (4 ft 8 1/2 in) standard gauge

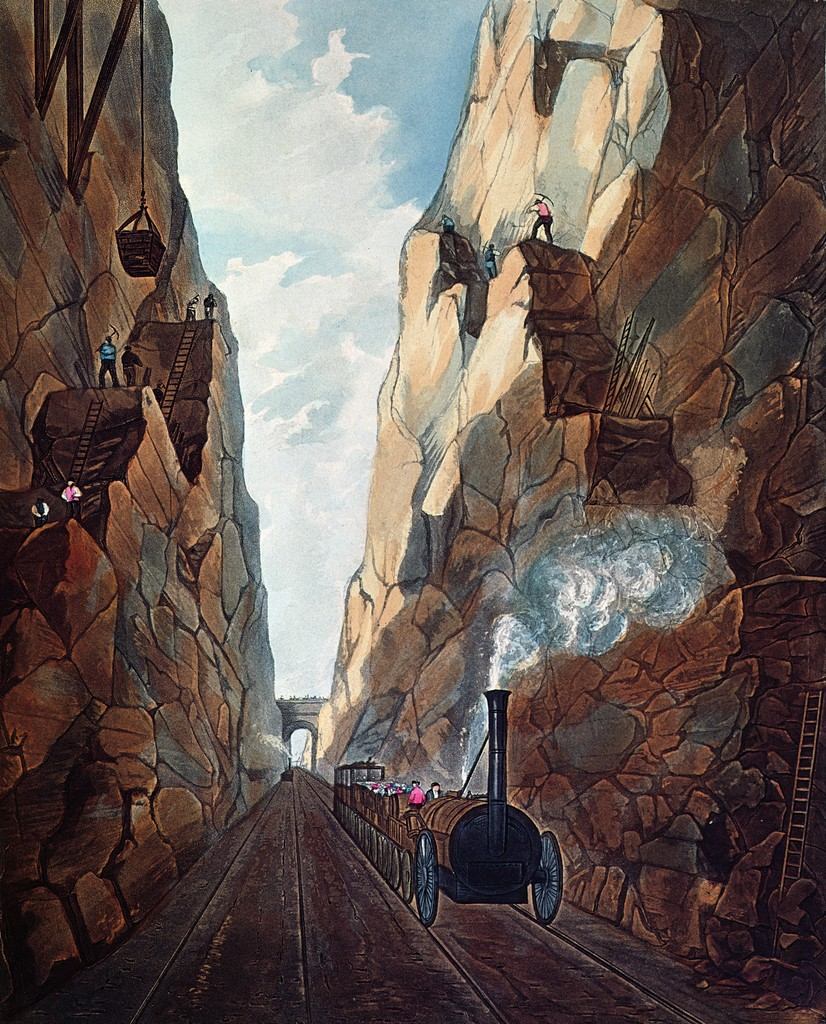
The excavation of Olive Mount, four miles from Liverpool.

Olive Mount cutting, which was opened in 1830, is a 2-mile (3.2 km) sandstone railway cutting on the line to Manchester, 4 miles (6.4 km) from Liverpool. The cutting is 80 feet (24 m) deep and is situated between Wavertree Technology Park and Broad Green railway stations. The railway's engineer, George Stephenson, had hoped to avoid the problem of creating the cutting for the Liverpool and Manchester Railway by routing the line further north. However, that plan was objected to by the Earl of Derby and the Earl of Sefton.

The cutting was originally designed to accommodate two tracks, and was only 20 feet (6.1 m) wide at the top. In 1871, it was widened to allow four tracks to enter Liverpool Lime Street, because traffic had increased considerably since the station opened.
