= John Forrest National Park =

National park in Western Australia

- IUCN category II (national park)
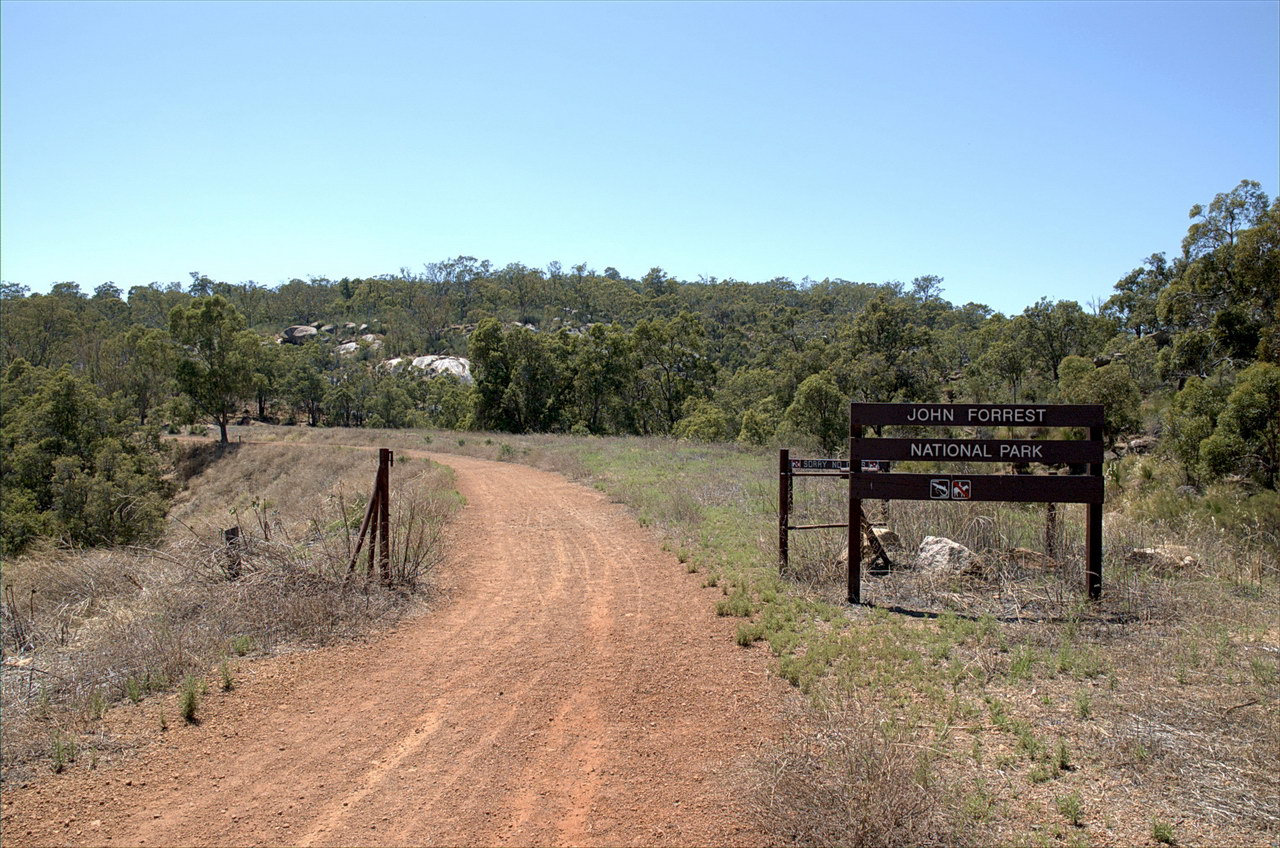
- National Park western entrance

- Location within Western Australia
- Location: Western Australia
- Nearest city: Perth
- Coordinates: 31°52′55″S 116°04′26″E
- Area: 26.78 km^{2} (10.34 sq mi)
- Established: 1957
- Governing body: Department of Biodiversity, Conservation and Attractions (Western Australia)
- Website: Official website

Western Australia Heritage Register
- Designated: 17 December 2004
- Reference no.: 8561

John Forrest National Park is a national park in the Darling Scarp, 24 km (15 mi) east of Perth, Western Australia. Proclaimed as a national park in November 1900, it was the first national park in Western Australia.

== Name ==
As early as 1898, the land was reserved for conservation and recreation. Two years later, it was named Greenmount National Park. It was still being identified as National Park in the late 1930s, and it was not until 1947 that the name change occurred to commemorate Sir John Forrest, the first Premier of Western Australia.

== Location ==
The park is on the edge of the Darling Scarp east of Perth, north of the Great Eastern Highway. To the west is the suburb of Swan View, with Pechey Road as a natural western boundary. To the south of the Great Eastern Highway the suburbs adjacent are Darlington and Glen Forrest. To the east is Hovea.

== History ==
It was bisected by the Eastern Railway when it was constructed in the 1890s and rail traffic passed through until 1966, when the line was closed due to the opening of the Avon Valley route.

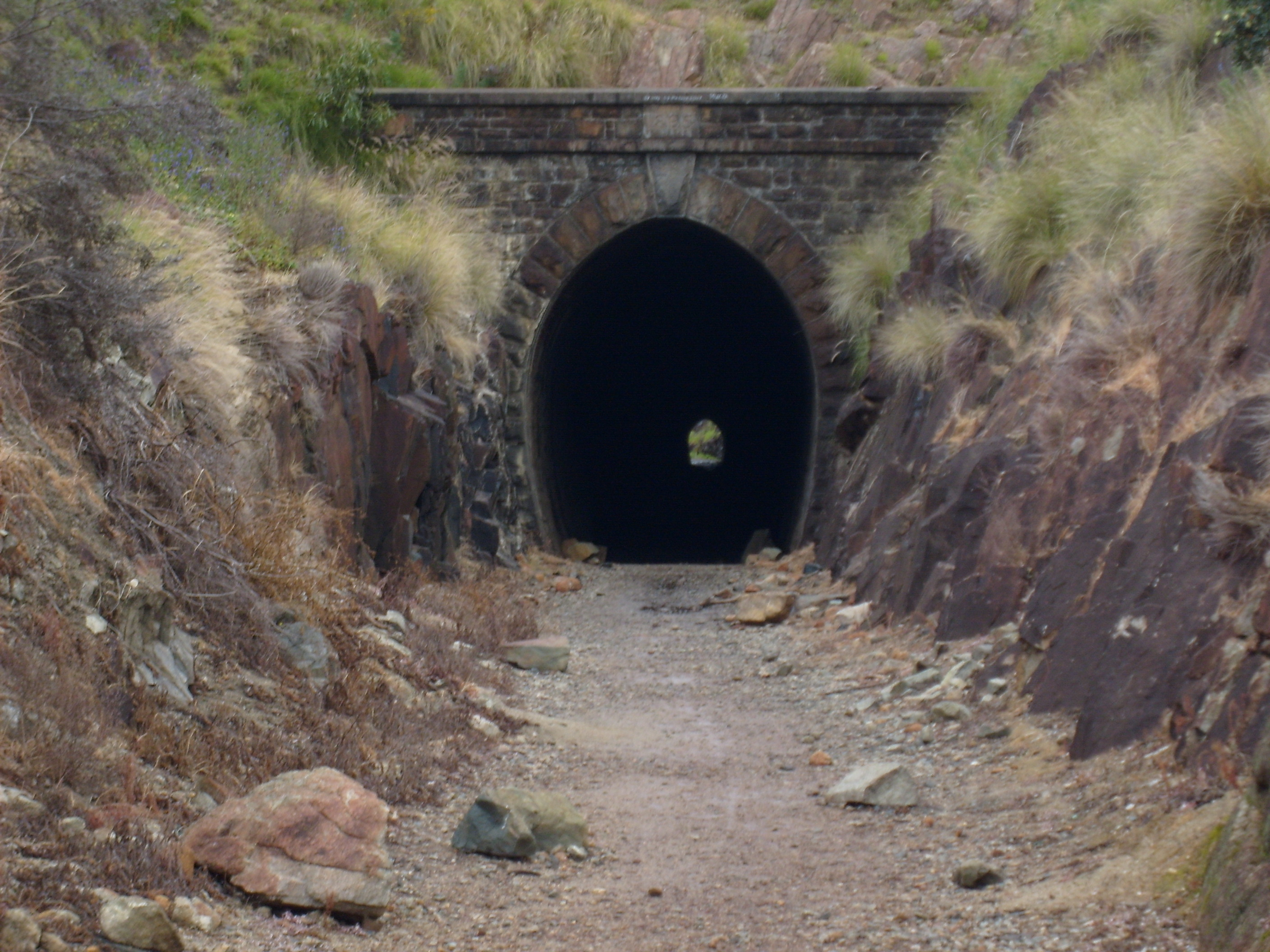
The Swan View Tunnel is located within the park

The alignment through the Swan View Tunnel and through the park was commonly known as the "National Park" railway line.

During the Great Depression of the 1930s many features near the main park buildings were built as part of relief employment. Some have been restored.

It was a popular railway excursion location while the railway was in existence (1890s to 1960s). Initially Hovea was the nearest railway station but in 1936 the National Park railway station was built. Also often photographed were National Park Falls, and the Hovea Falls.

After the railway line was closed and removed the formation became part of the Railway Reserves Heritage Trail vested in the Mundaring Shire Council. The section within the park is now known as the John Forrest Heritage Trail.

== Current conditions ==
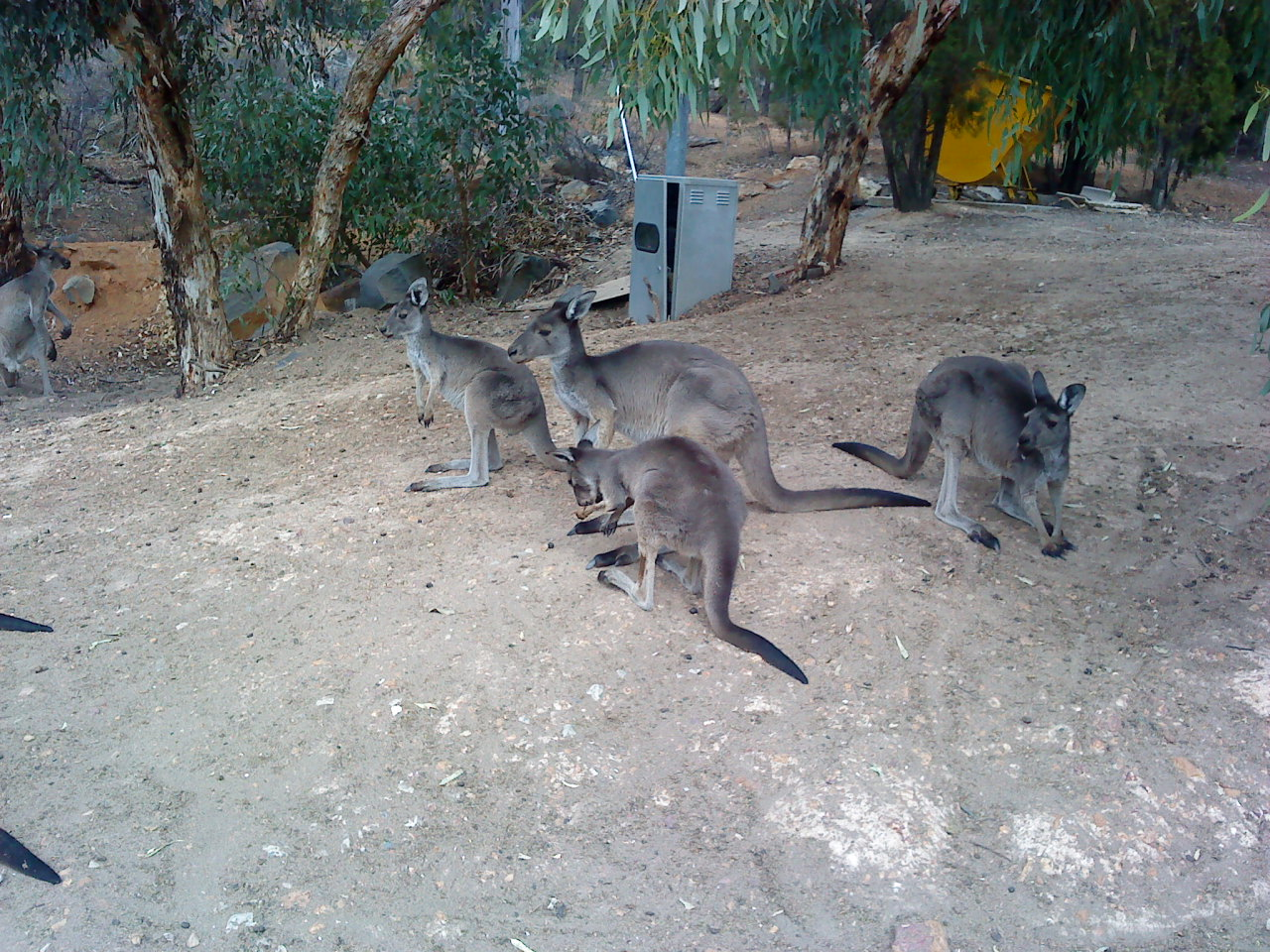
Kangaroos at John Forrest National Park

While larger kangaroos remain, significant populations of smaller marsupials have been devastated by foxes, feral cats and dogs in this park.

Drought and dieback have affected the jarrah forest within the park. At the edges of the park, introduced species of weed and problematic vegetation threaten the integrity of the park. In some areas wildflowers remain a feature to the edge of the internal roads despite the changes.

Also with rationalising of staff within the Department of Environment and Conservation management, earlier levels of staffing on parks such as this one have been reduced to minimal levels.

Significant damaging bushfires occurred in the western and northern sections of the park in the 1990s and early 2000s. In November 2010 a bushfire, believed to have been deliberately lit, damaged a significant area of the park including part of the Eagle's View trail.

At various stages parts of the park have been accessed by mountain bike activity.

== John Forrest Tavern ==
John Forrest Wildflower Tavern and Restaurant was opened in 1978. It was centrally located within the park just uphill from the ranger's office. It become a landmark for events such as car club rallies and orienteering clubs. The outside court yard was a popular tourist attraction as native birds and kangaroos, seeking food, approach close to the building.

The Department of Biodiversity, Conservation and Attractions closed the venue in 2022.

== Walking trails ==
John Forrest National Park has several walk trail options that cater for different abilities and fitness level. All walks start at the main picnic area. Walks include:

- Christmas Tree Creek Walk (10.5 km or 6.5 mi)
- Eagle View Walk Trail (16 km or 9.9 mi)
- Little Eagle Walk Trail (8.8 km (5.5 mi))
- Glen Brook Walk (2.2 km or 1.4 mi)
- Jane Brook Promenade (300 m or 980 ft loop)
- John Forrest Bridle Trail (15 km or 9.3 mi)
- National Parks Falls Walk (2.5 km or 1.6 mi)
- Wildflower Walk (4.5 km or 2.8 mi

== See also ==
- List of protected areas of Western Australia
