= Eastern Railway (Western Australia) =

Railway line in Western Australia

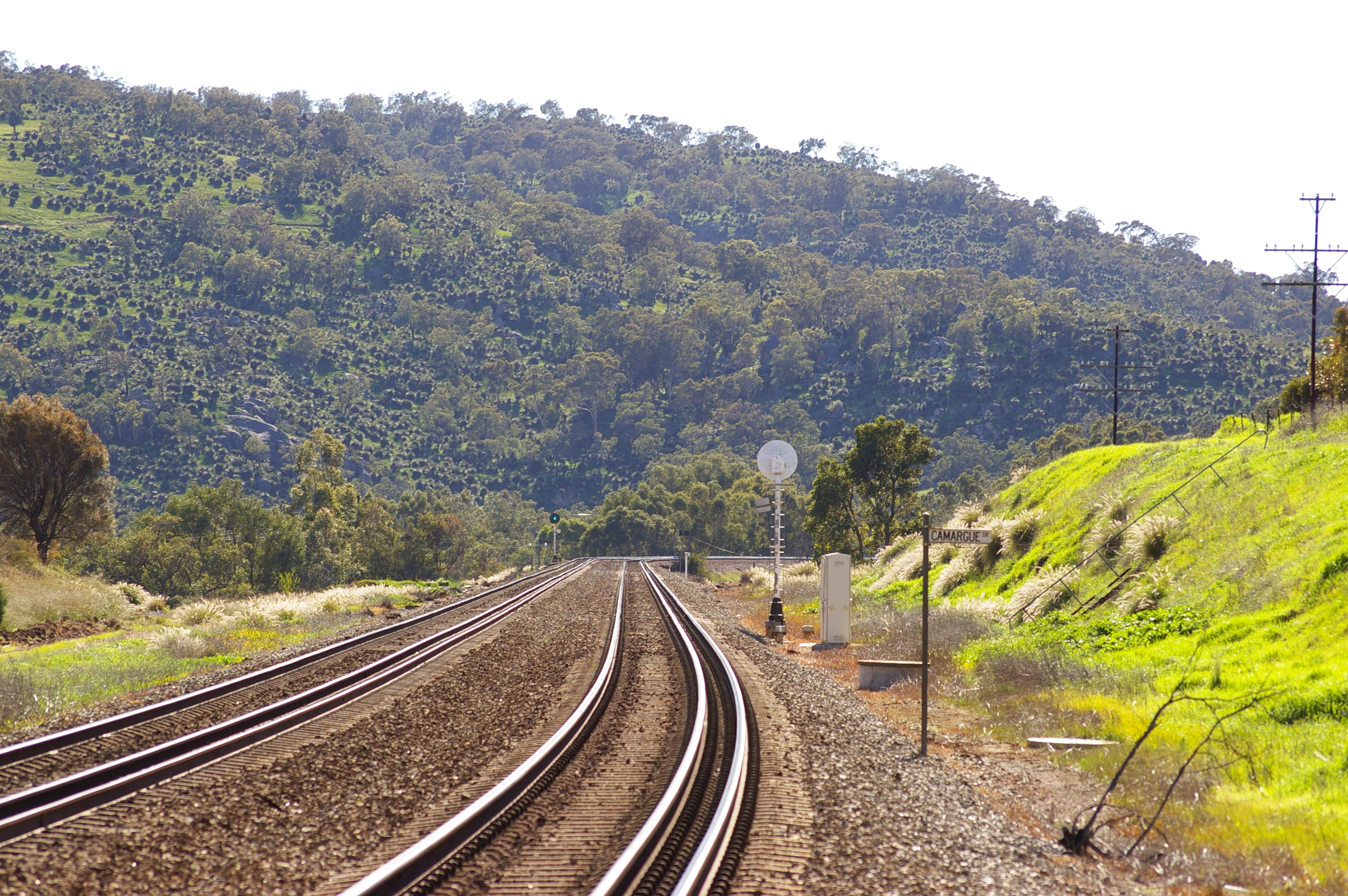
- Current line (third route) through the Darling Scarp

Overview
- Owner: Public Transport Authority; Arc Infrastructure
- Termini: Fremantle; Northam

Service
- Type: Heavy rail
- Operator(s): Aurizon; Pacific National; SCT Logistics; Transwa

History
- Opened: First Route; 1 March 1881 (Fremantle to Guildford); 11 March 1884 (Guildford to Chidlow); 20 June 1885 (Chidlow to Spencers Brook); 13 October 1886 (Spencers Brook to Northam); Second Route; 22 February 1896 (Bellevue to Mount Helena); Third Route; 14 February 1966 (Bellevue to Northam)

Technical
- Line length: 120 km (75 mi)
- Number of tracks: 2
- Track gauge: 1,067 mm (3 ft 6 in) and 1,435 mm (4 ft 8 1/2 in) (Dual gauge)
- Old gauge: 1,067 mm (3 ft 6 in)

The Eastern Railway is the main railway route between Fremantle and Northam in Western Australia. It opened in stages between 1881 and 1893. The line continues east to Kalgoorlie as the Eastern Goldfields Railway.

It is part of the interstate standard gauge railway between Perth and the rest of Australia.

== Initial section ==
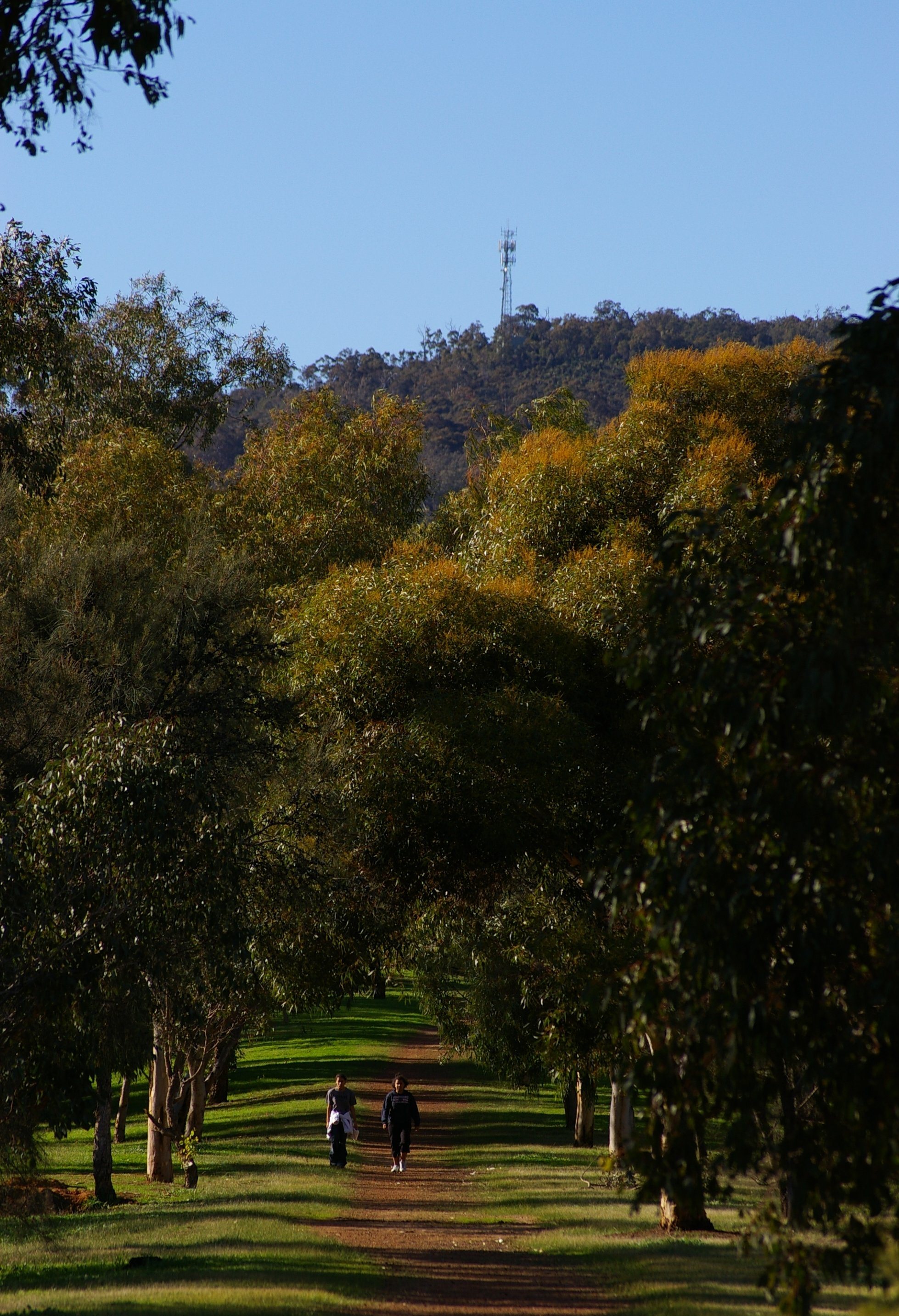
Eastern Rail reserve in Bellevue, looking east from near the site of the Bellevue station

The first sod of the Fremantle-Guildford Railway was turned by Governor Ord at Guildford on 3 June 1879. The event coincided with the celebration of the 50th anniversary of the settlement of Western Australia. The alignment of this first section of the railway has remained generally unchanged since it opened on 1 March 1881 and now forms part of Transperth's Fremantle Line and Midland Line.

Notable changes to this section include:

- Electrification of the Perth suburban rail network in 1991
- Sinking of Subiaco station in 1998 as part of Subi Centro
- Sinking of the line through the former Perth Yards as part of Perth City Link

The centenary of the railway was celebrated on 1 March 1981.

== First route ==
The First Route, from Guildford to Chidlow, was opened on 11 March 1884. The principal contractor of the works was J.W. Wright & Co. The route ascended the escarpment around Greenmount Hill passing through Boya, Darlington, Glen Forrest, Mundaring and Sawyers Valley before turning north to Mount Helena, originally known as White's Mill and then as Lion Mill. A significant delay in construction was experienced at a site that became popularly known as Devil's Terror - a location between Darlington and Glen Forrest. Clay was struck when a cutting was under construction followed by a subsurface spring. The resulting flooding turned the clay into a bottomless bog. The rail alignment had to be moved 100 metres south along the bed of Nyaania Creek, which was diverted into a specially constructed channel.

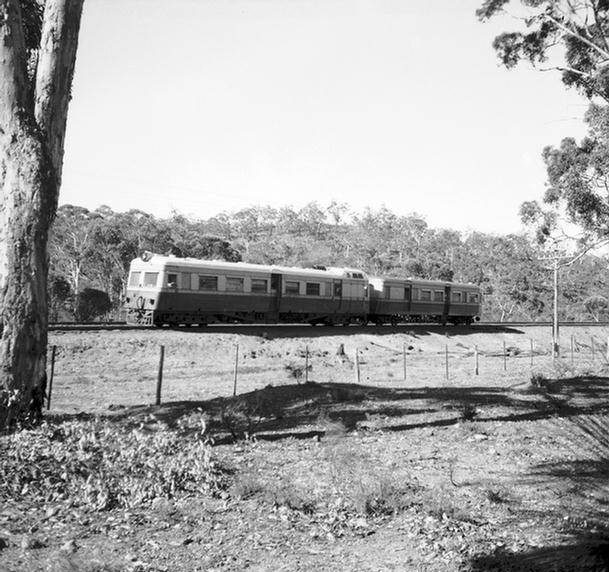
A Governor railcar operating a Katanning to Perth service near Clackline in 1944

A year after the opening of the line to Chidlow it was further extended to Spencers Brook, opening on 20 June 1885. The following year, it was extended again, opening to Northam on 13 October 1886. Both extensions were constructed by Edward Keane.

It soon became apparent that the section between Bellevue and Mount Helena was too steep for the increasingly heavier trains and engines required for the route. As a result, the Second Route was quickly devised in the 1890s. After the completion of this alternative section, the original line became known in Western Australian Government Railways (WAGR) records as the Smith's Mill Branch, then the Mundaring Branch, and later as the Mundaring Loop.

Passenger traffic ceased between Boya and on 24 January 1954 and the route was closed from Koongamia to Mount Helena on 12 March 1965.

Some remnants of this original line exist today:

- Koongamia - A small portion of the platform remains adjacent to Stuart Street.
- Darlington - The platform remains and forms part of a reserve. Nearby, remnant tracks are visible, set in Owen Road.
- Glen Forrest - One signal remains at the station site and the station master's house is used by the Darlington History Group.
- Mundaring - The platform and grounds have been turned into part of the Mundaring Community Sculpture Park and the station master's house is now the office of the Mundaring and Hills Historical Society.

== Second route ==
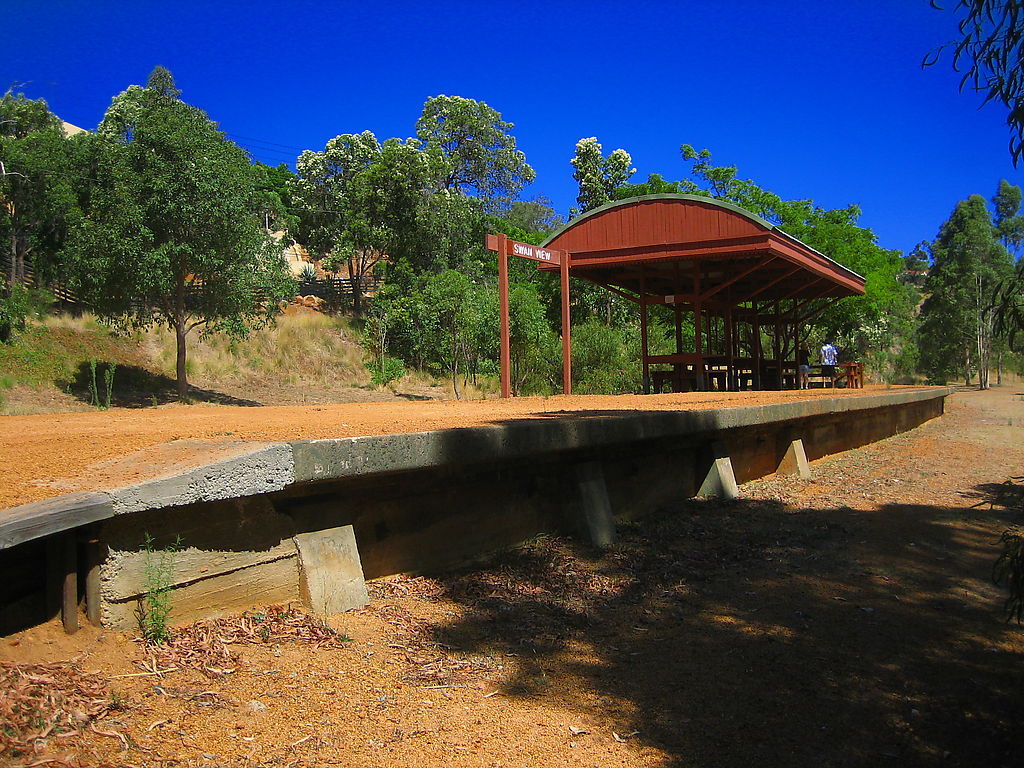
Swan View station in 2007

Also known as the Parkerville deviation or Mahogany Creek deviation, the Second Route via Swan View, John Forrest National Park, Hovea, Parkerville and Stoneville to Mount Helena, opened a little over a decade after the First Route, on 1 July 1896. It increased railway capacity to the east, while offering less demanding grades and improved safety compared to the alignment of the first route.

The line was originally only a single track, and featured Western Australia's first and, until 1990, only railway tunnel. Due to ventilation problems, in 1942 the tunnel was the cause of a runaway train crash, prompting calls for a fix. As traffic increased the newer route was duplicated in the 1930s, with the Tunnel Junction signal box established to manage traffic through the still single-track tunnel. A single-track diversion of the tunnel was completed on 25 November 1945, allowing trains heading uphill towards the east to avoid the tunnel and providing double-track operation along the entire line.

The Second Route closed on 13 February 1966, coinciding with the opening of the Third Route.

== Third route ==
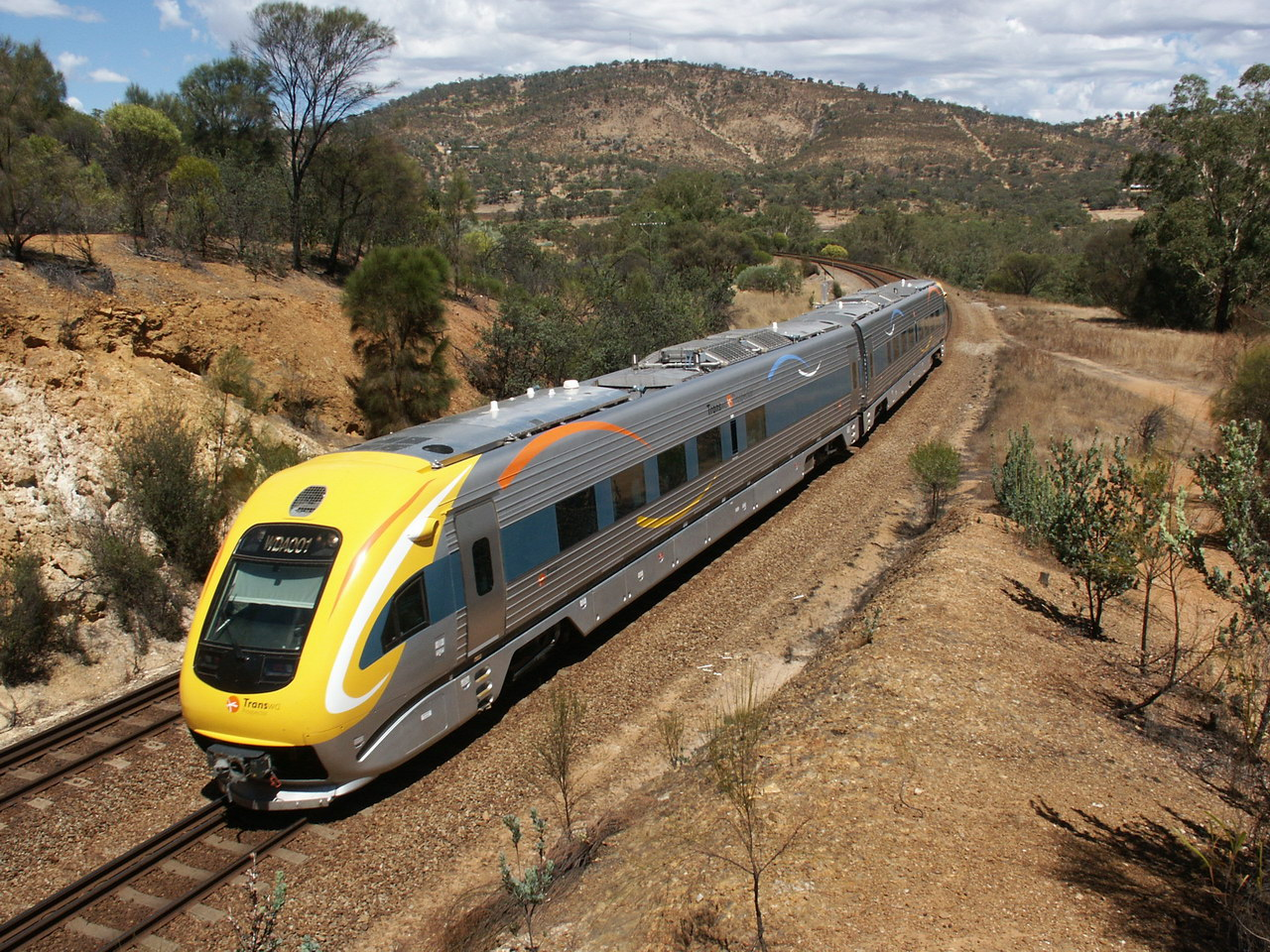
The Prospector at Windmill Cutting near Toodyay

The Third Route, also known as the Avon Valley Deviation, opened on 14 February 1966 and coincided with the closure of the earlier two routes of the Eastern Railway.

In the 1940s, it became clear to the Western Australian Government Railways that the original Eastern Railway alignments were not suitable for future traffic and the loadings that were to be carried between the coast and the areas east of the Darling Scarp.

As part of the federal government's program to build a standard gauge line across Australia, and the passing of the Railways (Standard Gauge) Construction Act 1961, work commenced on a new alignment further north through the Avon Valley, built with easier grades. This work also involved gauge-converting the remainder of the line as far as East Perth, as well as the Kwinana freight railway to dual gauge.

The Third Route was originally built with timber sleepers and 94 lb (42.6 kg) rail. It was later upgraded using heavy (60 kg or 132.3 lb) continuously welded rail laid on new concrete sleepers during the late 1970s through into the early 1980s and can now accommodate axle loads up to 41 tonnes.

The route, currently managed by Arc Infrastructure, is double-track line for almost its entire length and dual gauge (1,435 mm or 4 ft 8 1/2 in standard gauge and 1,067 mm or 3 ft 6 in narrow gauge) between East Perth and Avon Yard; tracks are narrow gauge-only at its western end through to Fremantle and standard gauge-only at its eastern end through to Northam. Crossing loops are provided there at three locations and these feature three parallel tracks. Numerous cuttings were also constructed, including the deep Windmill Hill Cutting east of Toodyay. Avon Yard, a major marshalling yard, is located five kilometres west of Northam.

== Current use ==
=== Passenger ===
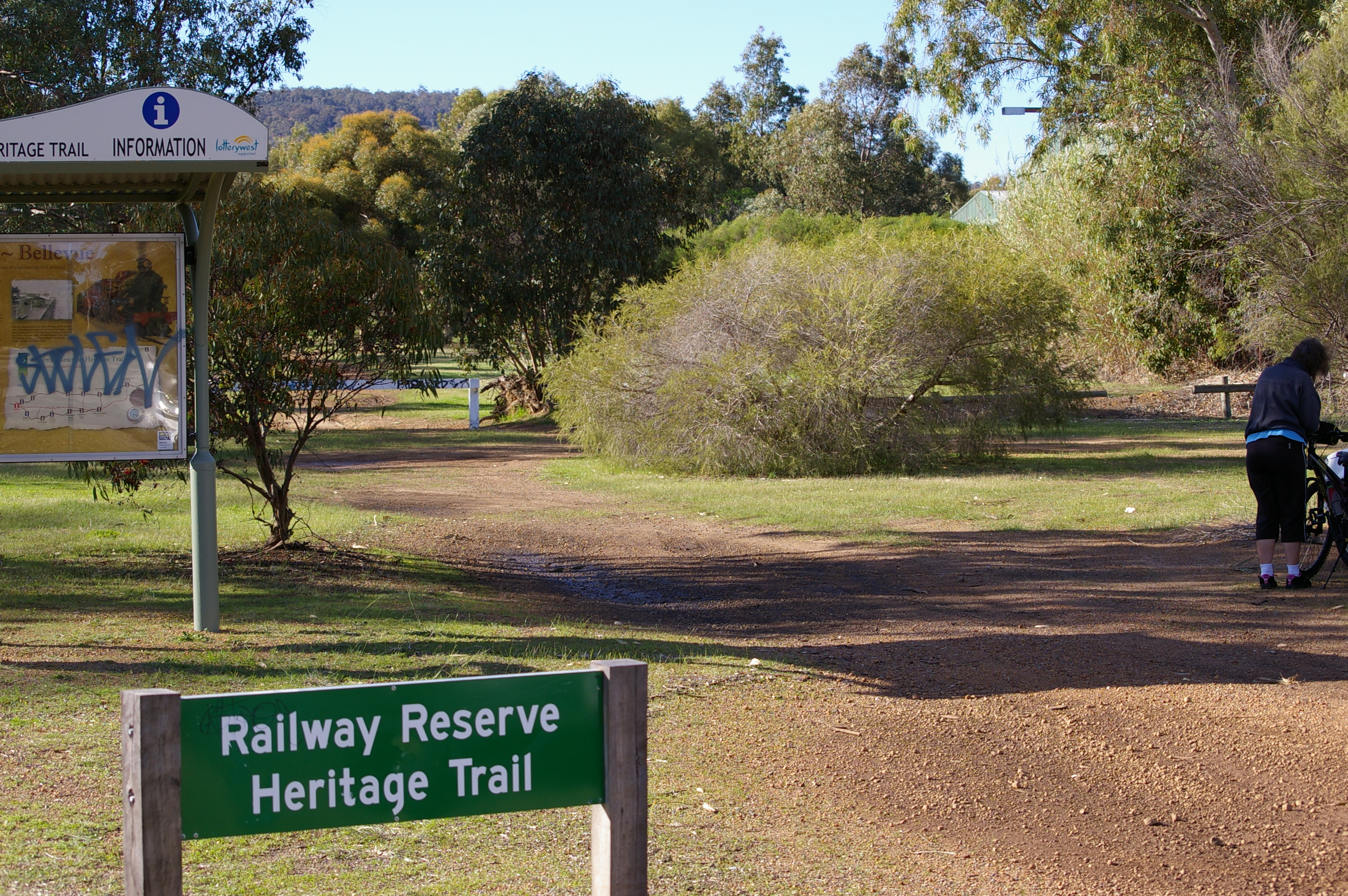
Cyclist preparing at the Bellevue end of the Railway Reserve Heritage trail

The original section from Fremantle to Guildford (and onwards to Midland) is still in use as part of Transperth's suburban passenger rail network. Transwa's AvonLink, MerredinLink and Prospector rail services use the line from East Perth to Northam, Merredin and Kalgoorlie. Journey Beyond also run the Indian Pacific luxury train to Sydney generally once a week.

Former named trains to previously traverse the line (predominantly the Second Route) were The Westland, The Kalgoorlie, The Mullewa, the Albany Progress and the Trans-Australian.

=== Freight ===
Intrastate freight services are generally operated by Aurizon. Interstate freight services are generally operated by Pacific National and SCT Logistics. Prior to privatisation, WAGR/Westrail operated all services on the line.

== Rail trails ==
The original Eastern Railway alignments still survive today, in the form of a rail trail for cycling, horse riding and walking. The sections from Bellevue to Wooroloo form the 'Rail Reserves Heritage Trail'. The section from Mundaring to Clackline, as well as the Mundaring Branch, form part of the Kep Trail.

The Railway Reserves Heritage Trail is the result of the Mundaring Shire Council being allocated funds from a number of external authorities to maintain and improve the old railway alignment as a rail trail. Between 2004–2006, the trail has had considerable signage and track maintenance conducted along the trail. It is also used for the annual Trek the Trail event conducted in conjunction between Mundaring and Hills Historical Society, the Mundaring Shire Council and the Mundaring Visitor Centre.

== Acts of Parliament ==
The following acts of Parliament relate to the construction and maintenance of the Eastern Railway:

- The Eastern Railway Act 1878 (42 Vict. No. 27), an act by the Western Australian Legislative Council and the Governor of Western Australia, Harry Ord, assented to on 24 July 1878, authorised the construction of the railway line from Fremantle to Guildford.
- The Eastern Railway Extension Act 1881 (44 Vict. No. 18), assented to on 7 April 1881, authorised the construction of the railway line from Guildford to Chidlow's Well.
- The Eastern Railway (Further) Amendment Act 1882 (46 Vict. No. 16), assented to on 21 September 1882, authorised the construction of the railway line from Chidlow's Well to York.
- The Eastern Railway Terminus Act 1883 (47 Vict. No. 9), assented to on 8 September 1883, authorised alterations to the terminus of the railway line at York.
- The Eastern Railway Further Extension Act 1885 (49 Vict. No. 5), assented to on 18 September 1885, authorised construction of the railway line from York to Beverley.
- The Eastern Railway, Spencer's Brook-Northam Branch Act 1886 (50 Vict. No. 3), assented to on 12 July 1886, authorised construction of the branch line from Spencer's Brook to Northam.
- The Eastern Railway Improvement Act 1893 (57 Vict. No. 29), assented to on 13 October 1893, authorised alterations to the railway line.
- The Eastern Railway Siding Act 1914 (No. 25), assented to on 22 September 1914, authorised the construction, maintenance and working of a siding at East Perth.
