= Helena Vale (disambiguation) =

Helena Vale may refer to:

- Helena Vale, Western Australia
- Municipality of Helena Vale, a former municipality in the Perth metropolitan area
- Helena Vale Racecourse, a former racecourse in Perth, Western Australia
- Helena Vale Brickworks, a former brickworks in Midland, Western Australia

== See also ==
- Helena Valley
