= Darling Range Hotel =

Former hotel in Bellevue, Western Australia

Coordinates: 31.8955°S 116.0323°E

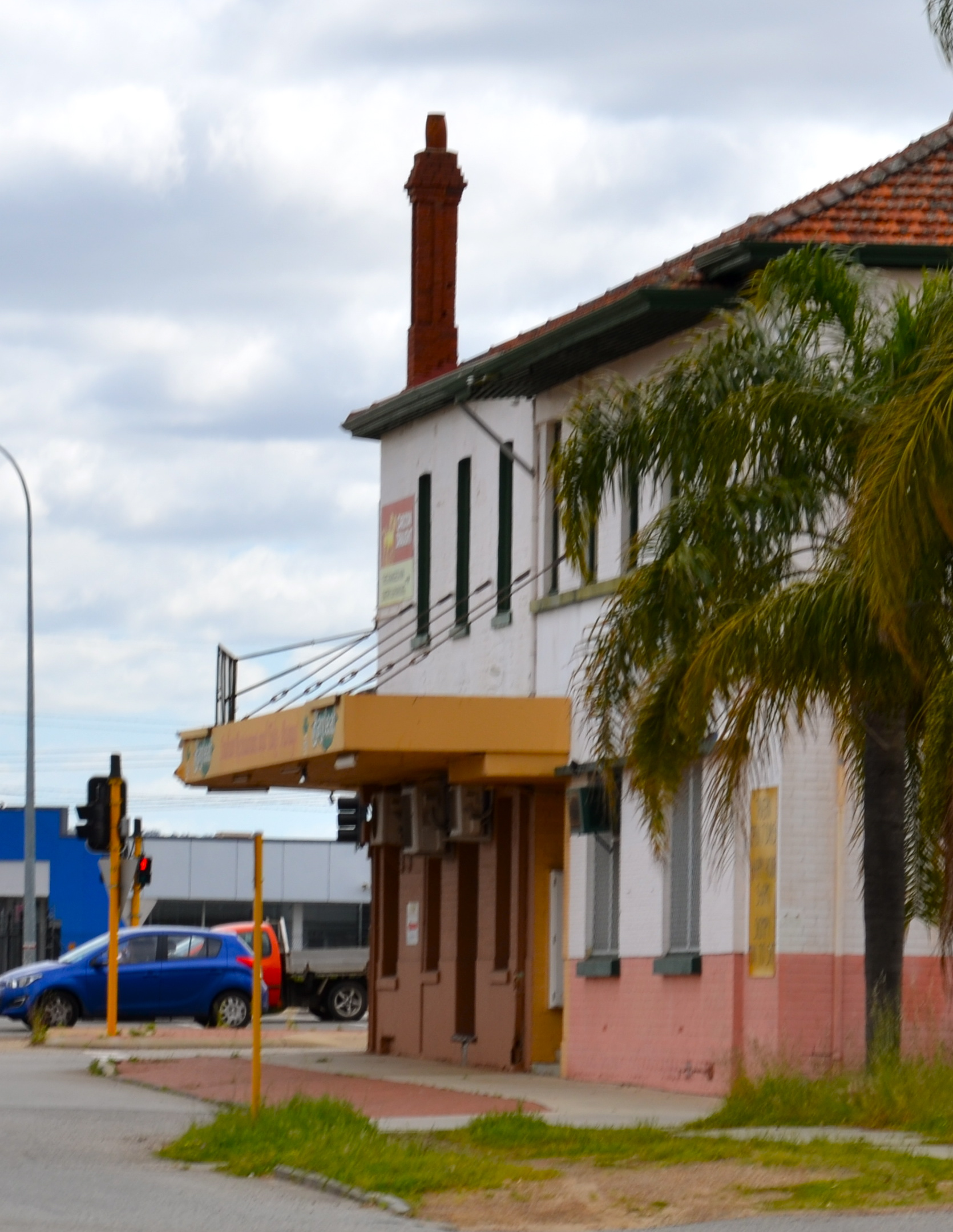
Darling Range Hotel west face, taken from the south west or Horace Street in front of the TAB

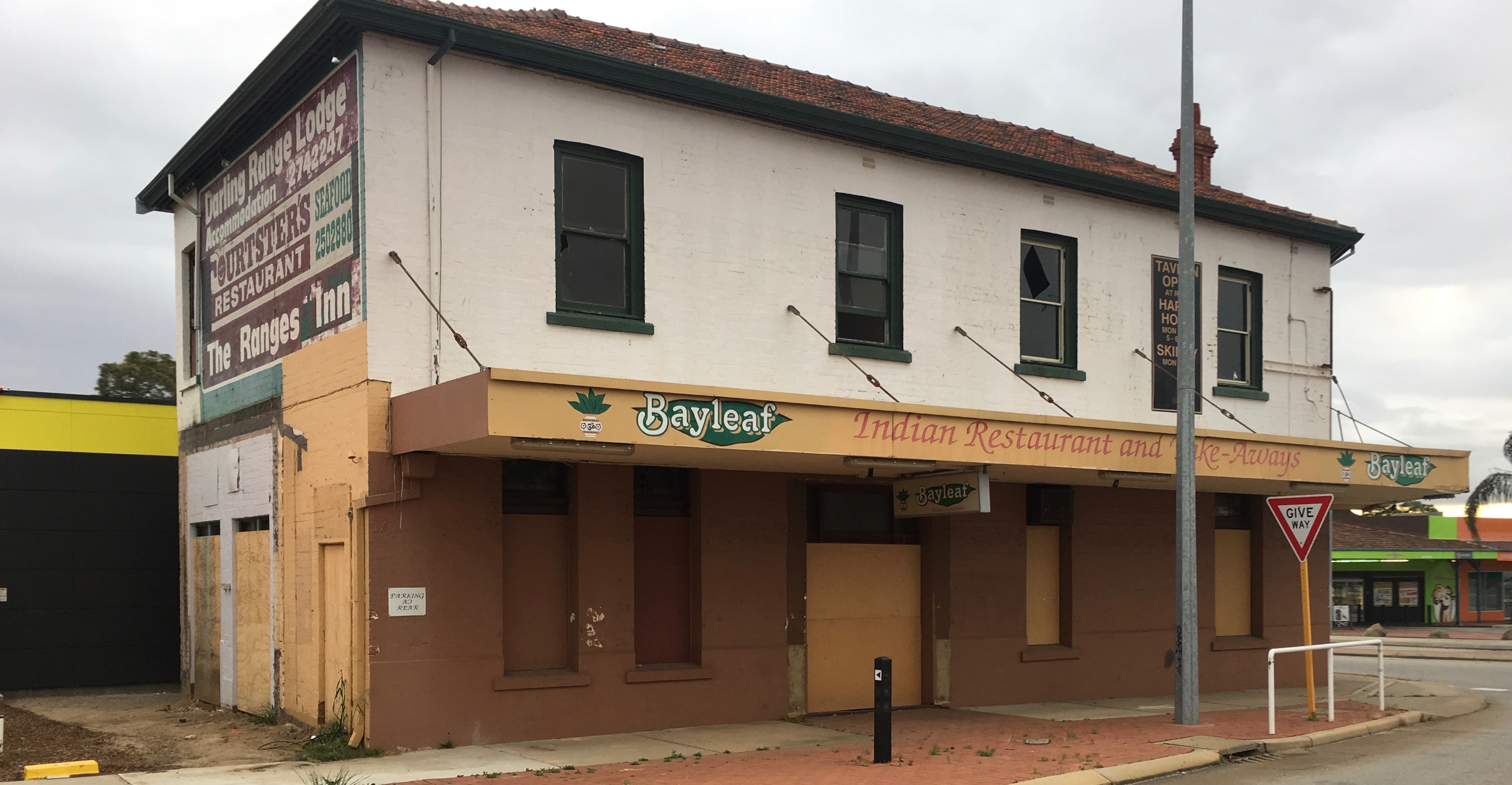
Hotel north side from Great Eastern Highway in October 2018

Darling Range Hotel was a hotel in Bellevue, Western Australia, on the end of the slope on the Great Eastern Highway at the 'bottom of' Greenmount Hill and just north of the former Bellevue railway station, and over the road from the Helena Vale Racecourse.

The locality known earlier as Helena Vale and East Midland, was near the border of the council in the hills above Greenmount Road Board – (now Shire of Mundaring), and the Midland Junction Council (now City of Swan).

In the First World War, it was the nearest hotel to the Blackboy Hill army camp

It was started as the East Midland Hotel, on the earlier name for the highway – the York Road. Despite the name the local councils called it the Bellevue Hotel.

The hotel was licensed in 1905, and its outward appearance changed over the years with change of owners and managers and circumstances.

The owners, licensees or managers to the end of the First World War included:

- 1903–1913: Thomas Wilkins
- 1914–1916: W.K. Lamzed
- 1916–1920: H. Finlayson

The longest connection on record was that of J.K. Robinson and S. Boyd 1950 -1960

It was considered an excellent location and opportunity for owners and trainers with horses at the Helena Vale Racecourse.

It was the base of a lengthy association with billiards and darts for the area.

More historic hotels in the Midland–Bellevue area have been lost due to fire, loss of licence and neglect. The Darling Range Hotel building is one of the few remaining buildings in the area with well documented connections to the troops leaving Blackboy Hill Training Camp, and leaving Helena Vale Racecourse by railway to serve in the First World War.

The building remained, with a different configuration from the First World War era, and was in potential threat of immanent demolishing to make way for a service station development, in an area that already has a significant concentration of service stations.

== Bellevue Hotel ==
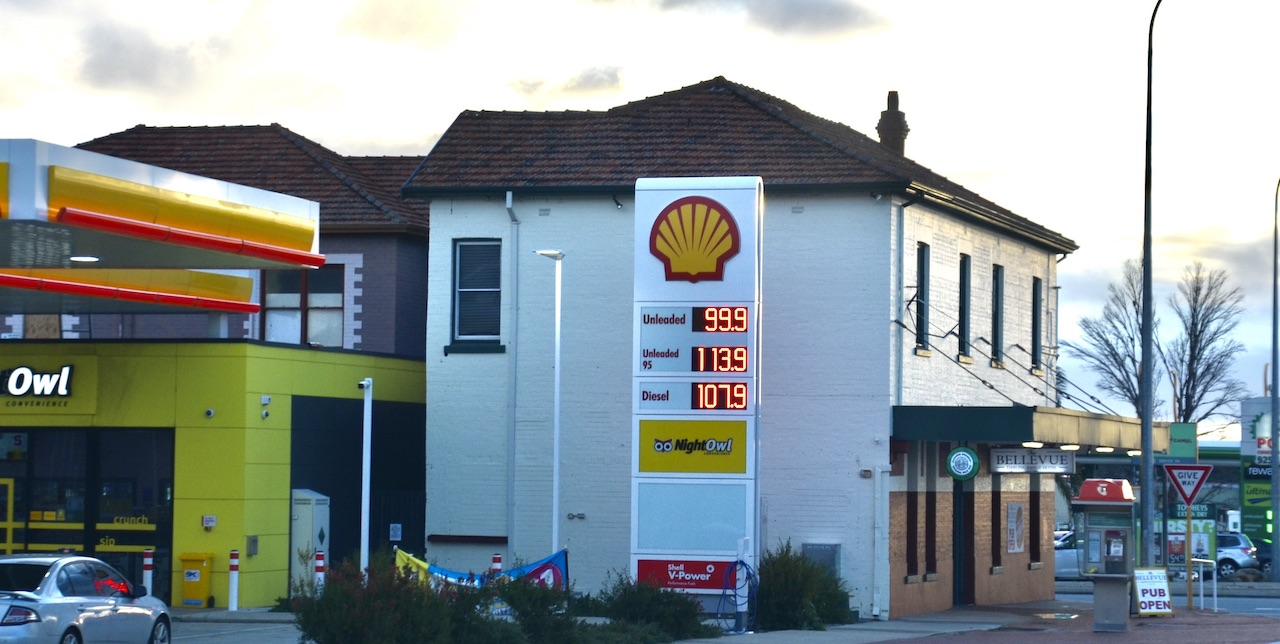
Petrol station and Hotel operational in 2020

The original hotel building was planned to be renovated in July 2018. As of 2019 the Bellevue Hotel and adjacent petrol station were operational.
