= Blackboy Hill =

Blackboy Hill may refer to:

- Blackboy Hill, Bristol, a part of Whiteladies Road, Bristol in England
- Blackboy Hill, Western Australia
