= Swan Road District =

Former local government area in Perth, Western Australia

The Swan Road District was a local government area that covered much of the Swan Valley in Western Australia. It came into existence on 24 January 1871, as a result of the Districts Road Act of 1871. It ceased to exist when it was merged with the Municipality of Guildford on 10 June 1960 to form the Swan-Guildford Road District.

When it was first established, the district's boundary extended north indefinitely. It was cut in size by the establishment of the Gingin Road District in 1893. In 1895, the Municipality of Helena Vale (later known as the Municipality of Midland Junction) was established, again reducing the size of the Swan Road District. In 1896, the Chittering Road District was established, and in 1897, the Darling Range Road District was established. In 1901, the West Guildford Road District (later known as the Bassendean Road District) was established, and finally, in 1903, the Greenmount Road District (later known as the Mundaring Road District) was established. After that, there were minor changes to the border, however they remained largely the same until its merger in 1960.

== Population ==
Historical population
Year	Pop.	±%
1911	1,829	—
1921	2,375	+29.9%
1933	3,501	+47.4%
1947	5,047	+44.2%
1954	7,366	+45.9%

== Chairmen ==
Due to incomplete records, there is not a complete list of those who have been chairman of the Swan Road Board. Among the people who have been chairman are:

- William Locke Brockman (1871–1872)
- Samuel Hamersley (1872–1873)
- Dr. Growse (1873–1875)
- Edmund Ralph Brockman (1875–1877)
- Edmund Ralph Brockman (1881–1884)
- Samuel Hamersley (1884–1885)
- Cornelius Charles Fauntleroy (1885–1886)
- Edmund Ralph Brockman (1886–1887)
- Malachi Meagher (1887–)
- Jas. Turton (1895–1896)
- W. G. Lefroy (1896–)
- Ernest William Loton (1914–1921)
