= Midland Junction (disambiguation) =

Midland Junction is a former name of Midland, Western Australia.

Midland Junction may also refer to:

- Midland Junction railway station, a former railway station in Midland, Western Australia
- Midland Junction Football Club, a defunct Australian rules football club that played in the West Australian Football League
- Town of Midland Junction, former name of the Town of Midland, a defunct municipality now part of the City of Swan
