= Helena Vale Racecourse =

Former racecourse in Midland, Western Australia

- Interactive map of Helena Vale Racecourse
- Location: Midvale, Western Australia
- Coordinates: 31°53′44″S 116°02′16″E
- Date opened: 1898
- Date closed: 1969

The Helena Vale Racecourse was a Thoroughbred horse racing track in the eastern suburb of Perth, Western Australia now known as Midvale. The course operated from the 1890s until the late 1960s.

== Early stages ==
The first meeting was held in April 1898.

The racecourse complex included stables, grandstand, mounting yard and racing track.

Patrick (Lucky) Connolly brought a controlling interest in the racecourse in the pre world war one era, and maintained an interest for over 30 years.

== First world war ==
The Helena Vale railway branch which started in the vicinity of Bellevue railway station was utilised to move troops from Blackboy Hill in the first world war.

The racecourse was across the road to the Darling Range Hotel where the proprietor in the early stage advertised the capacity to hold horses in his hotel grounds The railway branch was used to store ambulance train rolling stock in the second world war.

== Later years ==
Racing at Helena Vale stopped in 1969.

The current development over the land that was the racecourse property was being investigated in the 1970s.

The suburb of Midvale was named for its location between the racecourse and Midland. The suburb later encompassed the area formerly occupied by the racecourse.
