= Bellevue, Western Australia =

Bellevue
- Suburb
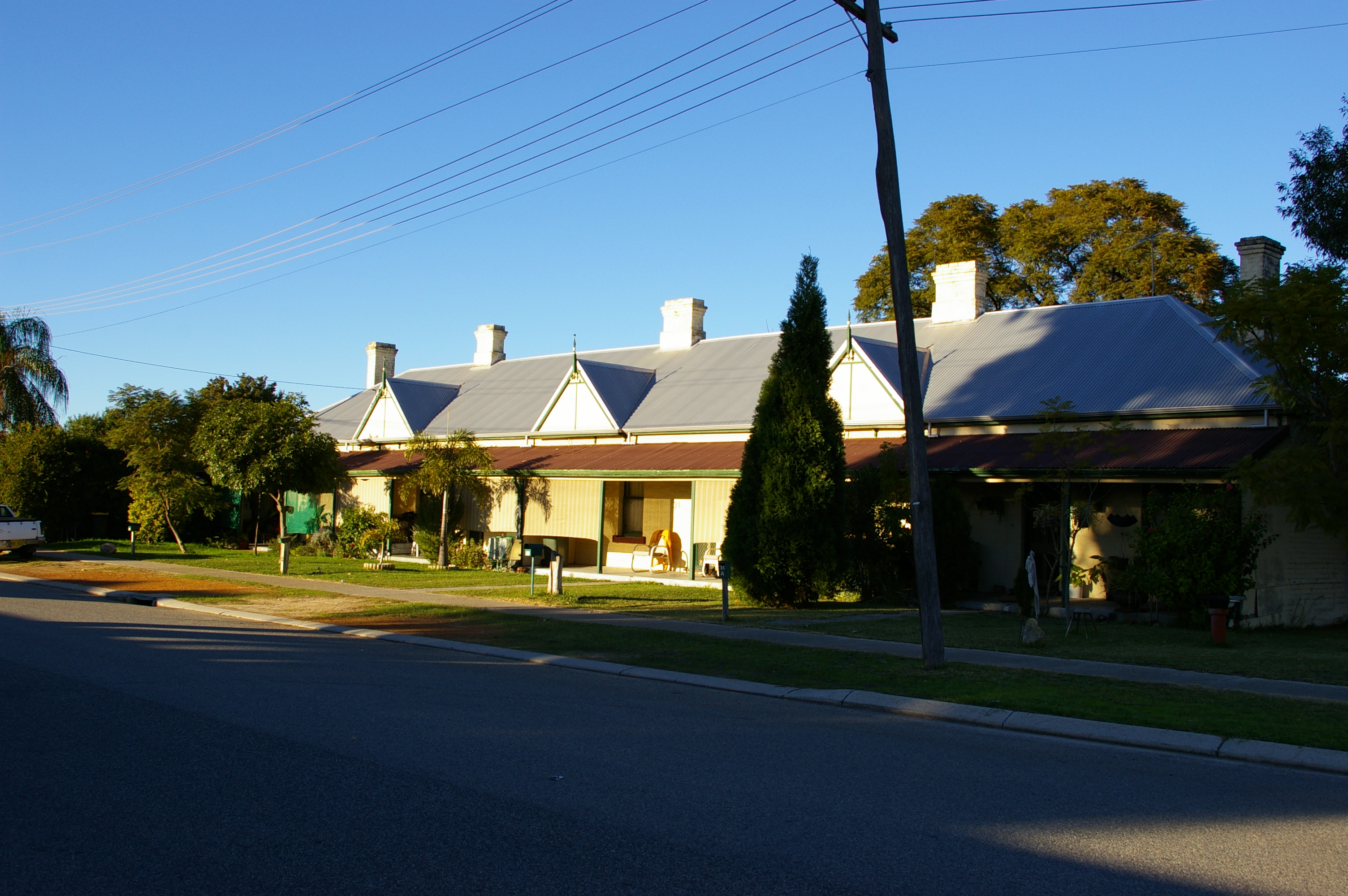
- Old housing near Military Road, Bellevue
- Interactive map of Bellevue
- Coordinates: 31.899°S 116.023°E
- Country: Australia
- State: Western Australia
- City: Perth
- LGAs: City of Swan; Shire of Mundaring
- Location: 23 km (14 mi) from Perth; 4 km (2.5 mi) from Midland
- Established: 1880s

Government
  - State electorate: Midland
  - Federal division: Hasluck, Pearce

Population
  - Total: 1,514 (SAL 2021)
- Postcode: 6056
Suburbs around Bellevue
Midland	Midvale	Swan View
Midland	Bellevue	Koongamia
Hazelmere	Helena Valley	Boya

Bellevue is an eastern suburb of Perth, Western Australia in the local government areas of the City of Swan and the Shire of Mundaring. It is at the foot of the slopes of Greenmount, a landmark on the Darling Scarp that is noted in the earliest of travel journals of the early Swan River Colony.

== Community ==
Bellevue has been bisected by the Roe Highway, railway, and substantial changes in the eastern parts of Midland. The Bellevue Primary School was closed and amalgamated with the Koongamia Primary School to form the new Clayton View Primary School slightly up the hill towards Greenmount.

It was the location of the original offices of what became the Mundaring Shire Council. It was also the location of the Catholic Church that preceded the St Anthony's church in Greenmount.

A significant point of contact in the twentieth century for the local community was the Darling Range Hotel.

== Geography ==
Bellevue is bounded by the Helena River to the south, Great Eastern Highway to the north and Military Road and Cowie Close to the west. The suburb is an even mix of residential, industrial and parkland (mainly along the Helena River).

Being at the eastern part of the Swan Coastal Plain, Bellevue is also at the foot of the Darling Scarp with Greenmount Hill as the point of access to the region to the east.

== Change ==
Bellevue has changed over the duration of its existence due to a number of factors - the extensive claypits of the early twentieth century (most having been since filled in), and the industrial locations adjacent to the railway lines.

On 15 February 2001 a large industrial fire started on 1 Bulbey Street following an explosion at a poorly maintained recycling plant handling hazardous waste with smoke and ash from the fire covering large areas of Perth. It remains the worst industrial fire in Western Australia's history, and the site remains contaminated today.

The creation of the standard gauge railway and the removal of the railway station in the mid-1960s removed it from the railway map. Construction of the Roe Highway embankment in the western part removed a section of the suburb. The Midland Military Markets were located in the west of the suburb, but were destroyed by a fire in April 2007.

== Railways ==
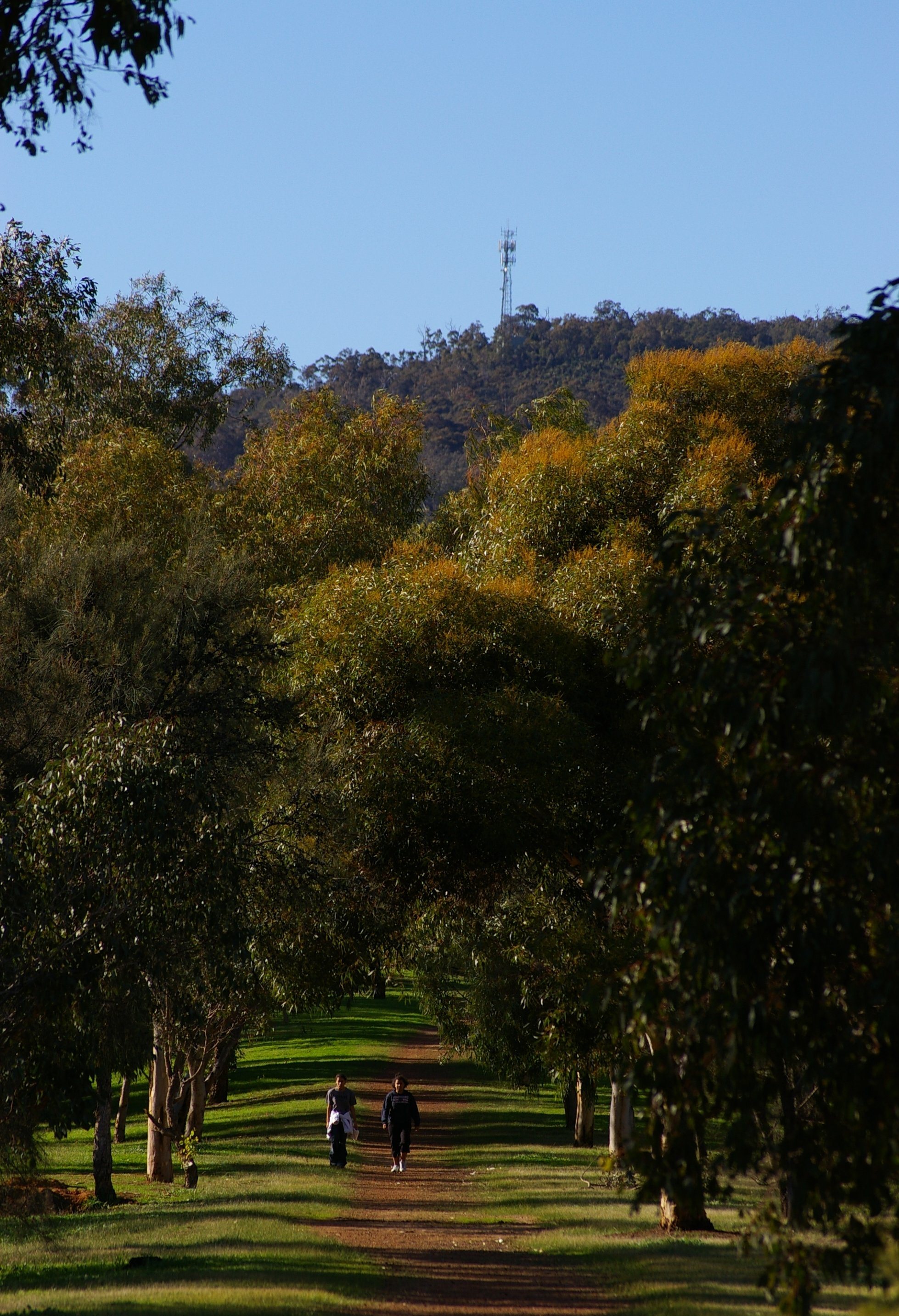
Eastern Rail reserve (first line) in Bellevue. Looking east from near the site of the Bellevue station, behind is Greenmount.

Originally known as the 24-mile (39 km) siding in 1896, it became known as Bellevue on 24 May 1897. It was the railway station at the foot of the hills through which the Eastern Railway climbed, first for the line that proceeded east to Greenmount then Boya, Darlington and on to Mundaring, then for the line through Blackboy Hill, Swan View, the Swan View Tunnel and on to Chidlow. The third and final route of the railway that goes through the Avon Valley passes over the site where the railway station was located.

During the First World War the branch line to the Helena Vale Race course was used for transporting troops between Blackboy Hill and Fremantle.

Although the old Mundaring loop was closed for passenger traffic in 1954, trains were still utilising the line to Boya, where the Mountain Quarries siding was still in use. This operation closed in 1962.

Up until the 1960s it was the terminus of the passenger services from Perth. From 1960 to 1962 a new railway station was made at Koongamia, which was half-way to the old Greenmount Railway station. The suburban service now terminates at Midland.

In 2021, a new railcar manufacturing facility was opened to locally assemble C-series trains for Metronet.

== Transport ==
=== Bus ===
- 322 Midland Station to Glen Forrest – serves Clayton Street

Bus routes serving Great Eastern Highway:

- 320 Midland Station to Mundaring
- 321 Midland Station to Glen Forrest
- 326 Midland Station to Midland Station – Circular Route
- 328 Midland Station to Chidlow

Bus routes serving Military Road:

- 277 and 278 Midland Station to High Wycombe Station
- 307 Midland Station to Kalamunda Bus Station
