= Midvale, Western Australia =

Midvale Perth, Western Australia
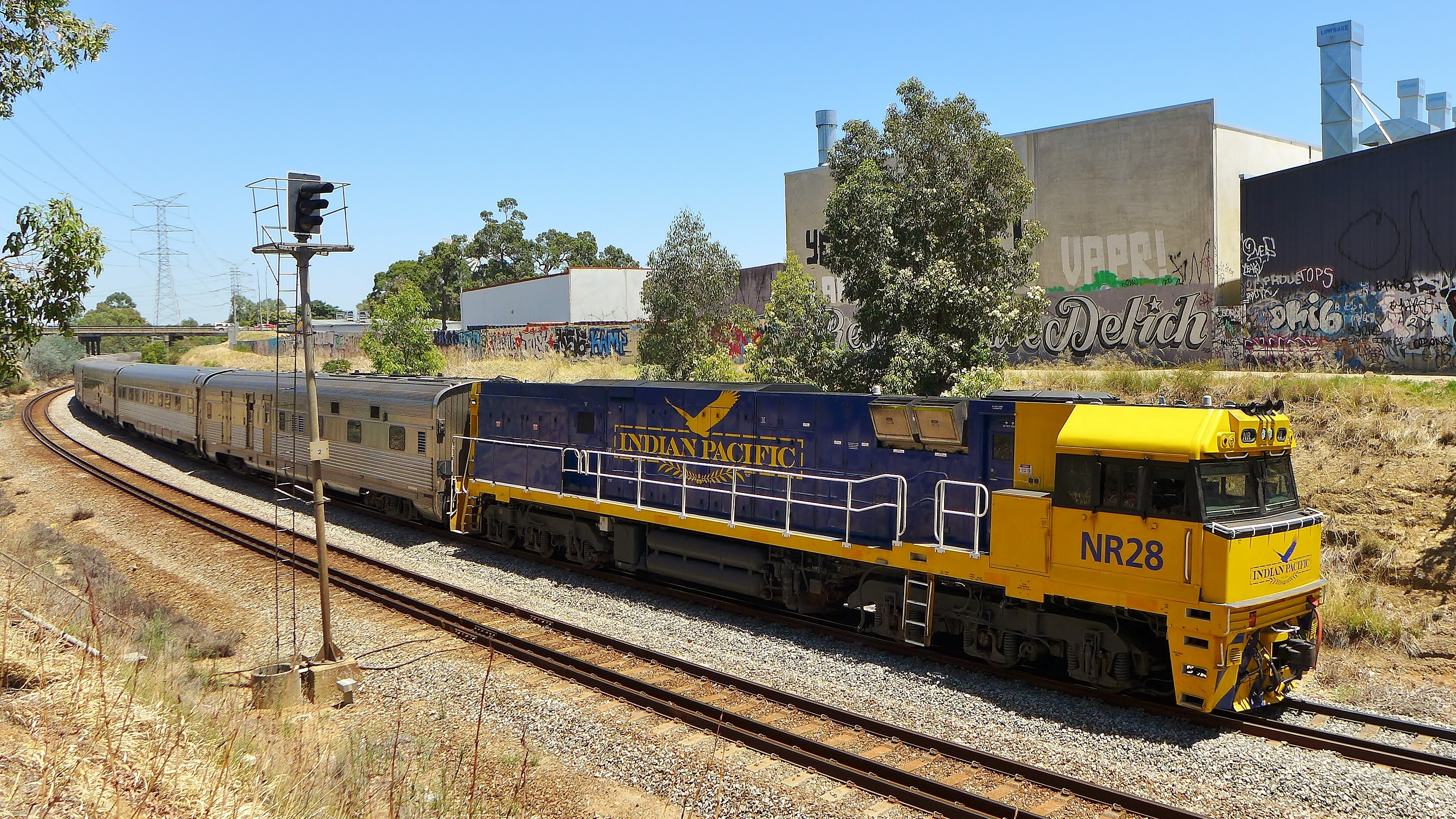
- The Indian Pacific passing along the border of Midvale
- Coordinates: 31.888°S 116.026°E
- Population: 2,283 (SAL 2021)
- Postcode(s): 6056
- LGA(s): City of Swan; Shire of Mundaring
- State electorate(s): Midland
- Federal division(s): Hasluck
Suburbs around Midvale:
Middle Swan	Middle Swan	Stratton
Midland	Midvale	Swan View
Midland	Bellevue	Greenmount

Midvale is a suburb of Perth, Western Australia, which is split between the City of Swan and the Shire of Mundaring. Its postcode is 6056.

Developed in the early 1950s, the area was named as a composite of Midland and the former Helena Vale Racecourse. The former racecourse site is now part of Midvale.

Its southern boundary is the Great Eastern Highway, and eastern the Eastern Railway.

A substantial amount of the housing in the suburb is known as State Housing; a significant amount of this housing was redeveloped by the Department of Housing under the "Eastern Horizons New Living Project".

== Transport ==
=== Bus ===
- 326 Midland Station to Midland Station – Circular Route, serves Great Eastern Highway, Victoria Parade, Hooley Road, Wellaton Street and Morrison Road

Bus routes serving Great Eastern Highway:

- 320 Midland Station to Mundaring
- 321 Midland Station to Glen Forrest
- 328 Midland Station to Chidlow

Bus routes serving Morrison Road:

- 313 Midland Station to Jane Brook
- 314 and 315 Midland Station to Midland Station – Clockwise Circular Routes
- 323 Midland Station to Swan View
- 324 and 325 Midland Station to Midland Station – Anti-Clockwise Circular Routes
- 327 Midland Station to Swan View Shopping Centre
