= Municipality of Guildford =

Former local government area in Perth, Western Australia

The Municipality of Guildford was a local government area of Western Australia. It first came into existence in 1838 as the Guildford Town Trust, before ceasing to function several years later. It was reconstituted in 1863, and became a Municipality in 21 February 1871 under the Municipal Institutions Act. It ceased to exist when it was merged with the Swan Road District on 10 June 1960 to form the Swan-Guildford Road District.

== Population ==
Historical population
Year	Pop.	±%
1911	1,669	—
1921	1,876	+12.4%
1933	2,039	+8.7%
1947	2,217	+8.7%
1954	2,134	−3.7%

== Chairmen and mayors ==
When first established, the council had a chairman. After June 1887, in celebration of the Golden Jubilee of Queen Victoria, it had a mayor. Among those who have been chairman or mayor of the Municipality of Guildford are:

- Malachi Meagher (1873–1876)
- William George Johnson (1881–1884)
- Walter Padbury (1884–1887)
- William Johnson (1888–1890)
- Frank Tratman (1890–1891)
- Thomas Jecks (1891)
- William Byers Wood (1891–1892)
- William George Johnson (1892–1893)
- Frank Henry Monger (1893–1894)
- William George Johnson (1894–1896)
- Hector Rason (1897–1898)
- William George Johnson (1907–1909)
- William Traylen (1914–1918)
- Clarence Shalders (1952–1954)
- Frank Anderson (1959–1960)
