= Shire of Swan-Guildford =

Former local government area in Perth, Western Australia

The Shire of Swan-Guildford was a local government area in Perth Western Australia.

It was established as the Swan-Guildford Road District on 10 June 1960 with the amalgamation of the Municipality of Guildford and the Swan Road District, which both dated from 1871.

It was declared a shire with effect from 23 June 1961 following the passage of the Local Government Act 1960, which reformed all remaining road districts into shires.

It ceased to exist on 20 February 1970, when it amalgamated with the Town of Midland to form the Shire of Swan.
