= Helena Vale, Western Australia =

Former municipality in Perth, Western Australia

Helena Vale was the original name for Midland Junction (now Midland) in Western Australia between 1885 and 1901. It was also the earlier name of the Midland Junction Municipality between 1895 and 1901. The name has been long associated with the area between Midland and the Darling Scarp.

== Rail branch ==
The location had a short railway siding from the Eastern Railway at Bellevue; it was opened on 1 July 1896 and closed on 13 February 1966. The siding was utilised for the transport of troops during the First World War between Blackboy Hill and Fremantle.

== Racecourse ==
Despite the name changes of the locality and municipality, the name was kept by the Helena Vale Racecourse (founded in 1896/8) until its closure in the 1970s.

The former racecourse land was converted to an industrial area – known variously as the Farrall Road industrial area or business centre – which has the Eastern Railway as its eastern boundary, Great Eastern Highway as its southern boundary and Morrison Road at its north side.

== See also ==
- Bellevue railway station, Perth
