= Bellevue railway station, Perth =

Former railway station in Perth, Western Australia

Bellevue
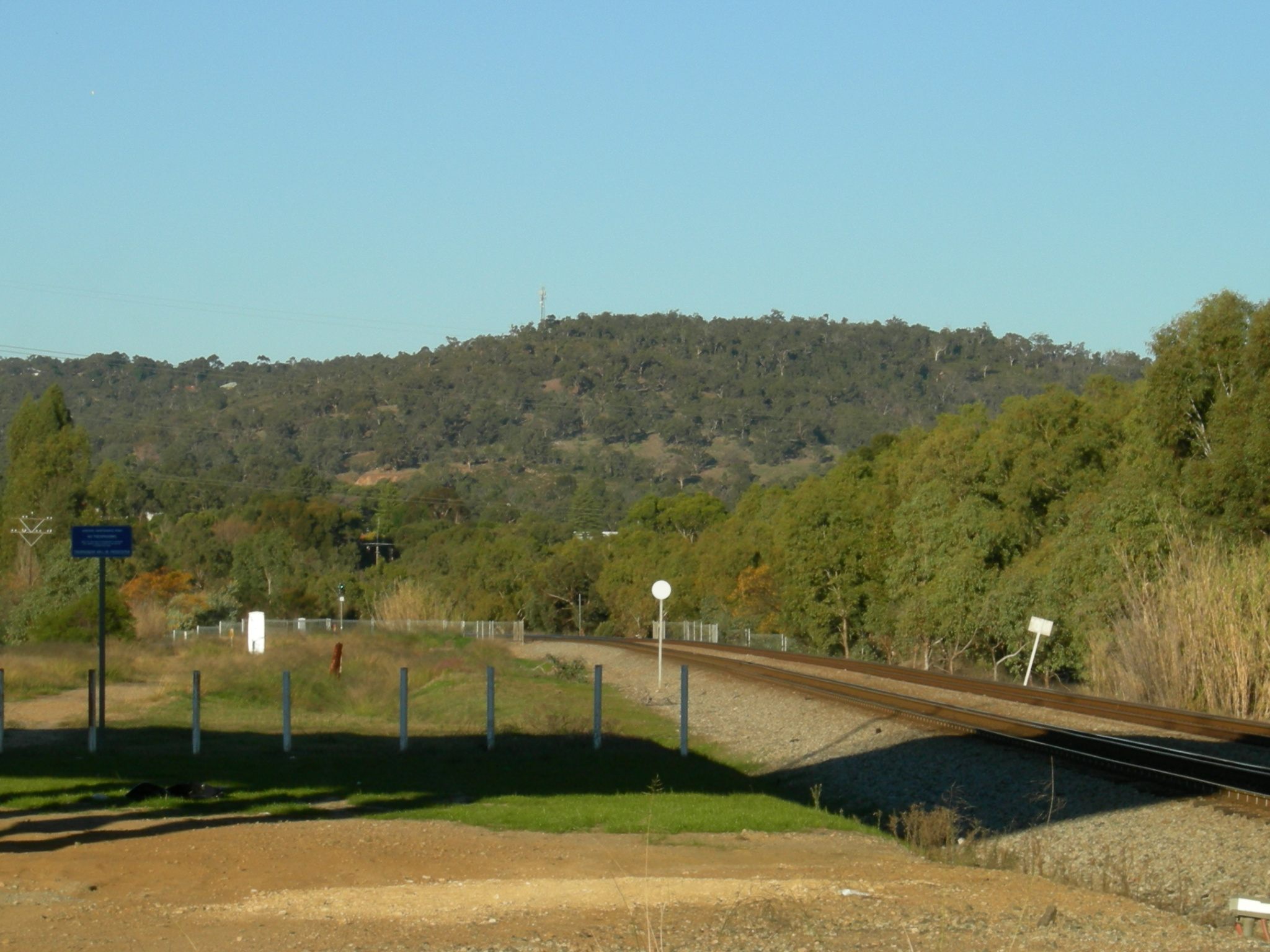
- Station site looking east

General information
- Location: Railway Parade, Bellevue
- Coordinates: 31°53′56″S 116°01′40″E
- Owner: Western Australian Government Railways
- Operator: Western Australian Government Railways
- Line: Eastern
- Distance: 18.8 kilometres from Perth
- Platforms: 2 (1 island)

Construction
- Structure type: Ground

Other information
- Status: Demolished

History
- Opened: Late 1890s
- Closed: 31 December 1965
- Former names: 24 Mile Siding
Location

Bellevue railway station (also known as Bellevue Junction) was a junction station on the Eastern Railway in the Perth suburb of Bellevue.

== History ==
On 11 March 1884, the Eastern Railway first route opened from Guildford to Chidlow via Greenmount and Sawyers Valley. Bellevue did not initially have a station. On 1 July 1896, the second route opened, deviating from the first route at Bellevue, going via Swan View and Parkerville to rejoin the original line at Mount Helena. The first route remained open.

Bellevue station was built in the late 1890s on the site of 24 Mile Siding, 2.1 kilometres east of Midland Junction with an island platform.

On 2 July 1900, a 400-metre line from Bellevue to Helena Vale Racecourse opened. This closed on 17 April 1963.

The 17 kilometre section of the first route between Mountain Quarry and Mount Helena closed on 24 January 1954, with the final 4.3 kilometre section from Mountain Quarry closed on 31 December 1965. The second route closed on 13 February 1966 to be replaced by the standard gauge third route.

Bellevue was for considerable periods of its history the terminus of metropolitan passenger services from Perth. Exceptions after the closing of the Mundaring branch railway in 1954, were when the Koongamia station construction saw re-use of the defunct Mundaring Branch Railway between 1960 and 1962. It was also served by long-distance trains to Chidlow and Northam.

Operations in the vicinity of the western part of the Bellevue railway station were considered to be part of the Midland Junction marshalling area in later years of operation. Services to Bellevue station were withdrawn on 31 December 1965 and the station closed.

== Proposed new station ==
As part of the Metronet project, it is proposed to extend Transperth's Midland line services to Bellevue which will require a new station to be built.
