= Town of Midland =

Former local government area in Western Australia

Coordinates: 31°53′42″S 115°59′35″E

- Local government area
- Country: Australia
- State: Western Australia
- Region: Eastern Perth
- Established: 1895
- Council seat: Midland

Area
  - Total: 6.5 km^{2} (2.5 sq mi)

Population
  - Total: 9,335 (1966 census)
  - Density: 1,436/km^{2} (3,720/sq mi)

The Town of Midland was a local government area in the eastern suburbs of Perth, Western Australia, centred on the suburb of Midland.

== History ==
It was established as the Municipality of Helena Vale on 18 December 1895, when it was proclaimed as the local government authority for the rapidly growing town of Helena Vale. The name "Helena Vale" was chosen because of its closeness to the Helena River.

The first meeting of the newly elected Municipality of Helena Vale was held at the goods shed of the Midland Railway Company on 18 December 1895. Edwin Halpin was sworn in as the first mayor, along with councillors Alfred Eggleston, Thomas Norman, William Smiley, Alexander Watt, Francis Honey and William Brown.

On 12 April 1901, it was renamed the Municipality of Midland Junction after the Midland Junction railway station that had opened in 1894. On 1 July 1961, it was restyled the Town of Midland following the enactment of the Local Government Act 1960.

On 1 April 1970, the Council was forced by the State Government to merge with the Shire of Swan-Guildford to form a new council that would operate effectively and economically for the area, the Shire (later City) of Swan. It is now a major suburb within the City of Swan.

== Population ==
Year	Population
1903	2,208
1911	3,484
1921	4,937
1933	5,408
1947	6,182
1954	8,496
1961	9,256
1966	9,335

== Mayors ==
Mayor	Term
Edwin James Halpin	1895–1898
William Gerald Lefroy	1899–1900
Alexander Ernest Watt	1901–1902
Dr William Elgee	1902–1903
Ferdinand Charles Farrall	1903–1905
William Robert Crosbie	1905–1906
Percival Ford Robinson	1906–1911
George Hiscox	1911–1914
Archibald Jamieson	1914–1915
Peter Sampson	1915–1916
George Hiscox	1916–1923
Benjamin Davies	1923–1924
William Robert Crosbie	1924–1929
Joseph James Poynton	1929–1933
Arthur William Brown	1933–1933
Francis William Tuohy	1933–1939
George Alexander Kennedy	1939–1940
Albert Weston Pauly	1940–1946
Francis William Tuohy	1946–1947
James Howard Cole	1947–1955
Walter Samuel Doney	1955–1962
William Patrick Calnon	1962–1970

== See also ==
- Midland Railway Workshops
