= Blackboy Hill, Western Australia =

War memorial in Perth, Western Australia

Blackboy Hill Commemorative Site
- Blackboy Hill
- Australia
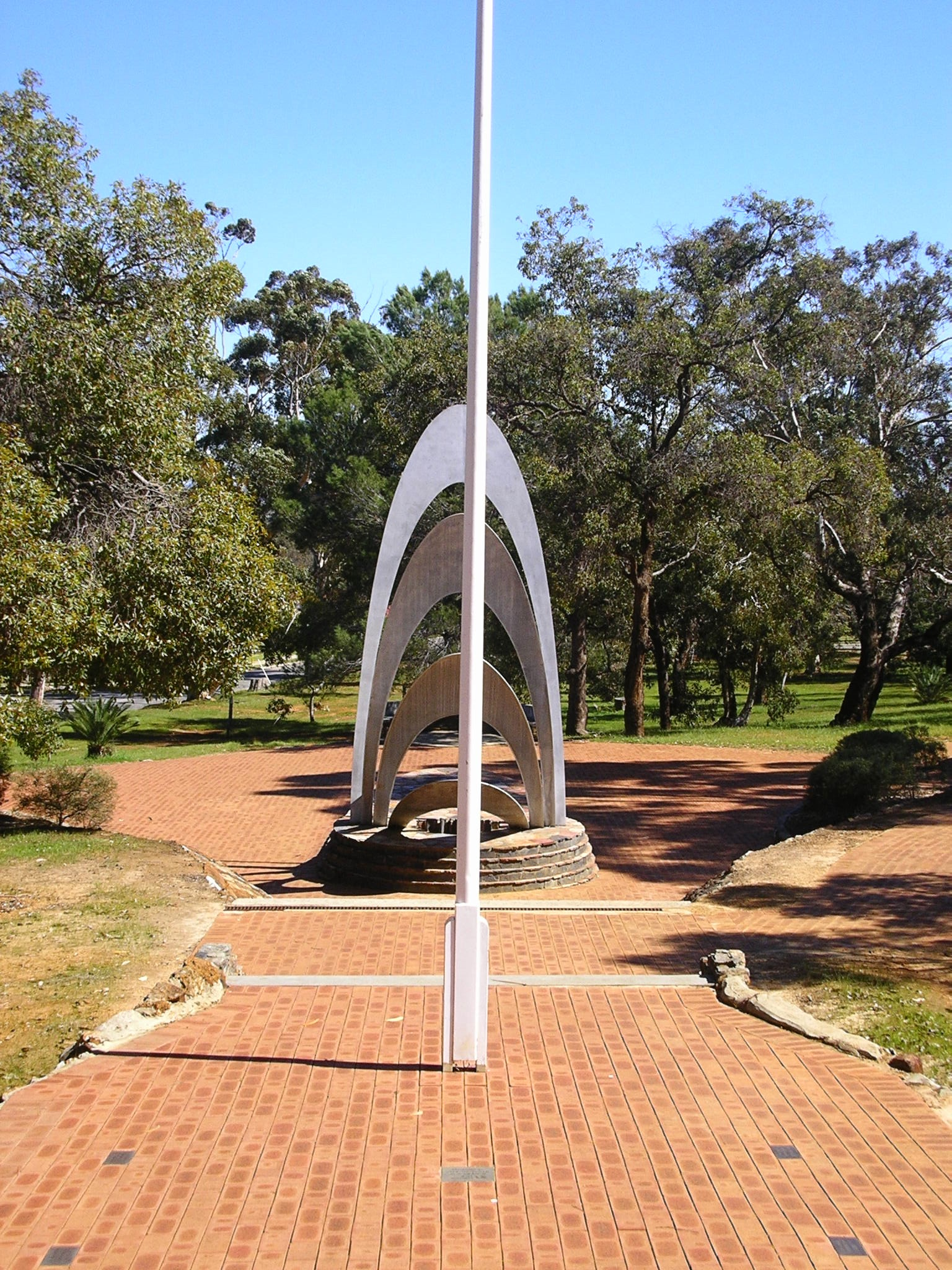
- Memorial and flagpole aligned to setting sun on Anzac Day
- For Australian Imperial Force
- Location: 31°53′49″S 116°02′44″E; Greenmount, Western Australia

Western Australia Heritage Register
- Designated: 31 March 2006
- Reference no.: 4479

Blackboy Hill was named after the Australian native plant Xanthorrhoea preissii, (Note: Xanthorrhoea preissii, colloquially called grasstrees, also used to be called blackboys. However, this term is now recognised as inappropriate.) which dominated the site that is now absorbed into Greenmount, Western Australia.

Originally a military camp, the facilities and adjacent structures were on the hill that is now used by St Anthony's Primary School and Church, and Greenmount Primary School. The remaining land (which has been left as a memorial to the troops who used the training camp) is known on official documents and maps as the Blackboy Hill Commemorative Site, but local signage tends to refer to the location simply as Blackboy Hill.

== First World War ==
During the troop build up for the First World War, the site was a military training camp used to house large numbers of Australian Imperial Force (AIF) troops before they left for the various battlefront locations in Europe and the Middle East. Facilities were moved from other parts of the metropolitan area to improve facilities which were quite basic.

Troops were transported to the adjacent Helena Vale Railway station and marched across to the camp, so as to not interfere with the working of the Eastern Railway.

Blackboy Hill Post Office opened on 29 August 1914 and closed on 30 November 1918, defining the period of occupation of the site. An office of the same name was opened from 1929 until 1932, when it was renamed Greenmount Hill.

Around April 1919, following the end of hostilities, the Imperial forces camp was turned over to the Health department to act as a fever hospital, treating Spanish flu.

In the 1930s unemployed relief workers utilised the camp area.

During the Second World War, the site was also used extensively by the 2nd AIF and other Australian military forces.

== Railway station ==
Blackboy Hill was a named railway stopping place between Bellevue and Swan View between the 1940s and 1960s, it was not related to the training camp or first world war troop movements.

== Publication ==
The Camp Chronicle: the soldiers paper was a locally produced newsletter recording details of life in the camp before disembarkation for overseas service.

== Commemorative Site ==
The commemorative site is a small 0.5-hectare (1.2-acre) site on the southern edge of the former camp site, adjacent to Innamincka Road, Greenmount Hill. It is bounded by a 1.5-hectare (3.7-acre) public park to separate it from the adjacent schools and residential area.

In recent times, the main annual event at this site are the Anzac Day commemorations, which centre on a memorial named after the location. The Anzac memorial is on a segment of ground that is between the two primary schools. It is maintained by the Mundaring Council, and has a committee that oversees management of the site. The sunset service and the dawn service – as well as an all-night vigil – are maintained by the Bilgoman District of the Scout Association of Western Australia and the Returned and Services League of Australia.

Most of the original larger site is now covered by housing development, but up until this began in the early 1990s, remnants of the army camp and many associated rubbish pits were visible.

== Centenary revived interest ==
At the approach of the centenary of the usage of the site (2014–2015), renewed interest in the site and its functions emerged in Western Australian media.

There had been accounts much earlier that give understanding of the importance of the site – such as in 1937 in the Western Mail, with the story preceded by verse about Battalion Eleven which had formed at Blackboy:

They were the boys from the Western State,
Brave Battalion Eleven;
They did not tarry, they did not wait,
When the call was given.
First to respond to their country's need
Nothing they feared, nor death did they heed.
Brave Battalion Eleven!

— S.M. Harris

Having been written in a time when returned troops would have been still alive to share stories and anecdotes about the camp, the 1937 era reminiscences had material which are not so easy to find in the 2013/2014 reporting of the site.

=== Book ===
The 2013/2014 Lotterywest funded project to produce a book was being conducted by Valerie Elliott and Shannon Coyle from the Katharine Susannah Prichard Writers Centre

A considerable number of people contributed to the volume, including local military historian Paul Bridges, then of the Guildford Historical society, formerly of the Mundaring and Hills Historical Society. who wrote the introductory chapter Overview: BlackBoy Hill Training Camp.

The contents include chapters by a range of over ten authors, including research done by pupils of the adjacent Greenmount Primary School.

=== Commemorations and events ===
In August September October 2014, numbers of events were planned for the centenary.

=== Centenary train ===
In October 2014, a centenary train, travelled from Midland to Fremantle, commemorating the travel to departing ships of the troops who had trained at Blackboy Hill and went off to fight in the war.

== Archaeology ==
Shane Burke of Notre Dame University in Fremantle has overseen archaeological work in the 2000s on the area and has worked with students to ascertain what can be discovered, despite considerable urban development and changes in the area.

== Gallery ==
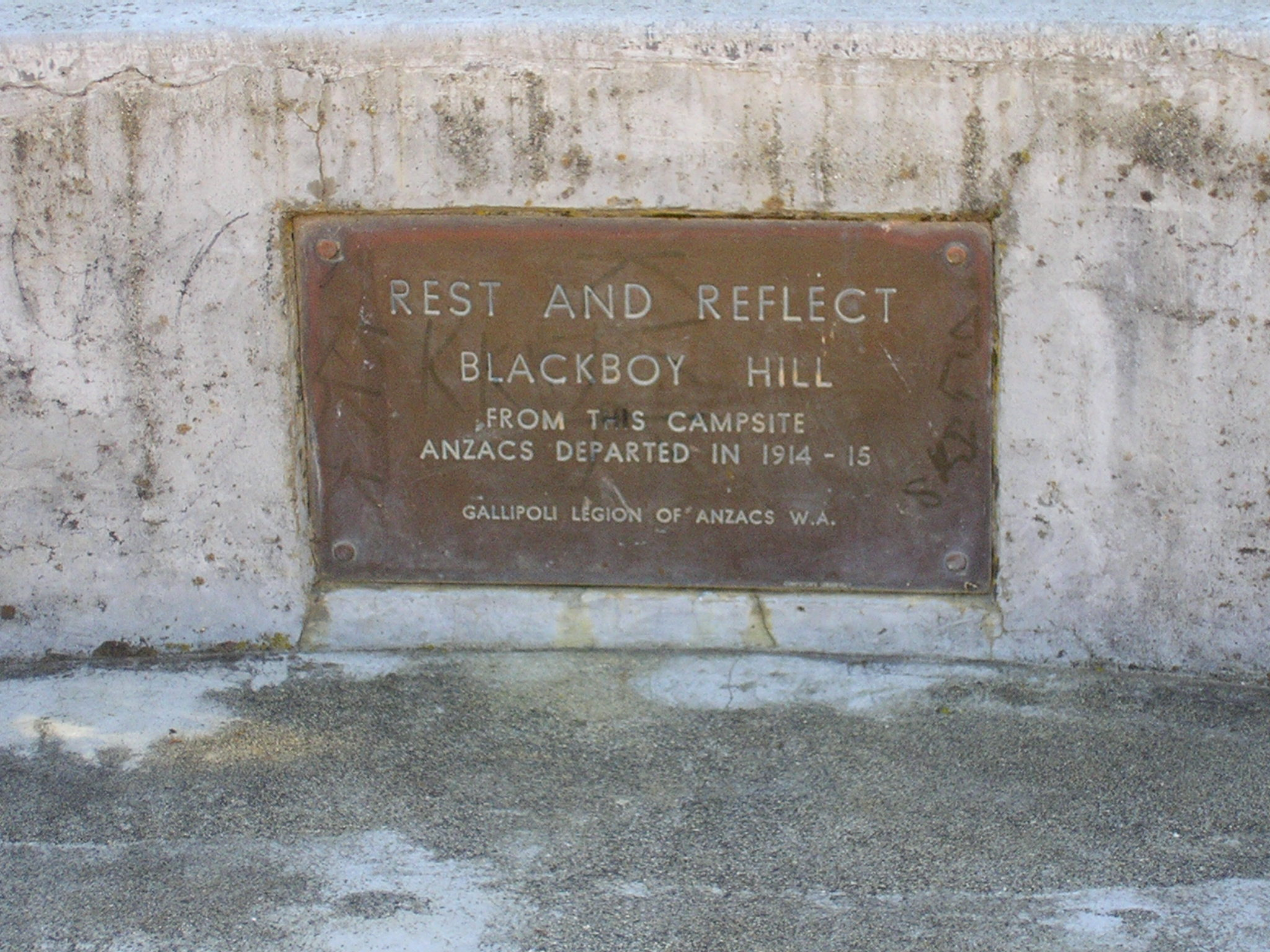

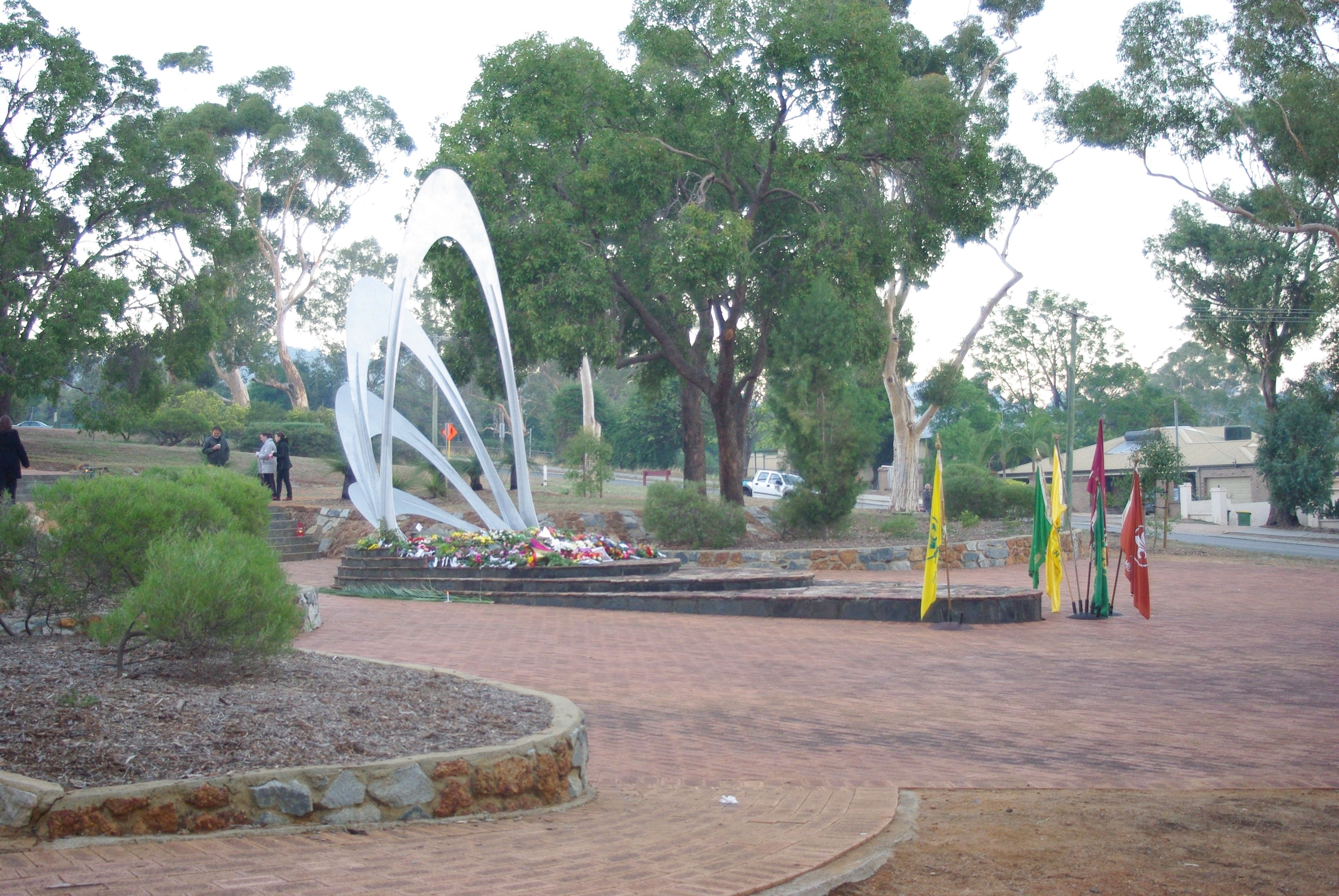

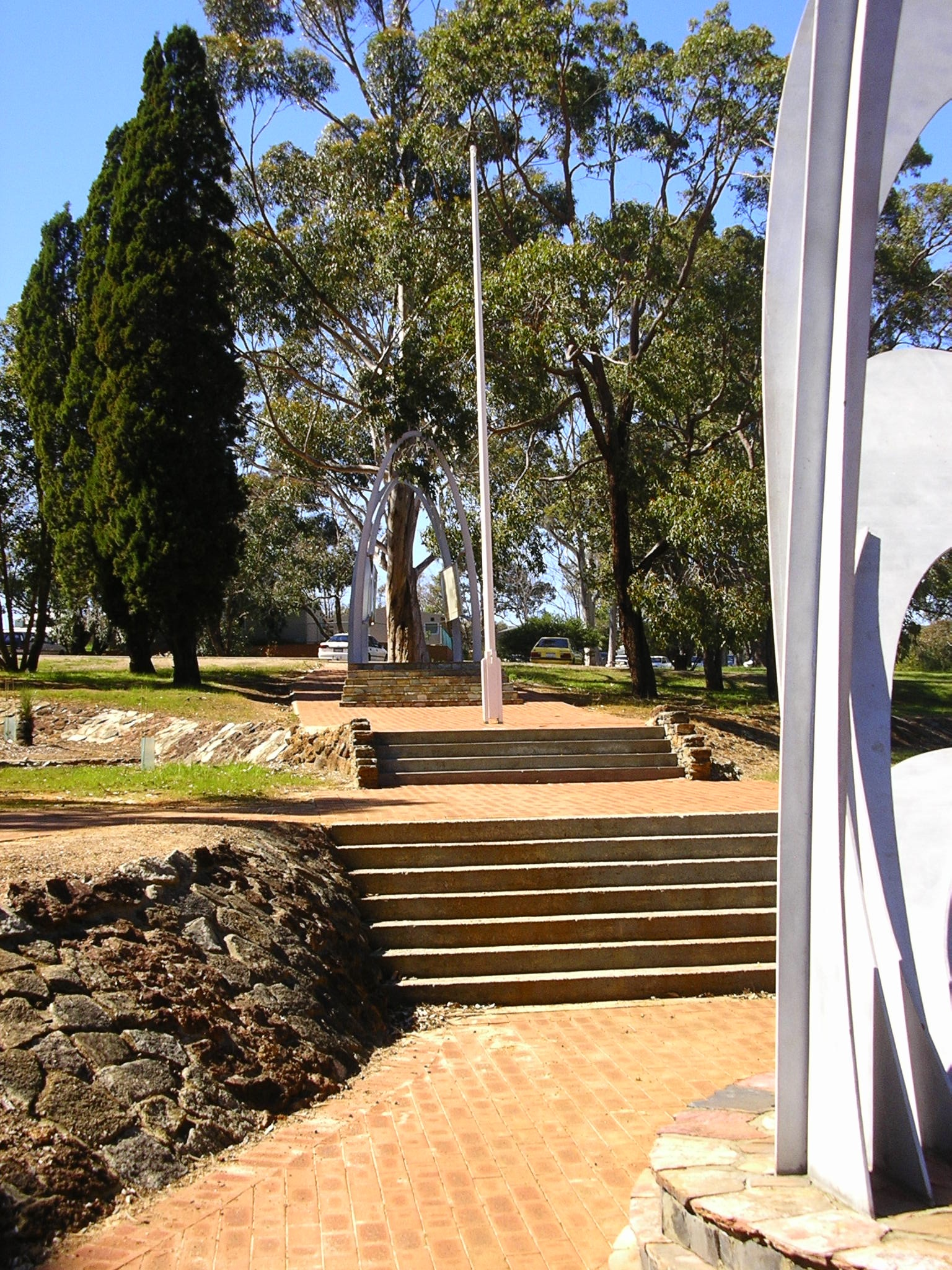

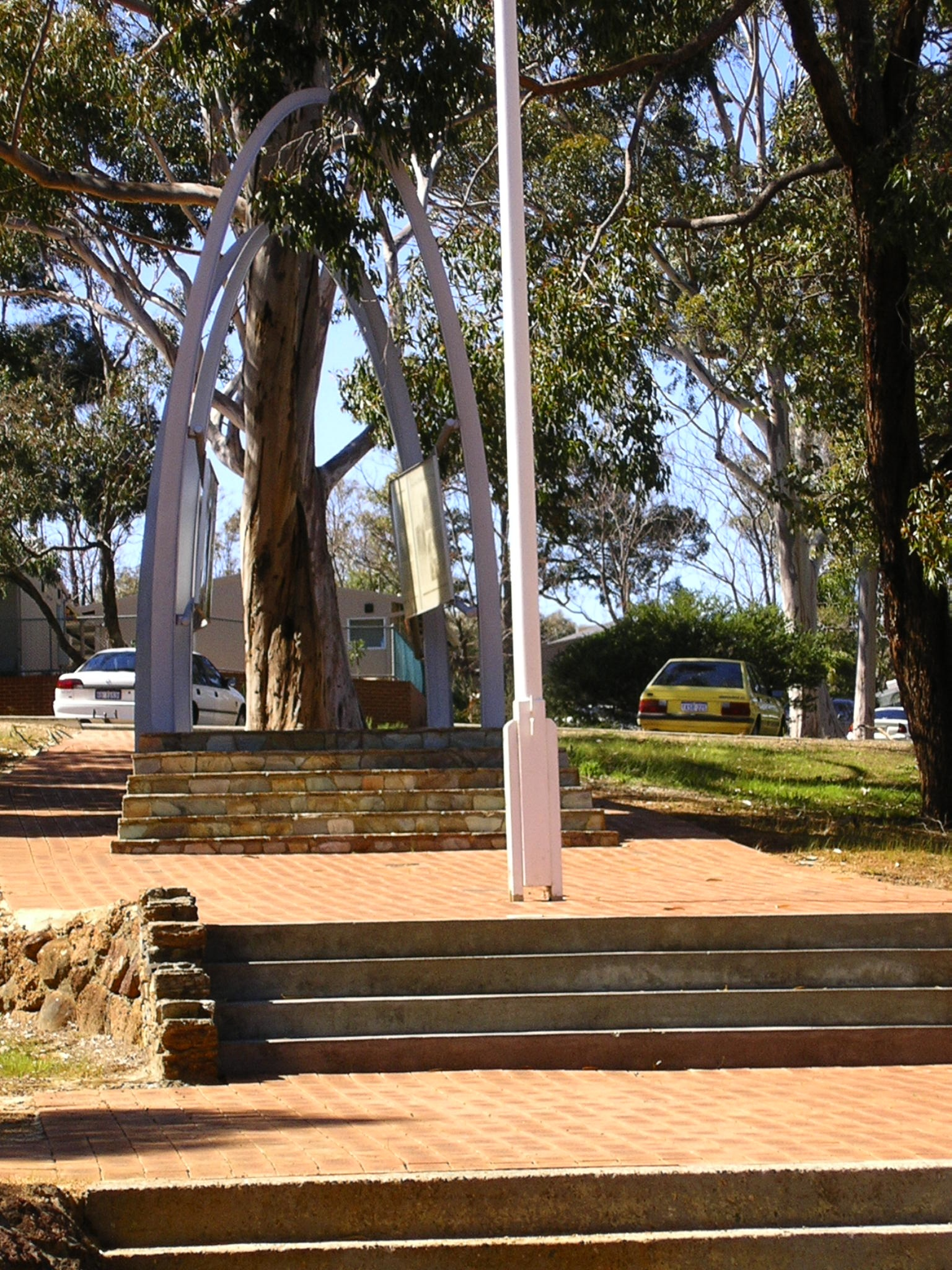

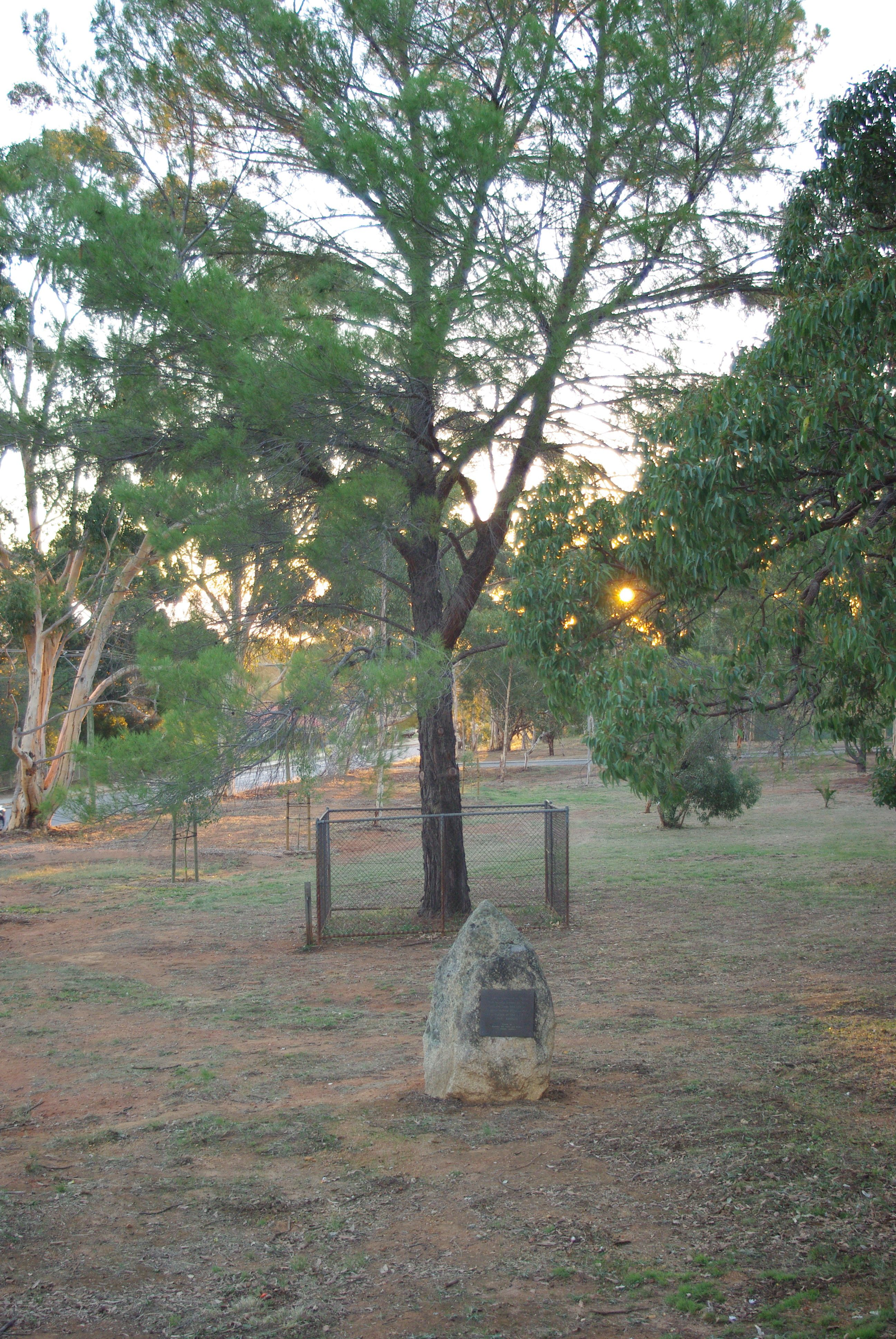
