= Upper Swan, Western Australia =

Upper Swan
- Suburb
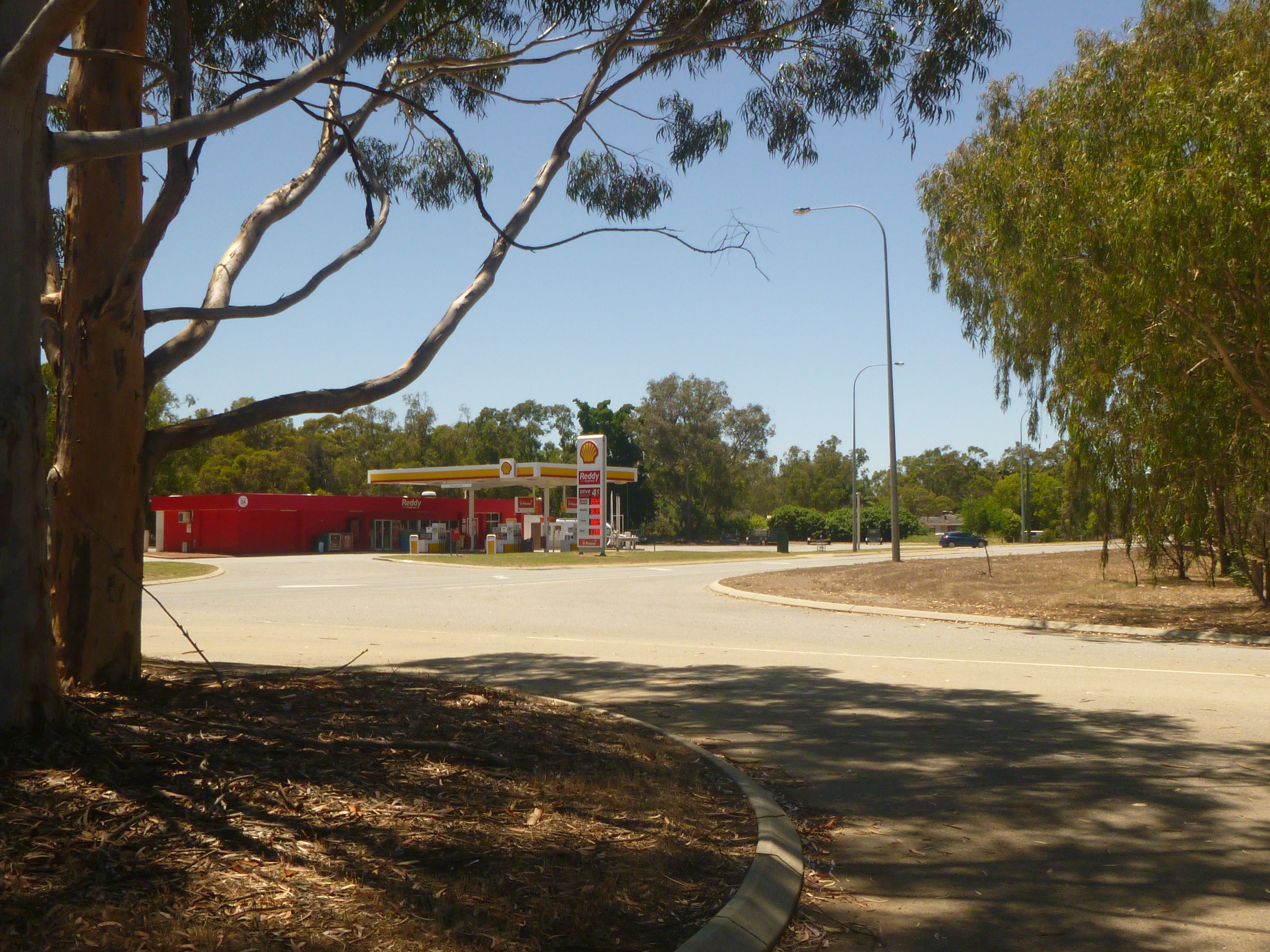
- Shell service station on Great Northern Highway
- Interactive map of Upper Swan
- Coordinates: 31.773°S 116.025°E
- Country: Australia
- State: Western Australia
- City: Perth
- LGA: City of Swan

Government
  - State electorate: Swan Hills
  - Federal division: Hasluck

Area
  - Total: 19.8 km^{2} (7.6 sq mi)

Population
  - Total: 549 (SAL 2021)
- Postcode: 6069
Suburbs around Upper Swan
Bullsbrook	Bullsbrook	Gidgegannup
The Vines	Upper Swan	Brigadoon
Belhus	Baskerville	Brigadoon

Upper Swan is an outer suburb of Perth, Western Australia, located 33 kilometres (21 mi) north-east of Perth's central business district in the City of Swan. The locality sits at the confluence of the Swan River, the Millendon Junction to Narngulu railway line and Great Northern Highway, which is where the main suburban townsite is located. The rest of the locality is characterised by rural and industrial land uses such as vineyards, equestrian estates and quarries.

== History ==
=== Name ===
Prior to the introduction of localities and suburbs, the descriptive name "Upper Swan" was used generally for the whole area at the head of the Swan River, including localities such as Belhus, Henley Brook, Brigadoon and Millendon. Examples of this usage include the Upper Swan Memorial Hall in Baskerville and the All Saints Church in Henley Brook, which was previously known as the Upper Swan Church.

The name became specific to the modern-day bounded area of Upper Swan in 1972, when the postal locality was gazetted.

=== Prehistory ===
The Swan River was traditionally used by the Noongar people as a thoroughfare to the coastal plains. During a clay extraction operation in Upper Swan in the 1980s, a 40,000 year old artefact scatter was identified on the north bank of the river by researchers Pearce and Barbetti. It is considered to be one of the most ancient Aboriginal discoveries in Australia.

=== Colonial era ===
The 1829 establishment of the Swan River Colony brought a system of land grants for settlers to take up and farm. The modern suburb of Upper Swan was contained mostly within Swan Location 1, along with small parts of Locations 3 and 4. Location 1, "Ellen's Brook" was granted to George Leake and Location 3 was granted to Peter Broun who named it "Coulston". William Shaw took up Location 4, naming it "Belvoir" after Belvoir Castle in Shaw's native Leicestershire.

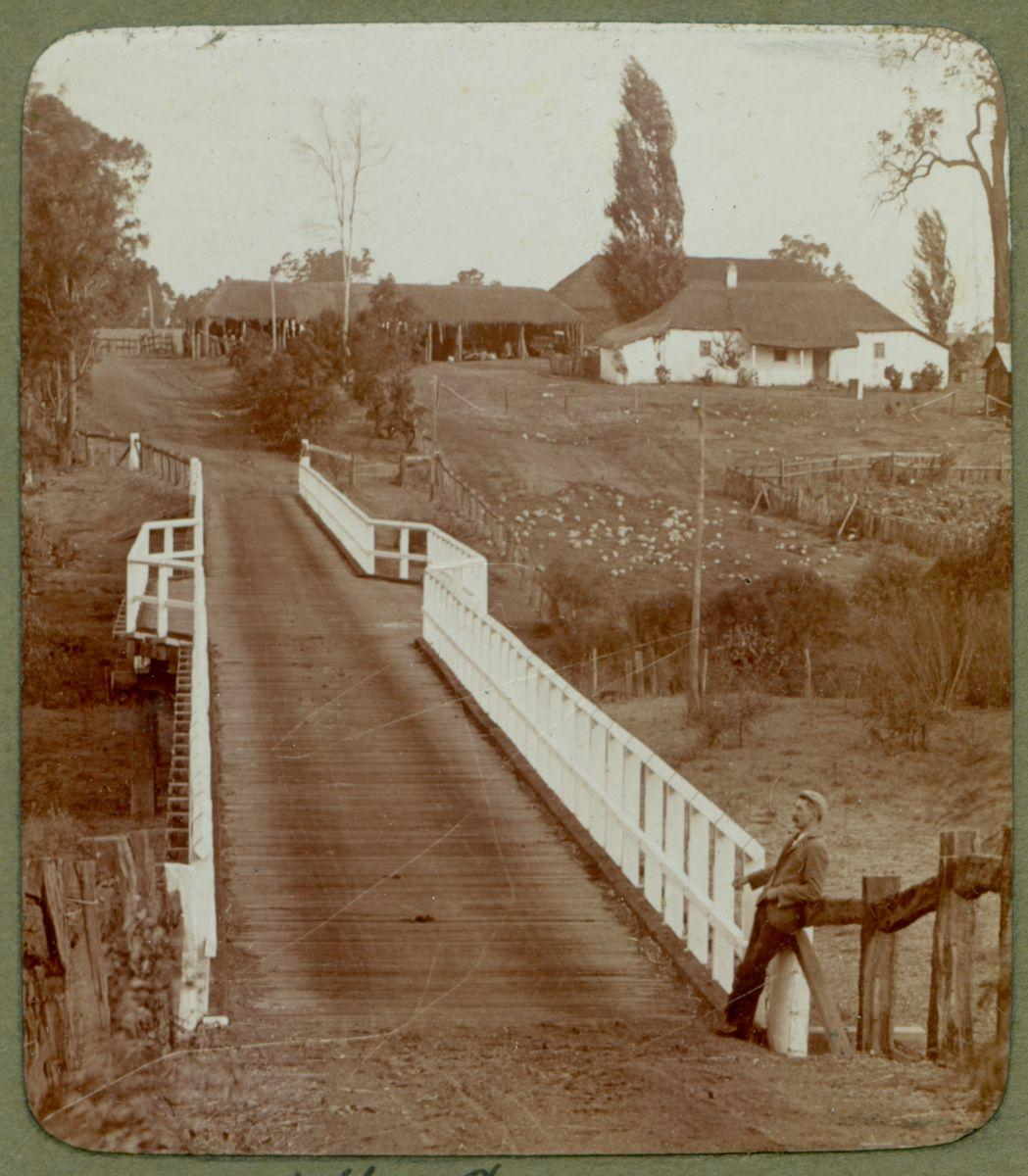
The original Upper Swan Bridge circa 1901, facing south

The first townsite activity established in the area was a remote military barracks on the Coulston estate in 1832, to police local land grants against theft of stock from native Whadjuk Noongar people. Shaw established the area's first vineyard at Belvoir using South African grapes, while Ellen's Brook became a successful pastoral farm under the management of Henry Bull. After 1838, Leake gifted the northern Upper Swan half of Ellen's Brook to Bull, who named the new estate "Woburn Park". The southern part of Location 1 became Belhus. Bull ultimately left Western Australia in 1848, leaving Woburn Park to be managed by agents, while Belvoir passed into the ownership of the Loton family.

Indentured labour consisting of Aboriginal prisoners and British convicts were brought in by the government to build the Upper Swan Bridge over the Swan River, forming the beginning of the Gingin Road. Further developments came with the Swan Road District establishing local government in 1871, followed by the construction of the Midland railway line over a new bridge and through Upper Swan in 1891. The railway was complemented with a new rail siding in Upper Swan in 1894. Finally, Upper Swan Primary School was established in 1905 to serve children of the local area.

=== Modern era ===
The area around the Upper Swan Siding was subdivided into one-acre and half-acre lots as the 'Upper Swan Estate' in 1910. However, the area remained rural and did not see any substantial residential development or take-up until the 1970s. The access roads in the neighbourhood were gazetted in 1923.

As the rural land holdings became subdivided from their original colonial grants, new hobby farmers, horticulturalists and viticulturalists began to move into the area to establish orchards and wineries, following the gold rush population boom. This followed a similar trend in other areas of the fertile river plains such as Henley Brook and Belhus, establishing the modern character of the Swan Valley region. Well-known large-scale vineyards in Upper Swan included S. W. Copley's St. Alban estate and the Noack family's Swanville estate, while prominent families with agricultural smallholdings included the Kendalls, the Hallatts, the Nolans and the Glavotas. Notably, the Loton family's Belvoir vineyard and estate avoided subdivision altogether, which in recent years is known as Belvoir Amphitheatre

The original convict-built Upper Swan Bridge was destroyed in a flash flood in the winter of 1926, causing widespread disruption for residents and businesses in the area. It was rebuilt later that same year, before being rebuilt again in 1955.

The area saw further facility developments towards the mid-century. The Bureau of Meteorology established the Upper Swan Research Station in 1951 for climate tracking, which was operated continuously for over 40 years until its closure in 1998. The area's first service station, Ginger's Roadhouse, was also founded on Great Northern Highway at this time by the Squires family. A syndicate of mining companies also proposed to develop an aluminium refinery and residual disposal site in Upper Swan, on what is now The Vines. Despite being assented to in 1971 by an Act of Parliament, it failed to proceed after the Environmental Protection Authority refused approval.

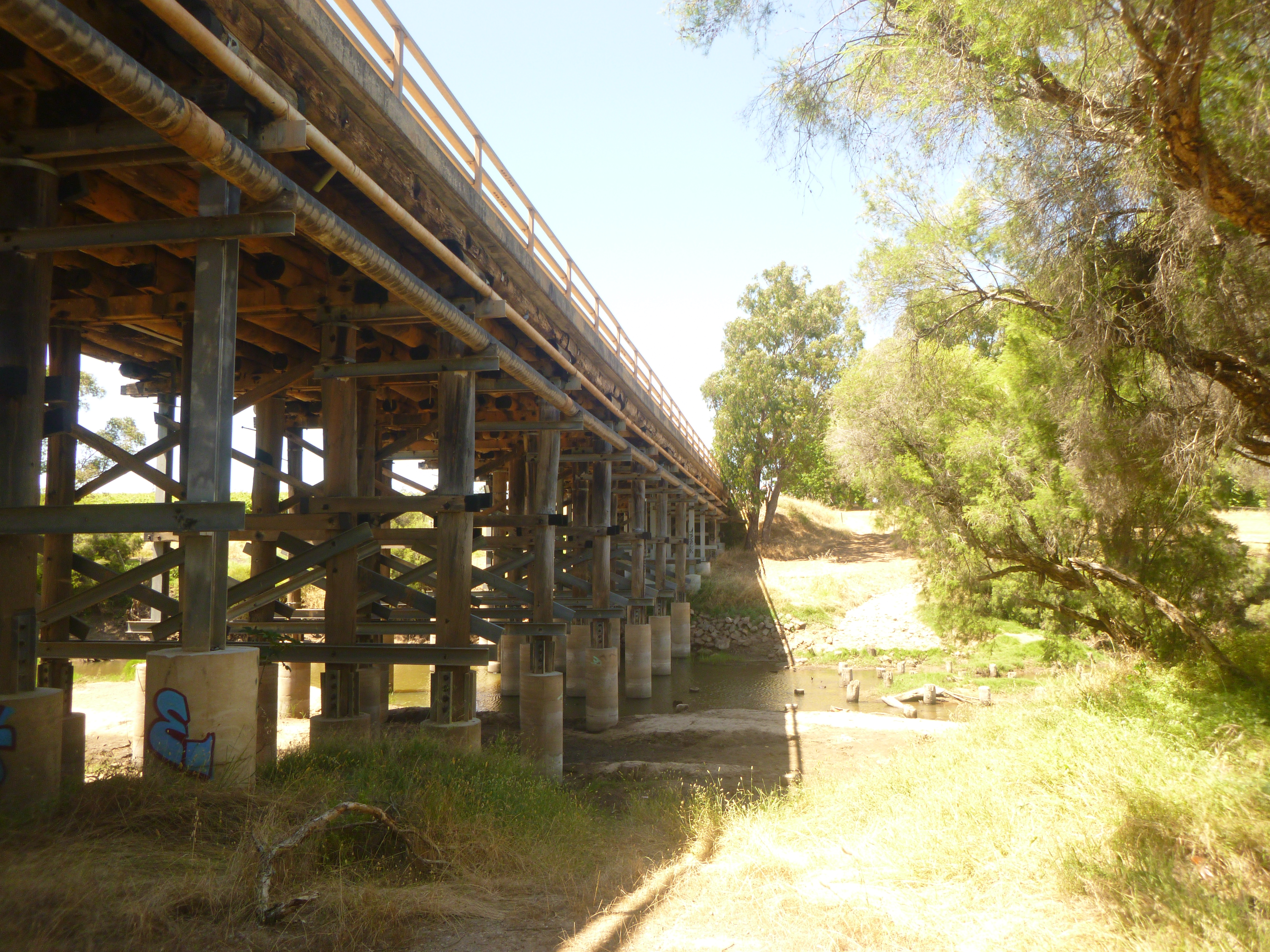
Yagan Bridge side by side with the sawn-off piles of the original Upper Swan Bridge

The Shire of Swan gazetted Upper Swan as a postal suburb in 1972. At this time, houses began to be constructed in the acreages around the rail siding, following the decommissioning of the rail siding in 1967. This established the area's first suburban community. Further changes came in 1988 when the portion of Upper Swan east of the river was excised to form the new locality of Brigadoon. During the same year, construction of The Vines country club and residential estate began on the western side of the Ellen Brook. The estate was subsequently also excised from Upper Swan in 1992, to form a part of the new locality of Ellenbrook.

Clay extraction operations, a common feature of Upper Swan, had begun to increase in both land holdings and business proponents throughout the 1980s, including companies such as Midland Brick, Bristile, Metro Brick and Prestige Brick. This led the Environmental Protection Authority to enforce stricter approval conditions to guarantee the protection of water relationships and the Western Swamp Turtle in the area.

Yagan Memorial Park, a tribute to the Noongar warrior Yagan was built in Belhus in 2010, close to the boundary with Upper Swan. The park was opened with a traditional reburial ceremony for Yagan. As part of the opening, the Upper Swan Bridge was renamed to the Yagan Bridge.

Following a re-zoning effort in 2015, a group of adjoining landowners on the banks of the Ellen Brook sold their Upper Swan holdings to Satterley to form the beginning of the Clementine Estate suburban development. The first lots at Clementine were released for sale in 2021.

== Geography ==
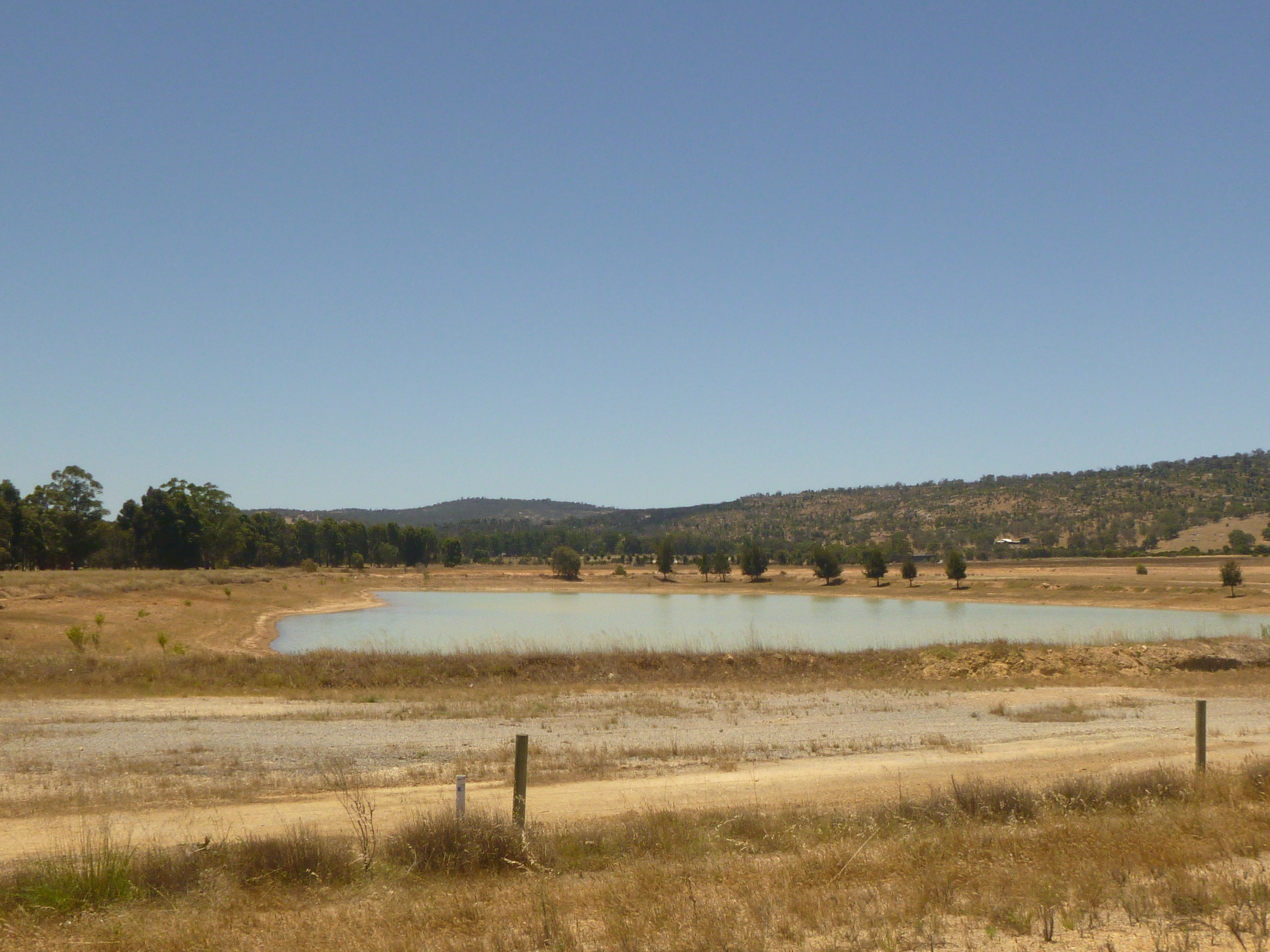
An ex-Metro Brick quarry on Coondaree Parade

Upper Swan is surrounded by the Swan River and the Ellen Brook waterways to the east, south and west, forming most of its boundary lines. Bullsbrook is located to the north. From 1972 until 1992, its boundaries also included The Vines, the northern half of Ellenbrook and most of Brigadoon.

The suburb is very large with a variety of active agricultural and industrial land uses. The portion south of the Swan River contains many wineries and hobby farms, functioning as a part of the Swan Valley tourism region. Dotted around the locality are various equestrian studs, agistments and riding schools on large rural lots. Several clay quarries and extraction pits operate in the vicinity of Great Northern Highway that have significantly altered the natural landscape, although owners Midland Brick have committed to rehabilitation of ex-quarries, along with donation of land holdings to create buffer zones.

The Ellen Brook Nature Reserve in the north of Upper Swan is an 83 hectare wetland conservation area, created in 1962. It is one of only two conservation habitats left for the critically endangered Western Swamp Turtle. The reserve is fenced off with no public access permitted.

Bells Rapids Park is located in the east, leading to Mount Mambup on the Darling Scarp. Pullman Park, a rehabilitated quarry area, is in the south below the Yagan Bridge. Almeria Park is built on what was originally the Upper Swan Siding. A substantial portion of the locality in the scarp to the east consists of uninhabited virgin bushland.

Topographically, most of Upper Swan is low-lying, sitting at an average of 20 metres above sea level within the flood plains of the Swan River. This drops further to only 11 metres immediately around the banks of the river. An exception is the area of the Darling Scarp, where Mount Mambup reaches a peak of 224 metres, dominating skyline views from most areas in the suburb.

== Demographics ==
At the 2021 Australian census, Upper Swan had a population of 549. The median age was 52, far higher than the state and national average of 38. The most common ancestries in Upper Swan were English (47.7%), Australian (36.1%), Scottish (9.8%), Irish (8.4%) and Italian (4.9%). 2.4% of residents identified as Aboriginal and/or Torres Strait Islander. 74.7% of residents were born in Australia.

=== Politics ===
Upper Swan is part of the Hasluck electorate at the federal level, and the Swan Hills district, at the state level. The suburb has one polling booth located at Upper Swan Primary School, covering Upper Swan and also adjacent rural areas in the Swan Valley.

2022 federal election Source: AEC
Liberal	44.32%
Labor	27.15%
Greens	6.59%
One Nation	3.99%
UAP	3.9%

2021 state election Source: WAEC
Labor	58.39%
Liberal	29.03%
Greens	2.76%
Christians	2.54%
NMV	1.66%

== Facilities ==
Upper Swan has three service stations on Great Northern Highway that provide light shopping and cafe options, including Ginger's Roadhouse which has been in continuous operation since the 1950s. Residents rely on the nearby centre of Ellenbrook for main line retail shopping, civic services and emergency services such as police, fire and ambulance.

Primary school students attend the nearby Upper Swan Primary School in the suburb, while high school students fall into the single catchment area of Aveley Secondary College in Ellenbrook.

Electricity is provided to the suburb from Western Power's Muchea substation. An NBN communications tower exists near Pullman Park, serving NBN's Fixed Wireless internet service to the majority of the suburb, as well as the adjoining areas of Belhus, Brigadoon and Bullsbrook.

== Transport ==
Upper Swan is dominated by Great Northern Highway (National Highway 95) which spans the locality from north to south. The highway links to Bullsbrook in the north and Midland to the south, across the Yagan Bridge. The only other arterial road is West Swan Road (State Route 52) in the south-west, which crosses the Ellen Brook and links to Ellenbrook. A minor access road, Railway Parade, links Upper Swan to the back of The Vines via a second road bridge over the brook. No roads traverse the Darling Scarp in this area.

Transwa provides a stop at Upper Swan for its Mid West regional coach routes to Moora, Geraldton and Kalbarri. The following Transperth metropolitan bus routes have stops at Upper Swan:

- 310 Upper Swan to Midland Station – serves Railway Parade, Apple Street and Great Northern Highway
- 311 Bullsbrook to Midland Station – serves Great Northern Highway

A road train assembly area exists on Apple Street for freight movements on the Perth to Darwin National Highway. The current Millendon to Narngulu railway line operates as a freight line for grain.
