= List of State Register of Heritage Places in the City of Swan =

The State Register of Heritage Places is maintained by the Heritage Council of Western Australia. As of 2026, 678 places are heritage-listed in the City of Swan, of which 317 are on the State Register of Heritage Places.

== List ==
The Western Australian State Register of Heritage Places, as of 2026, lists the following 317 state registered places within the City of Swan:

Place name	Place #	Co-ordinates	Street number	Street name	Suburb or town	Notes & former names	Photo
Westrail Training School	142	^{[?]}	Northern Junction	Meares & Victoria Streets	Guildford	Guildford Goods Shed (former)	
Guildford Convict Hiring Depot Site	686	^{[?]}	16	Meadow Street	Guildford	Pensioner Guard Cottages Site	
Three Houses	1271	31.901189°S 115.974293°E	60, 62 & 64	Helena Street	Guildford		
Turtons House	1641	31.895390°S 115.980940°E	11	Terrace Road	Guildford	Guildford Grammar School- Bursar's Office	
Church of the Good Shepherd	2458	31.900967°S 116.026877°E		Clayton Street	Bellevue		
Guildford Town Hall & Library	2460	31.899632°S 115.972071°E	Lot 188	James Street	Guildford	Council Chambers, Municipal Chambers	
St Mary's Church (Roman Catholic)	2461	31.899726°S 115.979285°E		James Street	Guildford		
Wesley Church and Manse (former)	2462	31.899891°S 115.972896°E	91	James Street	Guildford	Uniting Church, Methodist Church	
Guildford Hotel	2463	31.899654°S 115.968575°E	159-161	James Street	Guildford	Guildford Tavern	
The Old Bakery	2464	31.902166°S 115.969023°E	6	Johnson Street	Guildford		
Johnson's Complex	2465	31.900092°S 115.96928°E	32 & 34	Johnson Street	Guildford	Whiteman's House, Coach House & Cottage, former Seaton Ross & Whiteman's, Jane's Cottage	
Fairholme Group	2466	31.898221°S 115.962023°E	41	Market Street	Guildford	Welbourne House, Almond Grove, Nathaniel Harper Home, Fairholme	
Old Fairholme	2467	31.898221°S 115.962023°E	41	Market Street	Guildford		
Welbourne House	2468	31.898221°S 115.962023°E	41	Market Street	Guildford		
Garrick Theatre	2469	31.899936°S 115.972071°E	16	Meadow Street	Guildford	Infant Health Centre, former Commissariat Store & Quarters	
Guildford Grammar School	2470	31.895600°S 115.980000°E		Terrace Road	Guildford		
King's House and Shop	2472	31.900492°S 115.97109°E	11	Meadow Street	Guildford		
Lieutenant Du Cane's House	2473	31.900234°S 115.972072°E	14	Meadow Street	Guildford		
Mechanics' Institute, Guildford	2474	31.898426°S 115.972071°E		Meadow Street	Guildford	Swan Mechanics' Institute	
House, 25 Meadow Street, Guildford	2475	31.896233°S 115.971573°E	25	Meadow Street	Guildford		
Moulton's House (former)	2476	31.896228°S 115.971525°E	27	Meadow Street	Guildford		
St Charles Seminary	2477	31.895122°S 115.972777°E		Meadow Street	Guildford	Garden Hill	
Stirling Square	2478	31.89798°S 115.970162°E	Lot 191	Stirling Street	Guildford		
Guildford Court House and Gaol (former)	2479	31.897784°S 115.972068°E	Corner	Meadow & Swan Streets	Guildford		
Guildford Post Office	2480	31.898659°S 115.972071°E	24	Stirling Street	Guildford		
Rose and Crown Hotel	2481	31.898093°S 115.973483°E	105	Swan Street	Guildford		
St Matthews Church	2482	31.8983°S 115.9701°E		Stirling Square	Guildford	St Matthews Anglican Church	
Barker's Store & Warehouse	2483	31.896868°S 115.972071°E	124	Swan Street	Guildford	Chateau Guildford	
Crossland House (former)	2485	31.896984°S 115.970975°E	132	Swan Street	Guildford	Riversleigh	
Woodbridge Hotel	2486	31.897502°S 115.982276°E	50	East Street	Guildford	Woodbridge Tavern	
Guildford Grammar School Chapel	2487	31.894835°S 115.981161°E	11	Terrace Road	Guildford	Chapel of St Mary & St George	
House	2488	31.898152°S 115.967693°E	12	Victoria Street	Guildford		
Guppy's House	2489	31.89784°S 115.967197°E	18	Victoria Street	Guildford	Foothills School, Rohais, Well's Rest Home	
All Saints Anglican Church	2492	31.795841°S 116.004178°E	30	Henry Street	Henley Brook	All Saints Anglican Church & Graveyard	
Haddrill's House	2493	31.819966°S 116.006253°E	9010	West Swan Road	Henley Brook	Albion Town	
Spring Park	2494	31.81933°S 116.006836°E	9010 & 9170	West Swan Road	Henley Brook	Albion Town, Spring Park Stable, Spring Park Farm	
Oakover	2495	31.850537°S 115.999091°E	118	Dale Road	Middle Swan	Oakover Homestead, Stable & Barn	
St Mary's Church and Graveyard	2496	31.86033°S 116.005101°E	65	Yule Avenue	Middle Swan	St Mary's Anglican Church	
Houghton Homestead	2498	31.854612°S 115.998934°E	148	Dale Road	Middle Swan	Houghton Winery, Homestead & Stables	
Old Midland Junction School	2505	31.890022°S 116.006864°E	276	Great Eastern Highway	Midland	Helena Vale School, Midland High School, Midland Technical College, Midland Enterprise	
Midland Town Hall	2509	31.889643°S 116.001814°E	Lot 1740	Great Eastern Highway	Midland	Midland Junction War Memorial	
Council Club Hotel - Site of	2510	31.888428°S 116.003212°E	74	Helena Street	Midland		
Midland Courthouse (former)	2511	31.88916°S 116.00253°E	49	Helena Street	Midland	Midland Uniting Church	
Midland Post Office	2513	31.88946°S 116.002575°E	Corner	Helena Street & Great Eastern Highway	Midland	Midland Junction Lotteries House	
St Brigid's Catholic Church Group, Midland	2515	31.885521°S 116.004635°E	2	Dudley Street	Midland	Church (former), Mercy Convent, Church	
Midland Redevelopment Authority Offices	2516	31.893071°S 116.002284°E	Lot 707	Yelverton Drive	Midland	Railway Institute	
WAGR Chief Mechanical Engineer's Office	2517	31.893396°S 116.003571°E	60	Yelverton Drive	Midland		
Midland Railway Workshops Personnel War Memorial	2518	31.89352°S 116.004075°E	Lot 9029	Yelverton Drive	Midland	Western Australian Government Railway Workshops	
Woodbridge	2528	31.889018°S 115.986725°E		Third Avenue	Woodbridge		
Western Australian Bank (former)	2529	31.890995°S 116.007578°E	12	Cale Street	Midland	Police Department Regional Office, Midland Police Service Building	
Water Supply Office (former)	2530	31.889099°S 116.002388°E	Lot 8692	Great Northern Highway	Midland		
Belvoir Homestead Group	2531	31.790111°S 116.01822°E	1177	Great Northern Highway	Middle Swan		
Henry Bull's Cottage	2536	31.778482°S 115.999834°E	30	Corona Way	Belhus	Belhus Estate, Ellens Brook Homestead	
Guildford Historic Town	2915	31.900°S 115.973°E			Guildford	Mandoon	
Midland Railway Workshops	3273	31.894503°S 116.003275°E		Yelverton Drive	Midland & Woodbridge	Various Steam engines, carriages, vans, wagons, Western Australian Government Railway Workshops	
Residence (former Independent Chapel)	3275	31.897519°S 115.977649°E	49	Swan Street	Guildford	Independent Chapel (former)	
Scaddan House	3351	31.898106°S 115.982255°E	38	East Street	Guildford		
Schultz Residence	3432	31.897549°S 115.961748°E	45	Market Street	Guildford		
Shop	3493	31.899546°S 115.967077°E	187	James Street	Guildford		
Helena River Bridge	3531	31.906405°S 115.968658°E	Corner	Great Eastern Highway & Johnson Street	Guildford		
Barker's Bridge across Swan River	3532	31.894329°S 115.971696°E		Meadow Street/West Swan Road	Guildford	MRWA 919	
Lynwood Homestead ^{†}	3542	31.877771°S 116.010031°E	18	Great Northern Highway	Middle Swan		
Toodyay Red Hill Convict Road Station Ruins	3548	31.834597°S 116.080708°E		Toodyay Road, 7.3 km East of Roe Highway	Red Hill	Toodyay Greenmount Road Station	
Slovenian Hall	3614	31.899574°S 115.970080°E	129-33	James Street	Guildford	Regent Theatre and Gardens	
Meadow Street Precinct	4082	31.899303°S 115.971694°E		Meadow Street	Guildford	Guildford Conservation Area	
Banks of Swan River including Landing Place	4083	^{[?]}		Meadow Street	Guildford	Part of Meadow Street Precinct	
Mature Ficus Street Trees	4084	^{[?]}		Meadow Street	Guildford	Part of Meadow Street Precinct	
Stirling Arms Hotel	4085	31.899823°S 115.971502°E	117	James Street	Guildford		
House	4087	31.900284°S 115.967576°E	10	Ethel Street	Guildford		
Guildford Primary School	4088	31.902329°S 115.967888°E	Corner	Helena & Johnson Streets	Guildford	Guildford Public School, Boys' & Girls' School, Guildford State School	
Turners House	4089	31.901001°S 115.978499°E	16	Helena Street	Guildford		
Jecks Cottage	4090	31.902027°S 115.975312°E	49	Helena Street	Guildford		
Strathalbyne Residence	4091	31.901753°S 115.974217°E	63	Helena Street	Guildford		
Liverpool Arms Hotel (former)	4092	31.898859°S 115.980569°E	10	James Street	Guildford	Devenish Hotel (former)	
Brockman House (former)	4093	31.899615°S 115.969751°E	143	James Street	Guildford		
The Cliffe	4094	31.899658°S 115.973234°E	89	James Street	Guildford		
Joe Aguila Cottage	4095	31.901251°S 115.969468°E	1	Johnson Avenue	Guildford		
Cottage	4096	31.90032°S 115.969278°E	32	Johnson Street	Guildford		
House	4098	31.899868°S 115.973326°E	19	Olive Street	Guildford		
House, 4 Scott Street, Guildford	4099	31.901014°S 115.976086°E	4	Scott Street	Guildford		
The Oaks	4100	31.897612°S 115.977245°E	53	Swan Street	Guildford		
Longson House	4101	31.897508°S 115.975326°E	75	Swan Street	Guildford		
Padbury's Stores & Residence	4105	31.896763°S 115.97396°E	112-118	Terrace Road	Guildford		
Cottage & farm buildings	4106	31.893997°S 115.975165°E	106-108	Terrace Road	Guildford		
Kia-Ora Residence	4107	31.898427°S 115.975873°E	1	Waylen Street	Guildford		
Edward's House & Archaeological Sites	4112	31.812428°S 116.003714°E	9810	West Swan Road	Henley Brook	Clearwell, Richard Edward's House	
Susannah Smither's Grave	4113	31.819747°S 116.003614°E	9370	West Swan Road	Henley Brook		
House	4328	31.901788°S 115.974540°E	61	Helena Street	Guildford		
Oakover Vineyards, Gardens & River Meadows	4513	^{[?]}		Dale Road	Middle Swan		
Woodlands	4527	31.900172°S 115.964583°E	27	Market Street	Guildford		
House	4642	31.896349°S 115.983907°E	1-3	Turton Street	Guildford		
Guildford Cemetery	4647	31.919886°S 115.978546°E		Kalamunda Road	South Guildford	South Guildford Cemetery	
House	5173	31.895703°S 115.980640°E	13, 15 & 17	Terrace Road	Guildford		
Coral Tree	5175	^{[?]}	7	Matha Street	Guildford		
House	6092	31.895582°S 115.975983°E	82	Terrace Road	Guildford		
House	6093	31.897083°S 115.971226°E	130	Swan Street	Guildford		
House	6094	31.898489°S 115.975683°E	2	Stirling Street	Guildford		
House	6095	31.900163°S 115.966749°E	14	Stephen Street	Guildford		
House	6096	31.901174°S 115.977198°E	30	Helena Street	Guildford		
House	6098	31.896021°S 115.982914°E	12	Turton Street	Guildford		
House	6099	31.896546°S 115.976039°E	15	Waylen Street	Guildford		
Spring Reserve	6120	31.90084°S 115.970237°E	Corner	Helena & Banks Streets	Guildford	Listed under 6120 and 14783	
Sugar Gum Trees	7097	31.899216°S 115.972041°E		James Street	Guildford		
Guildford Fire Station & Quarters	8806	31.900862°S 115.972072°E	2	Meadow Street	Guildford		
Bebo Moro, Guildford	10181	31.896483°S 115.961414°E	224	Swan Street	Guildford	Bebe Moro (former), House Warehouse & Cellars	
Rectory	11517	31.899611°S 115.965628°E	219	James Street	Guildford		
Parish Hall	11518	31.898072°S 115.970015°E		Stirling Street	Guildford	Part of St Matthews Church precinct	
Guildford Railway Bridge over Swan River	13160	31.89949°S 115.96054°E		East Perth-Kalgoorlie Railway	Guildford		
Djooraminda	13191	^{[?]}			Guildford		
House	14327	31.897514°S 115.972192°E	119	Swan Street	Guildford	Police House	
House	14328	31.900516°S 115.973408°E	7	Olive Street	Guildford		
House	14329	31.897801°S 115.976017°E	9	Waylen Street	Guildford		
House	14330	31.895553°S 115.982204°E	70	East Street	Guildford		
House	14331	31.898208°S 115.976466°E	4	Waylen Street	Guildford		
House (former)	14332	31.899608°S 115.977735°E	43	James Street	Guildford	Eastern Hills Real Estate	
Carinya	14333	31.901694°S 115.976564°E	35	Helena Street	Guildford	West's House	
House	14335	31.896025°S 115.982669°E	16	Turton Street	Guildford		
House	14337	31.900731°S 115.965455°E	21	Market Street	Guildford		
House	14339	31.896372°S 115.978054°E	9	Station Street	Guildford		
Wellman House	14341	31.901107°S 115.965643°E	40	Helena Street	Guildford		
Pollard Nursing Home	14342	31.901080°S 115.976355°E	19	Market Street	Guildford		
House, 53 Helena Street, Guildford	14344	31.901894°S 115.974917°E	53	Helena Street	Guildford	Pensioner Guard Cottage	
House	14345	31.898158°S 115.974127°E	11	Hugh Street	Guildford		
House	14346	31.899851°S 115.964408°E	29a	Market Street	Guildford	Flour Mill (former)	
Swanleigh Precinct	14470	31.860643°S 116.008778°E		Yule Avenue	Middle Swan	Native & Half-caste Mission, Swan Boys' & Girls' orphanage, Swan Homes	
Guildford Road Bridge	14558	31.900254°S 115.961219°E		Guildford Road	Bassendean	MRWA 910, Bassendean Bridge, Guildford Road Bridge over Swan River	
Ellen's Brook Estate Homestead	14561	31.779412°S 116.000384°E	30	Corona Way	Belhus		
Ellen's Brook Estate Homestead Toilets	14563	31.779725°S 116.000593°E	30	Corona Way	Belhus		
Ellen's Brook Estate Machinery Shed	14567	31.778789°S 116.00059°E	30	Corona Way	Belhus		
Ellenbrook Estate Millstream Bridge	14568	31.78027°S 116.00092°E	12571	West Swan Road	Ellenbrook		
Shop (Retail/Commerce)	14669	31.889270°S 116.003025°E	46	Helena Street	Midland^{[A2]}		
House	14676	31.897112°S 115.969983°E	138	Swan Street	Guildford	Jeck's House	
House	14678	31.900461°S 115.964943°E	25	Market Street	Guildford		
House	14679	31.898101°S 115.963441°E	32	Market Street	Guildford		
House	14680	31.897534°S 115.962782°E	42	Market Street	Guildford	Brockman's House	
House	14681	31.895437°S 115.982691°E	5	Martha Street	Guildford		
House	14682	31.900987°S 115.971370°E	3	Meadow Street	Guildford		
House	14683	31.900653°S 115.971406°E	7	Meadow Street	Guildford		
House	14684	31.895986°S 115.971512°E	29	Meadow Street	Guildford		
House	14685	31.900429°S 115.971475°E	15	Meadow Street	Guildford		
House	14686	31.896554°S 115.971493°E	23	Meadow Street	Guildford		
House	14688	31.900651°S 115.973412°E	5	Olive Street	Guildford		
House	14689	31.900575°S 115.973694°E	6	Olive Street	Guildford		
House	14690	31.900463°S 115.973699°E	8	Olive Street	Guildford		
House	14691	31.900157°S 115.973688°E	14	Olive Street	Guildford		
House	14692	31.899808°S 115.973701°E	18	Olive Street	Guildford		
House	14693	31.898154°S 115.980511°E	5	Peel Street	Guildford		
House	14694	31.900845°S 115.975694°E	5	Scott Street	Guildford		
House	14695	31.900409°S 115.975714°E	13	Scott Street	Guildford		
House	14696	31.896980°S 115.978347°E	2	Station Street	Guildford		
House	14697	31.896698°S 115.978029°E	3	Station Street	Guildford		
House	14698	31.896592°S 115.978046°E	5	Station Street	Guildford		
House	14699	31.896385°S 115.978387°E	10	Station Street	Guildford	Masonic Hall	
House	14701	31.900253°S 115.966461°E	11	Stephen Street	Guildford		
House	14702	31.897565°S 115.983512°E	5	Water Street	Guildford		
House	14703	31.897454°S 115.983123°E	9	Water Street	Guildford		
House	14704	31.897498°S 115.981415°E	19	Swan Street	Guildford		
House	14705	31.896975°S 115.981483°E	20	Swan Street	Guildford		
House	14706	31.896966°S 115.980904°E	28	Swan Street	Guildford		
House	14707	31.896768°S 115.980497°E	30	Swan Street	Guildford		
House	14708	31.897488°S 115.978938°E	39	Swan Street	Guildford		
House	14709	31.897432°S 115.977403°E	51	Swan Street	Guildford		
House	14710	31.897005°S 115.977126°E	56	Swan Street	Guildford		
House	14711	31.897997°S 115.976829°E	57A	Swan Street	Guildford		
House	14712	31.896989°S 115.975671°E	72	Swan Street	Guildford		
House	14713	31.897467°S 115.975554°E	73	Swan Street	Guildford		
House	14714	31.895367°S 115.981078°E	9	Terrace Road	Guildford		
House	14715	31.895992°S 115.979068°E	10	Allpike Street	Guildford		
House	14716	31.895423°S 115.978483°E	45	Terrace Road	Guildford		
House	14717	31.900815°S 115.980419°E	9	East Street	Guildford		
House	14718	31.895423°S 115.978199°E	67	Terrace Road	Guildford		
Coachman's Cottage former Waterhall Estate	14720	31.900625°S 115.981144°E	16	East Street	Guildford		
House	14721	31.895495°S 115.976083°E	80	Terrace Road	Guildford		
House	14722	31.900416°S 115.980586°E	15	East Street	Guildford		
House	14723	31.899973°S 115.981719°E	22A	East Street	Guildford		
House	14724	31.896275°S 115.975722°E	93	Terrace Road	Guildford		
House	14726	31.896775°S 115.974924°E	103	Terrace Road	Guildford		
House	14727	31.896843°S 115.981688°E	18	Swan Street	Guildford		
House	14728	31.896569°S 115.981666°E	55	East Street	Guildford		
House	14729	31.896383°S 115.981679°E	57	East Street	Guildford		
Cora Lynn	14730	31.896005°S 115.983840°E	2	Turton Street	Guildford		
House	14731	31.896078°S 115.982231°E	62	East Street	Guildford		
House	14732	31.896317°S 115.983129°E	11	Turton Street	Guildford		
House	14733	31.900858°S 115.967259°E	1	Ethel Street	Guildford		
House	14734	31.896313°S 115.982860°E	13	Turton Street	Guildford	An Rich, The Flats or St Margaret's Maternity	
House	14735	31.896035°S 115.982811°E	14	Turton Street	Guildford		
House	14736	31.900556°S 115.967199°E	5	Ethel Street	Guildford		
House	14737	31.896369°S 115.982723°E	15	Turton Street	Guildford		
House	14738	31.900275°S 115.967257°E	9	Ethel Street	Guildford		
House	14739	31.896343°S 115.982595°E	17	Turton Street	Guildford		
House	14740	31.901670°S 115.978563°E	15	Helena Street	Guildford		
House	14741	31.898172°S 115.966924°E	20	Victoria Street	Guildford		
House	14742	31.901173°S 115.977891°E	20	Helena Street	Guildford		
House	14743	31.898187°S 115.966531°E	24	Victoria Street	Guildford		
House	14744	31.901174°S 115.977744°E	22	Helena Street	Guildford		
House	14745	31.898055°S 115.964562°E	46	Victoria Street	Guildford		
House	14747	31.901169°S 115.977599°E	24	Helena Street	Guildford		
House	14748	31.898158°S 115.976028°E	3	Waylen Street	Guildford		
House	14749	31.901177°S 115.977102°E	32	Helena Street	Guildford		
House	14753	31.898035°S 115.976042°E	5	Waylen Street	Guildford		
House	14754	31.898034°S 115.976431°E	6	Waylen Street	Guildford		
House	14755	31.897912°S 115.976017°E	7	Waylen Street	Guildford		
House	14756	31.901158°S 115.976604°E	36	Helena Street	Guildford		
House	14757	31.897902°S 115.976539°E	8	Waylen Street	Guildford		
House	14758	31.901226°S 115.976159°E	42	Helena Street	Guildford	Also listed under 14775	
House	14759	31.897754°S 115.976491°E	10	Waylen Street	Guildford		
House	14760	31.896564°S 115.976419°E	16	Waylen Street	Guildford		
House	14765	31.897018°S 115.976445°E	64	Swan Street	Guildford		
House	14770	31.900542°S 115.976851°E	5	Wellman Street	Guildford		
Bank of New South Wales (NSW) (former)	14774	31.899547°S 115.966736°E	197-199	James Street	Guildford	Shops Listed as both 14774 & 14827	
Bank of New South Wales (NSW) (former)	14775	31.901226°S 115.976159°E	42	Helena Street	Guildford	Residence, also listed under 14758	
House	14776	31.900221°S 115.976732°E	11	Wellman Street	Guildford		
House	14778	31.899637°S 115.963392°E	229	James Street	Guildford		
House	14782	31.901127°S 115.973751°E	66	Helena Street	Guildford	Annie's Cottage	
Spring Reserve	14783	31.90084°S 115.970237°E	Lot 144	Helena Street	Guildford	Listed under 6120 and 14783	
House	14786	31.901139°S 115.973388°E	74	Helena Street	Guildford		
House	14791	31.900396°S 115.968509°E	29	Johnson Street	Guildford		
House	14792	31.896358°S 115.971575°E	25-28	Meadow Street	Guildford		
House	14793	31.901173°S 115.968062°E	100	Helena Street	Guildford		
House	14794	31.896113°S 115.981669°E	61	East Street	Guildford		
House	14795	31.901162°S 115.967723°E	104	Helena Street	Guildford		
House	14796	31.895920°S 115.981670°E	63	East Street	Guildford		
House	14797	31.902251°S 115.966381°E	1	Hill Street	Guildford	Manning Home	
Gatekeeper's House (former)	14798	31.895824°S 115.981641°E	65	East Street	East Guildford		
House	14799	31.900242°S 115.974138°E	13	Hubert Street	Guildford		
House	14801	31.900073°S 115.974116°E	17	Hubert Street	Guildford		
House	14802	31.900031°S 115.974421°E	18	Hubert Street	Guildford		
House	14803	31.898499°S 115.974108°E	5	Hugh Street	Guildford		
House	14804	31.898058°S 115.974104°E	13	Hugh Street	Guildford		
House	14805	31.898996°S 115.981507°E	2	James Street	Guildford		
House	14806	31.899038°S 115.981210°E	4	James Street	Guildford		
House	14807	31.899562°S 115.980899°E	5	James Street	Guildford		
House	14808	31.899518°S 115.980655°E	9	James Street	Guildford		
House	14809	31.899044°S 115.980333°E	14	James Street	Guildford		
House	14810	31.899524°S 115.980246°E	15	James Street	Guildford		
House	14811	31.899922°S 115.975232°E	63-69	James Street	Guildford		
House	14812	31.899532°S 115.974612°E	75	James Street	Guildford		
House	14813	31.899585°S 115.974441°E	77	James Street	Guildford		
House	14814	31.899542°S 115.973422°E	87	James Street	Guildford		
Hotel	14815	31.899794°S 115.970990°E	Lot14	James Street	Guildford		
Theatre (Regents Theatre and Pic Gardens)	14816	31.899385°S 115.970036°E	129-133	James Street	Guildford	Museum of Natural History	
House	14817	31.899558°S 115.969911°E	141	James Street	Guildford		
Vaudeville Theatre (former)	14818	31.899684°S 115.968280°E	163	James Street	Guildford	Geoff's Smash Repairs	
Shops	14819	31.899541°S 115.969412°E	147-149A	James Street	Guildford	Same building as listed under 14820	
House	14820	31.899499°S 115.969428°E	149a	James Street	Guildford	Same building as listed under 14819	
Shops	14821	31.899539°S 115.967963°E	165	James Street	Guildford		
Shop	14822	31.899564°S 115.967958°E	167	James Street	Guildford		
Shop	14823	31.899564°S 115.967958°E	171	James Street	Guildford		
Shops	14824	31.899522°S 115.967849°E	173	James Street	Guildford		
Shop	14825	31.899564°S 115.9676328°E	175-179	James Street	Guildford		
Offices	14826	31.899576°S 115.966949°E	189-191	James Street	Guildford		
Shops	14827	31.899547°S 115.966736°E	197-199	James Street	Guildford	Lifestyle furniture, Guildford Milk Bar Listed as both 14774 & 14827	
Shops & House	14828	31.899514°S 115.966499°E	201	James Street	Guildford		
Shops & House	14829	31.899494°S 115.966401°E	205	James Street	Guildford		
House	14830	31.899533°S 115.966245°E	207	James Street	Guildford		
Honey Dew Cottage	14831	31.901042°S 115.969521°E	3	Johnson Avenue	Guildford		
Shop	14832	31.902234°S 115.968998°E	4	Johnson Street	Guildford		
House	14833	31.900818°S 115.966366°E	14	Market Street	Guildford	Rochdale	
House	14834	31.899992°S 115.973402°E	17	Olive Street	Guildford		
House	14835	31.898460°S 115.980546°E	1	Peel Street	Guildford		
House	14836	31.898595°S 115.973373°E	16	Stirling Street	Guildford		
House	14837	31.896927°S 115.983215°E	8	Water Street	Guildford		
House	14838	31.896893°S 115.983009°E	10	Water Street	Guildford		
House	14839	31.897473°S 115.982910°E	11	Water Street	Guildford	Duneam	
House	14840	31.896927°S 115.982866°E	12	Water Street	Guildford		
House	14841	31.896920°S 115.982654°E	14	Water Street	Guildford		
House	14842	31.897479°S 115.976448°E	65	Swan Street	Guildford		
House	14843	31.900459°S 115.978993°E	6	Attfield Street	Guildford		
House	14844	31.897724°S 115.974846°E	19	Bertie Street	Guildford		
Club House	14845	31.895826°S 115.976634°E	85	Terrace Road	Guildford		
Building Society	14847	31.899561°S 115.966016°E	215	James Street	Guildford		
House	14848	31.901177°S 115.977468°E	26	Helena Street	Guildford		
House	14849	31.901121°S 115.9728142°E	84	Helena Street	Guildford		
House	14850	31.901117°S 115.972625°E	86	Helena Street	Guildford		
House	14851	31.901113°S 115.972393°E	88	Helena Street	Guildford		
House	14852	31.900367°S 115.973686°E	10	Olive Street	Guildford		
House	14853	31.899906°S 115.974118°E	19	Hubert Street	Guildford		
House	14855	^{[?]}	50	Market Street	Guildford		
House	14856	31.900775°S 115.978983°E	2	Attfield Street	Guildford		
House	14858	31.903821°S 115.963673°E	Lot 192	Hill Street	Guildford		
House	14859	31.897001°S 115.975512°E	74	Swan Street	Guildford	Ercildoune	
House	17031	31.901711°S 115.980025°E	1	Helena Street	Guildford		
House	17032	31.901162°S 115.977328°E	28	Helena Street	Guildford		
House	17033	31.895373°S 115.980011°E	Lot 7	Terrace Road	Guildford		
House	17034	31.898047°S 115.964570°E	46	Victoria Street	Guildford	Demolished	
Guildford Railway Station Precinct	17684	31.8989°S 115.966°E	Lot 229	James Street	Guildford		
Chittering Park Homestead	17882	31.616791°S 116.10997°E	1104 & 1136	Chittering Road	Bullsbrook	Gartsford, Spring Valley	
Riverbank Detention Centre, Caversham	18404	31.88337°S 115.989071°E	130	Hamersley Road	Caversham	Pyrton, Riverbank Reformatory for Boys, Riverbank Secure Treatment Centre for Boys	
Sugar Gum Trees of Guildford	18844	^{[?]}		Stirling Square, James, Swan, Market, Meadow, Hill, Helena Streets	Guildford	Eucalyptus Cladocalyx	
Olive Farm Cellars, South Guildford	18879	31.915339°S 115.960564°E	12	Loder Way	South Guildford		
Guildford Gaol	23545	31.897865°S 115.972014°E	Lot 233	Meadow Street	Guildford		
Kings Meadow Oval	23547	31.903312°S 115.964614°E	Lot 192	Hill Street	Guildford	The Rec	
Kings Meadow Polo Ground	23551	31.903752°S 115.971607°E	Lot 234	Helena Street	Guildford	King Meadow, Kings Meadow Commonage	
Old Police Quarters	23554	31.898258°S 115.971937°E	22	Meadow Street	Guildford		
Henn's House	23555	31.895466°S 115.980017°E	Lot 4	Terrace Road	Guildford		
Fauntleroy Park	23558	31.898390°S 115.979874°E	Lot 34	Fauntleroy Street	Guildford		
Oakover Winery - Stable	23563	31.8504°S 115.99926°E	118	Dale Road	Middle Swan		
House	23567	31.895371°S 115.980322°E	17	Terrace Road	Guildford		
Oakover Winery - Barn	23568	31.850774°S 115.999418°E	118	Dale Road	Middle Swan		
Rose & Crown Cellars	23571	31.897833°S 115.973338°E	105	Swan Street	Guildford		
Oakover Winery - Shed	23575	31.850243°S 115.998944°E	118	Dale Road	Middle Swan		
House	23576	31.895418°S 115.980439°E	15	Terrace Road	Guildford		
House	23577	31.900142°S 115.974472°E	16	Hubert Street	Guildford		
House	23581	31.901192°S 115.974119°E	64	Helena Street	Guildford		
Ellen's Brook Estate - Homestead Kiln	23583	31.779851°S 116.000681°E	30	Corona Way	Belhus		
St Brigid's Church	23584	31.885851°S 116.004269°E	3	St Brigid's Place	Midland		
Houghton Winery - Timber House	23585	31.854066°S 115.998084°E	148	Dale Road	Middle Swan		
Ellen's Brook Estate - Cape Lilac Tree	23596	31.779366°S 116.000563°E	30	Corona Way	Belhus		
Ellen's Brook Estate - Worker's Quarters	23601	31.779074°S 116.000212°E	30	Corona Way	Belhus		
Houghton Winery - Stables/Worker's Quarters	23606	31.853765°S 115.998534°E	148	Dale Road	Middle Swan		
House	23614	31.901174°S 115.974441°E	62	Helena Street	Guildford		
House	24412	31.895432°S 115.980818°E	13	Terrace Road	Guildford		
Fairholme	24487	31.898448°S 115.962478°E	41	Market Street	Guildford		
Oakover Homestead	24507	31.850494°S 115.998788°E	118	Dale Road	Middle Swan		
Boundary Tree, Swan Locations 4 and 5, Baskerville	25111	31.793155°S 116.0113°E		Memorial Avenue	Baskerville	Stirling Tree	
St Charles Seminary and Grounds	25629	31.895466°S 115.973078°E	30	Meadow Street	Guildford		
Kingsbury Cottage	25974	31.900487°S 115.966791°E	8	Stephen Street	Guildford		

=== Notes ===
- ^[?]No coordinates specified by Inherit database
- ^[2]Inherit quotes Guildford as the suburb it is located in but shows Midland on the map, as does the City of Swan 2026 Local Heritage Survey
- ^{†} Denotes building has been demolished
