= The Vines Resort =

Golf club in Perth, Western Australia

- Interactive map of The Vines Resort
- 31.757°S 116.003°E

Club information
- Location: The Vines, Western Australia
- Established: 1989; 37 years ago
- Type: Public
- Owner: The Vines (WA) Pty Ltd
- Tota holes: 36
- Tournaments: Vines Classic (1990-1992); Heineken Classic (1993-2001); Johnnie Walker Classic (2006, 2009); Lexus Cup (2007)
- Website: vines.com.au

The Lakes Course
- Designed by: Graham Marsh & Ross Watson
- Par: 72
- Length: 6,497 m (7,105 yd)

Ellenbrook Course
- Designed by: Graham Marsh & Ross Watson
- Par: 72
- Length: 6,541 m (7,153 yd)

The Vines Resort (formerly The Vines Resort & Country Club) is a public golf course and leisure complex in Perth, Western Australia. The resort hosts two championship-tier 18-hole courses, The Lakes course and the Ellenbrook course, along with an open-air driving range and a mini-golf course. It is located in The Vines, a residential suburb of the same name in Perth's Swan Valley region.

== History ==
The Vines was created in 1988 by Japanese developer Sanwa Vines Pty Ltd, with architects Graham Marsh and Ross Watson commissioned to design the course layouts. Stage one of construction included three 9-hole golf courses, clubhouses, leisure facilities and 56 serviced apartments. A grand opening party was held in September 1989, followed by the new Vines Classic annual golf tournament in 1990.

Stage two of the resort project began in 1993, adding a fourth 9-hole course to create two combined 18-hole championship tier courses. The eastern 18 hole course was named the Ellenbrook Course, while the western course was named The Lakes Course. The expansion also increased the resort's hospitality offering, with a new 103-room hotel, which was sold to Kishu Railway Company Pty Ltd upon completion in 1997. Accor was appointed to manage the hotel as the Novotel Vines Resort.

Sanwa retained ownership of the resort until 2005, when they divested all of their remaining interests in The Vines to Kishu Railway Company. Kishu rebranded its Australian subsidiary as The Vines (WA) Pty Ltd shortly after the acquisition.

A second Accor hotel, Grand Mercure The Vines Apartments, opened in the east side of the resort in 2007, consisting of 32 serviced apartments. It was later rebranded as The Sebel Swan Valley.

== Tournaments hosted ==
- 1990 Vines Classic
- 1991 Vines Classic
- 1992 Vines Classic
- 1993 Heineken Classic
- 1994 Heineken Classic
- 1995 Heineken Classic
- 1996 Heineken Classic
- 1997 Heineken Classic
- 1998 Heineken Classic
- 1999 Heineken Classic
- 2000 Heineken Classic
- 2001 Heineken Classic
- 2006 Johnnie Walker Classic
- 2007 Lexus Cup
- 2009 Johnnie Walker Classic

== Facilities ==
The Vines functions as a tourist and hospitality destination within the context of the larger Swan Valley region. The resort and country club is rated four-stars and encompasses two hotels: Novotel The Vines Resort with 103 hotel rooms and 52 serviced apartments, plus The Sebel Swan Valley and its 32 serviced apartments.

Various leisure and sports facilities are provided at the resort, including a gymnasium, four outdoor tennis courts, indoor squash courts, a bowling green, a 25m swimming pool and an outdoor spa. The resort also hosts two bars and restaurants, two cafes, five function rooms and a chapel, making it a popular destination for weddings, events and entertainment, in line with other venues in the Swan Valley.

== Courses ==
Conservation was a primary focus during design and construction of the golf course. The fairways were banked with clay to prevent chemical leaching into the nearby Ellen Brook waterways. Native wild kangaroos are retained and allowed to roam freely on and off the courses.

=== Scorecards ===
All measurements are taken from the black championship tees:

The Lakes Course
Hole #	Par	Metres
1	4	349
2	4	363
3	5	473
4	3	203
5	4	391
6	5	545
7	3	179
8	4	396
9	4	356
Out	36	3255
10	5	493
11	4	391
12	4	396
13	3	156
14	4	359
15	4	407
16	3	179
17	4	391
18	5	470
In	36	3242
Total	72	6497

Ellenbrook Course
Hole #	Par	Metres
1	4	377
2	4	343
3	5	531
4	4	378
5	3	174
6	4	387
7	4	378
8	3	161
9	5	523
In	36	3252
10	4	372
11	4	362
12	5	538
13	3	229
14	4	358
15	4	397
16	4	378
17	3	178
18	5	477
In	36	3289
Total	72	6541
