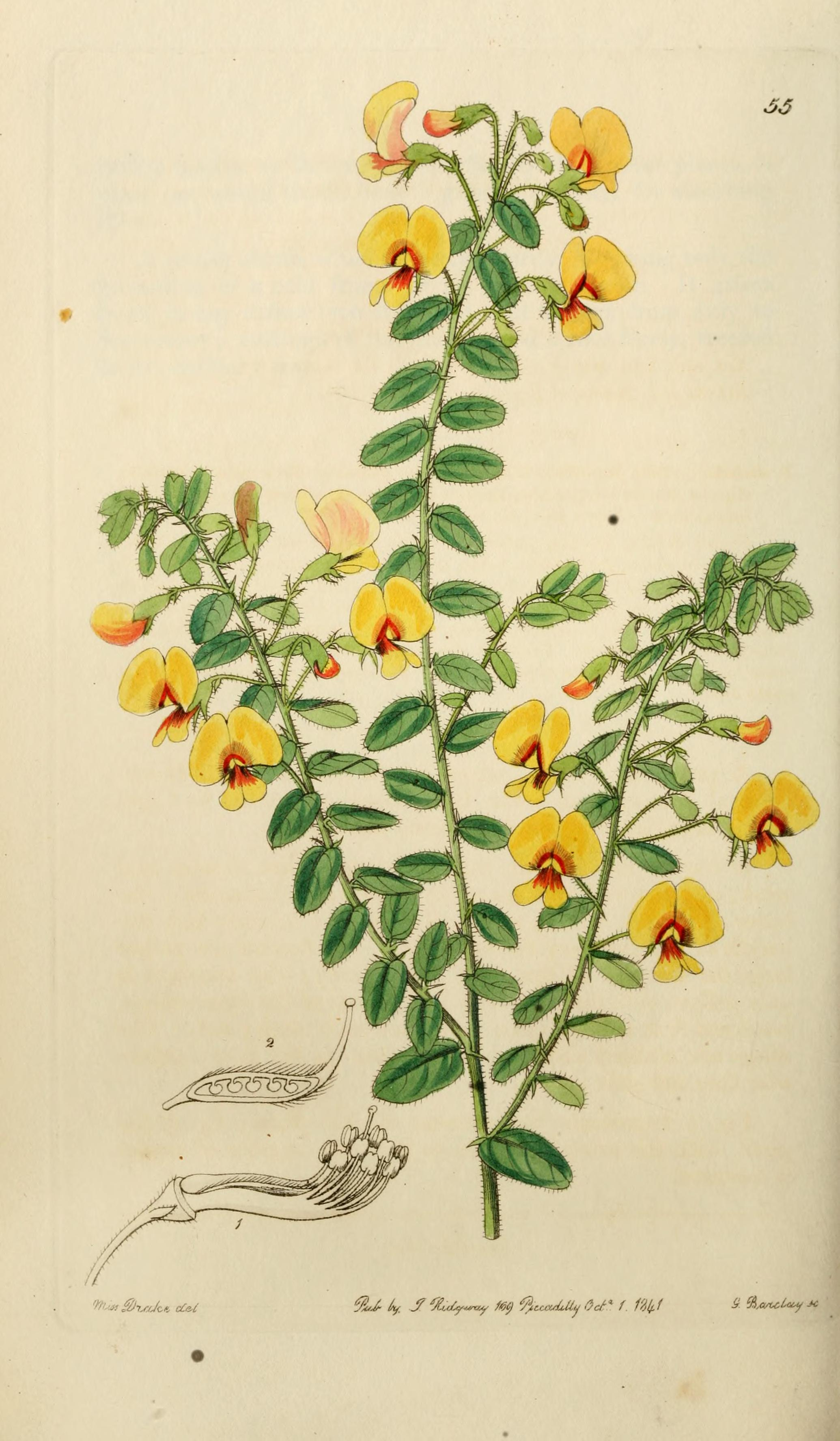
- Illustration by Sarah Drake in The Botanical Register

Scientific classification
- Kingdom: Plantae
- Clade: Tracheophytes
- Clade: Angiosperms
- Clade: Eudicots
- Clade: Rosids
- Order: Fabales
- Family: Fabaceae
- Subfamily: Faboideae
- Genus: Bossiaea
- Species: B. disticha

Binomial name
- Bossiaea disticha Lindl.

= Bossiaea disticha =

Species of flowering plant

Bossiaea disticha is a species of flowering plant in the family Fabaceae and is endemic to the far southwest of Western Australia. It is a weak, slender shrub with oblong to egg-shaped leaves and bright yellow and red flowers.

== Description ==
Bossiaea disticha is a weak shrub that typically grows to a height of up to 1.5 m (4 ft 11 in) high, with thin weak, hairy branchlets. The leaves are arranged alternately, oblong to egg-shaped, 10–20 mm (0.39–0.79 in) long and 1.7–7 mm (0.067–0.276 in) wide on a petiole up to 1.0 mm (0.039 in) long with a narrow egg-shaped stipule up to 1.8 mm (0.071 in) long at the base. The flowers are usually arranged singly or in pairs, each flower on a pedicel 7–14 mm (0.28–0.55 in) long with egg-shaped bracts 0.7–1.8 mm (0.028–0.071 in) long attached. The five sepals are joined at the base forming a tube 2.8–3.7 mm (0.11–0.15 in) long, the two upper lobes 2.2–2.7 mm (0.087–0.106 in) long and the three lower lobes 1.5–2.8 mm (0.059–0.110 in) long. There are bracteoles 1–2 mm (0.039–0.079 in) long at the base of the sepal tube. The standard petal is bright yellow with a red base and 10.0–13.5 mm (0.39–0.53 in) long, the wings yellow with a purpish-brown base and 11.2–11.4 mm (0.44–0.45 in) long, the keel greenish-white with a red tip and 10–11.0 mm (0.39–0.43 in) long. Flowering occurs from September to November and the fruit is an oblong pod 15–22 mm (0.59–0.87 in) long.

== Taxonomy and naming ==
Bossiaea disticha was first formally described in 1841 by John Lindley in Edwards's Botanical Register. Lindley described it as "A pretty little shrub, raised in the garden of the Horticultural Society from Swan River seed, presented by Capt. James Mangles R.N. and flowering in March". The specific epithet (disticha) means "in two rows", referring to the leaves.

== Distribution and habitat ==
This bossiaea is common in the understorey of forest, woodland and heath from near Ellen Brook in the north to Cape Leeuwin, in the Jarrah Forest and Warren biogeographic regions of far south-western Western Australia.

== Conservation status ==
Bossiaea disticha is classified as "not threatened" by the Government of Western Australia Department of Parks and Wildlife.
