= The Vines, Western Australia =

The Vines
- Suburb
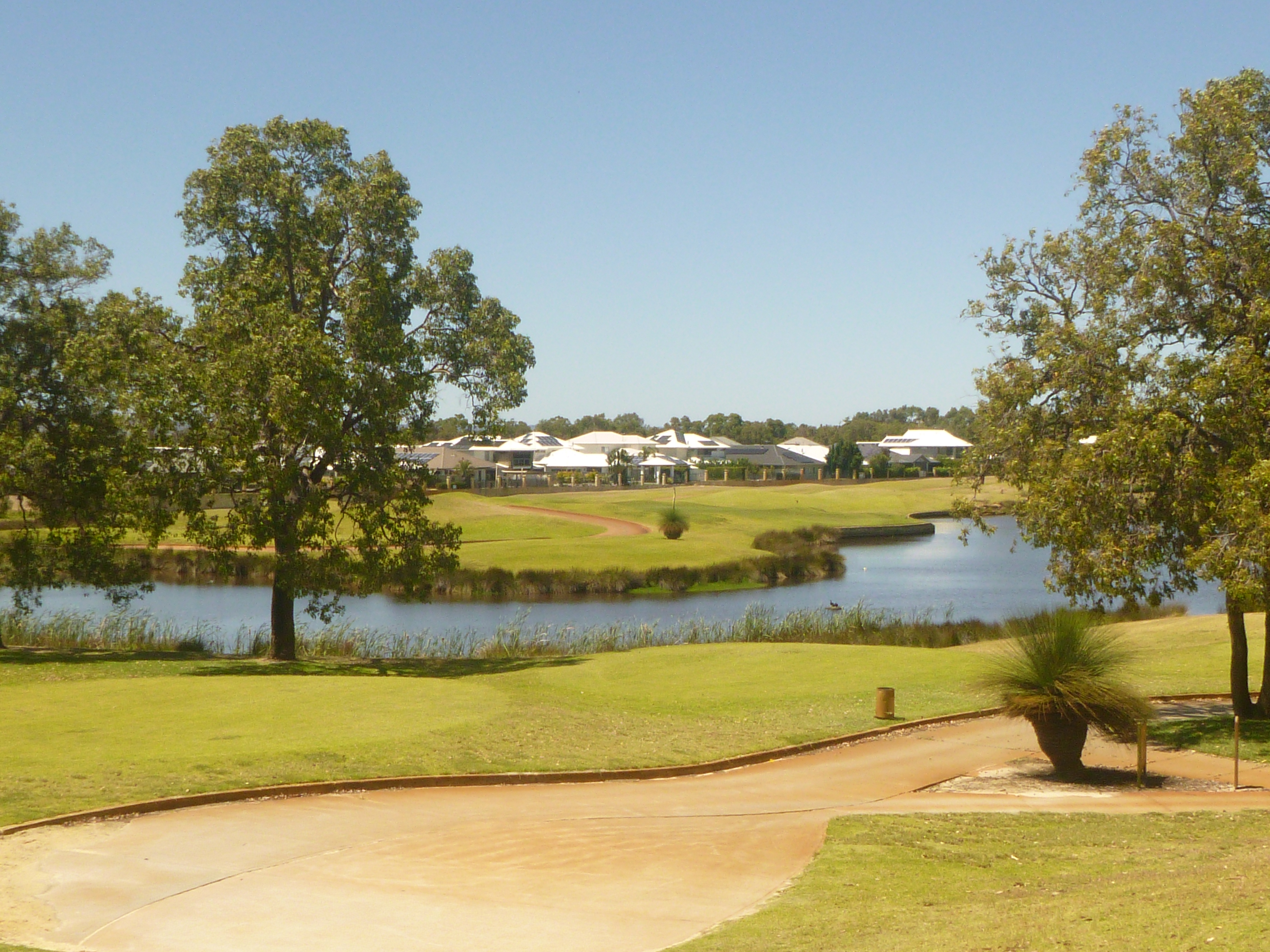
- The Reserve estate on the Ellenbrook course
- Interactive map of The Vines
- Coordinates: 31.757°S 116.003°E
- Country: Australia
- State: Western Australia
- City: Perth
- LGA: City of Swan
- Established: 1996

Government
  - State electorate: Swan Hills
  - Federal division: Hasluck

Area
  - Total: 6.6 km^{2} (2.5 sq mi)

Population
  - Total: 5,848 (SAL 2021)
- Postcode: 6069
Suburbs around The Vines
Ellenbrook	Ellenbrook	Upper Swan
Ellenbrook	The Vines	Upper Swan
Aveley	Belhus	Upper Swan

The Vines is an outer suburb of Perth, Western Australia, located north-east in the Swan Valley region of the City of Swan. It is 33 kilometres (21 mi) away from Perth's central business district and 6 kilometres (4 mi) away from the secondary metropolitan centre of Ellenbrook, with which it shares a common development history and urban area.

The suburb is primarily rural-residential in nature. Its streets and neighbourhoods are defined by The Vines Resort, a resort and leisure complex featuring two 18-hole golf courses that traverse the majority of the suburb's area.

== History ==
=== Name ===
The suburb of The Vines was named after The Vines Resort & Country Club, which in turn, was named after a former vineyard in the Upper Swan area. A prominent viticultural theme is also present in the suburb's road names, such as Bordeaux Lane, Chardonnay Drive and Muscat Terrace.

=== Early history ===
The Ellen Brook and its tributaries were used by Whadjuk Noongar people for hunting and camping, and were known to be associated with the mythology of the Wagyl. A remnant aboriginal artefact scatter site, DAA ID 3535, was identified by surveyors on Ellen Brook Drive, on the banks of the brook in the far south-east corner of The Vines.

At the foundation of the British Swan River Colony in 1829, the Ellen Brook and its southern catchment became part of a 15,000-acre land parcel known as Swan Location 1. Pioneer settler Henry Bull took ownership of the northern half of Swan Location 1 containing The Vines, which he named "Woburn Park", while the southern half became Belhus. Upon leaving the Swan River in 1848, Bull delegated Woburn Park to be managed by agents on his behalf. The area then fell into the local governance of the Swan Road District after it was established in 1871.

A family known as the Howarths ran a farm and vineyard near modern-day Ellen Brook Drive for many years, but struggled with logistics and isolation, ultimately abandoning the area in the 1950s. In the north east, an equestrian stud farm for breeding and training of horses was founded on Railway Parade. A dam was built across Sawpit Gully, creating a lake and water supply for the estate. These were the only notable land uses in The Vines prior to suburban development.

The Woburn Park area, by this point subdivided, became the new postal locality of Upper Swan in 1972.

=== Modern development ===
The foundation of the suburb began in 1987, when Japanese developer Sanwa Vines Pty Ltd purchased 1,200 hectares of greenfield land in what is now The Vines and the northern half of Ellenbrook. Their primary interest was to develop new residential estates and explore tourism opportunities.

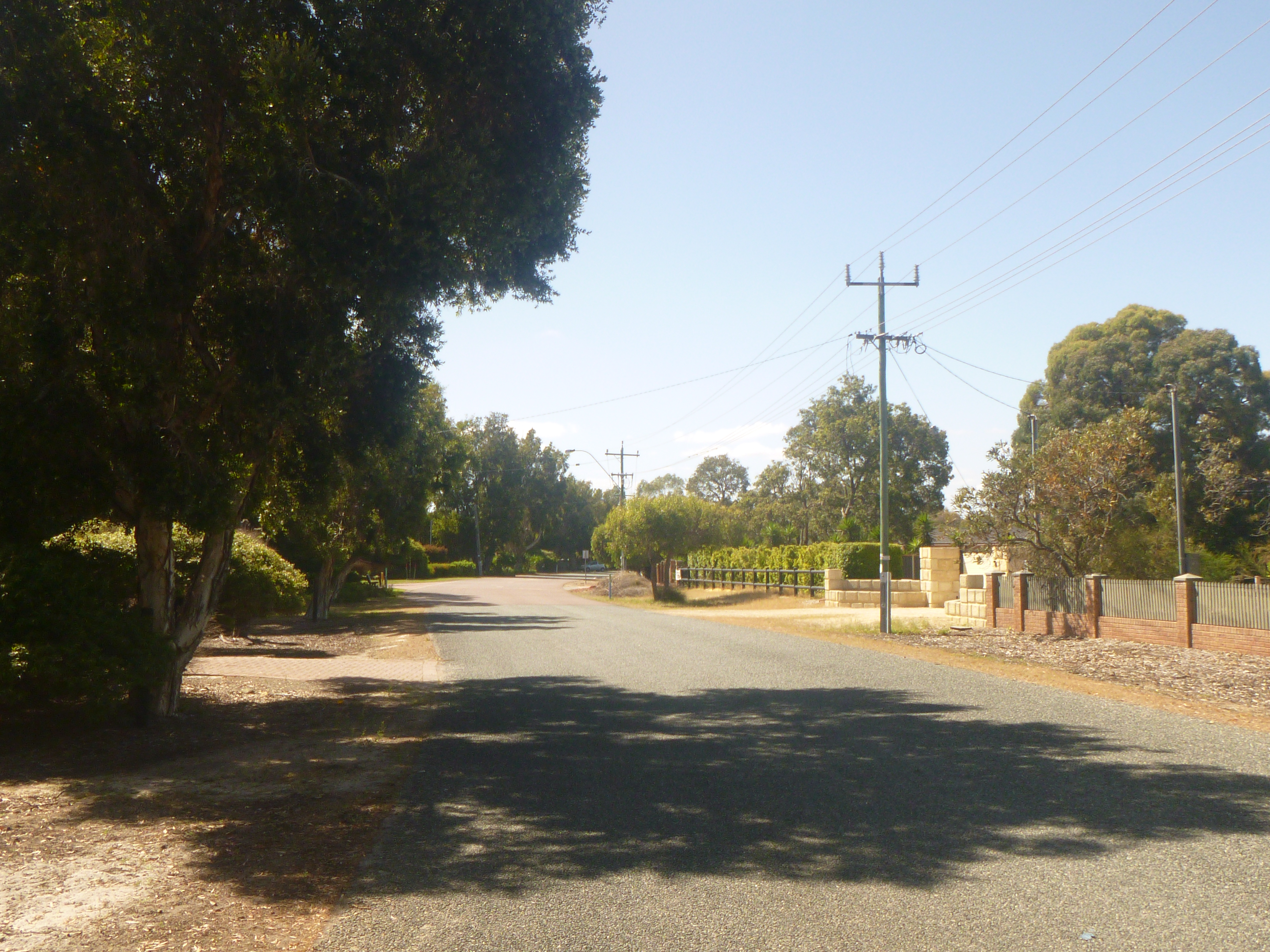
Chardonnay Drive, facing south

With the State Government fast-tracking planning and approvals, and also contributing towards sewerage and electrical infrastructure, Sanwa began stage one of the new Vines Resort & Country Club project in 1988. It included construction of the resort buildings and facilities, a 27 hole golf course and most of the new suburb's roads. 390 one acre residential lots around the golf course were released for sale in late 1989, following the resort's opening.

A few years later in 1992, The Vines was moved from Upper Swan to Ellenbrook, a newly gazetted locality for Sanwa's upcoming Ellenbrook joint venture. Stage two of The Vines Resort & Country Club project began at this time, building an extra 9 hole course to create two combined 18-hole courses. A new 103-room Novotel hotel was also added, which finished construction in late 1996.

219 hectares of undeveloped land in the suburb was re-zoned from rural to urban by the Western Australian Planning Commission in 1994, starting the trend towards smaller lots and denser, more urban neighbourhoods in The Vines. The first new estate to be released was The Mews in 1996.

Residents of the area founded a neighbourhood association, The Vines Property Owners’ Association, in 1995. A petition from the association in 1996 led to the area being separated into its own dedicated postal suburb named "The Vines", taking the name of the resort.

Sanwa divested all of their remaining land holdings in the year 2000 to The Mews Joint Venture, a property and investment syndicate represented by land developers LWP Property Group Pty Ltd. This led to a series of new urban estates, such as Pavilion Circle, Woburn Park (named after the colonial estate) and The Reserve, being designed, released and built up throughout the 2000s and the 2010s.

In 2012, the equestrian estate on Railway Parade was purchased by Investa Property Group, who subdivided it and released it as the Equis Lake estate. The dam over Sawpit Gully was re-built as a road bridge on Dalmilling Drive. In 2015, the remainder of the Equis Lake project was acquired by LWP Property Group for completion.

== Geography ==
There are many prominent waterways in The Vines. Its eastern boundary runs along the foreshore of the Ellen Brook, which separates the suburb from Upper Swan on the other side and provides wetland habitats for native wildlife. The habitat continues along Sawpit Gully, which forms part of the northern boundary with Ellenbrook. The golf courses feature wetlands, streams and lakes, which are often used by helitacks to collect water for firefighting.

The golf course fairways also feature abundant native tree canopy, acting as a green belt. The mature tree stock is also reflected throughout The Vines' road verges and in most of the properties that surround the golf courses, reaching 15% tree canopy coverage of the suburb. Bush Forever Site 23 is a 50-acre remnant bushland reserve in the west, known as the Cardinal Drive Bushland.

Topographically, The Vines sits on a gradual incline that descends towards the Ellen Brook valley. The west of the suburb sits at 30 metres above sea level, dropping to 20 metres in the east around the brook and the Sawpit Gully.

== Neighbourhood ==
=== Estates ===
At the suburb's inception in 1989, The Vines comprised 390 one-acre lots (4000m^{2}), most of which face onto the original 27 holes of the golf course. All are zoned 'rural' with a low allowed residential density of R2.5 in the Metropolitan Region Scheme.

Over time, new infill estates and subdivisions have been added to The Vines, featuring smaller lot sizes and higher density of dwellings, whilst often retaining the same golf course amenities as the acreages:

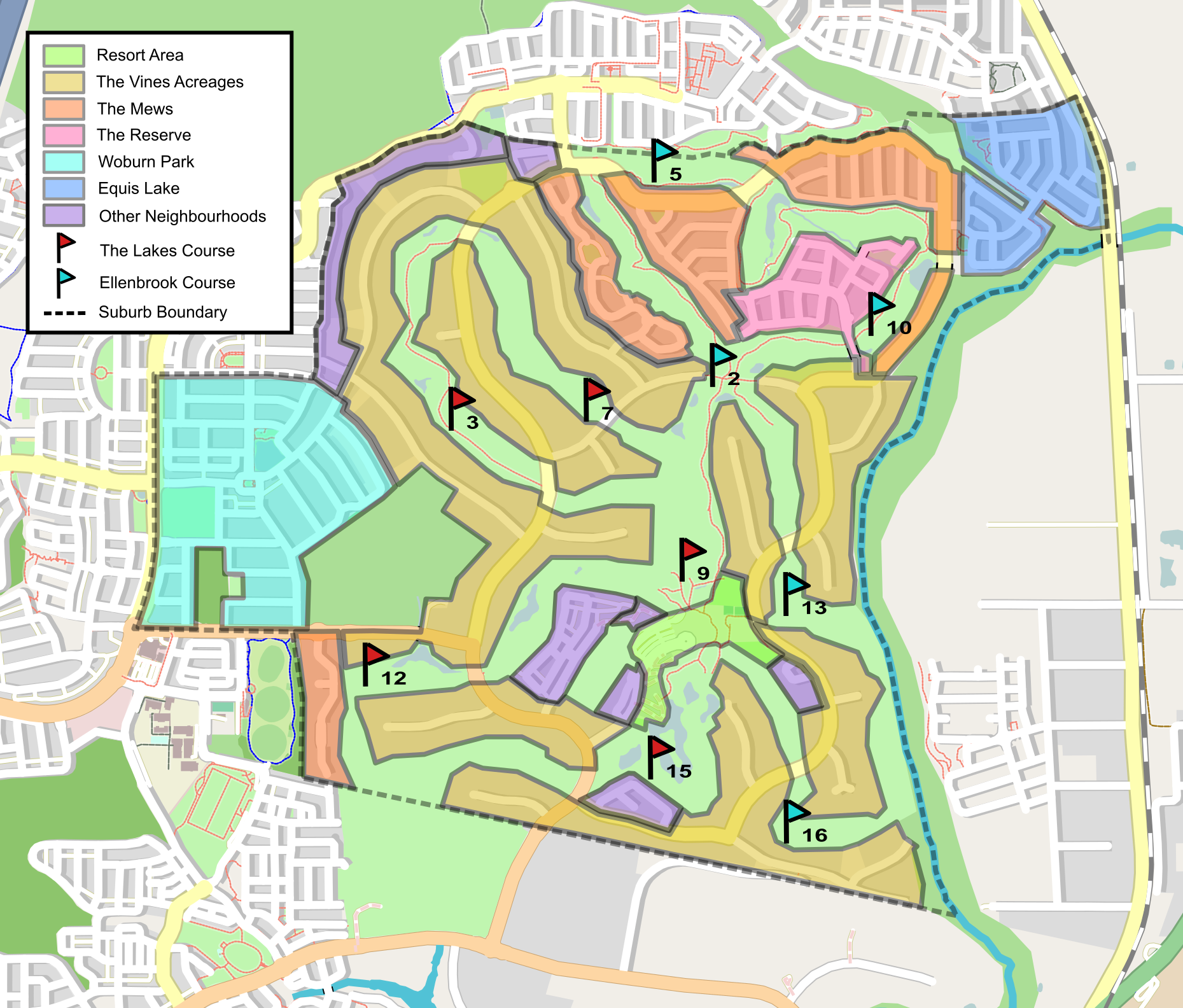
Neighbourhood map of The Vines

Neighbourhood	First Release	Dwellings	Density
The Mews	1996	418	R5-R20
Lakefront Circle	1996	90	R40
The Fairways	1999	35	R40
The Tenth Tee	2001	24	R40
Pavilion Circle	2004	138	R25
Woburn Park	2007	440	R10-R25
The Reserve	2012	176	R20
Equis Lake	2012	283	R20-R25
Lexia ^{a}	2013	16	R10
Hermitage Green	2017	14	R40
Annie's Landing ^{a}	2017	13	R5
Wedgewood Grove	2019	23	R25

^a: These are primarily estates of Ellenbrook, with only minor portions present in The Vines

=== Neighbourhood groups ===
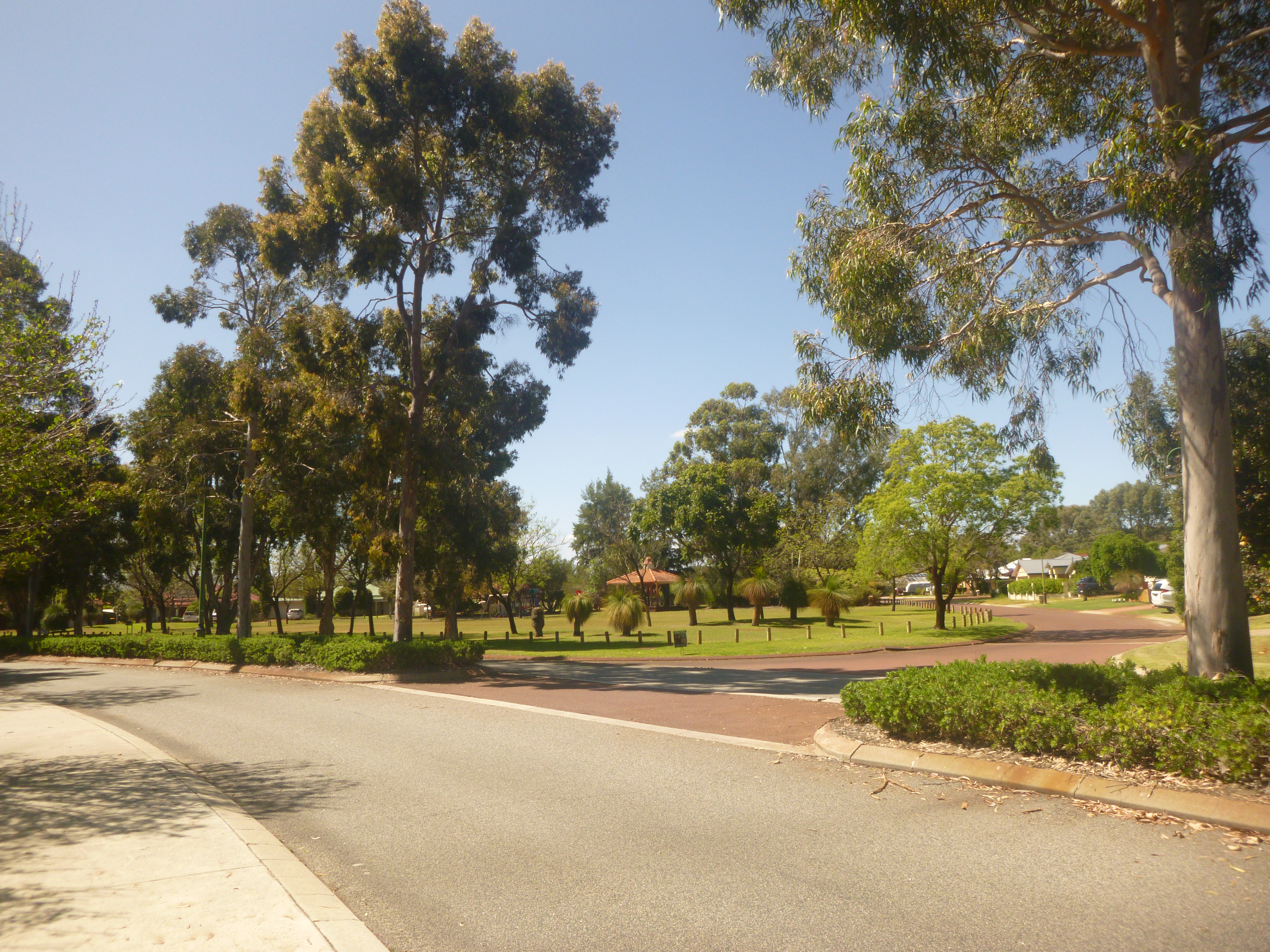
Vines Avenue near The Mews estate

The Vines has a neighbourhood association, The Vines Residents and Ratepayers Association (VRRA). Its primary purpose is to advocate for the best town planning outcomes, but it also manages free public events for the area such as cinema nights and barbecues. The association also runs the Friends of The Vines Bushland group, a volunteer group dedicated to nurturing and cleaning the Bordeaux Lane reserve.

=== Town planning ===
Suburban development in The Vines is guided by the City of Swan's 'The Vines Outline Development Plan No. 37' document, which itself is informed by the City's larger Local Planning Scheme No. 17 framework. The suburb is entirely zoned as 'Special Use' to allow for its tourism and recreational land uses. The Vines is also considered part of the City's defined 'Ellenbrook Local Area' for community engagement purposes.

== Demographics ==
At the 2021 Australian census, The Vines had a population of 5,848. 50.3% of residents were male and 49.7% were female. The median age was 39, in line with the state and national average of 38. The most common ancestries in The Vines as of 2021 were English (45%), Australian (30.7%), Scottish (10.5%), Irish (8.4%) and Italian (5.4%), with 2.2% of residents identifying as Aboriginal and/or Torres Strait Islander. 62% of residents were born in Australia.

== Services and amenities ==
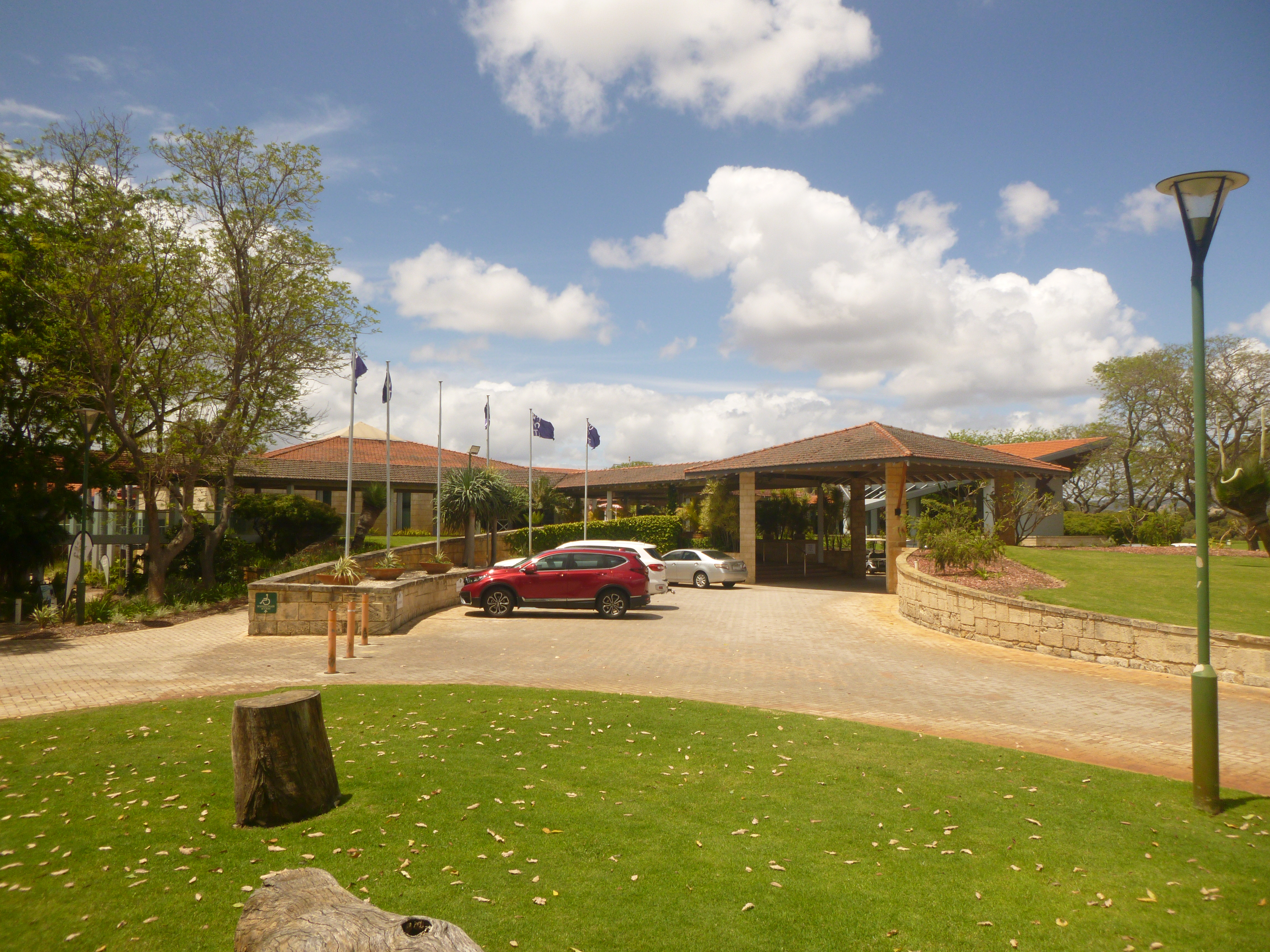
The Vines Resort buildings

The Vines possesses hospitality and lifestyle options as part of its Swan Valley tourism offering. The resort hosts two bars & restaurants and two cafes that are all open to the public. Club members and hotel guests have access to various leisure and sports facilities, including a gymnasium, tennis courts, a bowling green and a 25m swimming pool.

Outside of the resort, land use in The Vines is strictly residential and there are no shops, schools or civic services within the suburb boundaries. The nearest retail and civic centre is Ellenbrook to the west; in particular, its District Centre area on Bordeaux Lane, which abuts the suburb's western boundary.

Police, fire and ambulance services are all provided from local stations in Ellenbrook. The primary school catchment area is split along a north-south line between Anne Hamersley Primary School in Ellenbrook and Aveley North Primary School in Aveley respectively. High school students fall into the single catchment area of Aveley Secondary College.

Electricity is supplied to the suburb mostly via Western Power's Henley Brook substation. A small area in the south-east on Ellen Brook Drive is supplied from the Muchea substation.

== Transport ==
=== Roads ===
The suburb has four local distributor roads - Vines Avenue, Roxburghe Drive, Hermitage Drive and Ellen Brook Drive - which all function together as a ring road around the perimeter of the suburb and golf courses. A fifth local distributor, Bordeaux Lane, links The Vines to the road network in Ellenbrook. The nearest arterial highway is West Swan Road (State Route 52) in Belhus, accessed via Chateau Place and Millhouse Road.

=== Bus and train ===
The Vines is not directly served by public transport. The nearest Transperth railway station and public transport hub is Ellenbrook station. There are three Transperth bus routes to Ellenbrook station that skirt the suburb's boundaries - the 340 in the north serving Woburn Park and Equis Lake, and the 310 and 345 in Belhus to the south. Additionally, Transperth operates four school specials for local schools, the 740, 758, 759 and 760, all of which traverse the whole suburb.
