= Belhus, Western Australia =

Belhus Perth, Western Australia
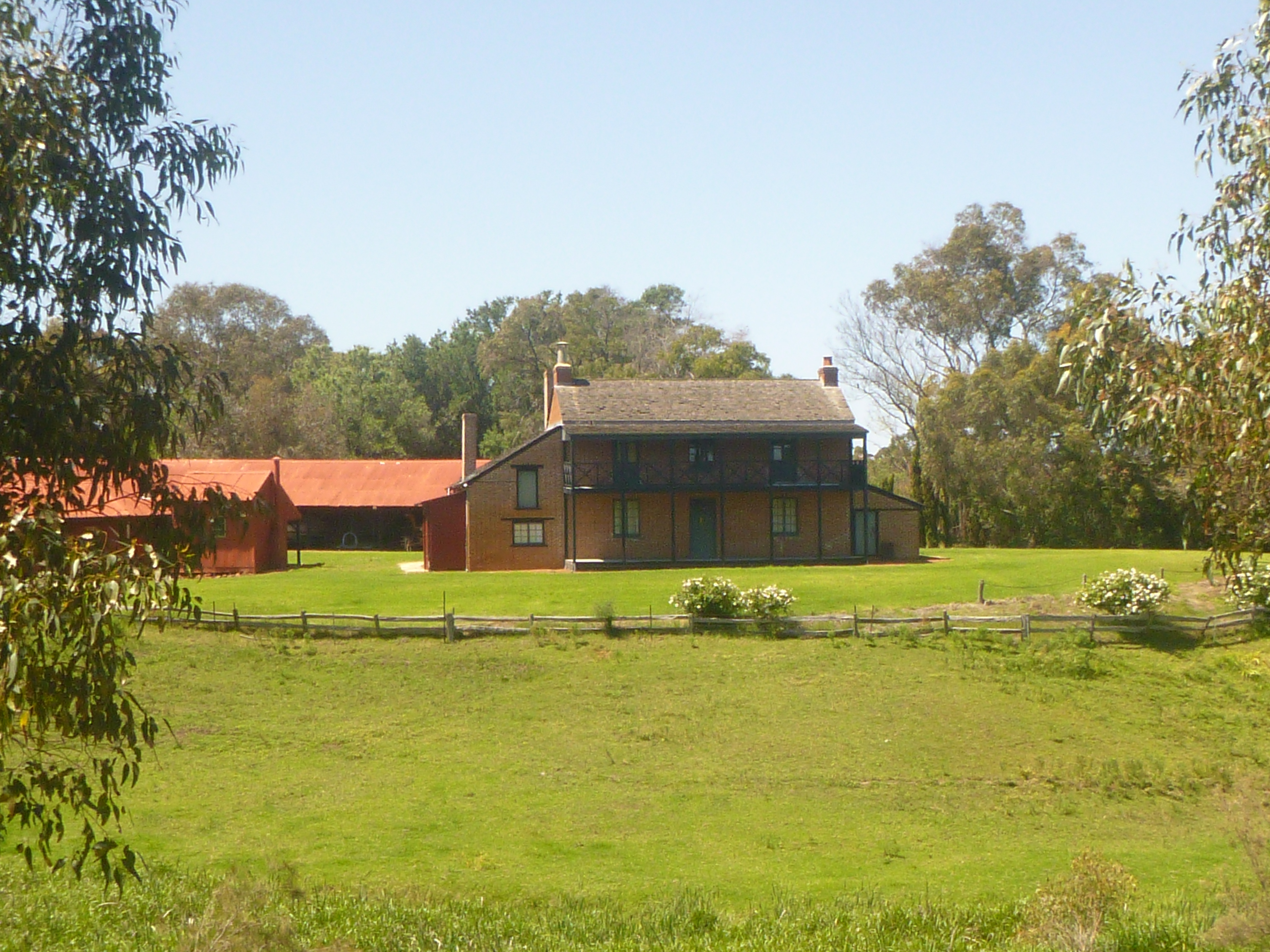
- Henry Bull's homestead in Belhus
- Coordinates: 31.781°S 116.010°E
- Population: 264 (SAL 2021)
- Postcode(s): 6069
- Area: 4 km^{2} (1.5 sq mi)
- LGA(s): City of Swan
- State electorate(s): West Swan
- Federal division(s): Hasluck
Suburbs around Belhus:
The Vines	The Vines	Upper Swan
Aveley	Belhus	Upper Swan
Henley Brook	Henley Brook	Baskerville

Belhus is a rural north-eastern suburb of Perth, Western Australia, in the City of Swan local government area. It is located in the Swan Valley region, at the confluence of the Swan River and the Ellen Brook.

The locality is characterised by a low-density rural-residential landscape of hobby farms, vineyards and light agricultural industry. It also contains several preserved historic sites from the early Swan River Colony era of Western Australia, including the homestead of pioneer settler Henry Bull and the final resting place of Noongar warrior Yagan.

== History ==
=== Name ===
Belhus is named after the Belhus Estate that formerly existed in the area, which was named after Belhus Mansion in England. The mansion was the ancestral seat of the Barrett-Lennard family, who came to own the Belhus Estate in the 1900s.

=== Prehistory ===
The waterways of the Swan River and the Ellen Brook were important thoroughfares and food sources for the Whadjuk Noongar people to access the Swan coastal plains. Early European explorers observed that the Belhus area i.e. the confluence of the brook and the river was pitted with yams. Several registered aboriginal heritage sites exist in the east of the locality, including Site ID 4079, an extensive artefact scatter dating to the Holocene period.

=== Colonial era ===
As a result of the French reports of Western Australia, British naval officer Captain James Stirling led a party from the HMS Success on an expedition up the Swan River, to survey the area for colonisation potential. The party stopped around the Belhus area at the Ellen Brook confluence, camping there before turning back.

Stirling returned to Australia in 1829 to establish the Swan River Colony and grant surveyed land along the river to settlers. Most of Belhus was included in Swan Location 1, a 15,000-acre area that was granted to English merchant George Leake. As Leake elected to reside in Fremantle, he hired Henry Bull to live on the property, establish pastoral agriculture and work the lands into a profitable state. Their venture was a success; Leake gained the legal title to Swan Location 1 and Bull's farm gained a reputation for high quality produce.

One of Bull's servants, William Cruse, built a flour mill, race and dam on the property, forming a popular and important milling service for farmers in the Upper Swan area. Bull also hired bricklayer Richard Edwards to build a homestead for him using bricks made on the estate. The mill, farm lands, stockyards, barns, kilns and resident homesteads all collectively became known as the Ellen's Brook Estate. The homestead, mill race and a reconstruction of the millhouse all remain extant today, forming a heritage precinct.

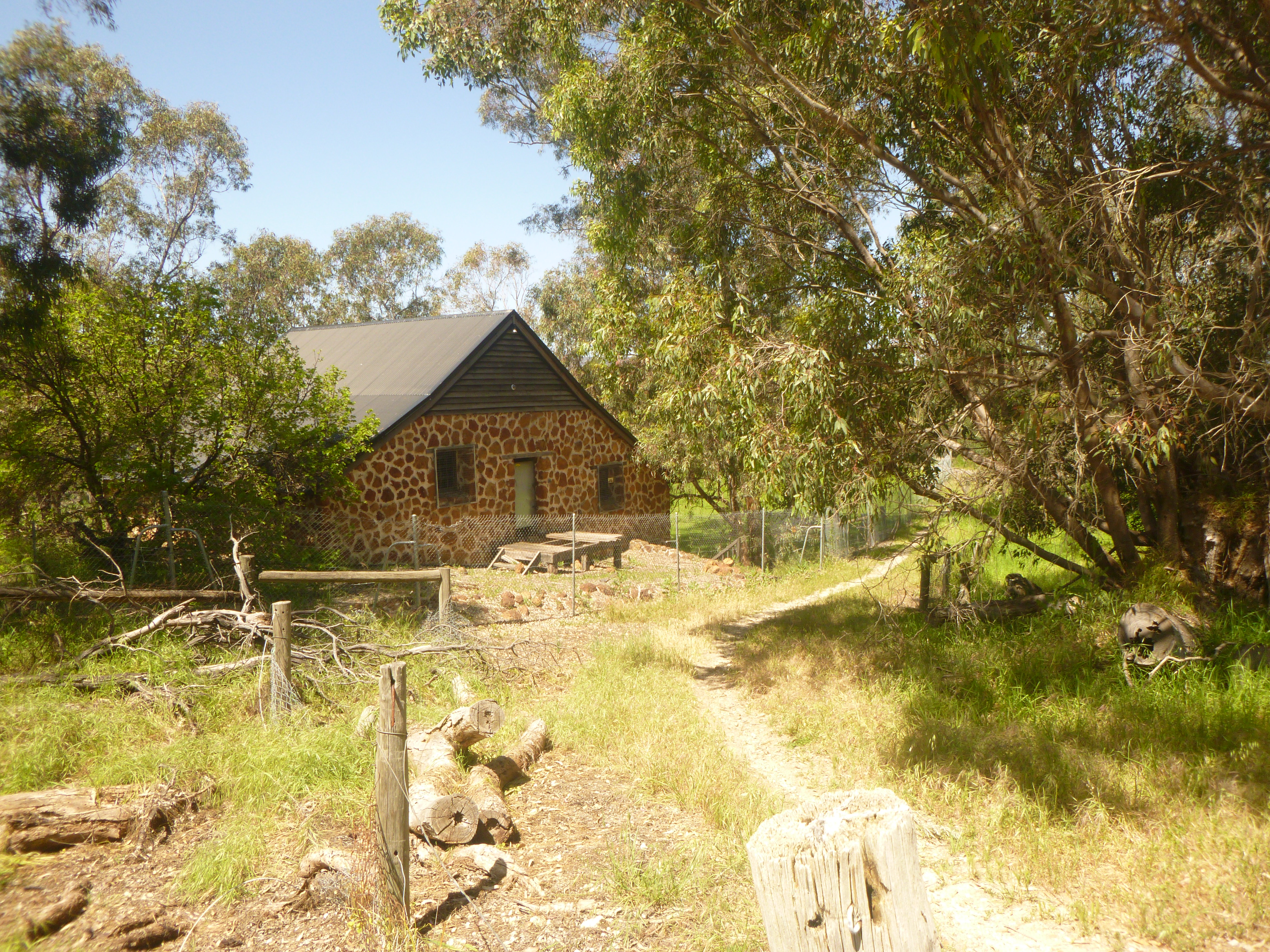
Cruse's mill house - reconstructed in 1988

In 1833, outlawed Noongar warriors Yagan and Heegan took overnight refuge at Bull's homestead in Swan Location 1, but were shot and killed the next morning by two of Bull's cattle herders during an altercation. Their bodies were buried on the north shore of the Swan River nearby, but Yagan's head was cut off and taken away from the area in order to claim a bounty that had been placed on him. The killing was condemned by the majority of colonists at the time.

The Ellen's Brook Estate went through a series of transfers and divisions after 1838. Leake gifted the northern half of Swan Location 1 to Bull for his efforts, then surrendered the unprofitable western two-thirds (the site of modern-day Ellenbrook) back to the Crown. Leake then went on to purchase the adjoining Swan Location A to the south from William Burges, expanding Leake's holdings immediately around the river. After Bull left the area, Leake leased the Ellen's Brook Estate to Cruse and farmers Saul Spice and John Connolly, who all continued to work the lands while raising their families there.

Indentured labour consisting of Aboriginal prisoners and British convicts were brought in by the colonial administration to build two public bridges, the Upper Swan Bridge and the Ellen's Brook Bridge, across the waterways in the area. The bridges at their completion in 1851 allowed harvests from the eastern districts to be easily carted across to Cruse's mill house. The Swan Road District assumed local governance of the bridges and the wider estate lands in 1871.

=== Modern era ===
The Ellen's Brook Estate was sold to George Hardey Barrett-Lennard in 1897, who renamed it to Belhus Estate. Unlike past colonial land uses, Barrett-Lennard aggressively pursued viticulture across the estate, initially using Cruse's mill for irrigation until replacing it with a new dam and earthworks. During this time, the main road from Upper Swan to Perth was re-aligned in 1906, from what is now Cruse Road to the present-day alignment of West Swan Road, including a new road bridge across the Ellen Brook. Shortly afterwards, the original convict-built Ellen's Brook Bridge was un-gazetted as a public road. Cruse's mill subsequently fell into disuse and was eventually destroyed by a fire.

Subsequent generations of the Barrett-Lennard family carried the Belhus viticulture business into the 20th century, expanding into grape exports to Europe and South East Asia. Belhus was considered to be one of the largest and most productive vineyards in the valley, regularly employing a staff of up to 70 seasonal workers and contributing to the growing reputation for wine and grape production seen elsewhere in the Swan Valley, in areas such as Henley Brook and Upper Swan.

Belhus was established as a postal locality in 1972 by the Shire of Swan. The western half of the estate was then sold in 1987 to John Roberts, who founded Egerton Estate and stud in the area. Roberts also built a reconstruction of Cruse's mill house and wheel, using authentic remains of the originals that had been excavated at the site. The remaining eastern half of Belhus was subdivided into 36 residential lots by the Barrett-Lennards the following year, necessitating the construction of Millhouse Road and its accompanying bridge across the Ellen Brook.

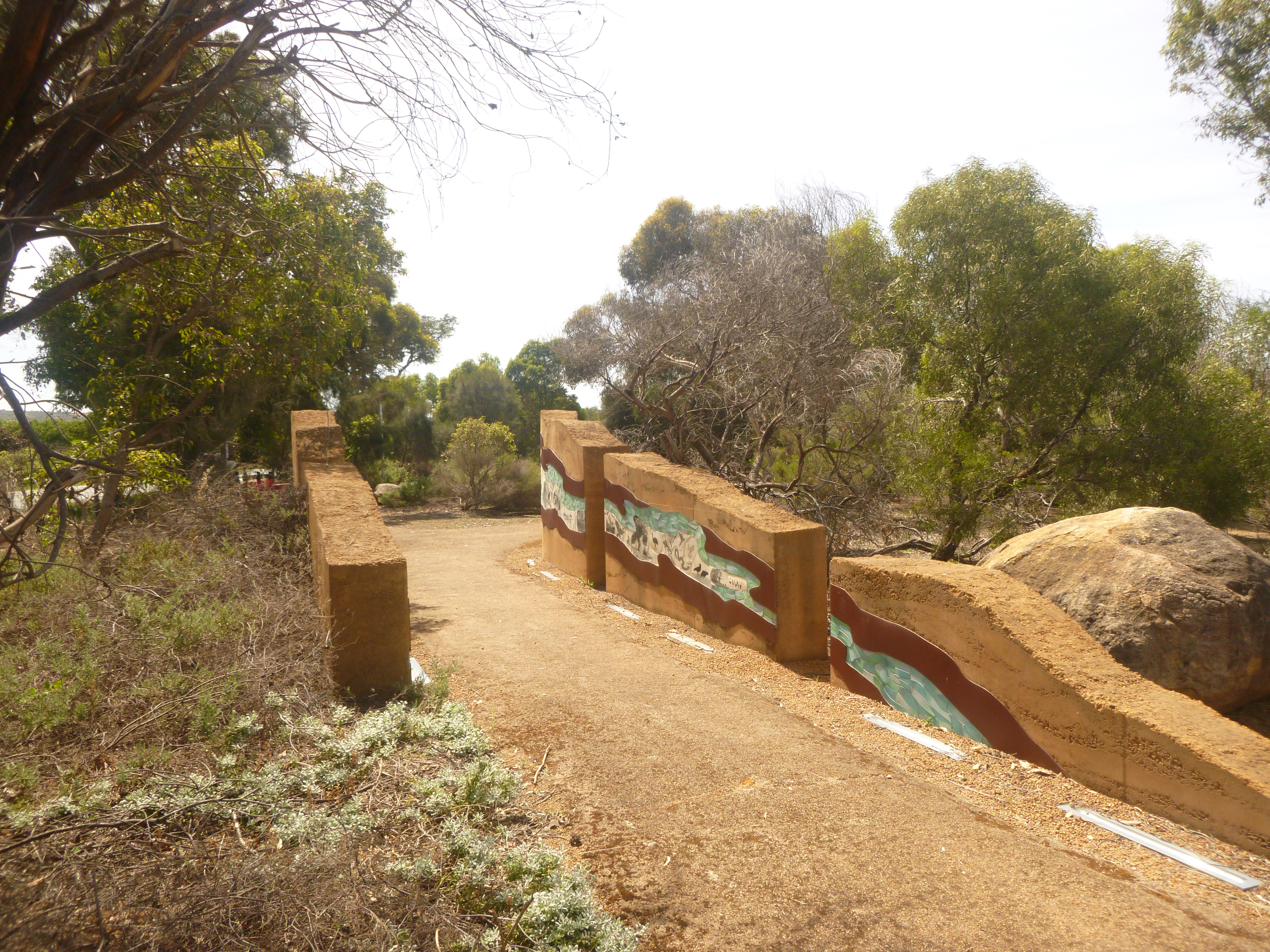
Yagan Memorial Park

Following the establishment of the Ellenbrook joint venture in 1992, most of the lands west of the Ellen Brook were excised from Belhus and transferred to the new Ellenbrook locality. Egerton Estate was subsequently transferred a second time in 2006, to its own dedicated suburb named Aveley. The remainder of Belhus came under the purview of the 1995 Swan Valley Planning Act, conserving and preserving its rural state as a part of the Swan Valley tourism and industry corridor.

Yagan Memorial Park was built in 2010 in the east of Belhus, near where Yagan's body was believed to have been buried after his murder. The exhumed head of Yagan, having been re-patriated from Britain, was re-buried in the park during a traditional ceremony that was attended by state and Indigenous dignitaries.

In 2014, an extensive wetland monitoring station was constructed near the millhouse by the state government's Department of Biodiversity, Conservation and Attractions, to manage nutrient levels within the Ellen Brook catchment.

== Geography ==
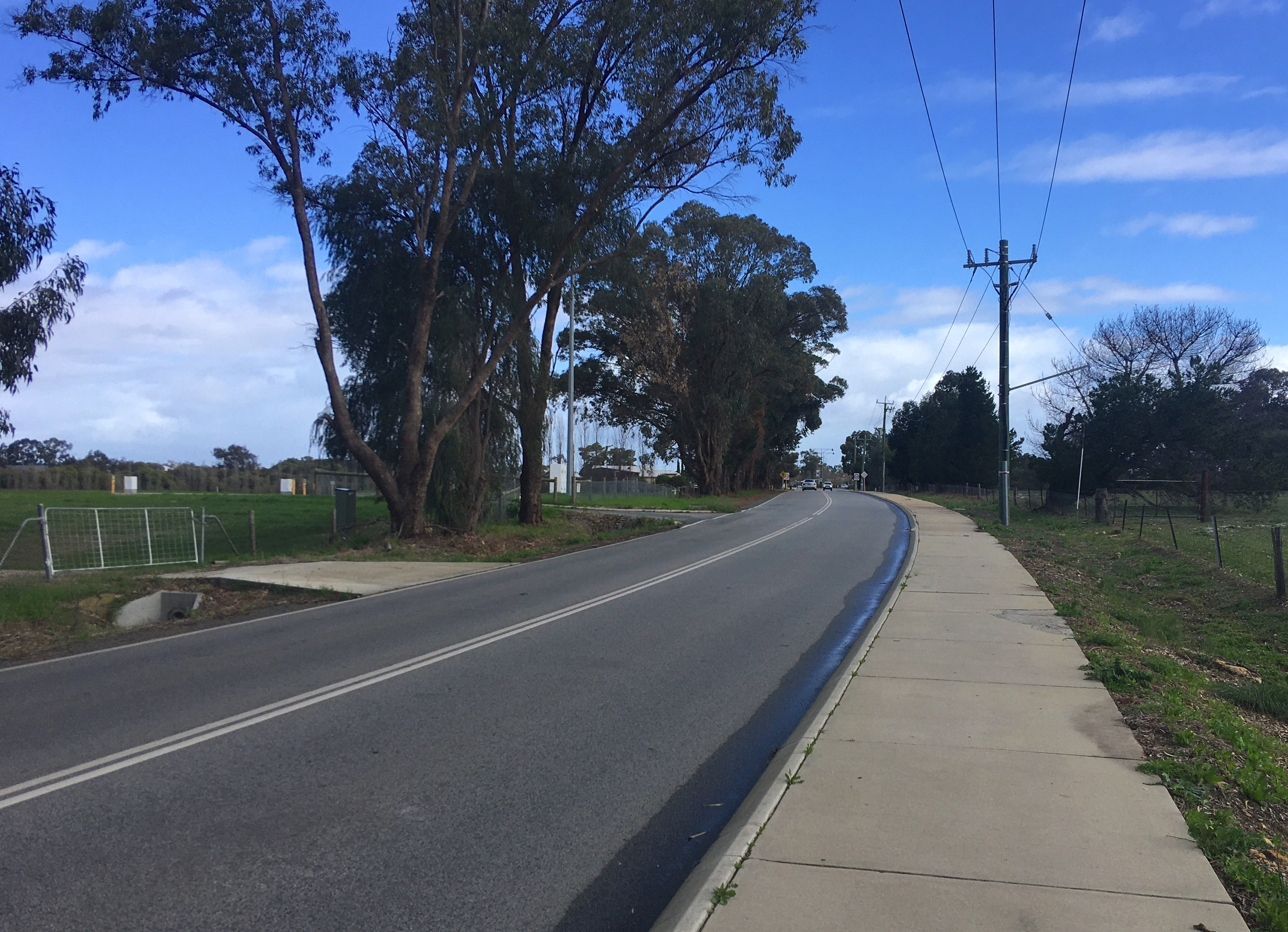
Millhouse Road in Belhus

Belhus is bounded by Upper Swan to the south and east, Aveley to the west and The Vines to the north. Large swathes of the Swan River and the Ellen Brook form natural boundary lines of the suburb. From 1972 to 1992, the boundaries also included Aveley and the southern half of Ellenbrook.

Like the rest of the Swan Valley region to the south, Belhus is characterised by hobby farms, orchards, vineyards and light agricultural industrial uses. The abundant waterways throughout the locality contribute to its highly fertile, loamy soils. Topographically, most of the area sits around 15 metres above sea level, rising to 25 metres along Millhouse Road. The depressions on the banks of the Swan River and the Ellen Brook drop to 7 metres, forming large valleys.

There are only two main roads that traverse the locality - West Swan Road (State Route 52) from Guildford crosses the Ellen Brook to Upper Swan, while Millhouse Road connects to Aveley and Ellenbrook. Both roads are classified as District Distributors in the Main Roads Western Australia road hierarchy.

== Demographics ==
At the 2021 Australian census, Belhus had a low and sparse population of 265, in line with its rural zoning and land uses. 48.3% of Belhus residents were male and 51.7% were female. Belhus's median age was 54, much higher than the state and national average of 38. The most common ancestries in Belhus as of 2021 were English (44.3%), Australian (38.3%), Irish (7.6%), Italian (7.6%) and Scottish (7.2%), with 2.3% of residents identifying as Aboriginal and/or Torres Strait Islander. 68.6% of residents were born in Australia.

== Facilities and services ==
The locality relies on the urban centres of Ellenbrook and Aveley for shops, retail and dining, as well as the larger commercial and tourism region of the Swan Valley. Police, fire and ambulance services are all provided from stations in Ellenbrook. Two bus services are also provided by Transperth from Ellenbrook railway station - the 310 and the 345 - with bus stops located on Millhouse Road and West Swan Road.

Two public parks exist in Belhus - Yagan Memorial Park in the east and Corona Way Park in the west. The latter provides public footpath access to Cruse's mill and the Ellen Brook.

A telephone exchange exists in the north of the suburb, near the boundary with The Vines. Supply of electricity is split; the eastern half of the suburb is supplied from the Muchea substation, while the western half is supplied from the Henley Brook substation.
