= Henry Bull (settler) =

Early settler in Western Australia

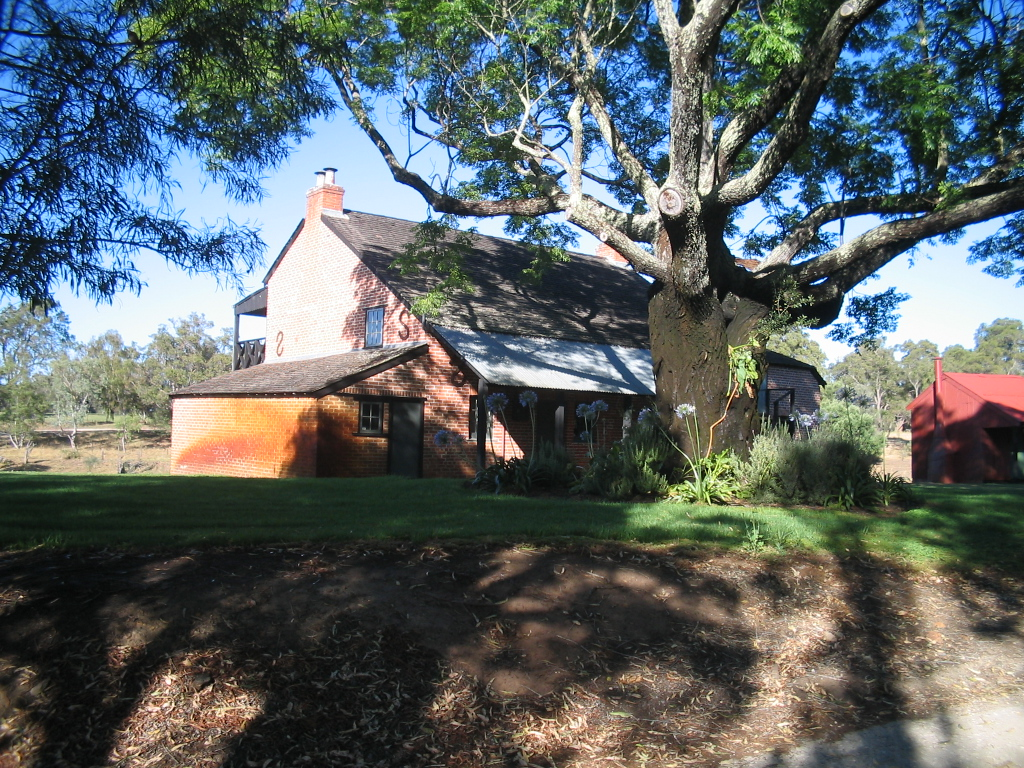
Millhouse Cottage, site of Henry Bull's mill

Lieutenant Henry Bull (1799 – c. 1848) was an early pioneer settler of the Swan River Colony in Western Australia.

He entered the Royal Navy in December 1813, and served in the West Indies and South America. He retired as a Lieutenant in 1829, and the following year he arrived at the Swan River. He took up land grants on the Canning River in the area, which is now known as Bull Creek, before moving to the Upper Swan district to take land there. His original land holding in the area, Swan Location 1 North, now comprises the suburbs of Upper Swan, The Vines and Ellenbrook.

Bull was the local magistrate of the Upper Swan district for many years. He and George Fletcher Moore are credited with the establishment and maintenance of friendly relations with the Indigenous people of the area.

In April 1835, Bull accompanied Moore on an expedition to the north of the Swan River. The following year he was appointed as temporary captain of the colonial schooner Champion, which had just been purchased. In 1838, he was Government Resident at Bunbury, and was a Member of the Executive Council in 1841. In 1848, he appointed agents to manage his affairs and apparently left the colony. He is thought to have died shortly afterwards.

== General references ==
- Shoobert, Joanne, ed. (2005). Western Australian Exploration, Volume One. Victoria Park, Western Australia: Hesperian Press. ISBN 978-0-85905-351-8.
- Morawa District Historical Society – mention of Bull's partnership with George Leake in Ellensbrook
- Morawa District Historical Society - further detail on Ellensbrook partnership and location of the property
- RAAF Pearce Airbase history
