= All Saints Anglican Church, Henley Brook =

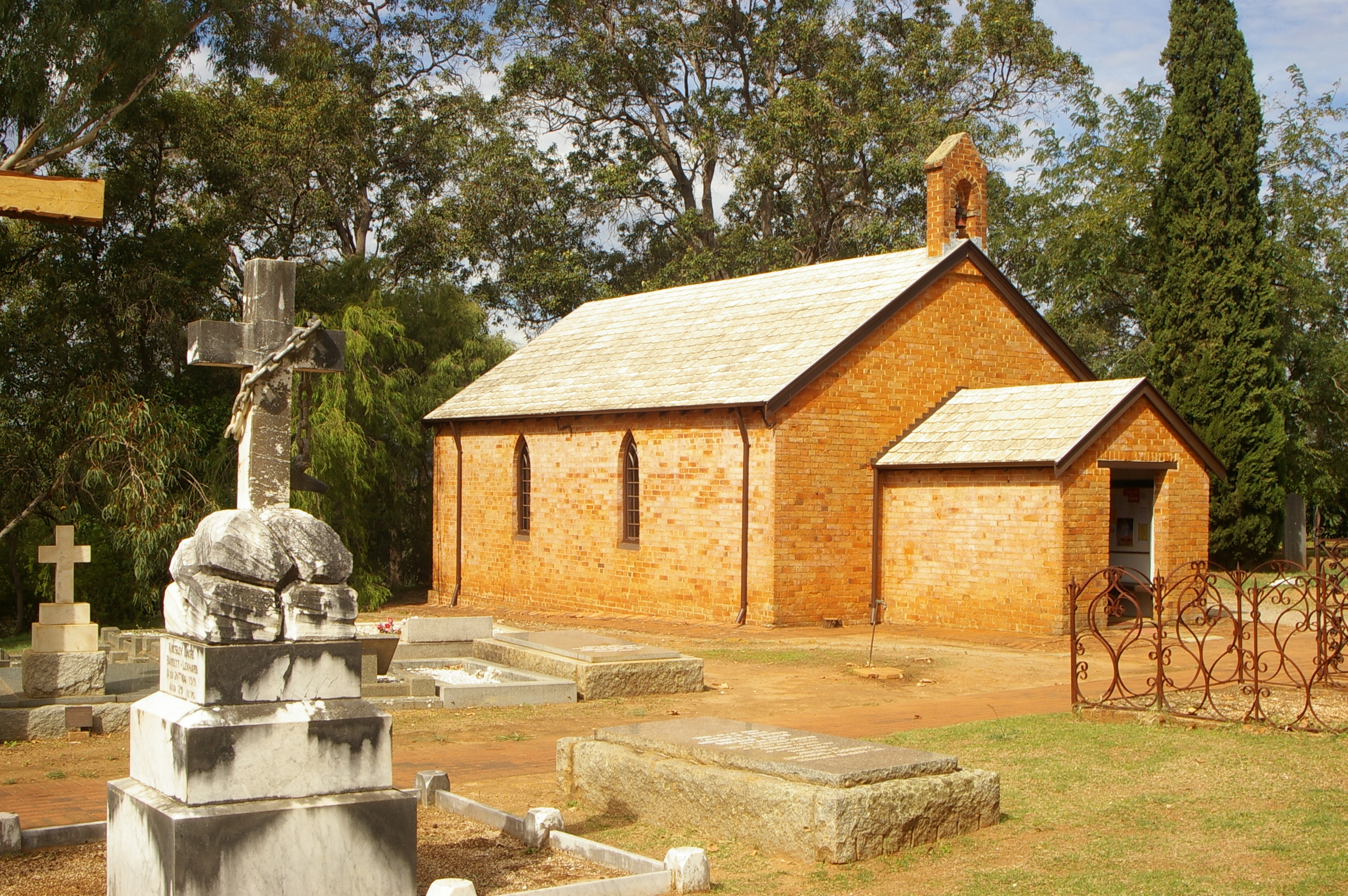
- The church in 2008
- All Saints Anglican Church, Henley Brook
- 31°47′45″S 116°0′14″E
- Location: Henry Street, Henley Brook, Western Australia
- Country: Australia
- Denomination: Anglican
- Website: All Saints Church

History
- Status: Church
- Founded: 1841
- Dedication: All Saints

Architecture
- Functional status: Active
- Years built: 1841–1938

Specifications
- Materials: Brick

Administration
- Province: Western Australia
- Diocese: Perth
- Parish: Swan

Western Australia Heritage Register
- Official name: All Saints Anglican Church
- Type: State Registered Place
- Designated: 31 May 1996
- Reference no.: 2492

The All Saints Church in Henley Brook is the oldest church in Western Australia. It was built by Richard Edwards between 1838 and 1840, with the first service taking place on 10 January 1841. The site is on a small hill overlooking the Swan River and near the conjunction of the Swan and Ellen Brook. This site was where Captain James Stirling camped during his 1827 exploration of the area.

== 1827 expedition ==
On 13 March 1827, Stirling's expedition of the Swan River finished in the area, unable to venture further upstream due to lack of navigable water. The party made camp on the high bank overlooking the river. He wrote in his diary:

"...the richness of the soil, the bright foliage of the shrubs, the majesty of the surrounding trees, the abrupt and red colour banks of the river occasionally seen, and the view of the blue mountains, from which we were not far distant, made the scenery of this spot as bieutiful [sic] as anything of the kind I have ever witnessed..."

== Religious services ==
The distance to Perth for church attendees was unreasonable, so St Mary’s — Middle Swan, was opened in 1840. However, in the absence of a bridge, the Swan River made it too difficult for those on the west side of the river. It was decided that an additional church would be built on the west side of the river at Upper Swan. Frederick Irwin, a devout Anglican, had been holding regular services on his property since 1830. The acre of land where Captain Stirling had camped was donated by Irwin and William Mackie, and in 1838, Reverend William Mitchell was appointed rector. Richard Edwards, Irwin's manager at Henley Park and a master bricklayer, undertook the building of the church.

With the assistance of local residents who donated both labour and materials, the church was completed in 1841. The flagstones of the church came from the ballast of ships that had sailed from England. The first service was held on 10 January 1841. Bishop Augustus Short of Adelaide consecrated All Saints Church in November 1848.

Services have been regularly held in the church since it was built. The Anglican Church holds services every Sunday, with additional services on significant occasions. All Saints Church is in the Anglican Parish of Swan. Prior to the establishment of the Perth diocese in 1857, churches in the Swan River Colony were part of the Adelaide diocese.

== Cemetery ==
The cemetery that surrounds the church includes the graves of a number of individuals who were significant to the development of the colony: William Mackie, John Connelly and Richard Edwards are all buried in the graveyard. There is a memorial to George Fletcher Moore inside the church.

In 1929, to mark the centenary of settlement, a lychgate was constructed to mark the furthest point inland that Captain James Stirling's 1827 expedition reached. During 1974, a memorial wall was built in the southwest corner of the cemetery. As part of the WAY 1979 celebrations, the Western Australian chapter of the Australian Institute of Builders restored the lychgate. Wrought iron gates completed the boundary fence in 1991; the gates are decorated with the words All Saints and Ellen's Brook.
