= Baskerville, Western Australia =

Baskerville
- Suburb
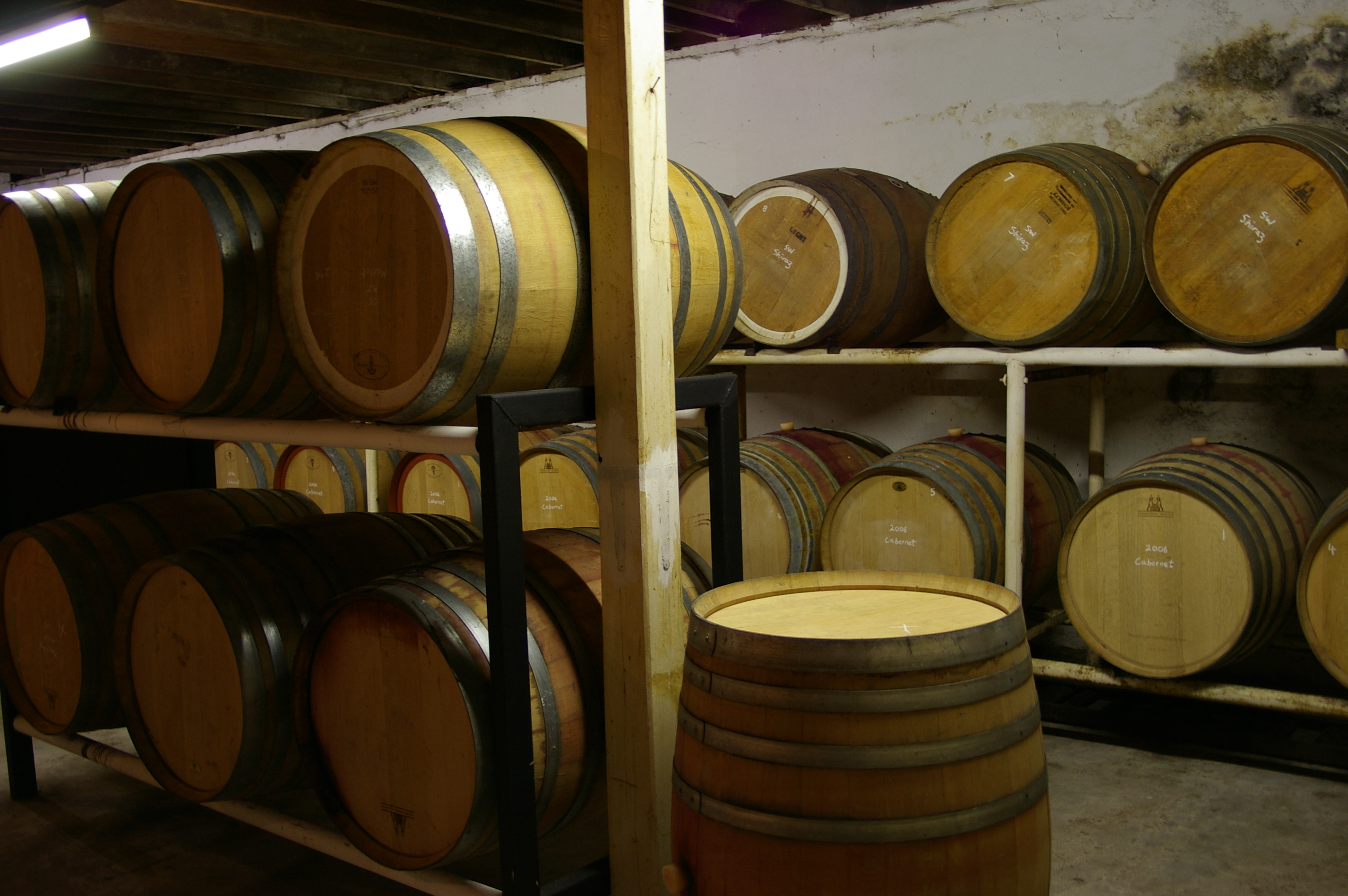
- Westfield Winery Cellar
- Interactive map of Baskerville
- Coordinates: 31.8°S 116.019°E
- Country: Australia
- State: Western Australia
- City: Perth
- LGA: City of Swan
- Location: 31 km (19 mi) from Perth; 13 km (8.1 mi) from Midland

Government
  - State electorate: Swan Hills
  - Federal division: Hasluck

Area
  - Total: 6.82 km^{2} (2.63 sq mi)

Population
  - Total: 302 (SAL 2021)
- Postcode: 6056
Suburbs around Baskerville
Belhus	Brigadoon
Henley Brook	Baskerville	Gidgegannup
	Millendon	Red Hill

Baskerville is an outer northeastern rural suburb of Perth, Western Australia, in the Swan Valley region, 31 km from Perth's central business district via Midland and Great Northern Highway. Nearly all of it is under cultivation with viticulture being the main economic activity, and several well-established Swan Valley wineries are based here. Its local government area is the City of Swan.

== History ==
The name Baskerville was given by William Tanner, a prominent Perth citizen and landowner, to Swan Location 5 when he took up a grant there in 1831. He never lived on the properties, however, and left the Swan River Colony in 1835. In the 1880s, the land was acquired by Walter Padbury, who employed his relative, Henry Hardwick, to manage it. In 1886 a homestead was built for him on what is now Memorial Avenue in the west of the suburb.

After World War I, the Government decided to commence a soldier resettlement scheme in the Swan Valley region, and subdivided it into lots of about 10-50 acres which would be operated as small farms. However, many of the soldiers had no agricultural experience, and sold the land to new migrants, particularly those from Yugoslavia and Italy who had experience in viticulture. A 1953 map by a CSIRO viticultural expert shows nearly all of Baskerville was used for grape growing, with some citrus orchards on the riverfront near what is now Amiens Crescent.

In 1989, the white-berried seedling of Cabernet Sauvignon, Cygne blanc, was discovered growing in a Baskerville garden planted next to a Cabernet Sauvignon vineyard.

Although the name of Baskerville was commonly in use for the area, it was not approved for the suburb until 1992.

== Geography ==
Baskerville is a narrow strip of land, starting on a curve in the Swan River and measuring approximately 800 m north–south by 7.5 km east–west, with Haddrill Road providing the centre line. A small area of native forest exists to the east of the suburb, accessible from Joshua Mews. No explicitly residential areas exist in the suburb.

== Facilities ==
A hall, pavilion and oval are located on Memorial Avenue, a fuel station is located on Great Northern Highway and many of the small family-run wineries, including an organic winery, on Memorial Avenue and Haddrill Road offer cellar door tastings. Belvoir Amphitheatre, an open-air concert venue, is just north of the suburb's boundary.

== Transport ==
Great Northern Highway, a two-lane single carriageway at this point, travels through the west of the suburb, and Haddrill Road, a minor distributor, provides access from the highway to the suburb's interior. Transperth bus routes 310 and 311 serve Great Northern Highway while route 312 serves Railway Parade and Haddrill Road further inland. All services are operated by Swan Transit.

=== Bus ===
- 310 Midland Station to Ellenbrook Station – serves Great Northern Highway
- 312 Midland Station to Midland Station – Circular Route, serves Railway Crescent and Haddrill Road

== See also ==
- Swan Valley, Western Australia
