= Ellen Brook =

River in Western Australia

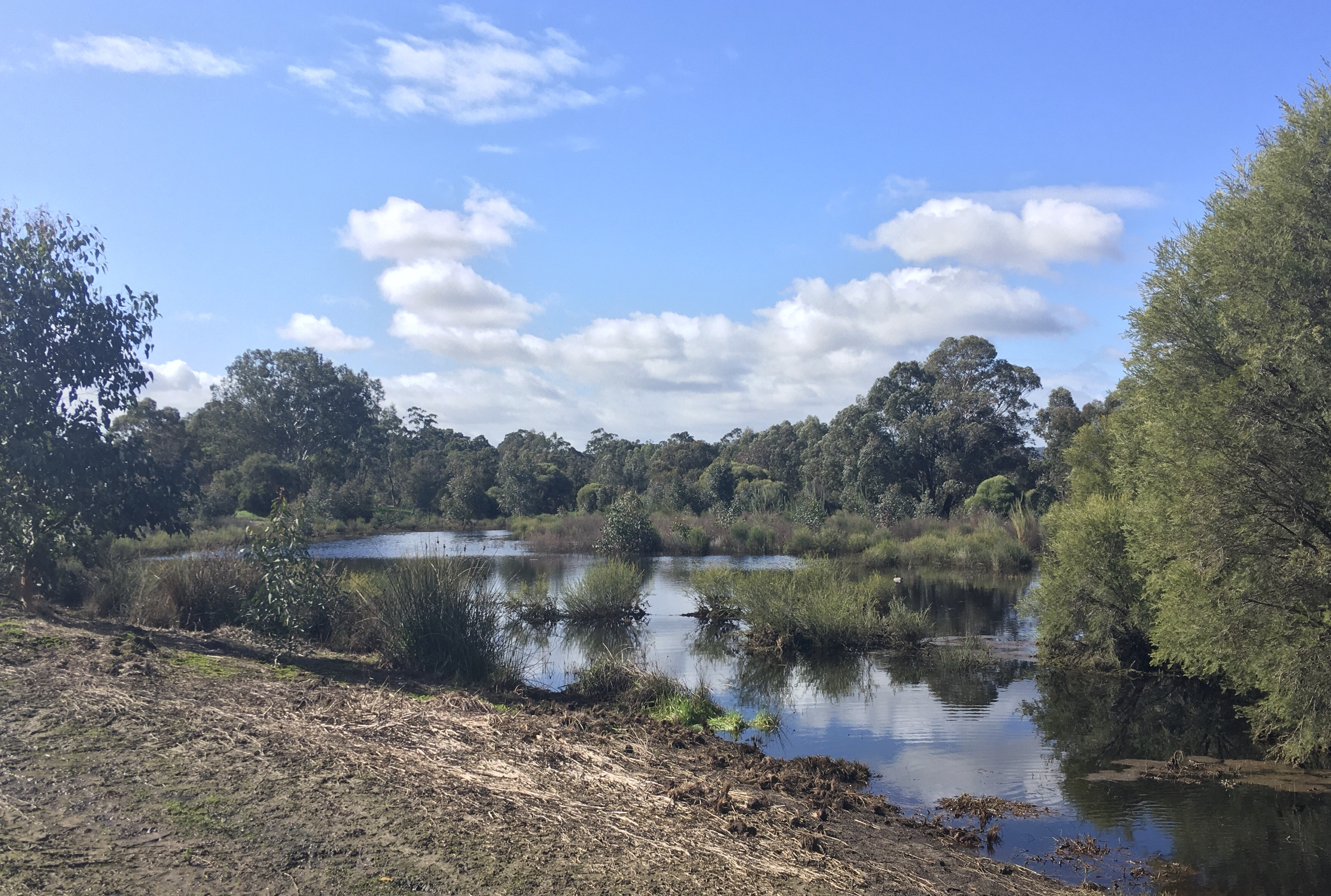
- Ellen Brook near Millhouse Road bridge in Belhus, July 2021

Location
- Country: Australia
- State: Western Australia

Physical characteristics
- Source: Groundwater, various streams
  - location: South of Gingin
  - coordinates: 31.464°S 115.928°E
- Mouth: Swan River
  - location: Belhus
  - coordinates: 31.795°S 116.005°E
- Length: 65 km (40 mi)
- Basin size: 715 km^{2} (276 sq mi)
- Discharge
  - average: 8.9 GL (310×10^{6} cu ft)

Ellen Brook is an ephemeral stream which runs from south of Gingin to the Swan River in Western Australia.

== Overview ==
The headwaters of Ellen Brook start south of Gingin, in the Wheatbelt region. From there, Ellen Brook travels south, generally parallel and to the east of Brand Highway, through agricultural land. Near Muchea, Ellen Brook passes under Brand Highway, Granary Drive and Tonkin Highway. From there, it heads south, between Great Northern Highway and Muchea South Road, passing to the west of RAAF Base Pearce in Bullsbrook, before reaching Upper Swan, where it passes under Muchea South Road, past residential areas in The Vines and Belhus, before joining the Swan River in the Swan Valley.

Tributaries to the west of Ellen Brook are sourced by groundwater flowing from the Gnangara Mound. Tributaries to the east have aquifers on the Dandaragan plateau as their source.

The brook only flows from May to December. At a size of 715 square kilometres (276 sq mi), Ellen Brook is the largest sub catchment for the Swan–Canning catchment, and one of the main sources of nitrogen and phosphorus for the Swan–Canning river system. The Western Australia Department of Water and Environmental Regulation monitors water quality in Ellen Brook.

== Name ==
Ellen Brook is named after Ellen Stirling, the wife of James Stirling, who was the first Governor of Western Australia. In turn, the suburb of Ellenbrook, located near the mouth of the brook, was named after the brook.

== See also ==
- Ellenbrook, Western Australia
- List of watercourses in Western Australia
