= Swan Valley (Western Australia) =

Region in Perth, Western Australia

Coordinates: 31°50′S 116°00′E

- Wine region
- Other names: Swan District
- Type: Australian Geographical Indication sub-region
- Year established: 2003
- Country: Australia
- Part of: Swan District

Swan Valley is a region in the upper reaches of the Swan River between Guildford and Bells Rapids, Western Australia. It is bordered to the east by the Darling Scarp. Both Ellenbrook and Jane Brook lie within the region and discharge into the Swan River. There are seven suburbs within the region: Baskerville, Belhus, Caversham, Henley Brook, Herne Hill, Millendon and West Swan. It is part of the City of Swan local government area.

Swan Valley Australian Geographical Indication is a sub-region of the larger Swan District wine region. Swan Valley was registered on 6 January 2003 following Swan District being registered on 10 December 1998.

== History ==
The indigenous heritage of the region is over 40,000 years old. The Noongar Aboriginal people of the Wadjuk tribe were the previous inhabitants of the region. The Swan Valley was created by a serpent named Wagyl who is still believed to be living under the Swan River.

The area was explored in 1827 by Captain James Stirling later to become governor of the Swan River Colony. Stirling was so impressed with the area that he wrote in his diary:

...the richness of the soil, the bright foliage of the shrubs, the majesty of the surrounding trees, the abrupt and red colour banks of the river occasionally seen, and the view of the blue mountains, from which we were not far distant, made the scenery of this spot as beautiful as anything of the kind I have ever witnessed...

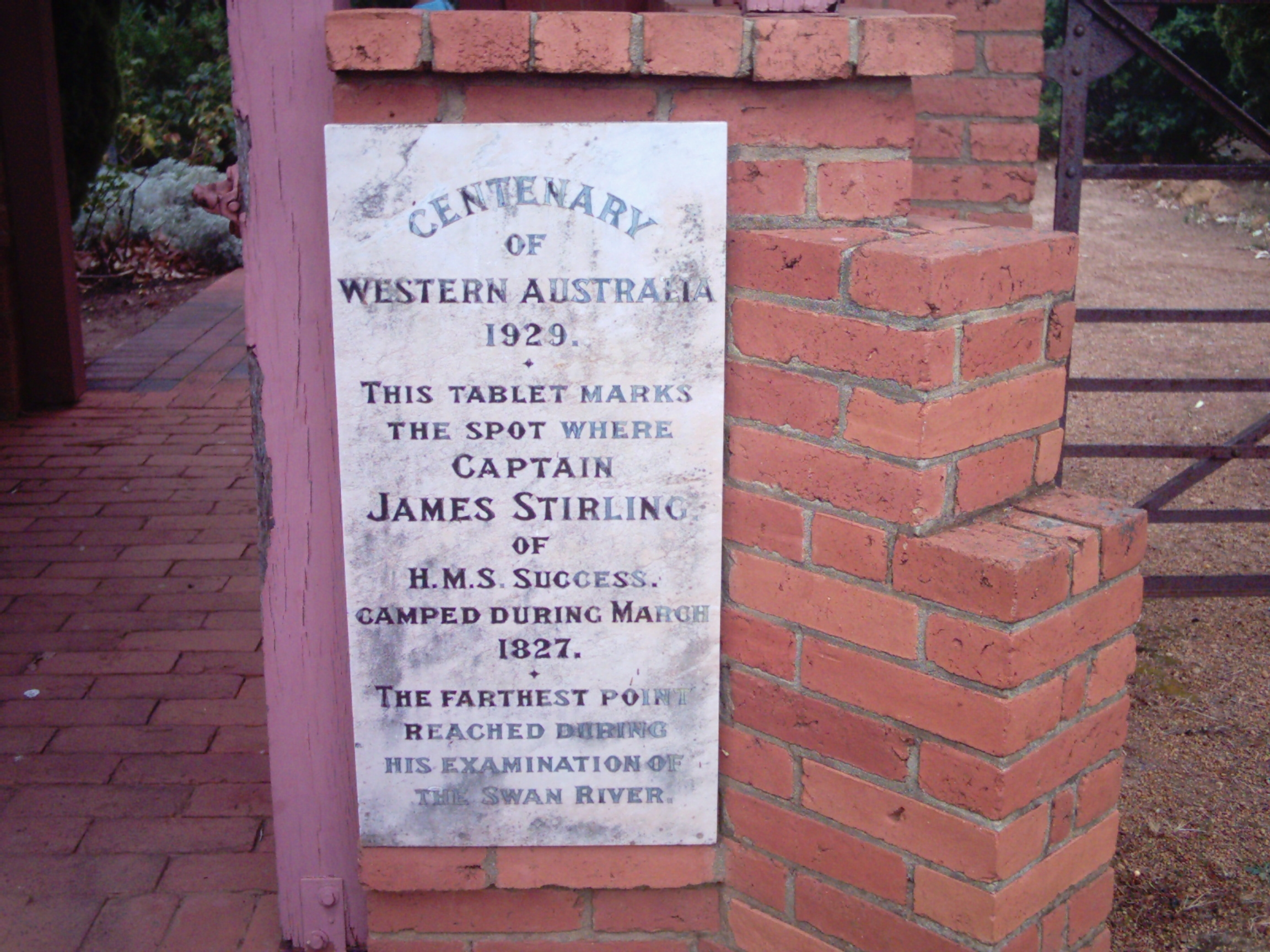
Centenary Stone at the All Saints Church in the Swan Valley

When Stirling returned to establish the colony in 1829 he created three settlements: Fremantle as the port; Perth as the major commercial and political centre; and Guildford on the southern end of the Swan Valley region. Descendants of many of the early families still reside within the shire. Within the first ten years, two of Perth's oldest churches had been built there: the first was St. Mary's Church in Middle Swan, followed by All Saints Church, Henley Brook built at the site of Stirling's 1827 camp. St. Mary's was rebuilt in 1869 but All Saints still retains its original structure and is thus Perth's oldest standing church.

== Attractions ==
Swan Valley is noted for its fertile soil, uncommon in the Perth region, and tourism-based destinations. These include numerous wineries such as the huge complex at what was once known as Houghton, the state's biggest producer, and Sandalford and also many small family-owned concerns. There are also several microbreweries and rum and gin distilleries. Swan Valley is served by roadside local-produce stalls which sell seasonal produce throughout the year. Grapes, melons, asparagus, stone fruits, citrus and strawberries are grown and sold in the Swan Valley.

Swan Valley has a food element in the form of a nougat factory, chocolate factory, coffee roasters, several beekeepers, a lavender farm, olive groves, a goat farm, cheese farms, dried-fruit producers, restaurants and cafes and many more local producers

During October for many years the annual "Spring in the Valley" weekend took place; it was one of Australia's largest wine and food festivals. This community event ceased around 2009 due to excessive anti-social behaviour of some participants. However some of the smaller wineries in the area have banded together and still present some small scale events in the valley during spring.

The West Australian Reptile Park is located in the valley at Henley Brook.
