= West Swan Road =

Road in Perth, Western Australia

West Swan Road Western Australia
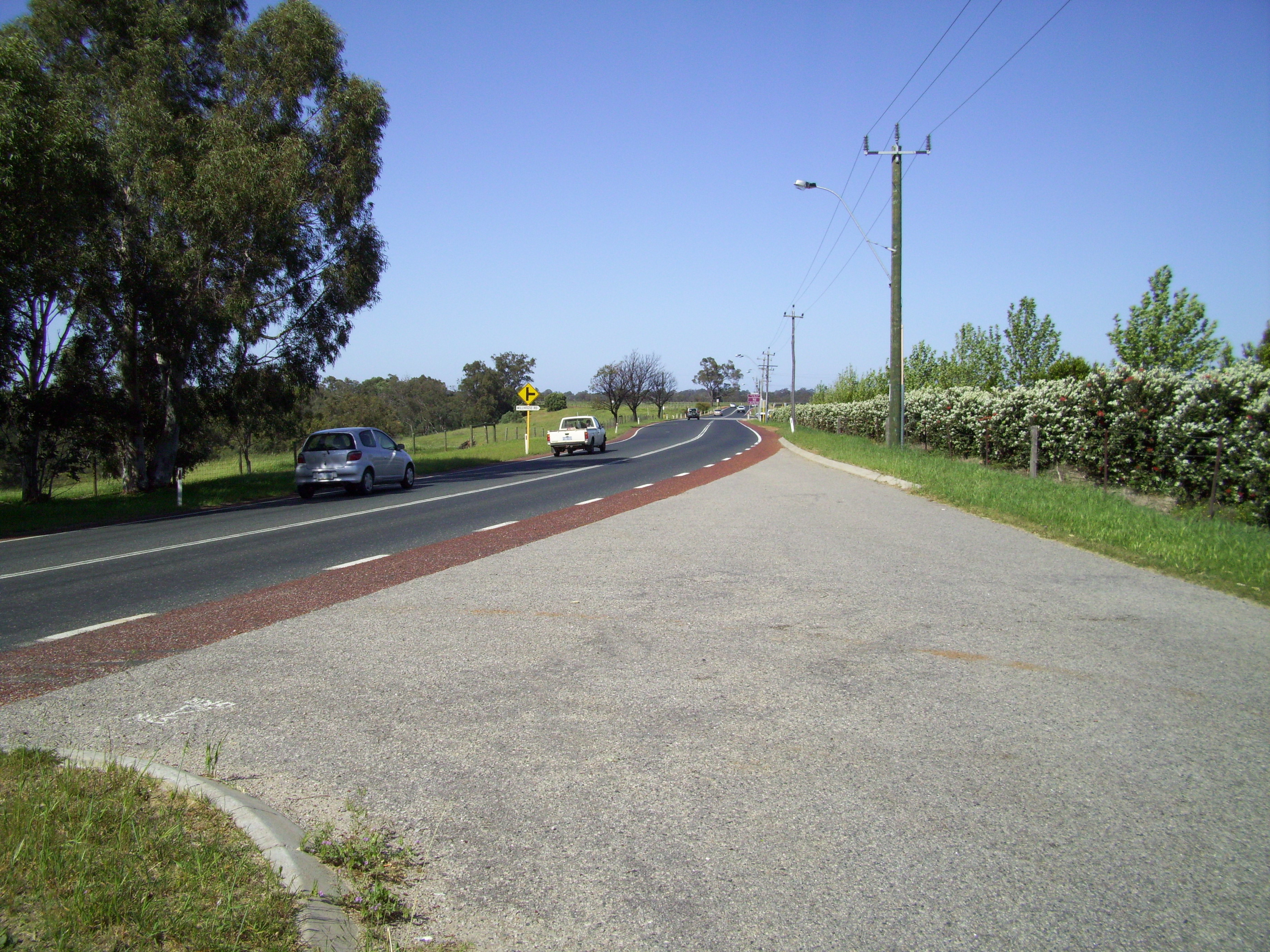
- Looking south, in Belhus

General information
- Type: Road
- Length: 16 km (9.9 mi)
- Gazetted: 30 March 1979
- Route number(s): State Route 52; Tourist Drive 203

Major junctions
- South end: Meadow Street (State Route 52), Guildford
- Benara Road (State Route 76); Reid Highway (State Route 3); Gnangara Road (State Route 84)
- North end: Great Northern Highway (National Highway 95 / National Route 1), Upper Swan

Location(s)
- Major suburbs: Caversham, West Swan, Henley Brook, Belhus

West Swan Road is a road in the Swan Valley wine region in the northeastern suburbs of Perth, Western Australia. Starting in the centre of Guildford, it provides access to the wineries of the region and to The Vines golf resort.

It was gazetted in 1979 and was known as road numbers 4288 and 1116 in plans and maps.

Views along West Swan Road

Heading south from Benara Road

Crossing the Swan River into Guildford

== Intersections ==
The entire road is within the City of Swan. Note the intersection list also includes Meadow Street for continuity down to Great Eastern Highway.

LGA	Location	km	mi	Destinations	Notes
Swan	Belhus–Upper Swan boundary	0.0	0.0	Great Northern Highway (National Highway 95 / National Route 1 / Tourist Drive 203) – Bullsbrook, Muchea, Moora, Midland	Northern terminus at traffic light controlled intersection; Tourist Drive 203 northern concurrency terminus
Swan	Belhus	0.9	0.56	Millhouse Road	Roundabout
Ellen Brook		2.1– 2.2	1.3– 1.4	Ellen Brook bridge	
Swan	Belhus–Henley Brook boundary	2.9	1.8	Gnangara Road (State Route 84) westbound / Henry Street eastbound – Ellenbrook, Wangara, Ocean Reef	Roundabout
Swan	Henley Brook	5.0	3.1	Park Street – Brabham	
Swan	Henley Brook-West Swan boundary	7.2	4.5	Woollcott Avenue – Brabham, Whiteman Park	Access to Whiteman Park railway station
Swan	West Swan	8.9	5.5	Harrow Street – Dayton, Brabham, Whiteman Park	
Swan	West Swan-Caversham boundary	10.9	6.8	Reid Highway (State Route 3) – Midland, Morley, Joondalup	Traffic light-controlled intersection. Future interchange to begin construction during 2025
Swan	Caversham	12.4	7.7	Arthur Street – Dayton	Roundabout
Swan	Caversham	12.7	7.9	Benara Road (State Route 76) – Lockridge, Noranda, Morley	Roundabout
Swan River		14.7– 14.9	9.1– 9.3	Barkers Bridge. Southern terminus of West Swan Road, continues south as Meadow Street southbound	
Swan	Guildford	15.2	9.4	Swan Street (Tourist Drive 203) – Woodbridge	Roundabout. Tourist Drive 203 southern concurrency terminus
Swan	Guildford	15.4	9.6	James Street (National Route 1; State Route 51) – Perth, Bassendean, Midland, Kalgoorlie	Meadow Street continues southbound as a local road, southbound access only.
1.000 mi = 1.609 km; 1.000 km = 0.621 mi: Concurrency terminus; Incomplete access; Note: Intersections with minor local roads are not shown
