= Stanage =

Stanage or Stannage may refer to:

- Stanage (surname), people with the surname Stanage and Stannage
- Stanage Edge or simply Stanage (from "stone edge"), a gritstone escarpment in the Peak District, England, famous as a location for climbing
- Stanage Park, listed English country house set in a large park east of Knighton, Powys near the settlement of Heartsease
- Stanage, Queensland, a town and locality in the Shire of Livingstone, Australia
