= Aveley Secondary College =

School in Perth, Western Australia

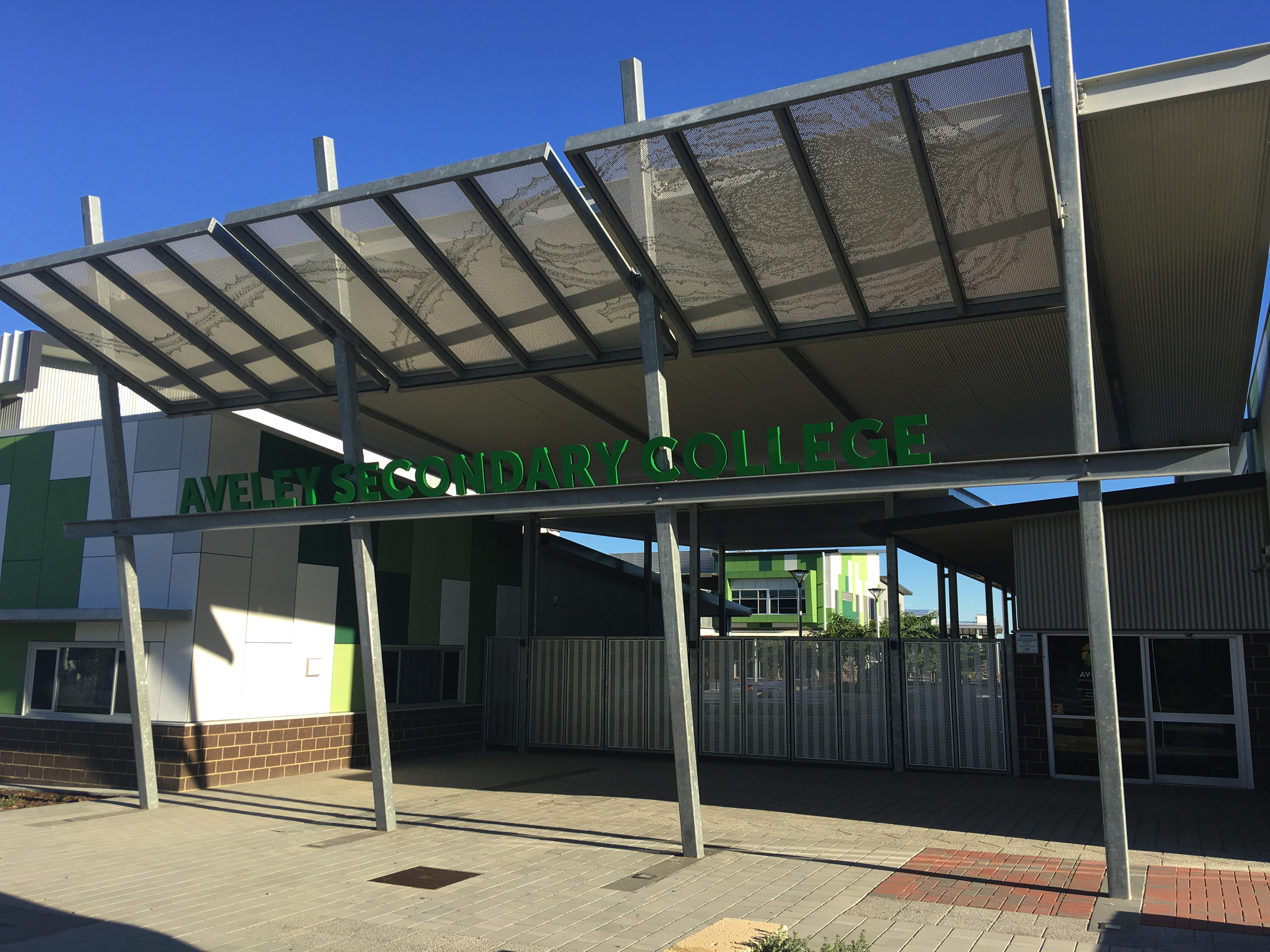

Location
- 55 Maffina Parade; Ellenbrook, Western Australia; Australia
- Coordinates: 31°46′01″S 115°59′13″E

Information
- Former name: North Ellenbrook Secondary College (planning name)
- Type: Independent public co-educational day school
- Opened: 2018; 7 years ago
- Educational authority: WA Department of Education
- Principal: Stephen Pestana
- Years: 7–12
- Enrolment: 1,543 (2024)
- Campus type: Suburban
- Website: www.aveleysc.wa.edu.au

Aveley Secondary College is an Independent public co-educational high day school, located in the Perth suburbs of Ellenbrook and Aveley, Western Australia. The boundary between Ellenbrook and Aveley transects the school's campus, with the northern part situated in Ellenbrook and the southern part in Aveley. However, most of the school’s buildings are located in Ellenbrook.

== Overview ==
Large population growth in Ellenbrook and surrounding suburbs caused there to be a need for another secondary school in the Ellenbrook area in the early 2010s. The only other secondary school in the area was Ellenbrook Secondary College, which opened in 2007, and was predicted to have enrolment in excess of 2000 students if another school did not open in the area. In 2013, the state Liberal government promised to build a school in northern Ellenbrook by 2017. In December 2013, the opening date for the new school was revised to the start of 2018.

In February 2018, Aveley Secondary College opened for Year 7 students, with each year increasing in the number of year groups until 2023, when the school will have its first Year 12's. Further construction started in December 2019 to build more classrooms, which are now available to the students as of 2021.

== Controversies ==
In recent years, Aveley Secondary College has faced scrutiny over incidents involving bullying and student violence. In April 2025, a 14-year-old student was hospitalised with serious injuries, including a broken jaw and bleeding on the brain, after an alleged assault by another student at a nearby shopping centre. This incident followed reports of ongoing behavioural issues at the school and prompted community concern.

== Local intake area ==
Aveley Secondary College's local intake area covers part of Aveley, Baskerville, most of Belhus, Brigadoon, part of Ellenbrook, Millendon, The Vines and Upper Swan. Students living in the local intake area have a guaranteed place at the school if they apply. Students living outside the local intake area can apply as well, but they will be accepted on a case-by-case basis.

== Student numbers ==
Year	Number
2018	258
2019	560
2020	820
2021	1,097
2022	1,318
2023	1,479
2024	1,543

== See also ==
- List of schools in the Perth metropolitan area
