= Stanage (surname) =

Stanage or Stannage is a surname. Notable people with the surname include:

== Stanage ==
- Niall Stanage (born 1974), Irish journalist
- Oscar Stanage (1883–1964), American baseball player
- Tom Stanage (1932–2020), Irish Anglican bishop and theologian

== Stannage ==
- James Stannage (1950–2026), English late night talk show radio host
- Miriam Stannage (1939–2016), Australian conceptual artist
- Tom Stannage (1944–2012), Australian historian, academic, Australian rules football player and administrator
