= Aveley, Western Australia =

Aveley
- Suburb
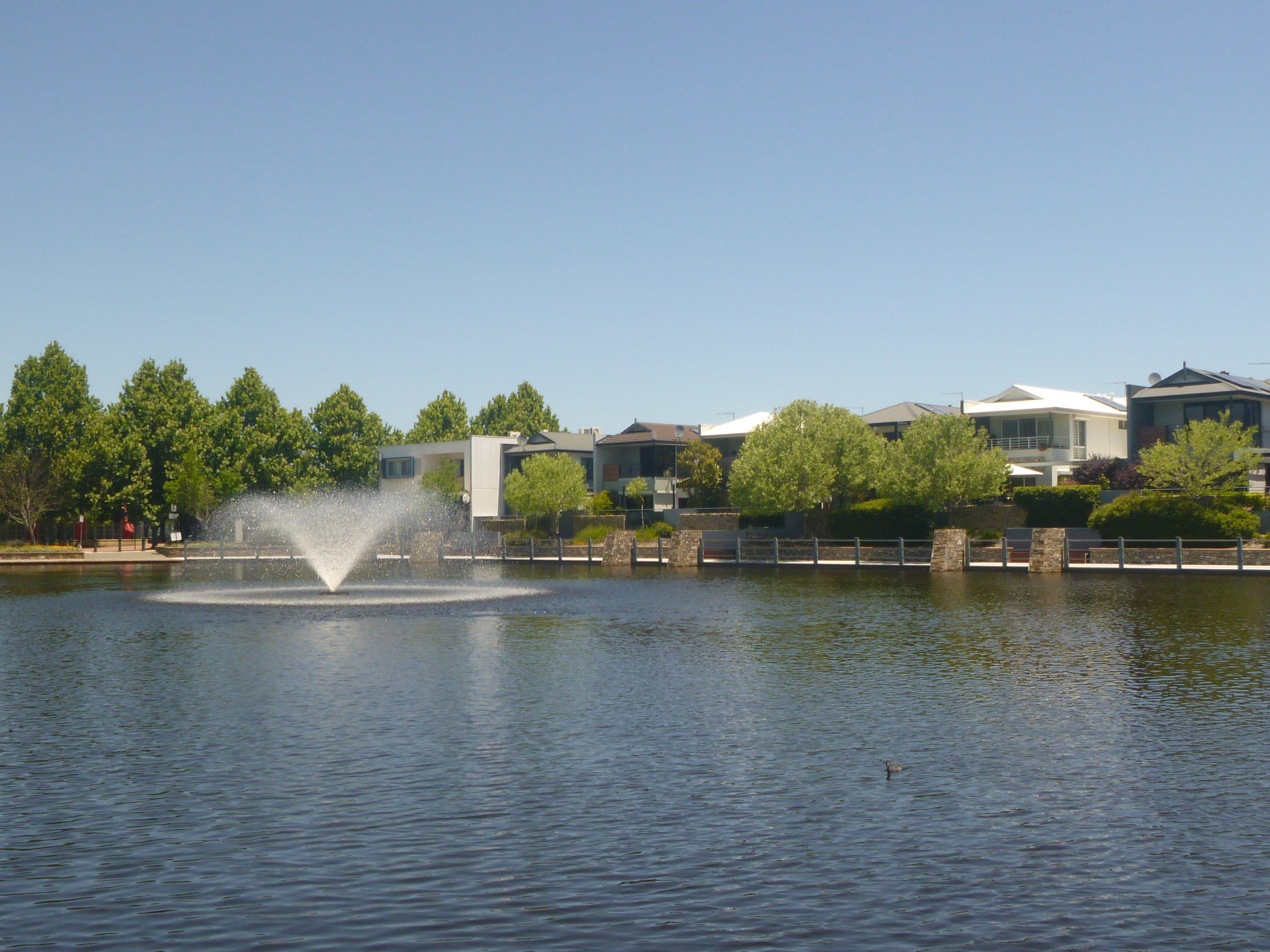
- Aveley Central Park
- Interactive map of Aveley
- Coordinates: 31.781°S 115.988°E
- Country: Australia
- State: Western Australia
- City: Perth
- LGA: City of Swan
- Established: 2006

Government
  - State electorate: Swan Hills
  - Federal division: Hasluck

Area
  - Total: 6.1 km^{2} (2.4 sq mi)

Population
  - Total: 13,998 (SAL 2021)
- Postcode: 6069
Suburbs around Aveley
Ellenbrook	Ellenbrook	The Vines
Ellenbrook	Aveley	Belhus
Henley Brook	Henley Brook	Henley Brook

Aveley is an outer suburb of Perth, Western Australia, located 30 kilometres (19 mi) north-east of Perth's central business district in the City of Swan. It is adjacent to and forms a common urban area with the secondary metropolitan centre of Ellenbrook. The suburb was developed during the 2000s and the 2010s as a masterplanned community.

== History ==
=== Name ===
The suburb of Aveley is named after the town of Aveley in Essex, England. It is also a reference to the Barrett-Lennard family who previously owned the lands in the suburb - their ancestral estate, Belhus Manor, was located in the town. The neighbouring locality of Belhus is named in a similar fashion.

=== Aboriginal history ===
The waterway of the Ellen Brook was an important thoroughfare and food source for the Whadjuk Noongar people. Remnant aboriginal activity in the Aveley area has been identified at various points by surveyors. Three scarred trees, DAA IDs 17316, 17317 and 17318 are present in the Wistful Wetlands swamp reserve to the west, and two camp sites were identified during the area's re-zoning process in 1994.

=== Colonial era and Belhus estate ===
During the Swan River Colony era, Aveley and the wider areas around the Ellen Brook were part of the land grants of Swan Location 1 and Swan Location A. Towards the end of the 1800s, both grants had come under the ownership of Fremantle merchant George Leake, creating the area known as the Ellen's Brook Estate. It was leased out by the Leake family for farming and livestock.

After changing hands to the Barrett-Lennard family in 1897, the estate was renamed to Belhus Estate. From 1908, the family changed the primary land uses to viticulture and winemaking, building it up into a successful vineyard throughout the early 20th century.

The Swan Road District assumed local governance of the estate and the wider area in 1871. In 1972, the estate was gazetted by the Shire of Swan as the new postal locality of Belhus.

=== Egerton estate ===
The Barrett-Lennards began to subdivide Belhus Estate, first in the 1950s, then again in the 1980s. In 1987, John Roberts of Multiplex bought the half of Belhus west of the Ellen Brook and founded Egerton estate - a commercial thoroughbred horse stud, an aviary and private zoo and also a rural retreat for himself and his family. The stud later expanded into merino breeding in 1989. The zoo included two galápagos tortoises which were later donated by Roberts to Perth Zoo in 2005.

Queen Elizabeth II and Prince Philip spent two nights at Egerton as guests of Roberts, during their 1988 tour of Australia for the Australian Bicentenary.

Egerton was moved from Belhus into the new locality of Ellenbrook in 1992 and was briefly a part of the Ellenbrook new town project in its early stages. Multiplex declined an invitation to join the Ellenbrook joint venture company, but nonetheless, commenced detailed structure and town planning to re-zone Egerton from rural to urban, with an intention to develop the lands at a later date on their own terms. The urban re-zoning proposal succeeded in 1994, but development did not start straightaway.

=== Vale townsite ===
The suburban re-development of Egerton, by now known as the "Vale" project, was officially commenced by Multiplex in November 2004. Stage 1 of the new suburb was released in the far south of the estate, facing onto Gnangara Road.

In 2006, the estate was removed from Ellenbrook and transferred to its own postal suburb of Aveley. Swan Valley Anglican Community School also opened in Aveley at the beginning of the year, following construction by Multiplex.

Multiplex transferred all of their interests in Aveley to Stockland during an asset swap deal in 2011. Stockland took over all design, planning, sales and marketing of the Vale project.

The suburb gained its first facilities from 2012 onwards, including the state school Aveley Primary School and The Vale Town Centre shops and neighbourhood centre.

== Geography ==
Aveley is bounded by Henley Brook Avenue to the west and Gnangara Road to the south. The Ellen Brook separates Aveley from Belhus to the east. It blends seamlessly into the Ellenbrook village of Coolamon to the north-west, and forms a contiguous suburban zone with Ellenbrook.

Aveley has 114 hectares of wetland and bush forever reserves spanning the middle of the suburb. Most of these have linkages back to the Ellen Brook catchment. A seepage from the Gnangara Mound, known as the Egerton Seepage exists in the north-west of the suburb within the wetland reserves.

Topographically, most of Aveley sits on even ground between 25-30 metres above sea level. The Ellen Brook cuts through a steep valley to the east. The western edge of the suburb is situated on a large hill on the Gnangara Mound, reaching 50 metres above sea level.

== Demographics ==
At the 2021 Australian census, Aveley had a population of 13,998. 48.4% of Aveley residents were male and 51.6% were female. Aveley's median age was 31, much lower than the state and national average of 38. The most common ancestries in Aveley as of 2021 were English (35.7%), Australian (30.1%), Scottish (8%), Irish (6.6%) and Indian (6%). 2.6% of residents identified as Aboriginal and/or Torres Strait Islander. 61.2% of residents were born in Australia.

=== Politics ===
Aveley is part of the Hasluck electorate at the federal level and the Swan Hills district at the state level. The suburb has three polling booths located at its schools. The results below are a combination of the most recent results:

2022 federal election Source: AEC
Labor	41.09%
Liberal	28.28%
Greens	9.48%
One Nation	3.88%
Independent	3.7%

2021 state election Source: WAEC
Labor	70.5%
Liberal	12.77%
Greens	5.24%
Christians	3.9%
WAxit	1.92%

== Facilities and services ==
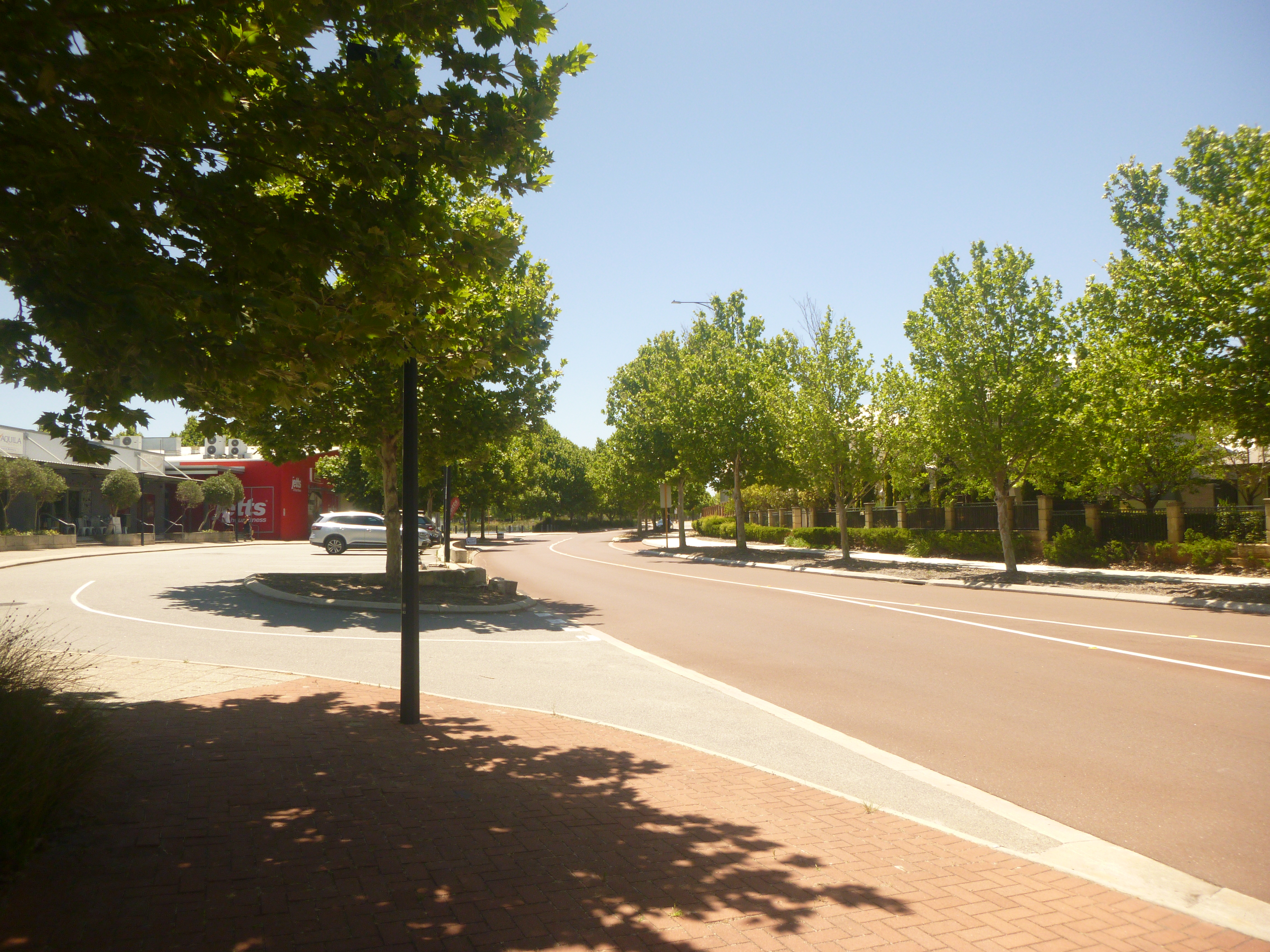
Vale Town Centre on Egerton Drive

Aveley is a self-sufficient community with an abundance of interior retail and service offerings. There are two primary neighbourhood centre areas, both located on Egerton Drive - one in the north at Millhouse Road and the other in the south, known as The Vale Town Centre. Both provide a range of shops and services such as grocery stores, cafes, takeaway restaurants, medical centres and pharmacies, as well as a service station and a gymnasium. A third commercial zone comprising mostly fast food restaurants exists in the south-west corner of the suburb on Gnangara Road.

On top of these, the suburb is also in close proximity to the town centre and commercial areas of neighbouring Ellenbrook. Police, fire and ambulance services are all provided from local stations in Ellenbrook.

There are two early learning centres in the suburb and two state primary schools - Aveley Primary School and Aveley North Primary School. High school students fall into the catchment for Aveley Secondary College, located on the boundary with Ellenbrook in the north. There is also a private Anglican school, Swan Valley Anglican Community School, which serves pre-kindergarten to year 12 inclusive.

An Anglican church, the Chapel of the Holy Wisdom of God, is co-located within the grounds of Swan Valley Anglican Community School. It comprises the Anglican Parish of Ellenbrook.

The Ellenbrook Sports Hub, comprising four soccer fields and clubrooms, is located in the north of the suburb, adjacent to Ellenbrook's District Centre town area.

Electricity is supplied to the suburb via Western Power's Henley Brook substation.

== Transport ==
=== Roads ===
Aveley is situated at the eastern end of Gnangara Road (State Route 84), a major metropolitan highway linking the area to the Swan Valley in the east and Tonkin Highway to the west. Millhouse Road in the north is classified as a District Distributor B road, linking Aveley to Ellenbrook, The Vines and Upper Swan.

=== Train and bus ===
The closest railway station and Transperth public transport hub is Ellenbrook station on the Ellenbrook line.

The following Transperth bus services run throughout the suburb:

- 310 Ellenbrook Station to Midland Station – serves Millhouse Road
- 340 Ellenbrook Station to Ellenbrook (Annies Landing Estate) – serves The Broadway
- 343 Ellenbrook Station to Aveley Secondary College – serves Millhouse Road, Holdsworth Avenue, Verbana Drive and Cashman Avenue
- 345 Ellenbrook Station to Bullsbrook Town Centre – serves Millhouse Road
- 346 Ellenbrook Station to Aveley – serves Ingham Street, Flecker Promenade, Turkich Parade, Rivington Entrance, Windermere Boulevard, Hancock Avenue, Vidalia Drive and Millhouse Road
- 348 Ellenbrook Station to Australian Islamic College (Henley Brook) – serves Millhouse Road, Amethyst Parkway and Henley Brook Avenue
- 349 Ellenbrook Station to Whiteman Park Station – serves Gnangara Road
