= Ellenbrook, Western Australia =

Ellenbrook
- Suburb
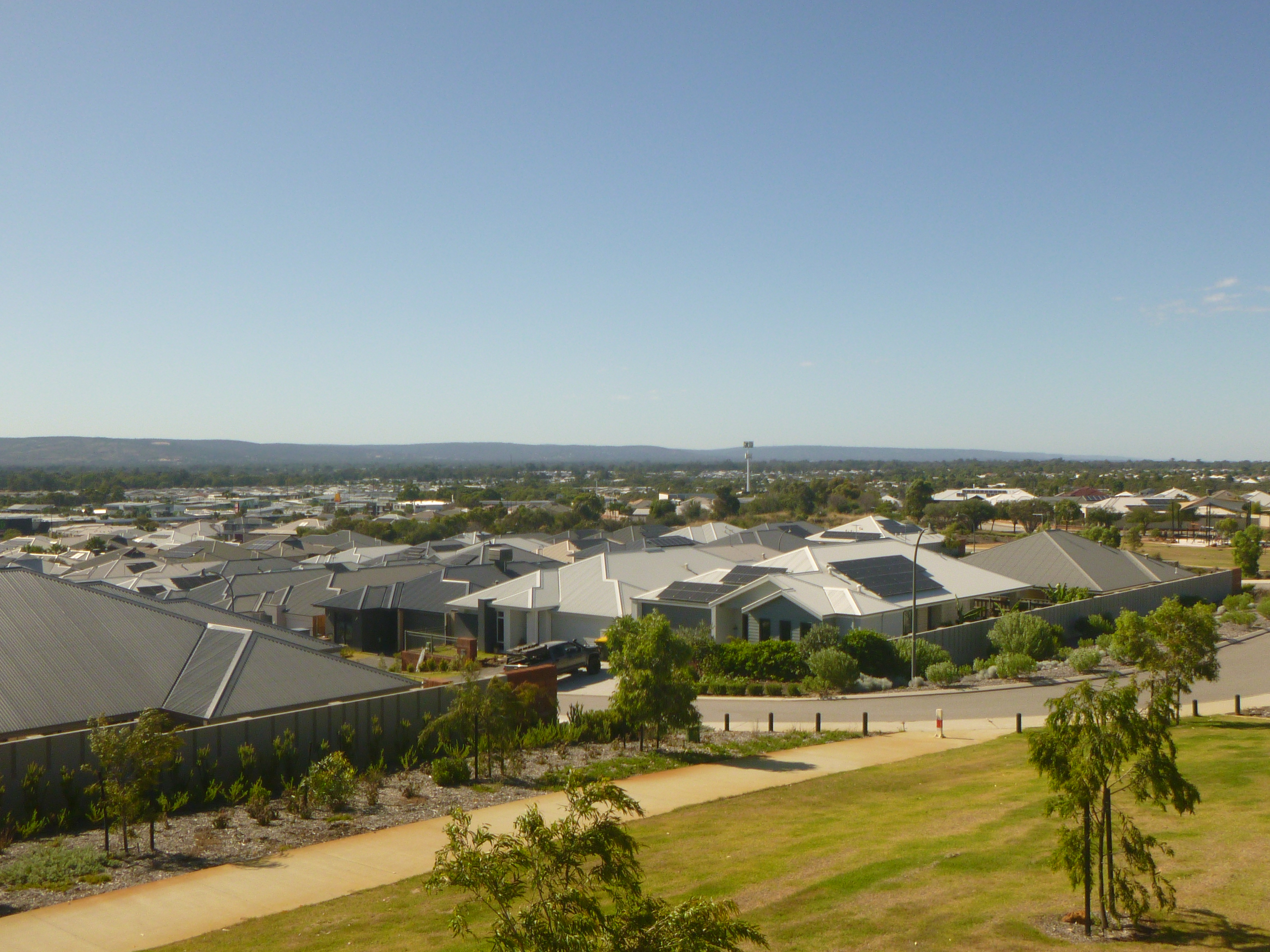
- view from within Malvern Springs
- Interactive map of Ellenbrook
- Coordinates: 31.765°S 115.988°E
- Country: Australia
- State: Western Australia
- City: Perth
- LGA: City of Swan
- Established: 1992

Government
  - State electorate: Swan Hills, West Swan
  - Federal division: Hasluck

Area
  - Total: 13.1 km^{2} (5.1 sq mi)

Population
  - Total: 24,668 (SAL 2021)
- Postcode: 6069
Suburbs around Ellenbrook
Melaleuca	Bullsbrook	The Vines
Lexia	Ellenbrook	The Vines
Henley Brook	Aveley	Aveley

Ellenbrook is an outer suburb and planned community in Perth, Western Australia, within the City of Swan local government area. It is 28 km (17 mi) north-east of Perth's central business district and 18 km (11 mi) north of the regional metropolitan centre of Midland. It was first developed in the 1990s as a joint venture between the Government of Western Australia and private landowners in the area.

Ellenbrook is a designated secondary activity centre within the Perth metropolitan area, serving Perth's north-eastern corridor. It forms a contiguous urban area with the adjoining communities of The Vines, Aveley and Henley Brook.

== History ==
=== Name ===
The name Ellenbrook is derived from the nearby Ellen Brook waterway, which in turn was named after Ellen Stirling, the wife of Western Australia's first governor, James Stirling. The road Ellen Stirling Parade in the town centre is also named after her.

=== Early history and industrial use ===
Prior to development, Ellenbrook comprised uninhabited banksia and sheoak woodlands and wetlands, which were used by transient Whadjuk Noongar people for hunting. Two remnant aboriginal artefact scatter sites were previously identified by surveyors around Gnangara Road. A camp site, DAA ID 15120 was also identified in the Lexia wetlands in the far north.

The beginning of the Swan River Colony in 1829 brought a system of land grants for pioneering settlers. The Ellenbrook area was contained within the western halves of two land grants, Swan Location 1 and Swan Location A. After 1838, with little having been done to the area, landowners George Leake and William Burges both surrendered the future western Ellenbrook portions of their grants back to the British Crown, due to the poor agricultural value of their Bassendean sands soils making any land uses uneconomical to pursue. By contrast, the areas that they retained around the river and its streams, such as Belhus, went on to become profitable farms and estates.

The area became a part of the newly-established Swan Road District local government area towards the end of the 19th century. The 20th century saw scattered industrial uses pursued in Ellenbrook, such as the Gnangara Pine Plantation, established by the state Forests Department in the early 1900s. The Gnangara Settlement, a residential townsite for forestry workers was built in the area, along with a timber mill on Weatherill Road, which is now modern day Forestview Park. Later in the 1970s, Boral leased the land around Gnangara Road to start a sand quarrying operation. Both land uses came to an end shortly before Ellenbrook's development.

The postal locality system was introduced into the area in 1972, splitting Ellenbrook across two new localities, Belhus and Upper Swan.

=== Joint venture formation and first village ===
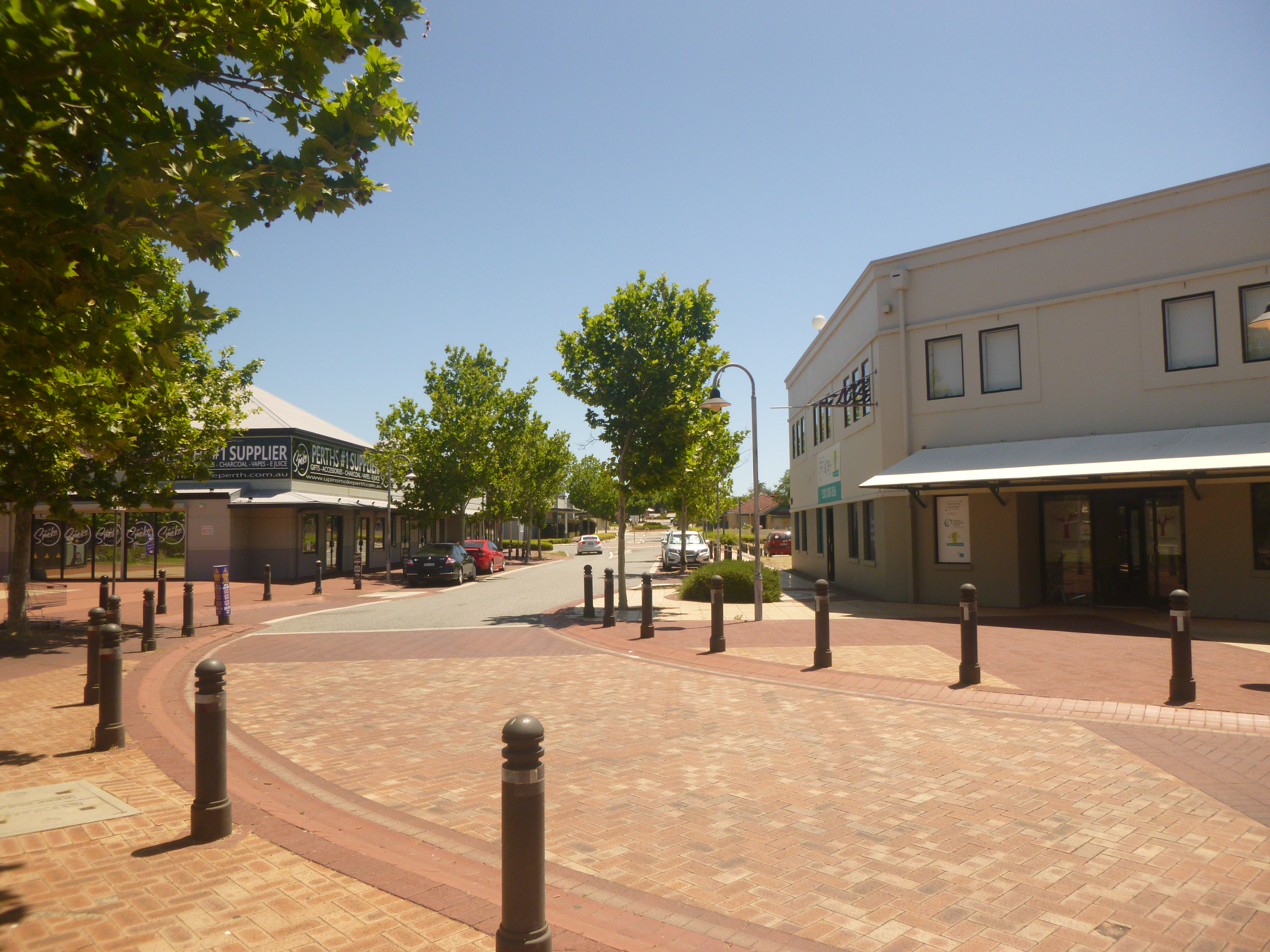
Woodlake village centre on Highpoint Boulevard

The lands in Ellenbrook were first highlighted for metropolitan expansion in a 1987 review of the Corridor Plan for Perth by the WA State Planning Commission. By then, the Belhus half had been purchased by the WA government's State Housing Commission (Homeswest) with the intent to develop social housing. The Upper Swan half had been purchased by Japanese developer Sanwa Vines Pty Ltd as part of their project to build a golf course resort, The Vines Resort & Country Club, which officially opened to the public in 1989. It offered a 27-hole golf course, a hotel, a leisure & function complex and an attached 390-lot rural residential estate, which marked the beginning of suburban development in the Ellenbrook area.

The Department of Planning and Urban Development declared Ellenbrook a growth corridor for Perth in their 1990 'Metroplan' policy publication, prompting the land-owners in the area to commence preliminary re-zoning discussions with the Shire and various agencies of the State Government. The proposed name "Ellenbrook" was approved by the Department of Land Administration in 1990, leading to the gazettal of Ellenbrook as a suburb in 1992, out of the western parts of Belhus and Upper Swan. The new locality's boundaries included all of the lands owned by Homeswest and Sanwa, as well as The Vines estate and also the Egerton Stud estate in the south-east, which was owned by Multiplex.

Sanwa and Homeswest then formed a new joint venture company, Ellenbrook Management Pty Ltd, to coordinate planning and delivery of the new Ellenbrook townsite. The venture was a 53%-47% split between Sanwa and Homeswest respectively and controlled a combined 1,308 hectares of land in the project area. At the time, it was the biggest public-private partnership ever undertaken in Western Australia and it became a model for future suburban developments. Multiplex was also invited, but declined to join the venture.

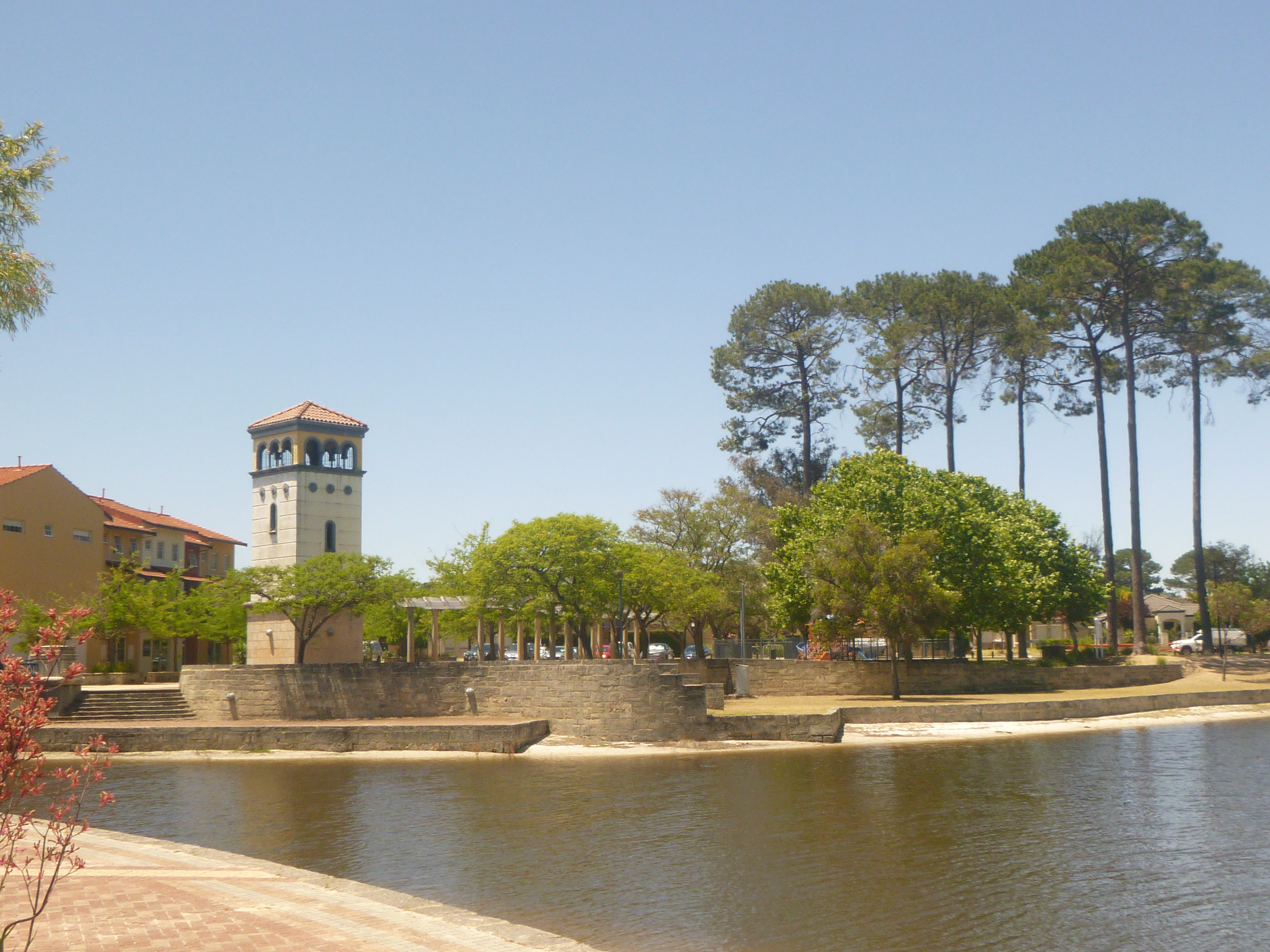
Lake Fresca in The Bridges

The Environmental Protection Authority released its report on the development in mid-1992, approving the project to go ahead subject to various environmental approvals, including the requirement to surrender 450 hectares of wetlands in the north of the project area for conservation. This was reduced to 270 hectares in 1994, with the remaining amount satisfied by what is now adjacent conservation land in Melaleuca to the west. In exchange, 284 hectares of the state-owned Gnangara Plantation in the south-west was excised and granted to the joint venture for urban development.

With environmental approvals granted, preparations for infrastructure works began throughout 1994, with brand new water and sewerage headworks for the town constructed by Water Corporation, via a special agreement for the joint venture to pay back the costs of the infrastructure over the lifetime of the project. This allowed development of 'Village 1', Woodlake to begin in 1995, and the Ellenbrook suburb was declared 'open' by the State Government in September 1995. The Vines estate was subsequently excised from Ellenbrook and became its own suburb in 1996.

Ellenbrook's first primary school, Ellenbrook Primary School, opened in 1996 as a 'school in houses', with classrooms in residential houses to cater for the immediate demand of new residents. The school moved to a purpose-built facility in Woodlake in 1997, which was followed by the opening of St Helena's Catholic Primary School nearby in 1999. That same year, the first shopping centre in Ellenbrook was opened in Woodlake, offering a supermarket, chemist, bank and other community services. Residential development began to expand into Ellenbrook's second designated village, The Bridges, towards the end of the decade.

=== Town centre establishment and suburban expansion ===
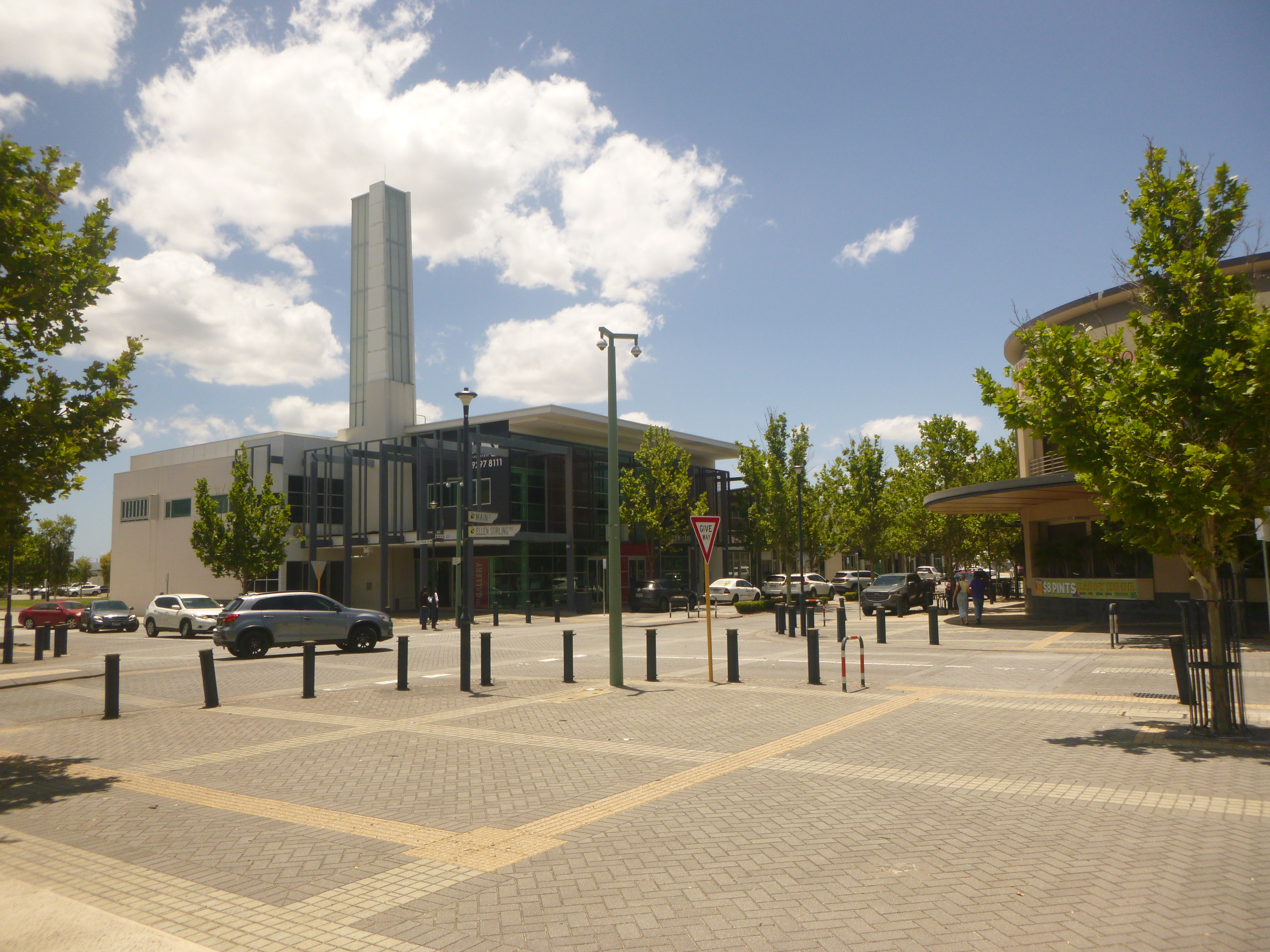
Main Street in the Town Centre

The 2000s began with Sanwa's withdrawal from the Ellenbrook project, divesting their 53% stake of the joint venture to Morella Pty Ltd - a syndicate of Australian families, investors and developers, including Clough, Delfin and Milton Corporation. The syndicate was led by Danny Murphy, the outgoing Managing Director of Sanwa's Australian operations. Upon conclusion of the divestment, Murphy set up an independent land development company, LWP Property Group Pty Ltd, to take over project management and represent the syndicate's interests.

Ellenbrook's expansion continued into the early 2000s, reaching several development, town planning and population milestones. The area's first high school, the private non-denominational Ellenbrook Christian College, opened to enrolments in 2001. The new villages of Coolamon and Charlotte's Vineyard were built and released in the north, bringing in thousands of new residents, along with The Pines, Ellenbrook's first over-55s retirement village. The Town Centre precinct was built and released for commercial land uses, starting in 2004 with The Shops at Ellenbrook - the first shopping mall in the area, featuring Woolworths as its anchor tenant and first full-line supermarket. The town centre also saw Swan Hills district MP Jaye Radisich establish her electorate office there, starting a trend that subsequent MPs have since followed.

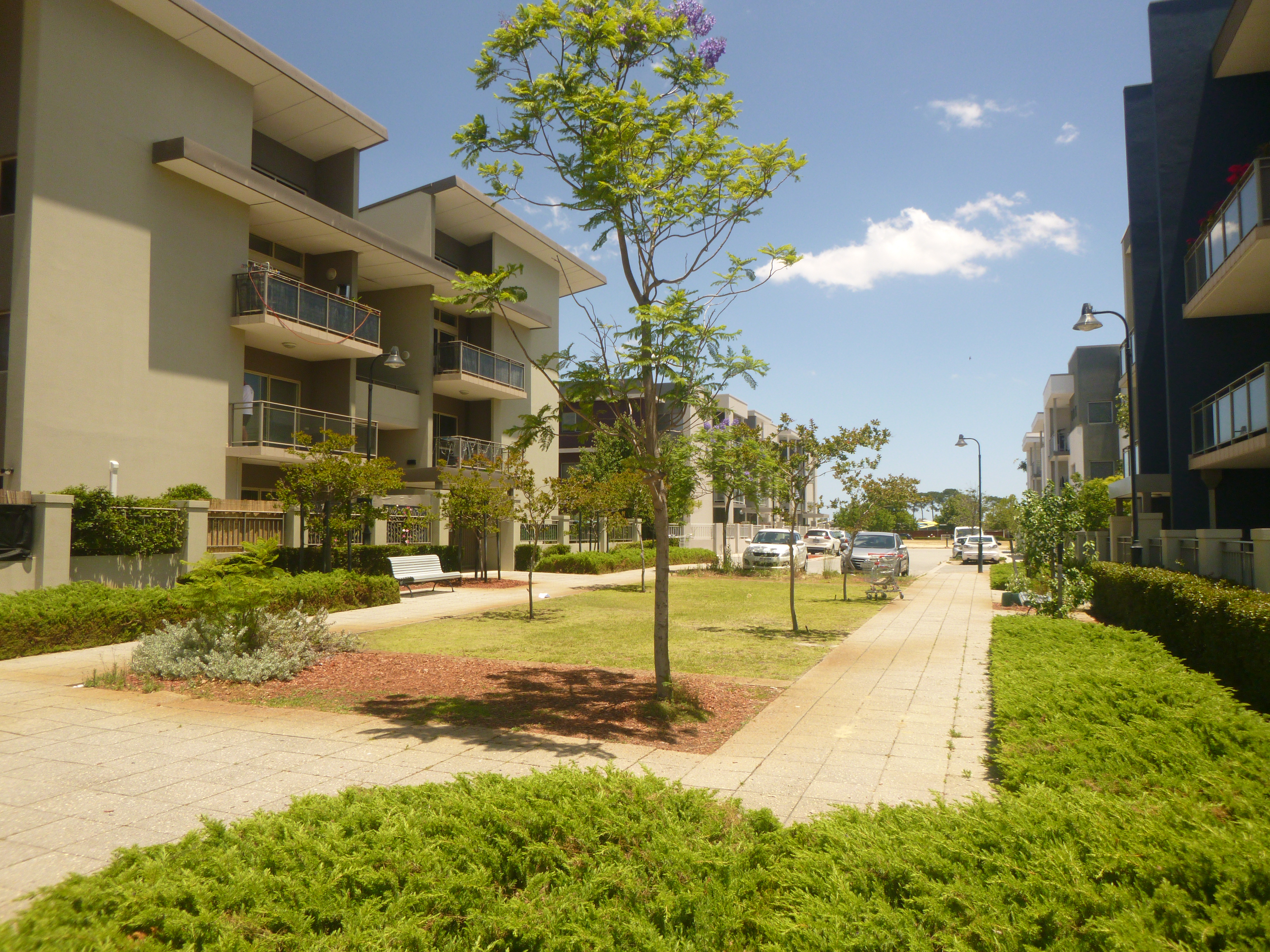
Apartment precinct on The Parkway

In 2006, the rural Egerton Stud area of Ellenbrook was split into the new suburb of Aveley, which owners Multiplex had begun to develop separately.

During the campaign for the 2008 Western Australian election, contenders Alan Carpenter and Colin Barnett both publicly pledged to build a new passenger rail line for Ellenbrook if elected. The 15 km line was expected to cost $850 million and be completed in 2015. However, the election winner Barnett announced in May 2010 that he had cancelled the project, declaring it uneconomical to proceed with, which attracted harsh criticism of the Liberal government.

Town Centre retail and facility expansion progressed towards the end of the decade, with The Brook Bar and Bistro tavern, the Ellenbrook Community Library and Ellenbrook Secondary College all opening on Main Street, along with the stage two expansion of The Shops at Ellenbrook which added an extra 24,000m^{2} of retail floor space. The final villages of Lexia and Annie's Landing in the far north were released in 2011 and 2013 respectively, followed by Lawley Private Estate - a 12 hectare pocket of land in Charlotte's Vineyard that was owned by Mt Lawley Pty Ltd and excluded from the joint venture.

=== Later developments ===
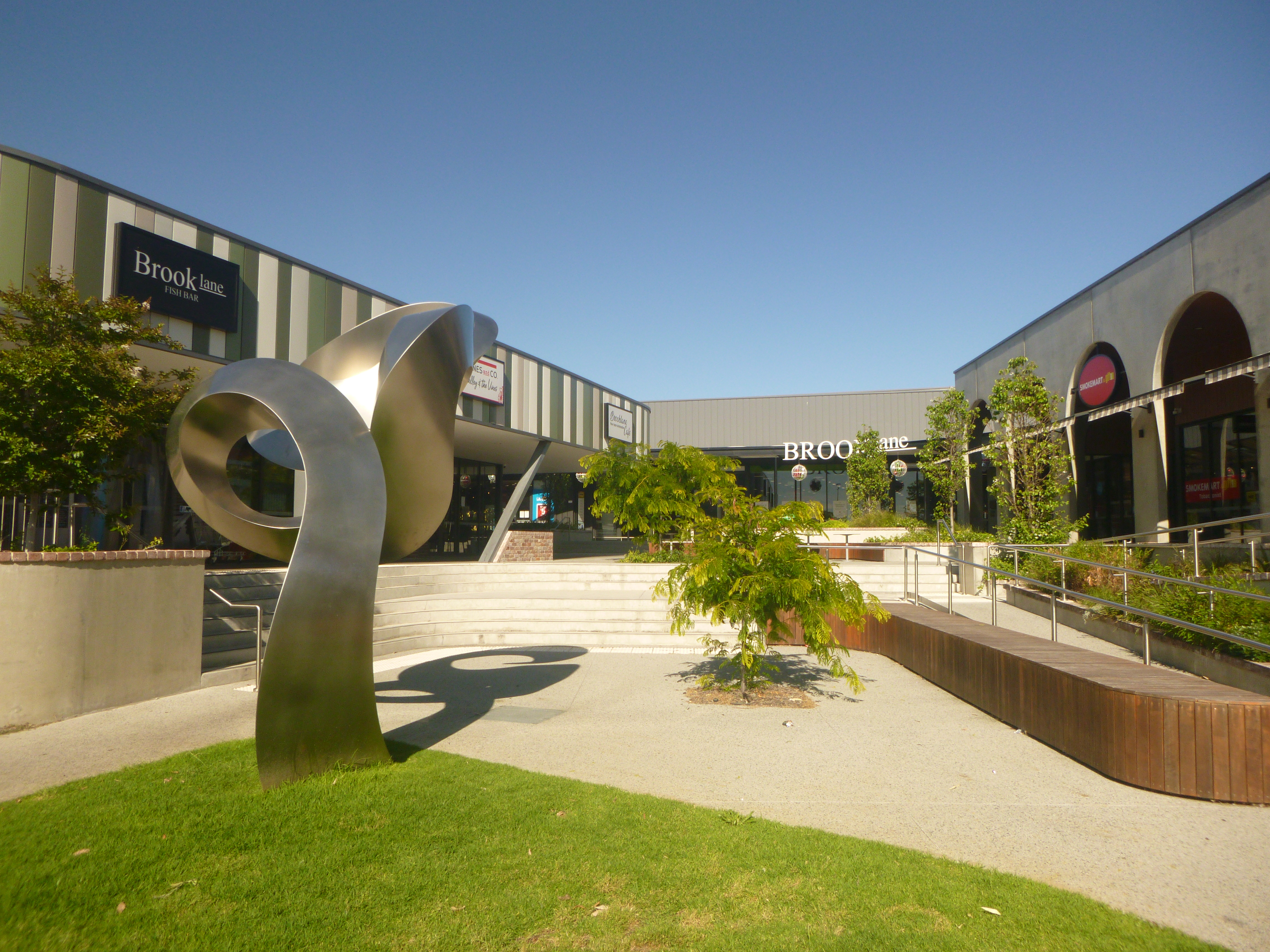
Brooklane Shopping Centre in the District Centre

Ellenbrook's second state high school, Aveley Secondary College was opened in 2018, followed by Brooklane shopping centre adjacent to it in 2020 - both leading to the creation of the District Centre, Ellenbrook's third neighbourhood town centre for the north of the suburb. The original Town Centre area also began to be built out with townhouses, medium-density apartments and microlot houses. The Shops, by this point rebranded to Ellenbrook Central after being sold to Vicinity Centres, saw its stage 3 expansion completed in 2020, taking it to 118 tenancies across 47,000m^{2} of retail floor space.

The end of the 2010s saw substantial investments into public transport works for Ellenbrook. The Perth to Darwin National Highway project saw the extension of Tonkin Highway (State Route 4) to Ellenbrook, providing a full north–south freeway link and two interchanges at Gnangara Road and The Promenade at its completion in 2019. Simultaneously, the stalled Ellenbrook railway line project was revived upon the election of Mark McGowan's Labor government, with construction of the line and its accompanying town centre terminus station commencing in 2022. The line and station officially opened to the public in December 2024, connecting Ellenbrook to Perth and the rest of the Transperth rail network.

== Neighbourhoods ==
Ellenbrook's development was staged over two decades via a series of residential villages and town centres. Each village possesses its own distinct theme in housing, streetscape, landscape architecture and dwelling types.

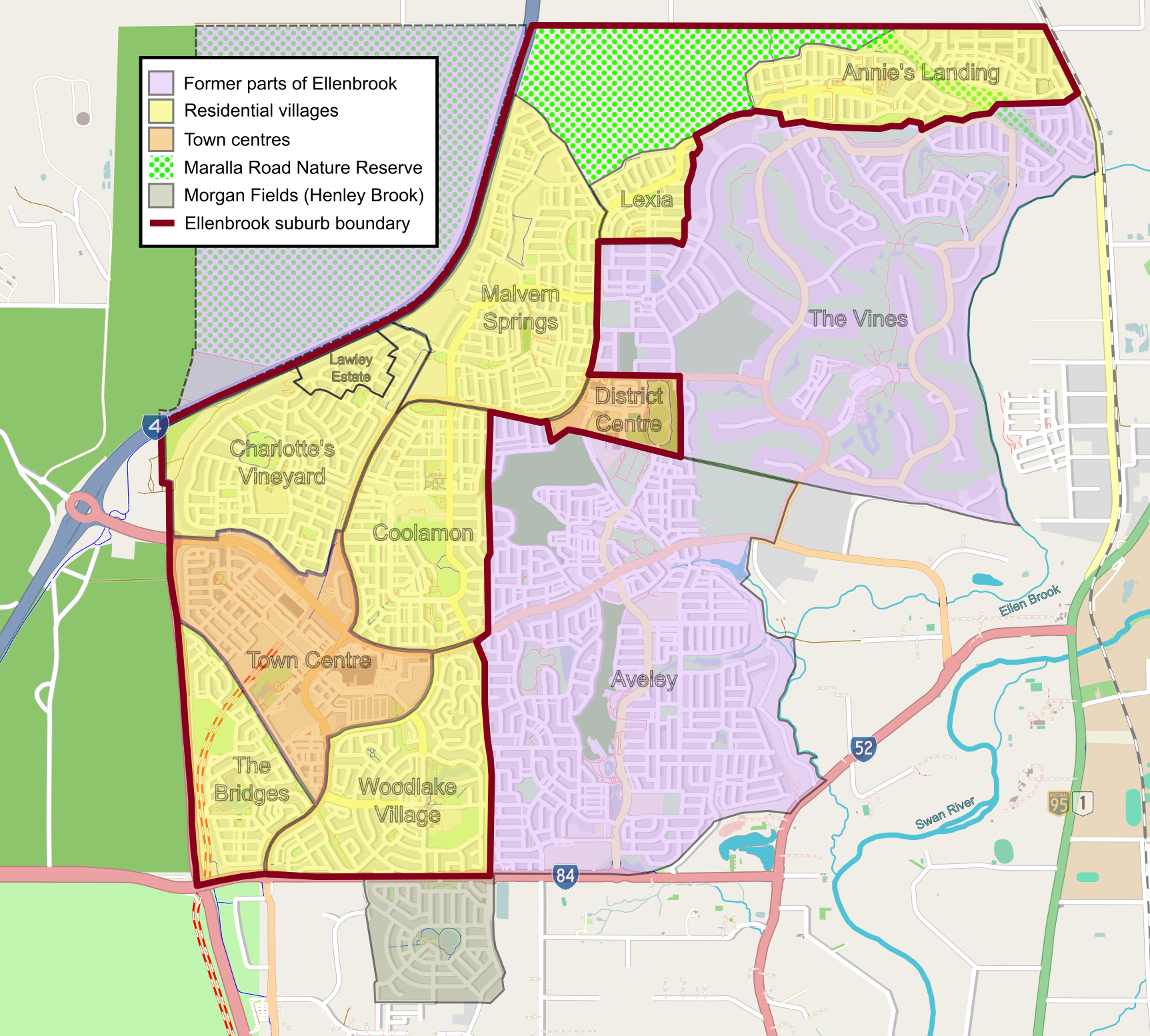
A map of Ellenbrook and its constituent villages

Neighbourhood	Theme	First Release	Area
Woodlake Village	Return to Nature	1995	132ha
The Bridges	Mediterranean	1997	87ha
Coolamon	Contemporary Australian	1999	146ha
Morgan Fields^{a}	Equestrian	2000	75ha
Charlotte's Vineyard^{b}	Swan Valley	2003	156ha
Town Centre		2003	163ha
Malvern Springs	Naturaliste	2006	167ha
Lexia^{c}	Health	2011	35ha
District Centre		2011	33ha
Annie's Landing	Avon Valley	2013	99ha

^a: Morgan Fields is part of the suburb of Henley Brook, but was included in the Ellenbrook joint venture and its community master plan
^b: Includes the Lawley Private Estate
^c: Unrelated to the locality of the same name west of Ellenbrook

A range of different dwelling types are present across the villages, from apartments, micro-lots and townhouses to two-storey houses, large acreages and over-55s retirement housing. One of the primary town planning principles for the villages was to cater to as wide an array of ages, vocations and abilities as possible.

8,056 occupied dwellings were reported at the 2021 Australian census, along with 509 unoccupied dwellings. 89.3% of dwellings in Ellenbrook are separate individual houses, 9% are semi-detached/terraced/townhouses and only 1.6% are apartments. As a joint venture partner, the state Department of Housing reserved one in every 12 lots developed in Ellenbrook for social and affordable housing.

== Geography ==
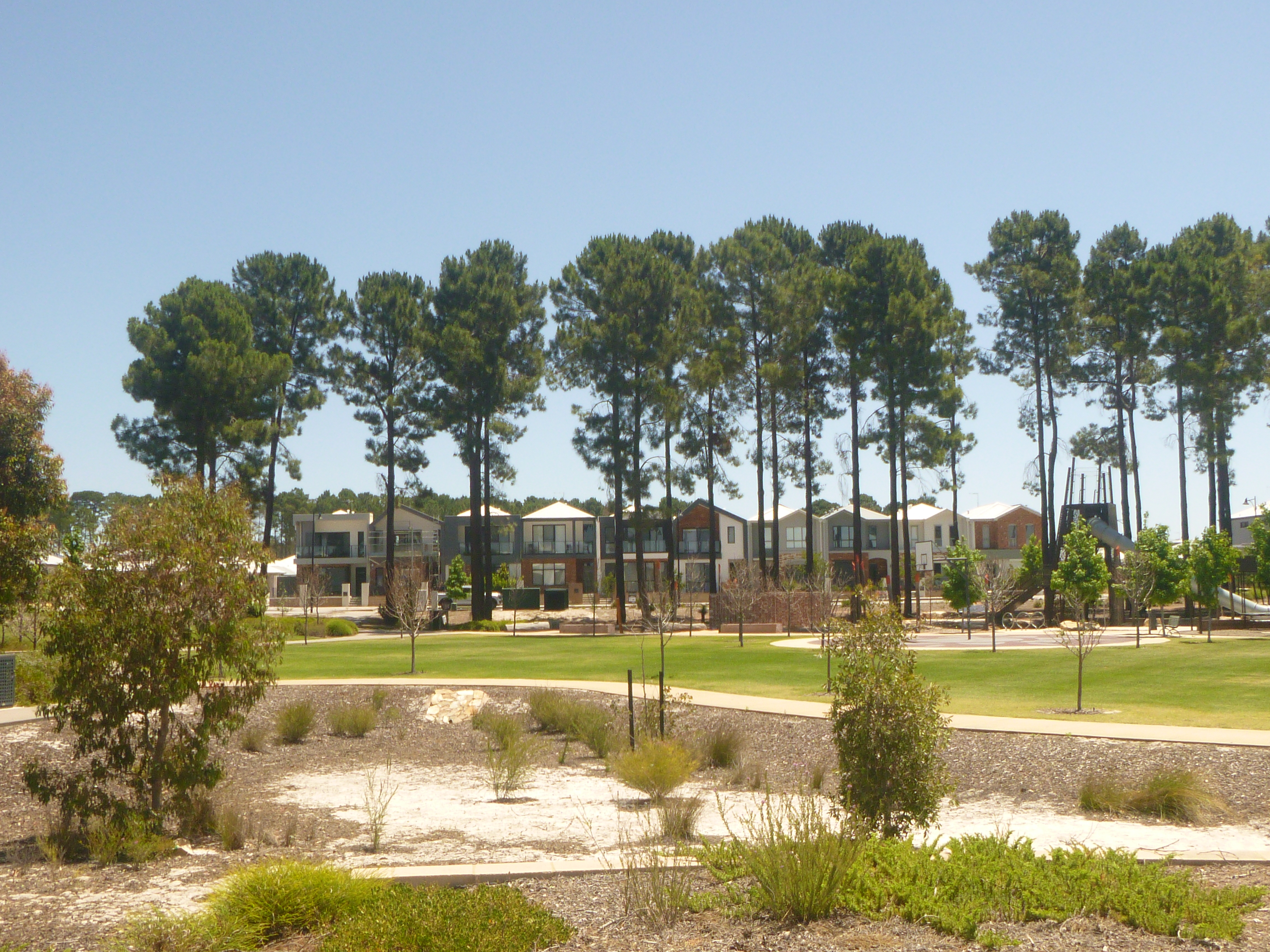
Townhouses amongst remnant pine trees in Hesperia Park

Ellenbrook is bounded by the Tonkin Highway to the west, Gnangara Road and Henley Brook to the south and Maralla Road and Bullsbrook to the north. The Millendon Junction to Narngulu railway line forms part of the boundary in the north-east. Its eastern boundaries are blended across the adjoining suburbs of The Vines and Aveley, both of which were formerly part of Ellenbrook in earlier years. The removal of these suburbs also removed the Ellen Brook from Ellenbrook's boundaries.

The Gnangara pine plantation in the locality of Lexia is situated west of Tonkin Highway, while the localities of Whiteman and Cullacabardee lie to the south and south-west of Gnangara Road. These three rural areas originally segregated Ellenbrook from the frontier of the Perth metropolitan area, making it a 'leapfrog' development. With suburban development occurring in Henley Brook and Brabham to the south, this is no longer the case and Ellenbrook now forms part of the contiguous Swan Urban Growth Corridor.

The suburb is situated in the south-east corner of the Gnangara Mound, on top of prominent subterranean water flows that discharge into the Ellen Brook. Surface soils consist of Bassendean sands, with most of Ellenbrook sitting atop a large Bassendean dune ridge between 40-50 metres above sea level. Parts of Coolamon and Malvern Springs are situated at dune peaks of 65 metres, while the northern village of Annie's Landing is significantly lower, at an elevation of only 25 metres within the plains of the Sawpit Gully.

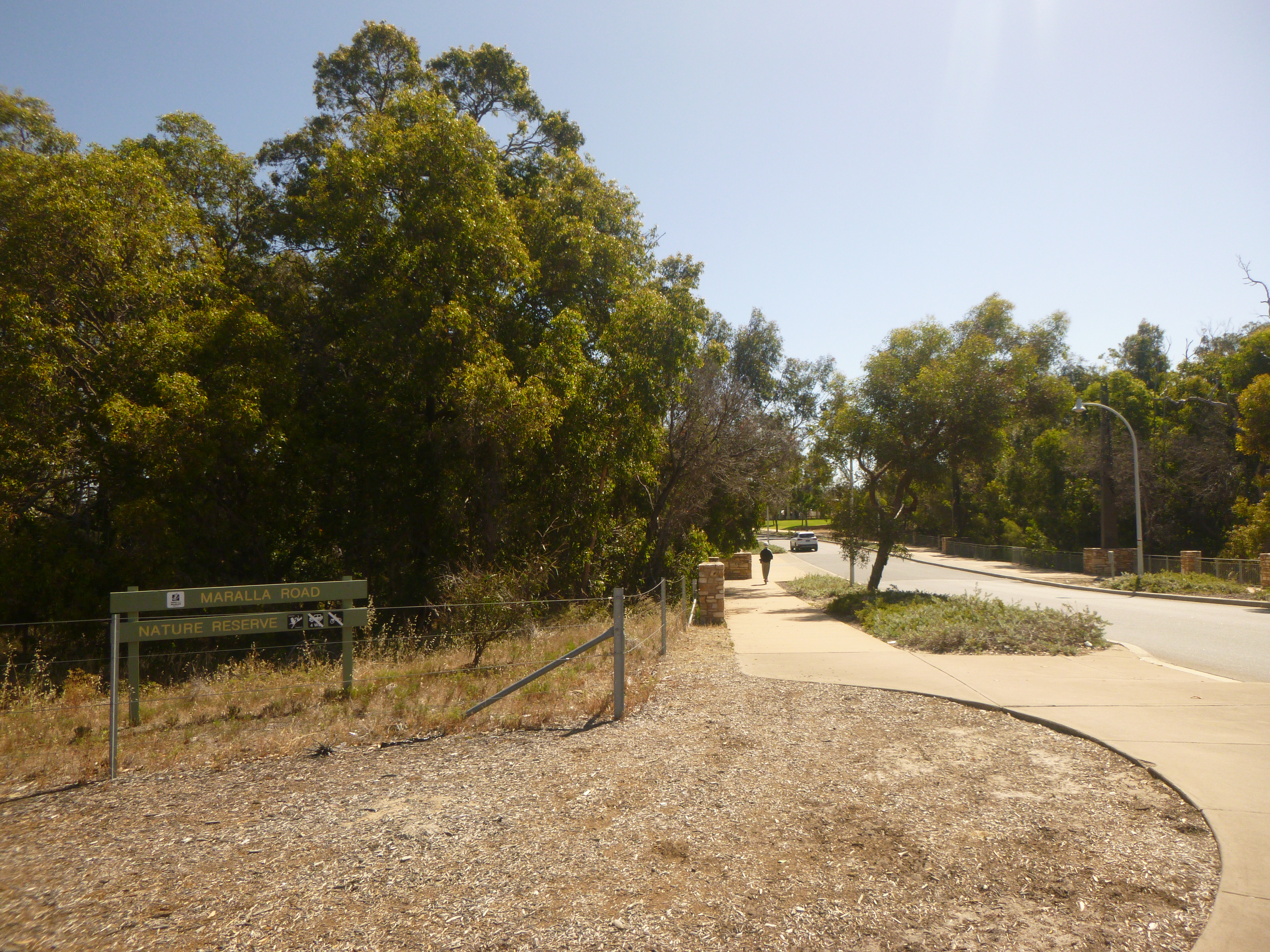
Road bridge across the Sawpit Gully in Annie's Landing

The north of Ellenbrook contains a 158-hectare portion of the Maralla Road Nature Reserve, a 590-hectare undisturbed wetland and lake system within the Sawpit Gully catchment. The land was ceded by the Ellenbrook Joint Venture for permanent conservation at the request of the Environmental Protection Authority. It is protected from development under the Perth metropolitan Bush Forever strategy, where it is registered as Bush Forever Site 300. When Tonkin Highway was built through the reserve in 2019, a fauna overpass was built to keep the two sides of the reserve connected.

A further 23 hectares of scattered wetland areas outside of the nature reserve are classified as Conservation Category Wetlands. These wetlands were incorporated into the villages of Malvern Springs and Annie's Landing as public parks and open spaces.

Two of WA's natural gas pipelines, the Dampier to Bunbury Natural Gas Pipeline and the Parmelia Pipeline, both run concurrently through Ellenbrook, along the long and narrow Forestview Park reserve in the south-west.

== Demographics ==
At the 2021 Australian census, 48.8% of Ellenbrook residents were male and 51.2% were female. Ellenbrook's median age was 32, much lower than the state and national average of 38. The most common ancestries in Ellenbrook as of 2021 were English (37%), Australian (30.8%), Scottish (7.6%), Irish (7%) and Indian (4.3%). 3.8% of residents identified as Aboriginal and/or Torres Strait Islander. 63.1% of residents were born in Australia.

The 2021 population of Ellenbrook was 24,668. Historically, the population saw its biggest jump at the 2006 census with a reported 10,477 inhabitants, a 91% increase over the 2001 reported population of 5,478. It continued to increase each census year, by 55% to 16,284 in 2011 and by 39% to 22,681 in 2016, in line with new suburban developments throughout the 2000s and 2010s.

At the 2016 census, approximately 5,300 people worked locally in Ellenbrook's town and neighbourhood centres, with more than 50% of them working in the education, retail and hospitality industries.

=== Politics ===
At the federal level, Ellenbrook is part of the Hasluck electorate. At the state level, Ellenbrook is split in half - Annie's Landing, Lexia, Malvern Springs, the District Centre and Coolamon are all part of the Swan Hills district, while the remainder forms part of the neighbouring West Swan district.

Ellenbrook has seven polling booths located throughout the suburb, mostly at its primary schools. The results below are a combination of the most recent results:

2022 federal election Source: AEC
Labor	42.84%
Liberal	28.35%
Greens	7.48%
One Nation	3.55%
Independent	3.3%

2021 state election Source: WAEC
Labor	71.74%
Liberal	22.5%
Greens	4.45%
NMV	2.85%
Christians	2.79%

== Facilities, services and amenities ==
Ellenbrook is considered a major activity hub for Perth's north-eastern corridor and is designated a secondary metropolitan centre within the City of Swan, providing facilities and services for a wide catchment area. Midland is the nearest primary metropolitan centre for government support services such as St John of God Midland Hospital, Centrelink, the Department of Transport centre and the Midland Magistrates Court.

=== Emergency services ===
The Ellenbrook Police Station, located in the town centre, is part of WAPOL's Midland District. It serves the wider area, including the adjacent suburbs of Aveley, The Vines and Henley Brook and the towns of Upper Swan and Bullsbrook. Although the nearest hospital is in Midland, a local ambulance depot and first aid training centre is operated locally in Ellenbrook by St John. Ellenbrook Fire Station, operated by DFES, is located on the border of the suburb in Henley Brook.

=== Retail ===
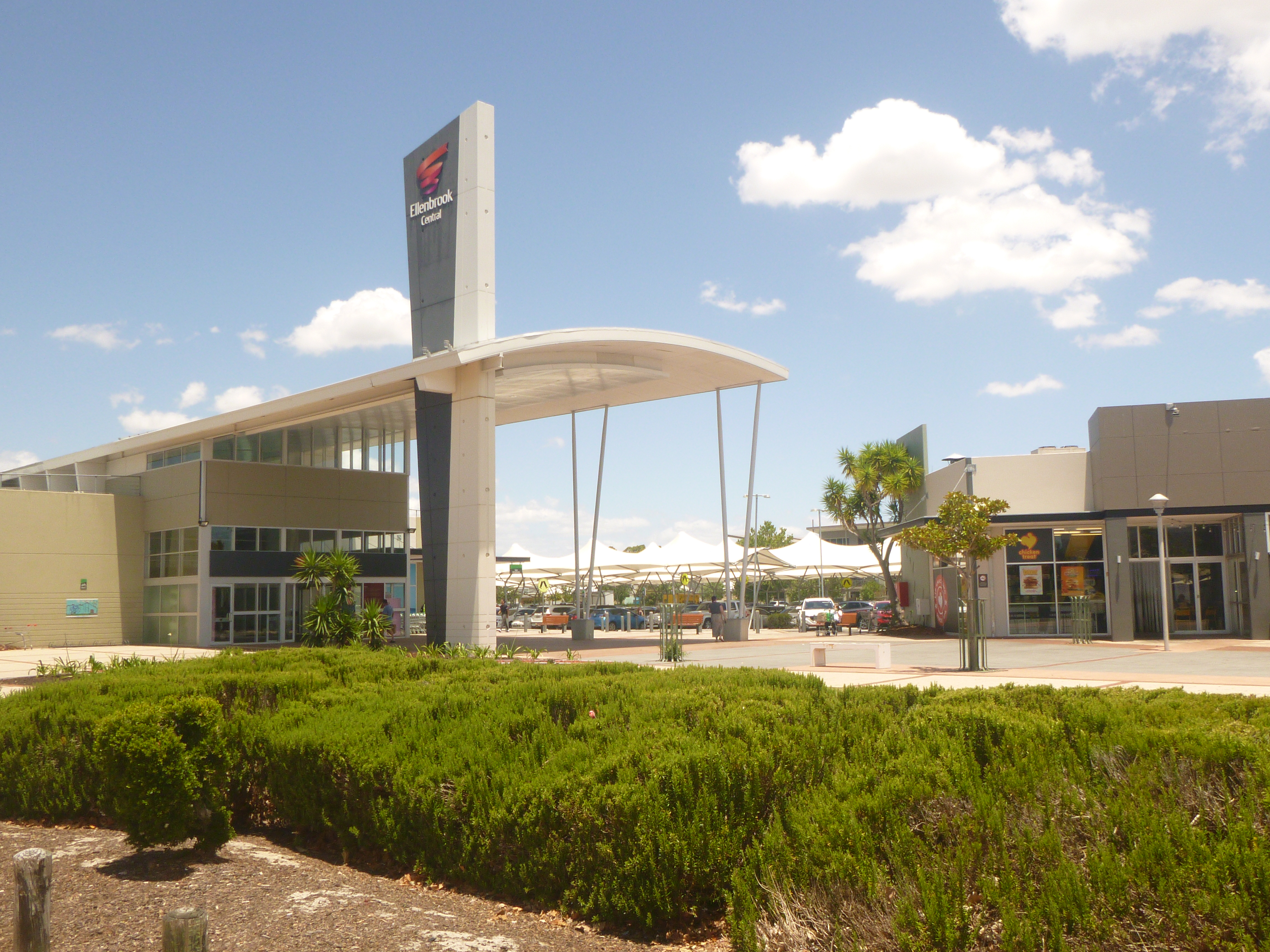
Ellenbrook Central shopping centre

Ellenbrook's central town centre runs along Main Street, providing a variety of cafes, restaurants, health centres and mixed use office developments. Key civic buildings in the town centre include The Shops at Ellenbrook mall, the Ellenbrook railway station & bus interchange and Ellenbrook Community Library, which is co-located within Ellenbrook Secondary College. Outside of Main Street is a large strip of big-box retail malls, service stations and fast food restaurants running along The Promenade, plus a light industrial zone on The Broadway.

In addition, the suburb features two smaller secondary town centres. In the south, Woodlake has its own village centre on Highpoint Boulevard with a range of groceries, health, retail and restaurant offerings and two primary schools in its vicinity. In the north, the District Centre area on Maffina Parade serves the northern villages of Ellenbrook, as well as nearby parts of Aveley and The Vines. The District Centre consists of the Brooklane Shopping Centre, Aveley Secondary College, the Ellenbrook Community Centre and the Ellenbrook District Open Space, as well as the Ellenbrook Sports Hub nearby in Aveley. The precinct features an array of mixed use buildings in between these primary institutions.

=== Community, sports and leisure ===
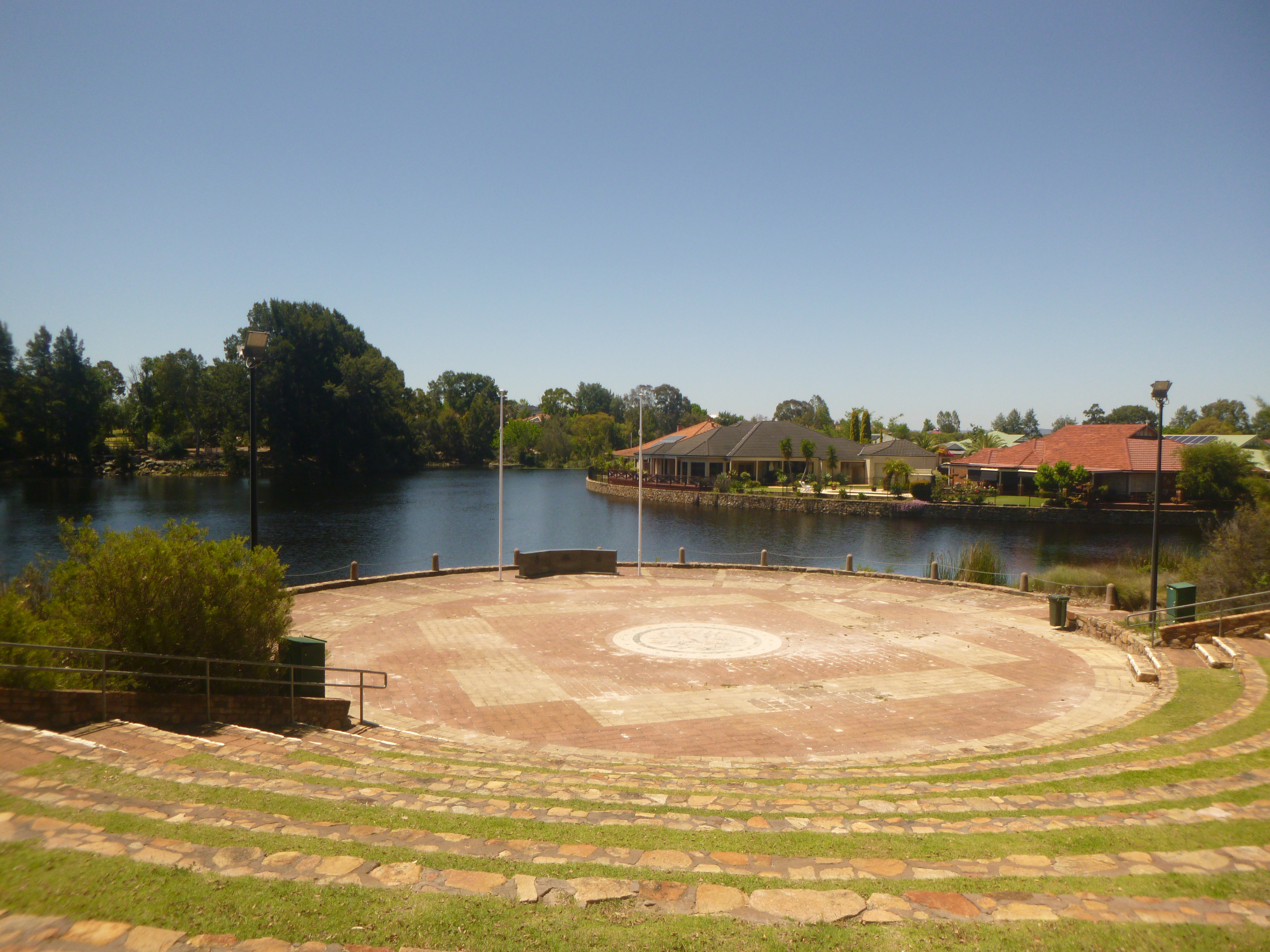
ANZAC memorial in Woodlake Park

The Ellenbrook Arts organisation was founded in 2002 to encourage arts in the local schools and community, with a purpose-built art gallery and head office on Main Street. There is also an Ellenbrook Men's Shed, the Verdant Vista Community Garden and the Ellenbrook Youth Centre, which all encourage crafts, teamwork and socialisation amongst differing age and peer groups. Radio VCA 88.5FM is a community radio station for the Ellenbrook area founded in 2006, with a studio based in Coolamon and transmitted from Brigadoon. Ellenbrook is reported on by the Midland-based Echo News community newspaper, which circulates weekly newspaper drops around the area.

Each village contains an abundance of parks and open spaces, including three dedicated dog parks and four large public sports grounds - Woodlake Sports Ground, Coolamon Oval, Charlotte's Vineyard Oval and Ellenbrook District Open Space. The sports grounds share a mixture of facilities including clubrooms, change rooms, cricket nets, tennis & basketball courts and skateparks. There is also a 25 metre indoor swimming school operated by State Swim, as well as an abundance of gymnasiums located throughout the villages.

Ellenbrook is home to the following local competitive sports clubs:

- Australian rules football: Ellenbrook Eels Senior Football Club, Ellenbrook Dockers Junior Football Club
- Rugby union: Ellenbrook Vipers Rugby Union Club
- Soccer: Ellenbrook United Football Club, Ellenbrook Rovers Christian Football Club
- Cricket: Ellenbrook Rangers Cricket Club
- Bowls: Ellenbrook Bowls Club

An ANZAC war memorial exists in the Woodlake Park Amphitheatre, along with a local RSL sub-branch for Ellenbrook that operates out of the Charlotte's Vineyard Community Centre. The town centre features a memorial garden for prominent resident and local MP Jaye Radisich.

=== Education ===
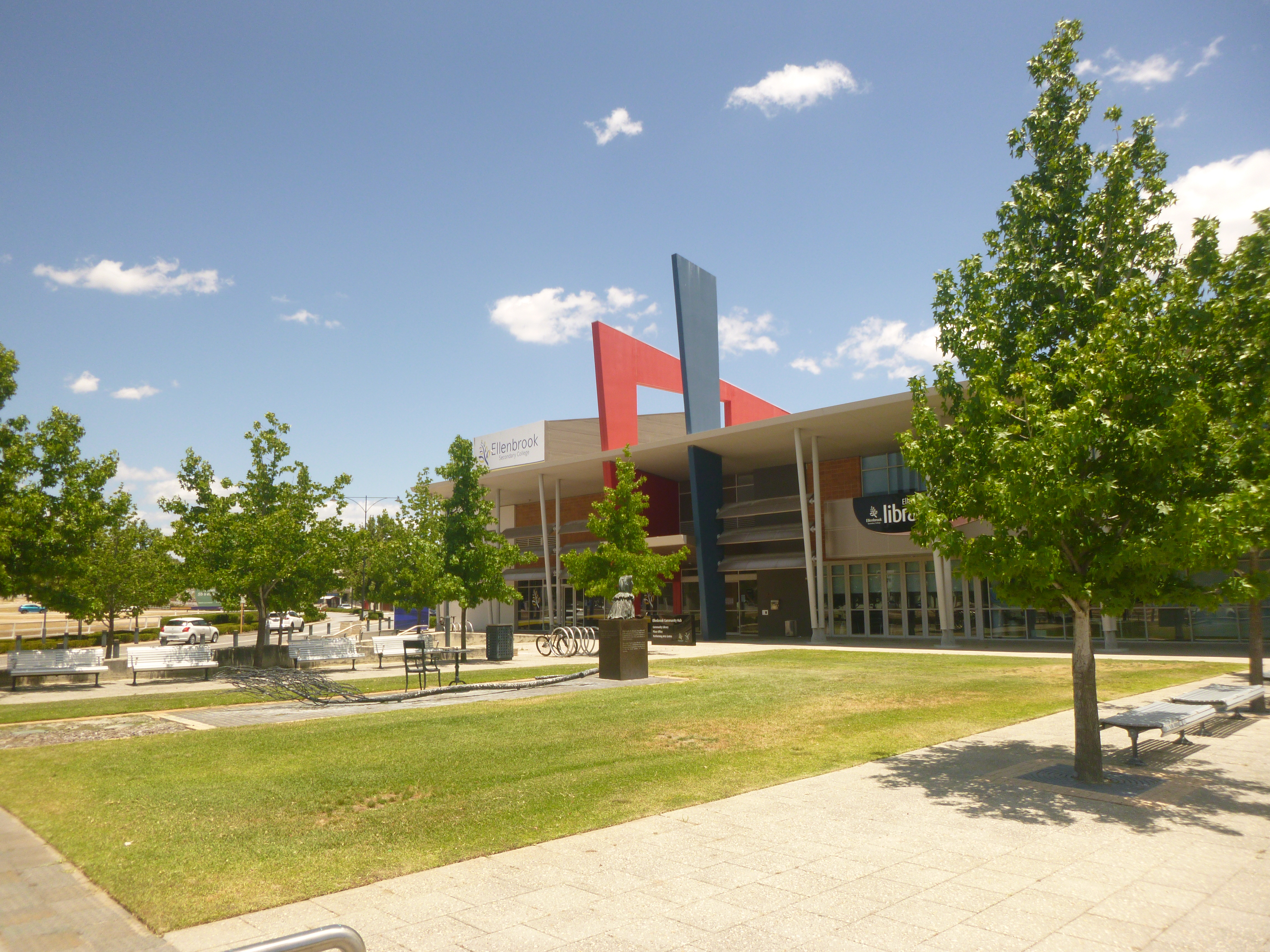
Ellenbrook Library next to Ellenbrook Secondary College

Ellenbrook contains ten schools of various types and catchments. There are five state primary schools - Anne Hamersley Primary School, Arbor Grove Primary School, Ellenbrook Primary School, Ellen Stirling Primary School, and Malvern Springs Primary School, all serving Kindergarten to Year 6. Students finishing Year 6 move to one of two state secondary schools in Ellenbrook, Ellenbrook Secondary College and Aveley Secondary College along a north-south catchment area split.

Additionally, there are three private Christian schools in Ellenbrook - St. Helena's Catholic Primary School, Ellenbrook Christian College and Holy Cross College. St. Helena's is a primary school only, while the latter two offer full K-12 education covering both primary school and secondary school in-house.

There are no tertiary education institutions in Ellenbrook - the nearest TAFE and university campuses are in Midland and Joondalup respectively.

=== Infrastructure ===
Electricity is supplied to the suburb via Western Power's Henley Brook substation, just south of Ellenbrook's boundary on Gnangara Road. A telephone exchange for the area exists in Woodlake Village.

=== Transport ===
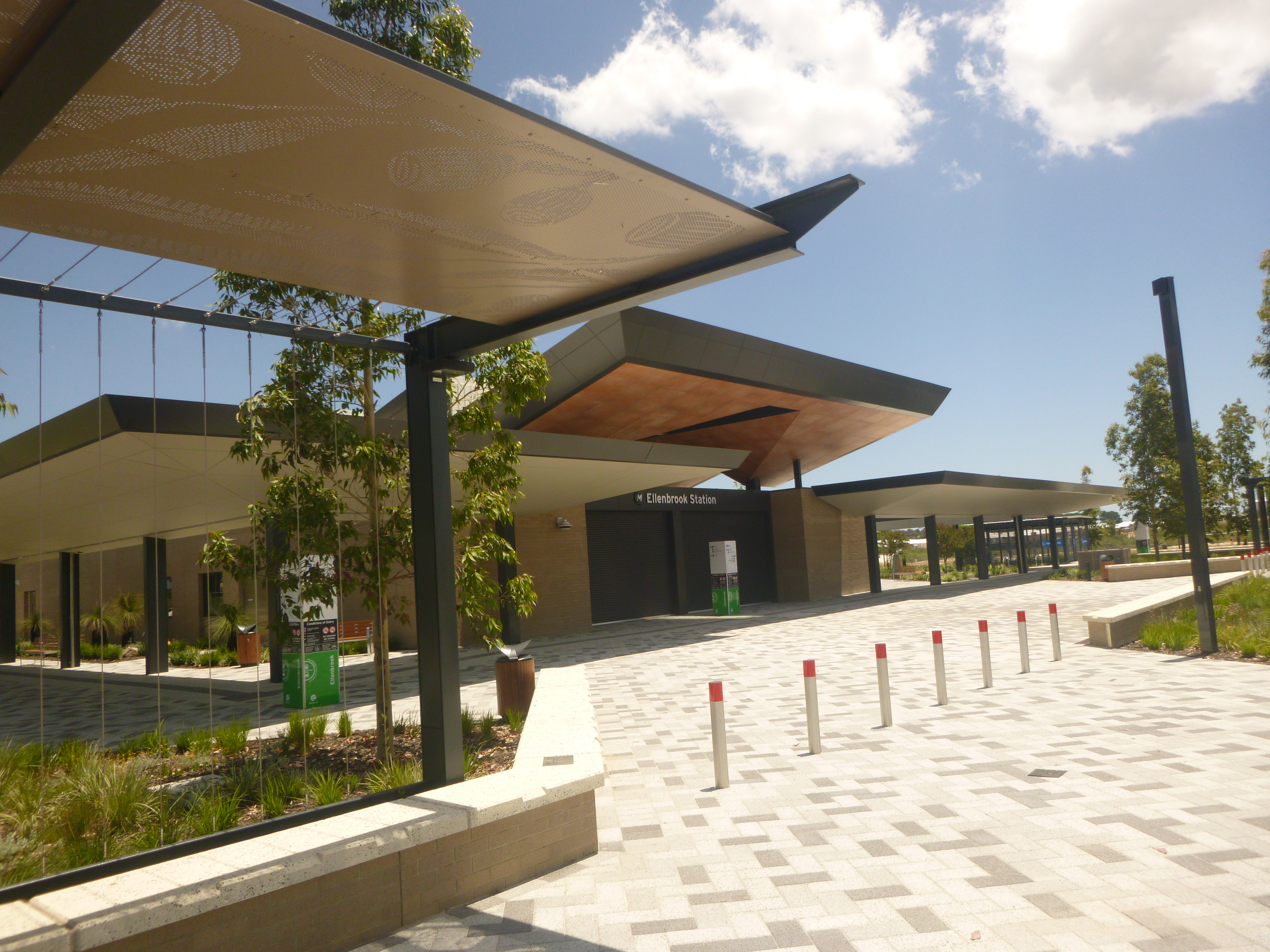
Ellenbrook Station on The Parkway

Ellenbrook has close proximity to Perth's freeway and state route network, with Tonkin Highway (State Route 4) running north–south along its western edge with two interchanges. It connects Ellenbrook to Morley, Perth Airport and Armadale to the south, as well as Great Northern Highway into the Mid-West region. Gnangara Road (State Route 84) in the south of Ellenbrook is the primary east-west highway linking the area to Joondalup and the coast.

Local highways The Promenade, The Broadway and Henley Brook Avenue are classified as District Distributor B roads by Main Roads Western Australia - all are 4-lane dual carriageways. Other important intra-suburban roads include Banrock Drive, Pinaster Parade and Drumpellier Drive, which are all classified as lesser Local Distributors.

Ellenbrook Station is the final stop on the Ellenbrook railway line from Perth, with its terminus station located in the town centre. The railway line runs at-grade through the town centre and the village of The Bridges, before joining up with and running alongside Drumpellier Drive as it leaves the suburb. A journey to Perth CBD by train from Ellenbrook takes 31 minutes. The station acts as a public transport hub for the wider urban area, providing a network of feeder bus routes to surrounding suburbs:

- 340 Ellenbrook Station to Ellenbrook (Annie's Landing) – via The Broadway and Banrock Av.
- 341 Ellenbrook Station to Ellenbrook (Malvern Springs) – via Brookmount Dr and Farmaner Pky.
- 342 Ellenbrook Station to Ellenbrook (Malvern Springs) – via Westgrove Dr.
- 343 Ellenbrook Station to Aveley Secondary College - via Holdsworth Av and Cashman Av.
- 345 Ellenbrook Station to Bullsbrook Town Centre - via Millhouse Rd and Great Northern Hwy.
- 346 Ellenbrook Station to Aveley - via Flecker Prm and Hancock Av.
- 347 Whiteman Park Station to Ellenbrook Station - via Partridge St and Woodlake Bvd.
- 348 Ellenbrook Station to Henley Brook - via Amethyst Pky and Henley Brook Av.
- 349 Whiteman Park Station to Ellenbrook Station - via Woollcott Av, West Swan Rd and Gnangara Rd.
- 455 Ellenbrook Station to Whitfords Station – serves Main Street and Pinaster Parade.
