= Henley Brook, Western Australia =

Henley Brook
- Suburb
- Interactive map of Henley Brook
- Coordinates: 31.812°S 115.987°E
- Country: Australia
- State: Western Australia
- City: Perth
- LGA: City of Swan

Government
  - State electorate: West Swan
  - Federal division: Hasluck

Area
  - Total: 7.3 km^{2} (2.8 sq mi)

Population
  - Total: 2,500 (SAL 2021)
- Postcode: 6055
Suburbs around Henley Brook
Ellenbrook	Aveley	Belhus
Whiteman	Henley Brook	Millendon
Brabham	West Swan	Herne Hill

Henley Brook is an outer suburb of Perth, Western Australia, located in Perth's Swan Valley region. It is 25 kilometres (16 mi) north-east of Perth's central business district in the City of Swan local government area.

Henley Brook is notable for its local history and landmarks, dating back to the foundation of the Swan River Colony. The eastern side of the locality near the Swan River is rural-residential, with many wineries, hobby farms and tourist attractions situated along West Swan Road, while the western side is dense suburban residential, forming part of the wider urban area of nearby Ellenbrook.

== History ==
=== Name ===
The name Henley Brook is taken from the waterway of the same name that passes through the area. The brook in turn is named after Henley Park, a name given to the area by James Stirling on his 1827 expedition of the Swan River. Henley Park was originally the name of an estate in Surrey, England, belonging to one of Stirling's relatives.

=== Colonial era ===
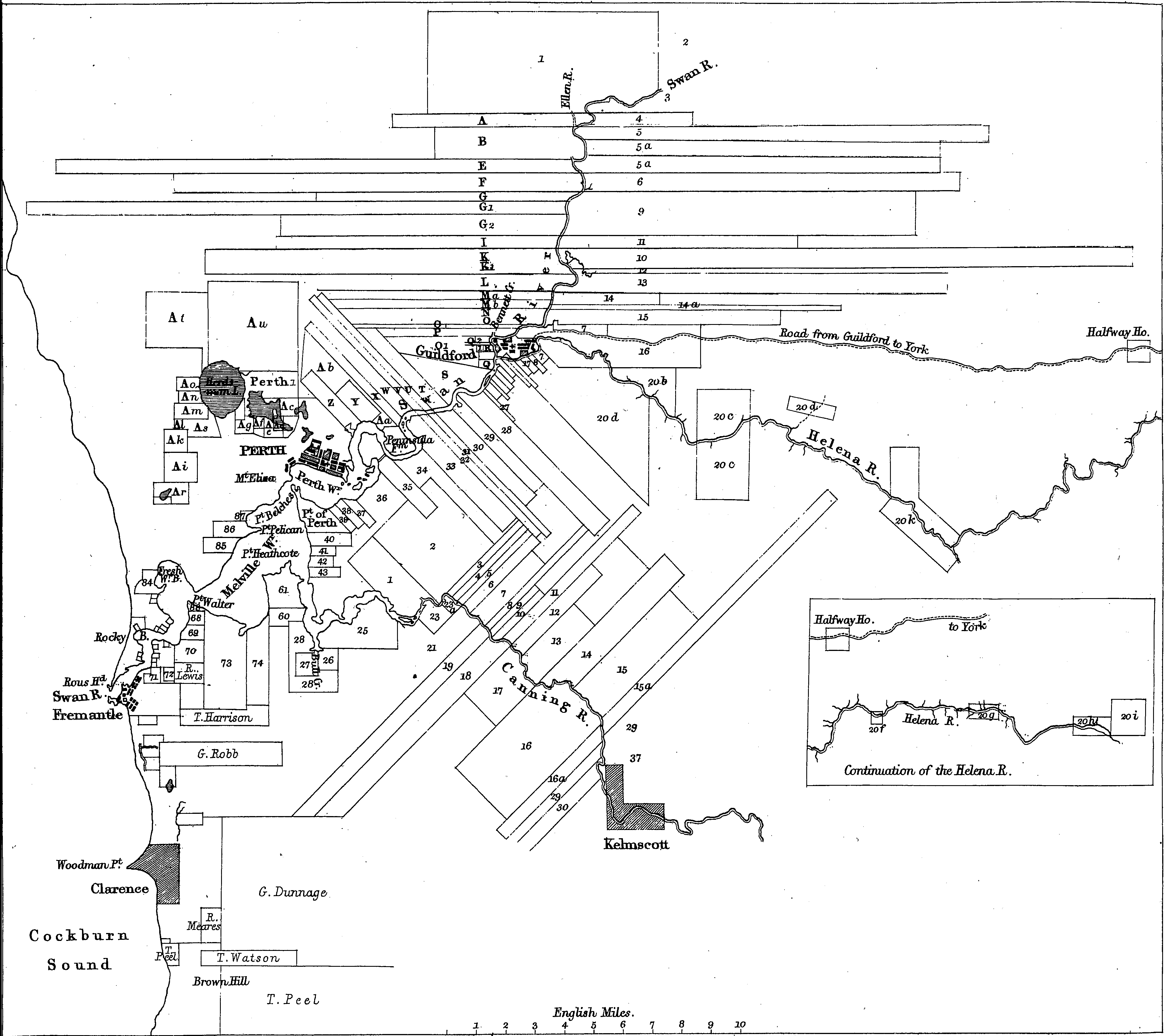
The "Arrowsmith map" of 1839, showing the boundaries of Swan Locations B, E and F

During the 1801 Baudin expedition to Australia, French explorers from the Naturaliste charted a six day expedition up the Swan River on longboats, reaching the Henley Brook area and documenting its flora, fauna and environment before turning back. Later in 1827, after hearing of the French reports of the area, British naval officer Captain James Stirling led a party from the HMS Success on a similar expedition up the Swan River to survey the area for colonisation potential. Like the French, they stopped and camped in the Henley Brook area before turning back.

Stirling returned to Australia in 1829 with a mandate to establish the Swan River Colony and its system of settler land grants. The Henley Brook area comprised three grants, known as Swan Locations B, E and F, all used for pastoral agriculture and wheatgrowing. Location B was an estate named Henley Park that was granted to William Mackie, and later part-owned with his cousin, Frederick Irwin. Mackie and Irwin later donated part of their estate, at the point where Stirling first landed, for public use as a church. Under Edwards' supervision, the Upper Swan Church was built on the land in 1831. Mackie himself was buried at this church upon his death in 1860, as were many other prominent land-owners and labourers from the area.

Bricklayer Richard Edwards lived on the adjoining Swan Location E, an estate granted to Lionel Samson, which allowed him to also work at Henley Park as Mackie's farm manager, where he built Mackie's homestead. Edwards also did work on other grants, such as Henry Bull's homestead at Belhus. Edwards was later gifted half of Location E by Samson; Edwards named his new estate Clearwell.

Location F, granted to William Smithers, became subdivided very early on, with small lots being purchased by labourers working in the area. A small cluster of homesteads on these lots formed an area colloquially known as Albion Town. William Haddrill's house, which stands today, was a part of Albion Town.

=== Suburban era ===
After passing through several prominent owners, including Edmund Brockman and Henry Saunders, the Henley Park estate was put up for subdivision in 1922, featuring large lots of between 5 and 10 acres (2 and 4 ha). This allowed aspiring hobby farmers to move into the area and encouraged the rise of viticulture operations in the Swan Valley.

The modern suburb of Henley Brook, covering all of the former Henley Park, Clearwell and Albion Town estates, was first gazetted by the Shire of Swan in 1972. The western side was then subdivided into similar rural 5-acre (2 ha) lots in 1983. This area was encouraged by the state government for equestrian use with bridle paths between Whiteman Park & the Swan Valley. It was also used to compensate horse breeders and stud owners who were displaced from Newburn.

In the 1995 Swan Valley Planning Act, the eastern side was selected for conservation and preservation activity as part of the Swan Valley tourism and industry corridor - leaving the western side free for urban development.

The first suburban neighbourhood development in Henley Brook was the Morgan Fields estate, on land which had been purchased by the State Housing Commission in the 1980s. It was subdivided and released for sale in 2000 as part of the Ellenbrook Joint Venture.

In 2011, the developing urban area in the south-west was excised from Henley Brook and created as its own suburb named Brabham.

The Henley Brook Local Structure Plan was approved by the WAPC in 2021, allowing the first west-side developments began to occur the next year, with the first stages of Brooklands Private Estate and Henley Brook by Mirvac being released for sale.

== Neighbourhood ==
The following suburban estates exist in the western side of Henley Brook, where the area is classified as part of the Swan Urban Growth Corridor:

Neighbourhood	Developer
Morgan Fields	Ellenbrook Joint Venture
La Valle Private Estate	LandGroupWA
Henley Brook by Mirvac	Mirvac
Brooklands Private Estate	Little Property Group
St. Clare Estate	Abel Property
Ariella Private Estate	Cedar Woods
Starflower at Henley Brook	Weston Property Group

The eastern side is characterised by rural-residential hobby farms and viticultural estates, mostly on large lots of between 5 and 10 acres.

== Demographics ==
At the 2021 Australian census, Henley Brook had a population of 2,500. 50.2% of Henley Brook residents were male and 49.8% were female. Belhus's median age was 41, slightly higher than the state and national average of 38. The most common ancestries in Belhus as of 2021 were English (43.2%), Australian (35.5%), Irish (9.3%), Scottish (8.7%) and Italian (8.2%), with 2.8% of residents identifying as Aboriginal and/or Torres Strait Islander. 72.5% of residents were born in Australia.

== Geography ==
The suburb is bounded by the Swan River to the east, and Drumpellier Drive & Whiteman Park to the west. Gnangara Road in the north separates Henley Brook from Aveley and Ellenbrook. Park Street, Murray Road and Woolcott Avenue comprise the southern boundary. Woolcott Avenue was originally the entire boundary until the creation of Brabham in 2011.

Henley Brook is situated on the flood plains of the Swan River, with regularly occurring seasonal floods. Two ephemeral streams from the river - Henley Brook and St. Leonard's Creek - traverse the suburb. Henley Brook is in the north-east near Brockman Street, while St Leonards Creek traverses the centre of the locality in a north-westerly direction. Topographically, the north-western area is situated high up on the Gnangara Mound, reaching peaks of 45 metres above sea level, but this drops to only 7 metres in the flood plains of the western side.

== Facilities and services ==
Western Power's Henley Brook substation was built in the north-west corner of the locality, abutting Ellenbrook. The substation serves power to most of Henley Brook, as well as the whole of the Ellenbrook urban area, including The Vines to the north-east and Brabham to the south. The substation supplies power from Pinjar Power Station. A portion of the rural eastern side of Henley Brook is served by the Beechboro substation.

A small commercial zone exists in the north of the suburb on Gnangara Road with two fast food restaurants and a service station. Ellenbrook fire station is also located here, serving the wider Ellenbrook area.

The suburb relies on the nearby town centres of Ellenbrook and Brabham for main line retail and most civic services.

=== Education ===
There is one state primary school, Henley Brook Primary School that serves the whole suburb. High school students fall into the catchment area of Ellenbrook Secondary College.

A campus of the private Australian Islamic College, serving kindergarten to year 12, was opened in 2024.

== Industry ==
The Public Transport Authority is building an electric bus depot on the site of the former Henley Brook bus station.

== Amenities and attractions ==
The following historical heritage buildings from the colonial era are all still extant in Henley Brook:

- All Saints Anglican Church
- Haddrill's House
- Edwards' House
- Henley Park Homestead

In addition to the historical attractions, Henley Brook contains a wide range of cafes, pubs, restaurants, breweries, vineyards and hotels, mostly situated along West Swan Road. These venues are all popular hotspots for tourism, weddings and other events, in line with other areas of the Swan Valley region.

The area also features the following unique tourist attractions:

- West Australian Reptile Park
- Swan Valley Cuddly Animal Farm
- Paintball Skirmish
- Swan Valley Hotel, featuring Supa Golf and Supa Putt

== Transport ==
The suburb is generally bounded in a square-shape by three main roads - West Swan Road and Drumpellier Drive running north to south, and Gnangara Road running east to west. Drumpellier Drive links to Ellenbrook and Reid Highway, while Gnangara Road links to Tonkin Highway. Park Street is classified as a local distributor road.

Ellenbrook station is the closest railway station and public transport hub, but Whiteman Park station is also close by to the south. The Ellenbrook railway line runs along Henley Brook's western boundary.

=== Bus Routes ===
- 347 Ellenbrook station to Whiteman Park station – serves Starflower Road and Park Street
- 348 Ellenbrook station to Australian Islamic College (Henley Brook) – serves Henley Brook Avenue and Lesmurdie Place
- 349 Ellenbrook station to Whiteman Park station – serves Gnangara Road, West Swan Road and Woollcott Avenue
- 359 Midland station to Whiteman Park station – serves Woollcott Avenue
