= Brabham, Western Australia =

Coordinates: 31°49′37″S 115°58′29″E

Brabham
- Suburb
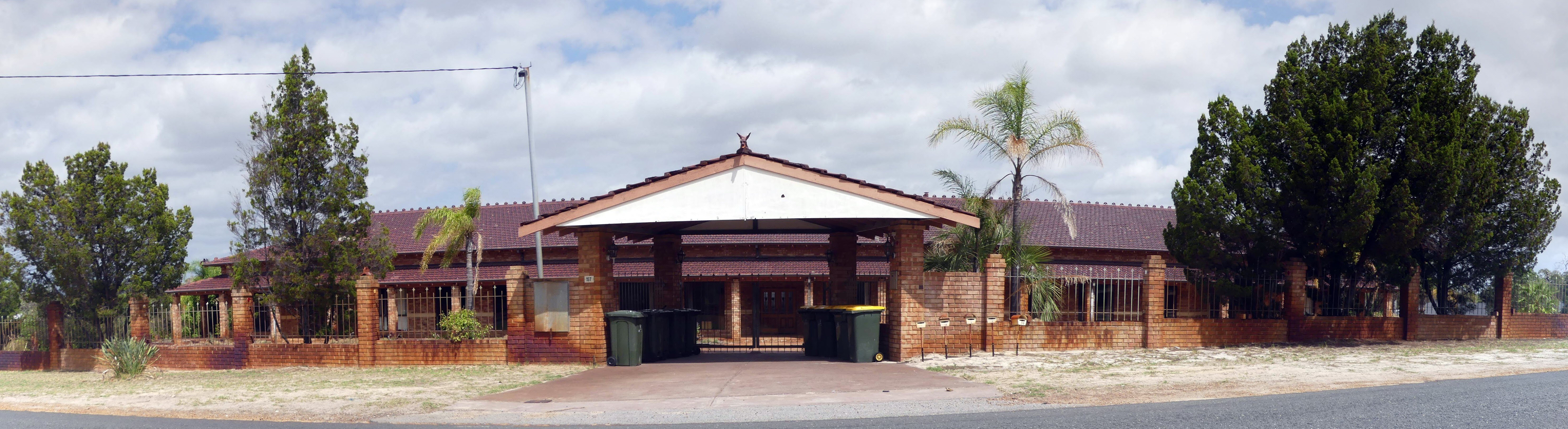
- Shalom House, located in Brabham
- Interactive map of Brabham
- Country: Australia
- State: Western Australia
- City: Perth
- LGA: City of Swan
- Established: 2011

Government
  - State electorate: Swan Hills
  - Federal division: Hasluck

Population
  - Total: 8,665 (SAL 2021)
- Postcode: 6055
Suburbs around Brabham
Whiteman	Henley Brook	Henley Brook
Whiteman	Brabham	West Swan
Bennett Springs	Dayton	West Swan

Brabham is a suburb located about 21 km (13 mi) north-east of Perth's central business district. The suburb is located in the City of Swan just south of Henley Brook, formerly being a part of that suburb before it was gazetted in May 2011. The suburb was named after Australian motor racing personality Sir Jack Brabham who competed in the 1962 Australian Grand Prix, held at the nearby Caversham Airfield. The suburb is part of the City of Swan's urban growth corridor and is bordered by Park Street to the north, Murray Street to the east, Harrow Street to the south and Drumpellier Drive and Isoondon Street to the west. It is located in the Whiteman Ward of the City of Swan.

== Caversham Airfield ==
Caversham Airfield was constructed by the US military to be used as a base for bomber aircraft during the later stages of World War II. Following the war, the strip was no longer required for aircraft and so it was converted into a racing track, hosting the Australian Grand Prix twice, in 1957 and 1962. In 1969, all WA circuit racing was moved to the newly opened Wanneroo Park Raceway and so the federal government developed the facility into a radio communications hub. The airfield will soon be the site of future housing development by DevelopmentWA in partnership with developer Peet.

== City of Swan - Whiteman Ward ==
As part of the 2017 City of Swan Boundary review the suburb of Brabham was relocated from the Swan Valley/Gidgegannup Ward into the renamed Whiteman Ward (formerly known as the Ballajura Ward).

The current councillors for the area are:

- Bryce Parry
- Mel Congerton
- John McNamara
- Jacob Hamilton

== Development ==
Development of the suburb commenced in 2011 at the Whiteman Edge estate by Stockland. Other estates include:

- Whiteman Edge by Stockland
- Ariella Private Estate by Cedar Woods
- Avonlee Private Estate by TerraNovis
- Flamewood Private Estate by Parcel Property
- Brabham by Peet.

The Brabham town centre located on Everglades Avenue is newly established and features a Coles supermarket, 12 speciality retailers, a medical centre and childcare facilities but future development is to be expected.

== Education facilities ==
Brabham has access to a wide range of primary and secondary schools, both public and private.

Primary schools include:

- Brabham Primary School
- Ellenbrook Independent Primary School
- St Helena’s Catholic Primary School
- Dayton Primary School
- Caversham Primary School

Secondary schools include:

- Ellenbrook Secondary College
- Swan Valley Anglican Community School
- Ellenbrook Christian College
