= Ellenbrook Secondary College =

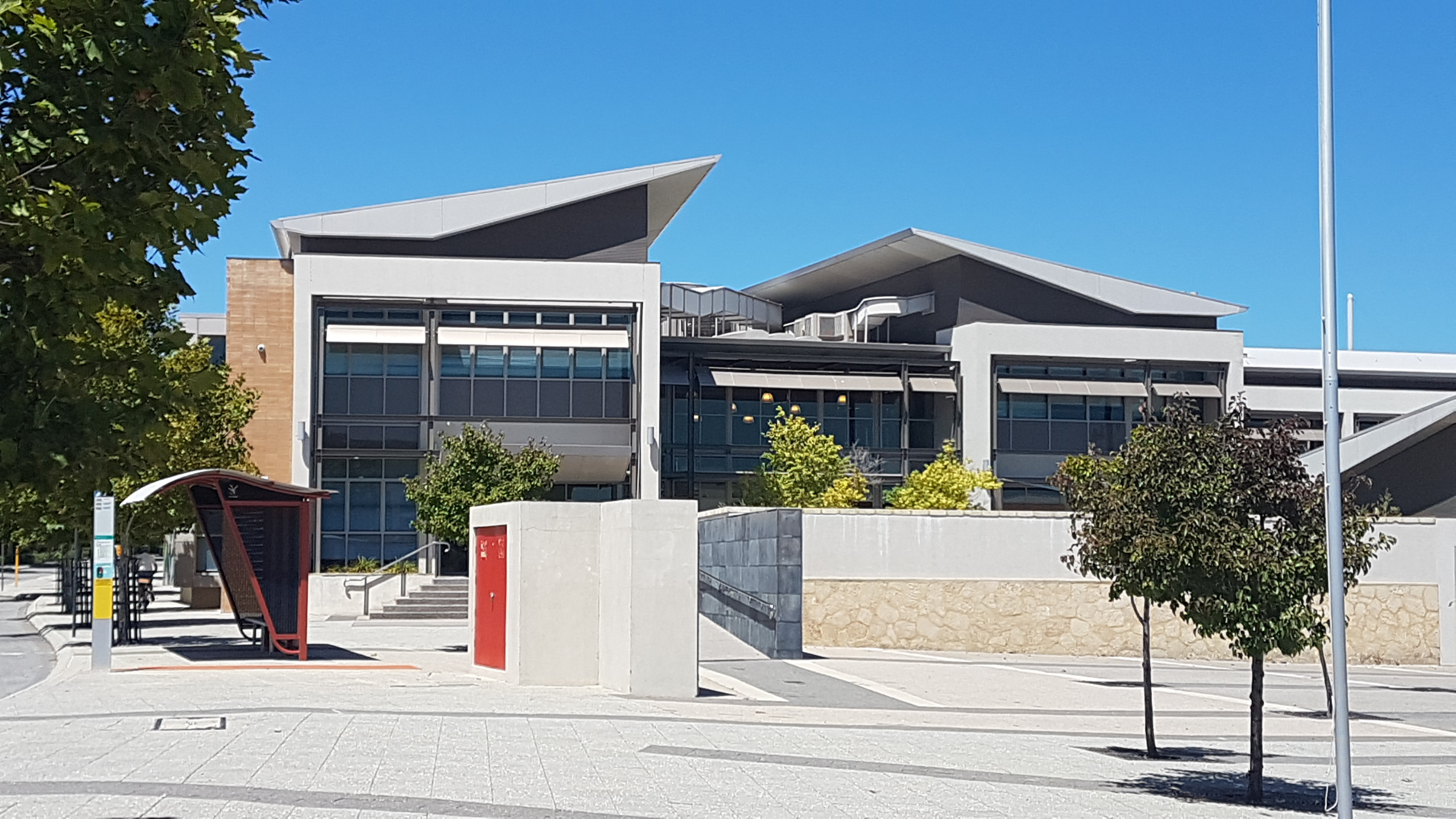

Location
- 100 Main Street; Ellenbrook, Western Australia; Australia; 31°47′06″S 115°57′54″E

Information
- Type: Independent public co-educational day school
- Opened: 2007; 19 years ago
- Educational authority: WA Department of Education
- Specialist: Football; Netball; Gifted and Talented Academic (from 2021)
- Principal: Peter Havel
- Years: 7–12
- Enrolment: 1,229 (2023)
- Campus type: Suburban
- Colours: Navy blue and yellow
- Website: ellenbrooksc.wa.edu.au

Ellenbrook Secondary College (abbreviated as ESC) is an Independent public co-educational high day school, located in the Perth suburb of Ellenbrook.

== Overview ==
Ellenbrook Secondary College was established in 2007 in the fast growing suburb of Ellenbrook. It is built in the Ellenbrook town centre. It achieved Independent Public School status in 2015.

== Programs ==
Ellenbrook Secondary College has a Department of Education approved specialist program for instrumental music and voice as well as an Education Support Centre Program for Students with Special Needs and a Gifted and Talented Academic Program, being one of 24 public schools in Western Australia to have one.

Ellenbrook Secondary College also offers school based programs in STEM, Football and Netball.

== Local intake area ==
Ellenbrook Secondary College's local intake area covers part of Aveley, part of Belhus, part of Brabham, part of Ellenbrook, Henley Brook and a small part of Whiteman. Students living in the local intake area have a guaranteed place at the school if they apply. Students living outside the local intake area can apply as well, but they will be accepted on a case-by-case basis.

== Academic results ==
Year	Rank	Median ATAR	Eligible students	Students with ATAR	% Students with ATAR	Ref
2021	—N/a	66.40	232	46	19.83%	
2020	119	66.25	218	42	19.27%	
2019	112	71.20	185	43	23.24%	
2018	98	75.85	224	46	20.54%	
2017	76	79.10	162	22	13.58%	
2016	105	72.35	173	55	31.79%	

== Student numbers ==
Year	Number
2014	1,386
2015	1,523
2016	1,567
2017	1,665
2018	1,643
2019	1,497
2020	1,444
2021	1,339
2022	1,282
2023	1,229

== See also ==
- List of schools in the Perth metropolitan area
