= Miriam Stannage =

Australian artist (1939–2016)

- Born: 1939; Northam, Western Australia, Australia
- Died: 2016 (aged 76–77); Perth, Western Australia, Australia
- Known for: Painting, printmaking, photography
- Spouse: Tom Gibbons

Miriam Stannage (1939–2016) was an Australian conceptual artist. She was known for her work in painting, printmaking and photography, and participated in many group and solo exhibitions, receiving several awards over her career. Her work was also featured in two Biennales and two major retrospective exhibitions.

== Biography ==
Miriam Stannage was born in 1939 in Northam, Western Australia to Helen and James Stannage. Her younger brother was the historian Tom Stannage (1944–2012). In 1943, Stannage and her parents moved to Perth where Stannage was based for most of her life and began her career as a self-trained artist.

At age 15, she left school to undertake a secretarial job and, later, trained in nursing. In 1962 and 1963, Stannage travelled extensively, visiting Europe, the US and Canada. Upon her return, she began taking art classes at the University of Western Australia (UWA), where she studied under William Boissevain, and later with Henry Froudist in 1965. That same year Stannage opened her own art gallery, Rhode Gallery, in Perth, where she worked and exhibited for two years. Within this time, she became a Secretary of the Western Australian Contemporary Art Society, and after her first solo exhibitions in Perth, Miriam began teaching in 1971 with the Education Department of Western Australia.

In 1980, Stannage married fellow artist and UWA lecturer Tom Gibbons, and the two shared a 30-year partnership in which they worked together to support the creative culture in Perth.

In July 2016, a monograph of Stannage's life and work was published. Shortly after, on 11 September, Stannage died.

== Career ==
Throughout her almost 50-year career, Stannage produced a varied and eclectic body of work, encompassing collage, photography, print-making, and text-based works. Stannage first rose to prominence through the 1982 Sydney Biennale and the 1992 Adelaide Biennale, as well as her solo shows at the Art Gallery of Western Australia. She was awarded an honorary doctorate from Curtin University, as well as being declared a ‘State Living Treasure’ in Western Australia. Over the course of her career, Stannage received several awards including the Albany Art Prize, the Georges Invitation Art Prize for drawing and the Power Institute residency at Cité Internationale des Arts in Paris. Seven of Stannage's works have been featured in the Cruthers Collection of Women's Art.

Stannage favoured simple structure and minimal use of form in her works, opting instead for text and collaged tableaux. She has been described as having ‘minimalist sensibilities.’

Her subject matter was engaged with contemporary events and news reportage, often utilising and subverting the visual language of newspapers and magazines. While her body of work is extensive, Stannage's works always maintained their collage aesthetic, and were always founded upon her ongoing exploration of existential themes such as mortality, the spiritual and a quest for the meaning of life. Her work often centres the uncomfortable and emotive, in particular the heightened emotional impacts of conflict, destruction and disasters.

In 2001, following the September 11 attacks, Stannage shifted her focus strictly to the event, making works which spoke to the random nature of terrorist attacks and the interplay of monotony and death. In response to the attacks, she produced a collection of postage stamps which centred on concepts of stilled time, such as a clockface frozen at the moment of impact.

At the time of her death in 2016, Stannage's works were held in various state and national collections, including the Australian National Gallery in Canberra and the Art Gallery of Western Australia.

== Selected exhibitions ==
- 1969

Miriam Stannage: Solo, Old Fire Station Gallery, Perth, Western Australia.

Bunbury Art Prize, City of Bunbury, Western Australia.

- 1970

Albany Art Prize, Albany, Western Australia.

- 1974

Miriam Stannage: Solo, Hogarth Galleries, Sydney.

Boxes (Group Exhibition), Ewing Gallery, Melbourne.

- 1975

Grid Show, Ewing Gallery, University of Melbourne.

Art and the Creative Woman, Royal Society of Arts, Adelaide.

‘It’s Great to be an Australian Woman?’, Hogarth Galleries, Sydney.

- 1977

Annual Exhibition, Printmakers Association of WA, Undercroft Gallery, Perth.

- 1978

Ten Western Australian Print-Makers (Group Exhibition), Art Gallery of Western Australia, Perth.

- 1981

Miriam Stannage, Quentin Gallery, Perth.

- 1989

Perception: Miriam Stannage, Australian Centre for Contemporary Art, Melbourne.

- 2006

Sensations: Miriam Stannage, John Curtin Gallery, Perth.

- 2016

Miriam Stannage: Survey 2006–2016, University of Western Australia's Lawrence Wilson Art Gallery, Perth.
