= Ellenbrook Christian College =

Location
- Ellenbrook, Western Australia; Australia; 31°47′13″S 115°57′34″E

Information
- Type: Independent, coeducational, non-denominational Christian day school
- Motto: Wisdom is of God
- Established: 2001
- Principal: Michelle Schouten
- Years offered: Pre K–12
- Enrolment: ~827
- Houses: Flynn, Garlett, King, Nightingale
- Website: www.ellenbrook.wa.edu.au

Ellenbrook Christian College is a Christian non-denominational, co-educational school catering for students from pre-kindergarten to Year 12. Commencing in 2001, the College was built in the satellite town of Ellenbrook in the north-eastern suburbs of Perth, Western Australia. The College is a member of the Swan Christian Education Association Inc.

== History ==
The College opened for students in 2001 with Jack Joyce as inaugural Principal and Doreen Smith as inaugural College Council Chair. In that first year, the College consisted of 13 staff and 151 students by year's end. In 2020 Mike Pitman took the role of principal, soon leaving it after retirement. The current principal, as of the start of 2025, is Michelle Schouten.

== Campus ==
The College is built on one campus located at 5 Santona Boulevard in Ellenbrook, Western Australia. The Junior School library and technology centre and the Secondary gymnasium, auditorium and performing arts buildings are the most recently constructed additions to the campus. They were completed in 2011 with financial assistance from the Australian Government's Building the Education Revolution.

=== Ellenbrook railway line ===
In 2021, the Ellenbrook railway line began construction. The railway line's alignment goes through Ellenbrook Christian College, between the buildings and the oval. The railway was built on an embankment, with a pedestrian underpass allowing access between the buildings and oval. The land was reserved for the railway since the 1990s, with the school purchasing the land with the knowledge that the railway would eventually be built.

== Curriculum ==
In Years K–10, the curriculum is derived from a combination of the Western Australian and the incoming Australian Curriculum, which will eventually supersede the Curriculum Framework. In the upper school years (Year 11 & 12), students study for a Western Australian Certificate of Education as managed by the School Curriculum and Standards Authority.

== Extra curricular activities ==
- Bush Ranger Cadets (years 8 to 12)
- DEC River Rangers (year 7)
- Golf Academy (years 7 to 12) - Currently unavailable

== See also ==
- List of schools in the Perth metropolitan area
