= Swan Valley Anglican Community School =

Independent school in Aveley, Western Australia

Coordinates: 31°47′38″S 115°59′10″E

- Aveley, Western Australia; Australia

Information
- Type: Independent
- Motto: Walk in the Truth
- Established: 2006
- Principal: Melissa Powell
- Enrolment: Over 1400 students
- Website: www.svacs.wa.edu.au

Swan Valley Anglican Community School is a co-educational, Pre-Kindergarten to Year 12, day school located in Perth, Western Australia. The school, located in Perth's north-eastern suburb of Aveley, in the Swan Valley, was opened in 2006.

The school has more than 1400 students.

In 2007, the ABC program Gardening Australia reported on the school's context in the Swan Valley:

The Swan Valley, north east of Perth, is a productive area with orchards and vineyards. But as the suburbs expand, houses, shops and schools are also part of the landscape. The Swan Valley Anglican Community School has plans to make its own grounds productive once again.

Swan Valley Anglican Community School is a school of the Anglican Schools Commission. Its school publication is known as The Vine.
