= Australian Islamic College =

School in Western Australia

Location
- Perth, Western Australia and Adelaide, South Australia; 31.9806°S 115.9327°E

Information
- Type: Independent co-educational primary and secondary day school
- Denomination: Islamic
- Established: 1986; 40 years ago
- Founder: Abdallah Saad Magar
- Principal: Abdullah Khan
- Staff: 600 (30 December 2025)
- Years: K–12
- Enrolment: 6,000 (30 December 2025)
- Campuses: South Australia; West Croydon (K–12); Western Australia; Dianella (K–6); Forrestdale; Henley Brook; Kewdale (K–12); Thornlie (K–10)
- Website: aic.wa.edu.au
- Campus locations: Dianella: 31.9023°S 115.8743°E; Forrestdale: 32.169436°S 115.924019°E; Henley Brook: 31.804933°S 115.978914°E; Kewdale: 31.9806°S 115.9327°E; Thornlie: 32.0542°S 115.9615°E; West Croydon: 34.8921°S 138.564°E

Australian Islamic College is an independent, co-educational, primary and secondary school and tertiary college located in Perth, Western Australia, and Adelaide, South Australia. The school was founded in 1986 by Abdallah (Note: Also spelt Abdullah.) Saad Magar, with 49 students and three staff. As of 30 December 2025, the school has 6,000 students and 600 staff spread across six campuses, five in the Perth suburbs of Dianella, Forrestdale, Henley Brook, Kewdale and Thornlie, and one in the Adelaide suburb of West Croydon.

== History ==
The school was established in 1986 as the Muslim Community School at Brisbane Street in Perth. In 1990 a second campus was opened in Thornlie to cater for students from grades K-10, and in 1996 a third campus was opened in the northern suburb of Dianella. In 2000 Kewdale was opened on the grounds of the former Kewdale Senior High School, which had amalgamated with Belmont Senior High School to reopen as Belmont City College. On 22 June 2017, the West Croydon campus was opened on the site of the former Islamic College of South Australia in the Adelaide suburb of West Croydon.

== Controversies ==
In 2007, Australian Islamic College was raided by 28 fraud squad officers and ten investigators from the Department of Education, Science and Training investigations unit. Abdallah Saad Magar and the Principal Aziz Magdi were charged with fraud offences against the governments of Australia and Western Australia. The charges related to falsifying records to indicate that more students were attending the school than actually were and thereby obtaining money for the school to which they were not entitled. The amount that was alleged to have been obtained fraudulently was A$3.16 million, equivalent to A$4.58 million in 2022. Both were found guilty in the District Court on 31 March 2010. Abdallah Saad Magar appealed the conviction to the Supreme Court, however his application was denied.

== Notable alumna ==
- Fatima Payman

== See also ==
- Education in Australia
- List of schools in the Perth metropolitan area
- Islam in Australia

== Sources ==
- Aijazi, Sana (10 April 2026). "Tribute: in Loving Memory of Haji Abdallah Magar". Australasian Muslim Times.
- "About AIC". Australian Islamic College. 2025. "The Australian Islamic College, originally named Muslim Community School, opened its doors on Brisbane Street, Perth."
- Lot 15 (No.651) Nicholson Road, Forrestdale - Approved Educational Establishment and Place of Worship – DAP/21/02046 (PDF) (Report). 1. Government of Western Australia. 2025.
- Ho, Cason; Mitsopoulos, Nadia; Patidar, Som (15 June 2026). "Perth Girl Hania Ahmed Remembered After Fatal Police Shooting in Pakistan". ABC News.
- Grattan, Michelle (5 July 2024). "Labor's Fatima Payman defects to crossbench as government worries about Muslim vote". ABC News.
- Hunter, Lindsay; Morling, Loreley A. (2016). Town of Victoria Park Local History Collection Timeline (3rd ed.). Town of Victoria Park Library.
- Khan, Abdullah (30 December 2025). "Executive Principal's Message" (PDF). Newsletter – Thornlie Campus. No. Term 4. Australian Islamic College. pp. 3–4.
- Scott, Leisa; Rousset, Olivia; Powell, Robyn (19 August 2024). "Former Labor senator Fatima Payman defied her own party and crossed the floor. Her husband's career was collateral damage". ABC News.
