= Tom Stannage =

Western Australian historian, academic, and Australian rules football player

- Born: Charles Thomas Stannage; 14 March 1944; Subiaco, Western Australia
- Died: 4 October 2012 (aged 68); Nedlands, Western Australia
- Education: Midland Junction High School, Perth Modern School, University of Western Australia, Cambridge University
- Occupations: Professor of history, Australian Historian
- Years active: 1971–2012
- Spouse(s): Maria Stannage, née Fillanich
- Parent(s): Rev James Eakins-Stannage; Helen Eakins-Stannage, née Masters
- Relatives: Miriam Stannage (sister)

Charles Thomas Stannage, AM (14 March 1944 – 4 October 2012) was a prominent Western Australian historian, academic, and Australian rules football player. He edited the major work A New History of Western Australia, which was published in 1981.

Stannage held a professorship in history at the University of Western Australia (UWA) and was executive dean of humanities at Curtin University.

== Biography ==
=== Early life ===
Tom Stannage was born in Subiaco, Western Australia, on 14 March 1944. His mother, Helen Eakins-Stannage (née Helen Russel Masters) was originally from Northam and his father James Eakins-Stannage was an Anglican cleric born in the United Kingdom.

He grew up in the Perth suburbs of Subiaco and Bassendean and attended Midland Junction High School and Perth Modern School, before studying history at the University of Western Australia (UWA).

He married fellow UWA student Maria Fillanich. They lived in England from 1967 as Stannage completed a doctorate at Cambridge University. Maria Stannage later taught English and Literature at St Mary's Anglican Girls' School.

=== Football career ===
During the early 1960s, Stannage played Australian rules football in the Western Australian National Football League (WANFL). He was a left-footed wingman whose small frame did not stop him taking spectacular marks. Stannage showed skills with Swan Districts and former Swans coach John Todd said, "he would have been one of the game's greats had he not chosen academia."

His biggest game was the 1965 WANFL Grand Final when he kicked two goals. Commentator Dennis Cometti said, "the Swans led by 21 after three-quarters, but East Fremantle surged to win." That year he made his debut for Western Australia and he was fifth in the Sandover Medal count. His career included interstate games and he played against Victoria. At 22, he left football to continue his studies having played 54 games for Swan Districts between 1964 and 1967.

Stannage was a member of the West Australian Football League (WAFL) board of directors in 1986, when it was announced that the West Coast Eagles would join the Victorian Football League (later the Australian Football League). Stannage took on the role chairman of selectors during the Eagles' first season. His son Chris was president of Swan Districts between 1996 and 1999, and the two worked closely together.

=== Academic career and later life ===
Stannage returned to Perth in 1971 to take up a position lecturing in history at UWA and was later appointed professor of history there.

As the sesquicentennial of Western Australia approached, Stannage was asked to undertake two major works. Perth City Council commissioned a history of the city: The People of Perth: A Social History of WA's Capital City (1979). UWA Press asked Stannage to edit A New History of Western Australia (1981), an 836-page reference work. These acclaimed works and others by Stannage wove together the strands of Aboriginal experience into white settlement and he formulated ways for Western Australian history to be simplified and taught in schools.

In 1991, Stannage was foundation chairman of the Heritage Council of Western Australia.

He was made a Member of the Order of Australia, for services to the study of history and museum development, in the 1997 Australia Day Honours. That same year he won the inaugural Prime Minister's Award for Australian University Teacher of the Year.

Stannage was appointed a professor and executive dean, Division of Humanities at Curtin University, Perth, in 1999.

He was one of the recipients of the Centenary Medal, awarded only in 2001, the centenary year of the federation of Australia, to people who had "made a contribution to Australian society or government".

As a prominent Australian historian, Stannage was invited by federal Minister for Education, Julie Bishop to attend the Australian History Summit, 2006. That same year he was on a panel of five to select The West Australian's 100 most influential people in WA.

Stannage died in Perth on 4 October 2012 at Sir Charles Gairdner Hospital. He was in a coma after suffering a heart attack eight days earlier. He had two children with his wife. Chris, a lawyer, and Katie, an orthopaedic surgeon.

His older sister, Miriam Stannage (1939–2016), was a prominent artist.

== Publications ==
- The People of Perth: a Social History of Western Australia's Capital City (1979)
- Handbook for Aboriginal and Islander History (co-editor, 1979 and 1998)
- Baldwin Thwarts the Opposition: The British General Election of 1935 (1980)
- C. T. Stannage, ed. (1 December 1981). A New History of Western Australia. Nedlands: UWA Publishing. ISBN 0-85564-181-9. LCCN 82101009. OCLC 963830667. OL 3517729M. Wikidata Q125995168.
- Western Australia's Heritage: the Pioneer Myth (1985)
- Embellishing the Landscape: the Images of Amy Heap and Fred Flood, 1920–1940 (1990)
- Images of Women: Women and Museums in Australia (co-convenor and co-editor, 1994)
- Principal Australian Historic Themes, a Report Commissioned by the Australian Heritage Commission (co-author, 1993–94)
- Sir Paul Hasluck in Australian History (co-editor, 1998)
- Lakeside City: the Dreaming Of Joondalup (1996)
- Gold and civilisation – with Art Exhibitions Australia & National Museum of Australia (editor, 2001)
