= Land grants in the Swan River Colony =

Coordinates: 31.9559°S 115.8606°E

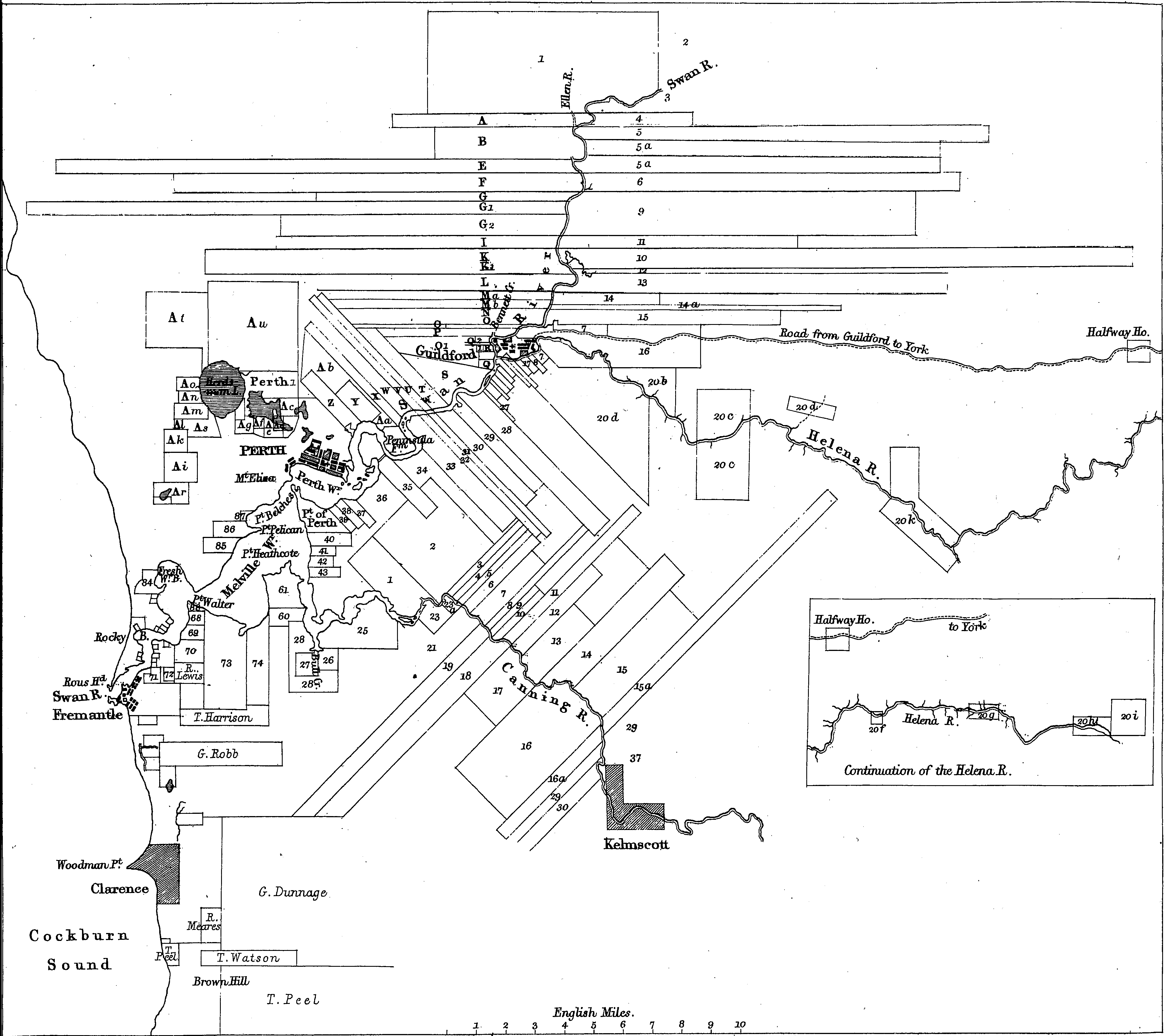
The "Arrowsmith map": an 1839 map of the land grants in the Swan River Colony, drawn by John Arrowsmith from the survey data of John Septimus Roe.

The Swan River Colony, established in June 1829, was the only British colony in Australia established on the basis of land grants to settlers. Under the conditions stipulated by the Colonial Office, settlers would be granted land in proportion to the value of assets and labour that they brought to the colony. To ensure "productive" use of land, settlers were not given full title to their grants until they had been sufficiently "improved". The system of land grants in the Swan River Colony continued until 1832, after which crown land was disposed of by sale at auction.

== Land grants for settlers ==
Under the initial land grant conditions, settlers were granted 16 hectares (40 acres) of land for every £3 of assets invested in the colony. Assessment of the value of assets was left to the discretion of the authorities, whose valuations were inaccurate and inconsistent. One settler observed a tendency to overvalue cattle while undervaluing general cargo, and in one instance two rabbits entitled a settler to a grant of 81 hectares (200 acres).

For the purposes of assessing land entitlements, assets had to be physical capital applicable to land use; money was not assessed. In consequence, many settlers maximised their land entitlements by arriving with large amounts of expensive capital but very little cash. This gross overcapitalisation caused the financial ruin of many early emigrants, and had a lasting deleterious effect on the colony's economy. Moreover, much of the larger machinery that was imported was useless in Western Australian conditions.

Settlers were also entitled to 81 hectares (200 acres) of land for every adult introduced at their expense, with lesser entitlements for children. This condition had the effect of encouraging settlers to bring out indentured servants, and some brought out more than they were capable of employing and supporting in the long term. Indentured servants received their keep, but earned no wages until they had paid off their passage; thus the widespread use of indentured servants tended to immobilise the labour workforce and reduce the market for goods and services.

When the first settlers arrived at the colony, it was quickly discovered that the quantity of good land had been greatly exaggerated. In fact the only good farmland near the site of the colony was a narrow corridor of alluvial soil along the Swan and Canning rivers, and much of this was immediately taken up by government officials and military personnel. The vast amounts of land promised to settlers was so far out of proportion to the available good land that Stirling was obliged to limit the amount of river frontage per grant, forcing the Surveyor-General John Septimus Roe to grant long thin "ribbon" allotments each with a small amount of river frontage. Stirling also limited the amount of land that each settler could claim near Perth, with the balance of their entitlements to be claimed further out, in areas yet to be declared available for selection.

== Improvement conditions ==
To ensure that land holdings were used productively, and to discourage speculation, settlers were initially granted only right of occupation. Full ownership of the land, including the right to sell, was withheld until every acre had been improved by at least one shilling and six pence, through clearing, fencing, cultivation, and so on. Settlers who failed to improve at least a quarter of their grant within three years could be fined, and land not wholly improved within ten years would be resumed by the crown.

Settlers were not permitted to average their improvements over their grant; the conditions specifically stated that every acre had to be improved by 1s 6d. This was to cause much inefficient use of capital in the early years of the colony, as settlers were forced to spread their efforts across their entire grant, rather than consolidating a smaller area first.

Despite the conditions, some settlers found creative ways to retain their land without working it. For example, when George Fletcher Moore arrived in the colony in 1830, he obtained half of William Lamb's grant on the Swan River, by agreeing to perform the improvements necessary to secure title to the entire grant.

== Other land grants ==
Although the land grants to settlers were conditional on their meeting improvement conditions, many unconditional grants were also made. A number of important officials and capitalists were granted large areas of land as reward for service; James Stirling, Charles Fremantle and Thomas Peel were all recipients of such grants. In addition, military personnel were permitted to claim land in lieu of pay, and these grants did not have conditions attached. Much of the land obtained in this way was not developed, being instead held for speculative reasons. The large amounts of good land tied up in this way was often blamed later for the slow progress of the colony.

== Changes to conditions ==
Land grant conditions changed a number of times in the following years. In 1830, in an attempt to discourage speculation, Stirling halved the rate of land grants to 8.1 hectares (20 acres) per £3 of assets plus 40 hectares (100 acres) per adult, and reduced the time limit for improvements from ten years to four. At the end of 1830 the new settlement had granted over 400,000 hectares (1 million acres) to settlers, of which only 68 hectares (169 acres) were actively being farmed.

In 1831, the Colonial Office published what became known as the Ripon Regulations, which declared that crown land in Australia would from 1832 onwards be sold rather than granted. In Western Australia, public opinion held that the abolition of land grants would end emigration to the colony. So concerned were the settlers that Stirling was sent to England to plead their case on this and other matters. He was largely unsuccessful, and the granting of crown land ceased in 1832.

Settlers who had previously been granted land continued to be bound by the grant conditions. In 1837, the Secretary of State for War and the Colonies, Lord Glenelg, responded to constant complaints by settlers about the strict enforcement of improvement conditions, by introducing land surrender provisions that allowed settlers to claim title to part of their grant by surrendering the remainder. Glenelg's intention was to enforce concentrated settlement in accordance with Edward Gibbon Wakefield's colonisation principles, which were in vogue at the time. However, because most settlers had elongated grants of which only a small portion was productive, the effect was to allow many settlers to secure title to their productive land by discarding the unproductive land. Being no longer obliged to improve their holdings, settlers of means could then invest their time and money in discovering and buying good land further from the settlement. Thus the effect was to further disperse the colony, and to concentrate the colony's wealth in a few hands.

== Effect on Noongar people ==
In the framing of the land grant conditions, no provisions were made for the Indigenous people of the area, the Whadjuk Noongar people, who were incorrectly thought to be nomads with no claim to the land over which they travelled. Most settlers refused the Noongar people permission to camp on or even pass through their grants. As more and more land was granted and fenced off, Noongar people were increasingly denied access to their sacred sites and traditional hunting grounds. For example, by 1832 the Noongar Beeliar group were unable to approach the Swan and Canning rivers without danger, because land grants lined the banks.

== General references ==
- Colonial Office Circular, 5 December 1828 – via Wikisource.
- Colonial Office Circular, 3 February 1829 – via Wikisource.
- Colonial Office Circular, 20 July 1830 – via Wikisource.
- Memorandum, 14 April 1831 – via Wikisource.
- Appleyard, R. T.; Manford, Toby (1979). The Beginning: European Discovery and Early Settlement of Swan River Western Australia. Nedlands, Western Australia: University of Western Australia Press. ISBN 0-85564-146-0.
- Cameron, James (2000). Reece, Bob (ed.). "George Fletcher Moore". Studies in Western Australian History. The Irish in Western Australia (20). Nedlands, Western Australia: Centre for Western Australian History, Department of History, University of Western Australia: 21–34. ISSN 0314-7525. OCLC 988224890.

== Sources ==
- Statham, Pamela (1 December 1981). "Swan River Colony". In C. T. Stannage (ed.). A New History of Western Australia. Nedlands: UWA Publishing. ISBN 0-85564-181-9. LCCN 82101009. OCLC 963830667. OL 3517729M. Wikidata Q125995168.
