= 2023 Wanneroo bushfire =

Bushfire in Perth, Western Australia

- Date: 22 – 26 November 2023

Statistics
- Burned area: 1,900 hectares (4,700 acres)
- Land use: Urban/rural areas, housing properties

Impacts
- Deaths: None
- Evacuated: 130 people
- Structures destroyed: 18 houses
- Cost: Unknown

Ignition
- Cause: Ground fire

The 2023 Wanneroo bushfire began on 22 November 2023 in Mariginiup in the City of Wanneroo, Western Australia. The fire forced evacuations of residents and eighteen houses were destroyed. The fire destroyed over 1,900 hectares (4,700 acres) of land, including farmland and houses in localities in the City of Wanneroo and the adjoining City of Swan. The Department of Fire and Emergency Services (DFES). The presence of fire weather was an important factor in the ignition and propagation of this fire. On 29 December, the DFES announced its findings that the fire was ignited by ground fire.

== Background ==
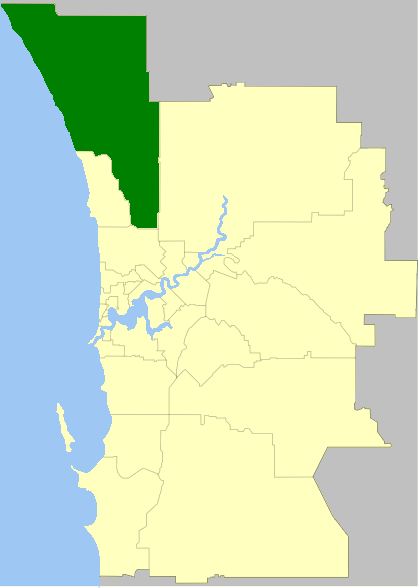
A map showing the City of Wanneroo in Western Australia. The adjoining metropolitan LGA to its right is the City of Swan, also affected.

The City of Wanneroo is a peri-urban city in the Perth greater metropolitan area. Wanneroo lies 28 km north of the Perth central business district. It comprises some 36 suburbs. On census day 2021, the population of Wanneroo was 209,111 living in 78,029 dwellings.

Wanneroo lies within a fire prone area. The landscape includes vegetation with a high fuel load such as the Jarrah Forest with its undergrowth, parks and reserves. Wanneroo is also prone to fire weather (hot, dry, windy days) with a bushfire season between October to April.

The suburbs of Wanneroo severely affected by the Wanneroo fire of 2023 included Banksia Grove, Mariginiup, Wanneroo, and Tapping. Other affected suburbs included Ashby, Carramar, Jandabup, Melaleuca, Sinagra and Wangara.

== Timeline ==
=== 22 November ===
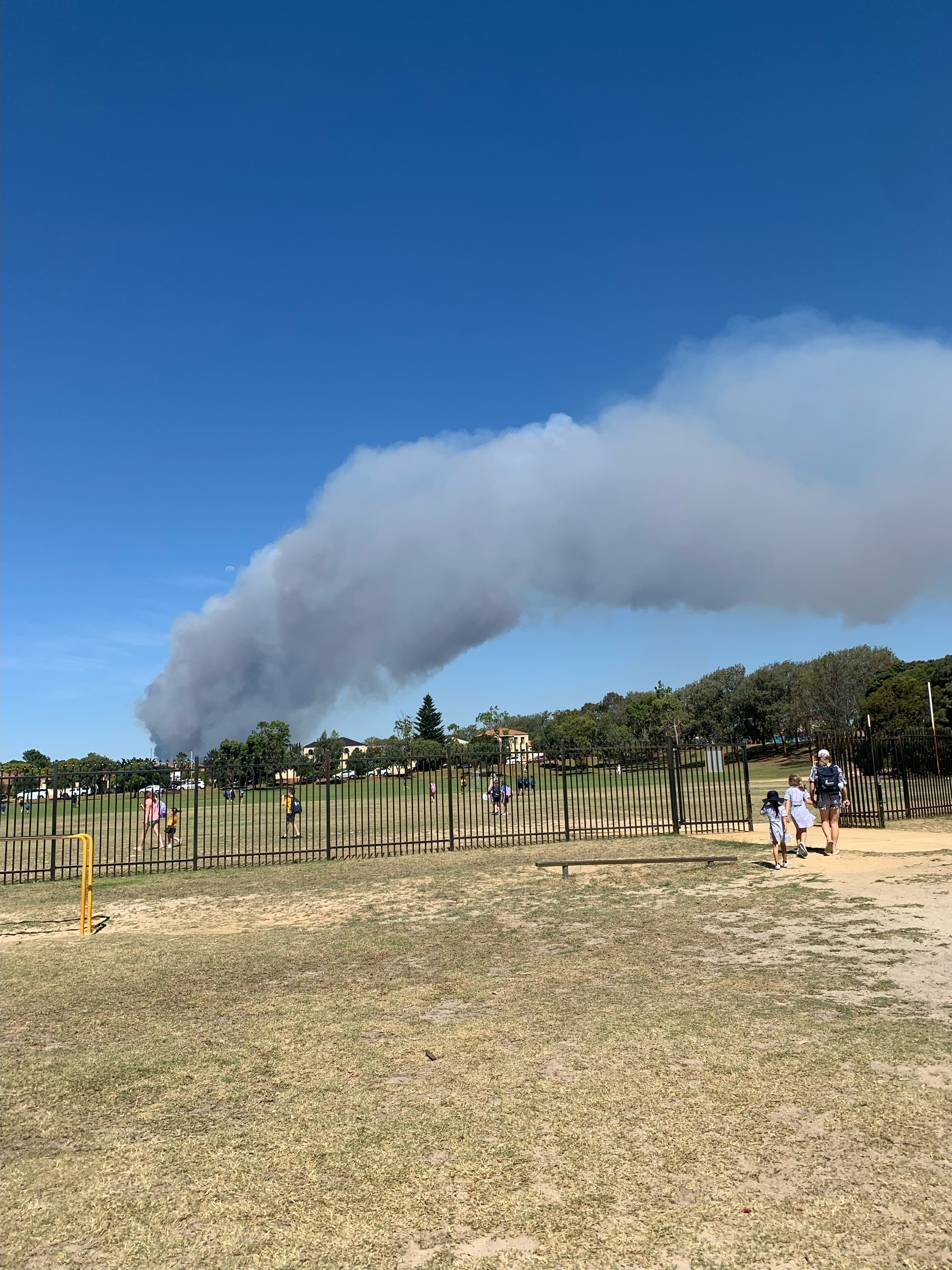
Photo of the bushfire from Currambine primary school at 2:44 PM

The fire began in the suburb of Mariginiup at around 1:00 p.m. On that day, a maximum temperature close to 40 °C and wind gusts of up to 41 km/h created fire weather. The fire moved quickly in a westerly direction. Over 120 firefighters were dispatched to the fire and bushfire emergency warnings were broadcast. Some residents were advised to shelter in place as it was no longer safe to leave. An evacuation center for displaced residents was established at the Wanneroo Recreation Centre. At 10 pm, the fire was still moving rapidly.

=== 23 November ===
Overnight, the fire continued uncontrolled. Police and firefighters placed traffic restrictions at critical road intersections. Australia Post cancelled all deliveries to the areas affected by the bushfire. During the morning, the fire intensified. High temperatures to 40°C and wind gusts of up to 65 km/h continued. In Tapping, multiple sheds were destroyed. At 2.30 p.m., further evacuations were ordered. Wanneroo Secondary College was closed. By 10 p.m. the fire area was over 1700 acres (680 hectares) and houses had been destroyed. Fire fighting efforts were predicted to continue for days.

=== 24 November ===
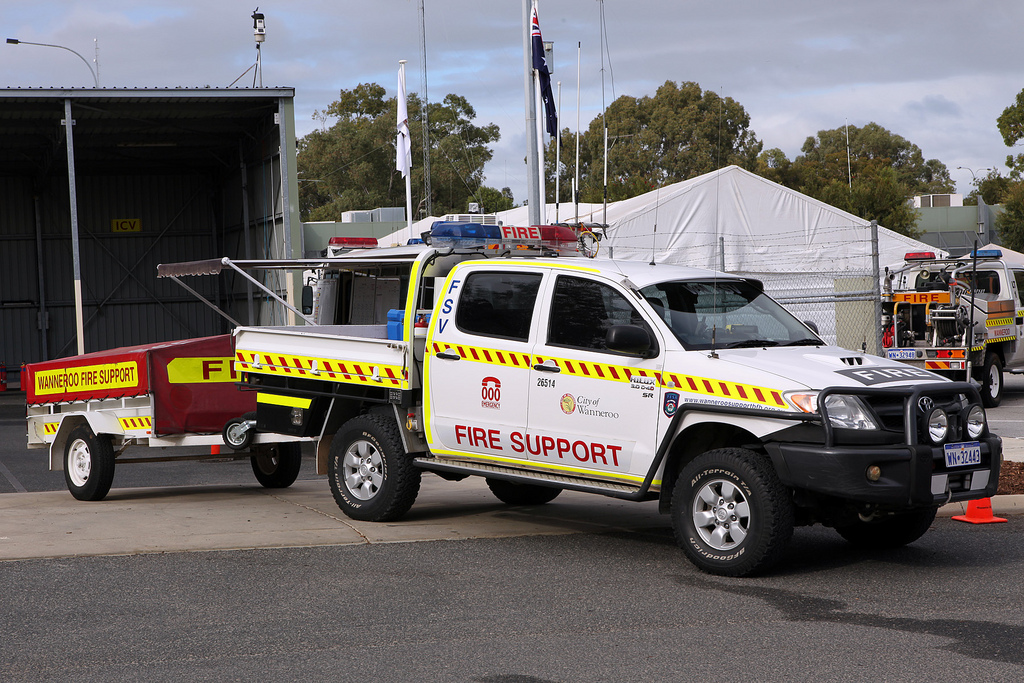
DFES Wanneroo Fire Support

By the morning of 24 November, DFES had partial control of the fire. However, the fire remained active throughout the day. In the afternoon at 3 p.m., Roger Cook, premier of Western Australia, announced a total of 18 homes had been lost to the fire. Fire weather was predicted to continue for two days.

=== 25 November ===
In the afternoon, Cook reported that no further houses had been lost. The DFES had the fire contained but structures remained under threat. The Bureau of Meteorology (BOM) predicted ongoing fire weather with strong gusts until mid-morning the following day. Stephen Dawson, Western Australia's emergency services minister, said that residents whose home were severely damaged or destroyed were eligible to receive $4,000 and those who were affected otherwise to $2,000 of government funding.

=== 26 November ===
At 9:00 am, DFES advised 18 homes have been lost and another 30 were damaged. The fire was contained but Watch and Act warnings (advice to residents) remained in place in Jandabup, Melaleuca, Wanneroo and Mariginiup. Residents were advised, for their safety, not to return to their properties in fire affected areas. Electricity was yet to be restored to some areas. At 3:40 pm, the DFES confirmed that the Wanneroo bushfire had been contained and controlled. Watch and Act warnings were down-graded to a Bushfire Advice level. Clint Kuchel, the DFES spokesman said the fire area was unchanged but no further homes had been lost. 130 firefighters continued to fight the fire. Some roads had been opened when safe to do so. 150 homes remained without power.
