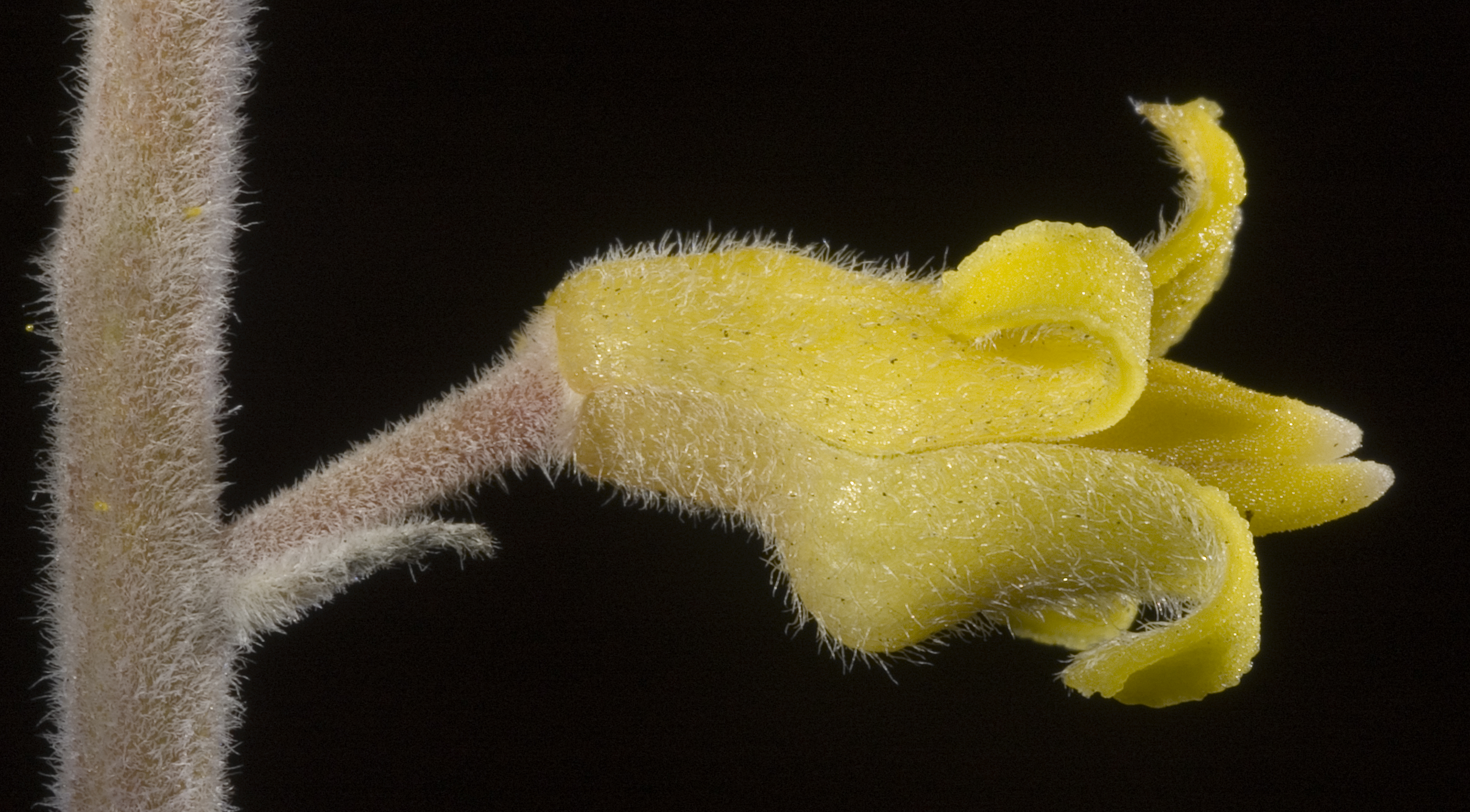

Scientific classification
- Kingdom: Plantae
- Clade: Tracheophytes
- Clade: Angiosperms
- Clade: Eudicots
- Order: Proteales
- Family: Proteaceae
- Genus: Persoonia
- Species: P. saccata

Binomial name
- Persoonia saccata R.Br.

Synonyms
- Linkia saccata (R.Br.) Kuntze; Persoonia fraseri R.Br. Persoonia macrostachya Lindl.

= Persoonia saccata =

Species of flowering plant

Persoonia saccata, commonly known as snottygobble (although this name is used for several other species), and cadgeegurrup in indigenous language, is a plant in the family Proteaceae and is endemic to the south-west of Western Australia. It is usually an erect shrub and has linear leaves and groups of up to fifty or more irregularly shaped, yellow flowers which are hairy on the outside. It usually grows in woodland dominated by jarrah (Eucalyptus marginata), marri (Corymbia calophylla) or large Banksia species.

== Description ==
Persoonia saccata is usually an erect, sometimes a spreading shrub and has many main stems. It grows to a height of 0.2–1.5 m (0.7–5 ft) with a large underground lignotuber. The bark on the trunk is mostly smooth and grey. The leaves are arranged alternately and are linear in shape with the edges rolled under, 50–170 mm (2–7 in) long and about 1 mm (0.04 in) wide. The leaves are soft and flexible, hairy when young and a similar colour on both surfaces, with the veins usually not visible. The flowers are arranged in groups of between ten and fifty or more at the ends of the branches or in leaf axils. Each flower is on the end of a hairy pedicel 3.5–12 mm (0.1–0.5 in) long and held more or less horizontally. The groups have a stalk 20–250 mm (0.8–10 in) long. The flower is composed of four bright yellow, hairy tepals 9–14 mm (0.4–0.6 in) long, which are fused at the base but with the tips rolled back. The flower is irregular in shape with the lowest tepal having a sac-like or pouch-like shape. The tepals are joined at the base with the tips rolled back, so that it resembles a cross when viewed end-on. The central style is surrounded by four bright yellow anthers with white tips and which are also of different lengths. The anthers are fused to the tepals and unlike those in most other persoonias, are joined from base to tip. Flowering occurs from July to January and is followed by fruit which are smooth, oval shaped drupes containing a nut-like pyrene 8–11 mm (0.3–0.4 in) long and 4.5–6 mm (0.18–0.24 in) wide.

== Taxonomy and naming ==
Persoonia saccata was first formally described in 1830 by Robert Brown and the description was published in Supplementum primum Prodromi florae Novae Hollandiae. The specific epithet (saccata) is derived from the Latin word sacca meaning "bag".

German botanist Otto Kuntze proposed the binomial name Linkia saccata in 1891, from Cavanilles' original description of the genus Linkia but the name was eventually rejected in favour of Persoonia.

The genus was reviewed by Peter Weston for the Flora of Australia treatment in 1995, and P. saccata was placed in the Teretifolia group, a group of 10 species with distinctive flowers. Their hooked pistils are much shorter than those of other persoonias, with the stigma sunk into a hollow within the tepals.

== Distribution and habitat ==
This persoonia grows in forest or woodland dominated by jarrah or marri, sometimes banksias. It is found in near-coastal districts between Lake Pinjar and the Blackwood River in the Avon Wheatbelt, Esperance Plains, Jarrah Forest, Swan Coastal Plain and Warren biogeographic regions.

== Ecology ==
The species regenerates vigorously after bushfire from its woody lignotuber. The following summer it produces large groups of flowers, but the number decreases in subsequent years, until the plant only produces short shoots and no flowers.

== Conservation ==
Persoonia saccata is classified as "not threatened" by the Western Australian Government Department of Parks and Wildlife.
