= Padbury Senior High School =

Defunct school in Perth, Western Australia

Location
- Giles Avenue, Padbury, Perth, Western Australia; 31.806197°S 115.762553°E

Information
- Type: Public, secondary, co-educational, day school
- Motto: Imagine, Create, Achieve
- Established: 1987
- Closed: 2011
- Principal: Trevor Drinkwater
- Enrolment: 154 (2011)
- Campus: Padbury
- Colours: Navy blue, red & white
- Website: www.padbury.wa.edu.au

Padbury Senior High School was a government, co-educational, secondary day school located in the Perth suburb of Padbury, Western Australia. It was administered by the Western Australian Department of Education and had a final enrolment of 154 students with a teaching staff of 31 at the time of closing in 2011. The school served students from Year 8 to Year 12.

On 27 October 2010, the education minister at the time, Liz Constable, announced that Padbury Senior High School would close at the end of 2011 due to declining enrolment. The school operated until Friday, 9 December 2011. The site is now occupied by the Statewide Services Resource and Information Centre for the Department of Education.

== History ==
The school opened in 1987 with Year 8 students drawn from various primary schools in the surrounding area. The school was named after Walter Padbury – one of Western Australia's early pioneers.

The school was upgraded in 2006 following the closure of nearby Craigie Senior High School at the end of 2003. Students from Craigie were enrolled at either Padbury or Belridge Senior High School and both schools received upgrades to cope with higher student numbers.

In 2010, it was decided that Padbury Senior High would close at the end of 2011 due to declining enrolments, and an expected student population of under 200. Students enrolled at Padbury Senior High School would move to either of the nearby schools Duncraig Senior High and Belridge Senior High. Students who attended the schools Autism Extension Program (AEP) were transferred to Ocean Reef Senior High School to continue their enrolment.

== Demographics ==
In 2008, the school had a student enrolment of 465 students with 43 teachers (39.8 full-time equivalent) and 22 non-teaching staff (12.5 full-time equivalent). Female enrolments consisted of 235 students and Male enrolments consisted of 230 students; Indigenous enrolments accounted for a total of 3% and 10% of students had a language background other than English.

In 2009, the school had a student enrolment of 434 students with 47 teachers (41 full-time equivalent) and 24 non-teaching staff (14.6 full-time equivalent). Female enrolments consisted of 224 students and Male enrolments consisted of 210 students; Indigenous enrolments accounted for a total of 3% and 10% of students had a language background other than English.

In 2010, the school had a student enrolment of 362 students with 39 teachers (36.8 full-time equivalent) and 25 non-teaching staff (15.5 full-time equivalent). Female enrolments consisted of 179 students and Male enrolments consisted of 183 students; Indigenous enrolments accounted for a total of 4% and 9% of students had a language background other than English.

In 2011, the school had a student enrolment of 154 students with 31 teachers (28.8 full-time equivalent) and 14 non-teaching staff (7.7 full-time equivalent). Female enrolments consisted of 82 students and Male enrolments consisted of 72 students; Indigenous enrolments accounted for a total of 2% and 8% of students had a language background other than English.

== Campus ==
The Padbury Senior High School campus was located in a suburban area. Facilities of the school included a Performing Arts Theatre, a Visual Arts Centre, a Photography Laboratory, a Pastoral Care Centre and specialist facilities in Music, Home Economics, Design and Technology, Business Education, Computing and Physical Education. In addition, the school had two ovals, tennis courts and cricket nets.

== Special programs ==
Padbury Senior High School had a number of special programs running within the school, such as:

- Marine Studies – including an internationally accredited scuba training program
- School Based Academic Extension
- Autism Education Unit
- Arts Scholarship Program
- International Exchange Program

== Notable alumni ==
- Andrew Tye, cricket player

== See also ==
- Education in Western Australia
- List of schools in the Perth metropolitan area
