= Division of Pearce =

Australian federal electoral division

Coordinates: 31.655°S 116.299°E

Pearce Australian House of Representatives Division
- Interactive map of electorate boundaries from the 2025 federal election
- Created: 1989
- MP: Tracey Roberts
- Party: Labor
- Namesake: Sir George Pearce
- Electors: 115,296 (2022)
- Area: 783 km^{2} (302.3 sq mi)
- Demographic: Outer metropolitan
Electorates around Pearce:
| Indian Ocean | Durack | Durack |
| Indian Ocean | Pearce | Durack |
| Moore | Cowan | Hasluck |

The Division of Pearce is an Australian electoral division in the state of Western Australia. It was created at the 1989 redistribution and named after George Pearce, the longest serving member of the Australian Senate, serving from 1901 to 1938. For most of its existence, Pearce was a hybrid urban-rural seat that covered Perth's outer northern suburbs before fanning inland from the Indian Ocean to take in portions of the Wheatbelt southeast, east and northeast of the capital. However, as of the 2021 redistribution, Pearce is largely coterminous with the City of Wanneroo in Perth's northern suburbs. It has had four members: Fred Chaney, Judi Moylan, Christian Porter, and Tracey Roberts. The first three were members of the Liberal Party, whereas Roberts, a former mayor of Wanneroo, is a member of the Labor Party.

== Geography ==
Federal electoral division boundaries in Australia are determined at redistributions by a redistribution committee appointed by the Australian Electoral Commission. Redistributions occur for the boundaries of divisions in a particular state, and they occur every seven years, or sooner if a state's representation entitlement changes or when divisions of a state are malapportioned.

As of the 2022 Australian federal election, Pearce largely overlaps with the City of Wanneroo in the northern suburbs of Perth, the capital of Western Australia. The seat covers an area of 783 square kilometres (302 sq mi), and is bounded by Hepburn Avenue to the south, Wanneroo Road, Ocean Reef Road, the City of Wanneroo boundary and the Indian Ocean to the west, the City of Wanneroo boundary to the north and north-east, the Melaleuca–Bullsbrook boundary to the east, and Tonkin Highway to the south-east. The seat presently includes:

=== City of Wanneroo ===
- Alkimos
- Ashby
- Banksia Grove
- Butler
- Carabooda
- Carramar
- Clarkson
- Darch
- Eglinton
- Gnangara
- Hocking
- Jandabup
- Jindalee
- Landsdale
- Madeley
- Mariginiup
- Merriwa
- Mindarie
- Neerabup
- Nowergup
- Pearsall
- Pinjar
- Quinns Rocks
- Ridgewood
- Sinagra
- Tamala Park
- Tapping
- Two Rocks
- Wangara
- Wanneroo
- Yanchep

=== City of Swan ===
- Ballajura (part)
- Cullacabardee
- Lexia (part)
- Melaleuca

=== Redistributions ===
When proclaimed at the 1989 redistribution, Pearce was created from territory excised from the urban divisions of Canning, Moore and the rural O'Connor. From the division of Canning came 31,999 electors, covering most of the Shire of Kalamunda as well as Karragullen and Roleystone within the City of Armadale and Helena Valley within the Shire of Mundaring. From the division of Moore came 23,490 electors from the Shire of Chittering, most of the remaining parts of the Shire of Mundaring, and the City of Swan north of Roe Highway. From the division of O'Connor came 7,255 electors from the Town of Northam and the shires of Northam and Toodyay. Pearce had a mixture of urban and rural areas, covering the Swan Valley, the Perth Hills and part of the western Wheatbelt.

At the 1997 redistribution, Pearce gained the Wheatbelt shires of Beverley and York from the division of O'Connor. This increased the Liberal Party's two-party-preferred vote lead over the Labor Party in Pearce by 1.7%.

At the 2000 redistribution, Pearce gained the northern parts of the City of Wanneroo from the division of Moore, stretching along the coast from Tamala Park to Two Rocks. From the division of O'Connor, Pearce gained the Wheatbelt shires of Boddington, Brookton, Cuballing, Narrogin, Pingelly, Wandering and Williams, and the Town of Narrogin. However, it lost a small part of the City of Armadale to the division of Canning, and most of the Shire of Kalamunda, a small part of the Shire of Mundaring and a small part of the City of Swan to the division of Hasluck. The largest area of enrolment in the redistributed Division of Pearce in 1999 was the Shire of Mundaring, with an enrolment of 14,180, followed by the City of Wanneroo, with 13,248, and the City of Swan, with 10,429. All of the Wheatbelt local governments had relatively low populations, each with a few thousand at most.

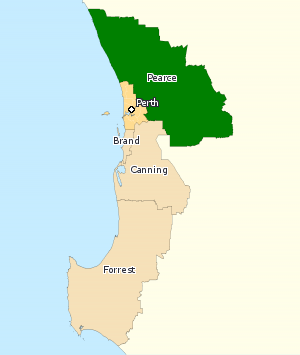
Division of Pearce as of the 2008 redistribution.

Pearce lost several Wheatbelt shires at the 2008 redistribution. The Shire of Boddington was transferred to the division of Canning. The shires of Brookton, Cuballing, Narrogin, Pingelly, Wandering and Williams, and the Town of Narrogin were transferred to the division of O'Connor. Two small boundary changes were made in the Perth metropolitan region as well: the boundary within the City of Wanneroo was moved north, which transferred Clarkson, Mindarie, Neerabup and Tamala Park to the division of Moore; and the boundary within the City of Swan was moved slightly south to Reid Highway.

At the 2016 redistribution, the shires of Kalamunda and Mundaring, as well as Gidgegannup within the City of Swan, were transferred to the divisions of Canning and Hasluck.

For most of its existence, Pearce covered the Swan Valley, the Perth Hills and part of the western Wheatbelt. At the 2021 redistribution, Pearce had an excess of electors and it bordered five divisions that were short of the quota for electors. Additionally, a division needed to be abolished in Western Australia since the state's population was not growing as fast as other states, and Pearce was one of the most likely possibilities for this. In a submission to the AEC, the Labor Party proposed that Pearce be abolished because it was "unsustainable" and the least disruptive option. In the end, it was decided to abolish Stirling and not Pearce. The division did however undergo major changes. It lost all of its rural territory in the Wheatbelt (including the Shires of Beverley, Gingin, Chittering, Northam, Toodyay, and York) along with the Swan suburbs of Aveley, Baskerville, Belhus, Brabham, Brigadoon, Dayton, Ellenbrook, Henley Brook, Herne Hill, Millendon, The Vines, Upper Swan, West Swan and Whiteman, a portion of Lexia, and its portions of Middle Swan and Red Hill. As a consequence, the division became entirely urban, covering the City of Wanneroo (including the suburbs of Alkimos, Ashby, Ballajura, (Note: Only partially within the Division of Pearce) Banksia Grove, Butler, Carabooda, Carramar, Clarkson, Darch, Eglinton, Gnangara, Hocking, Jandabup, Jindalee, Landsdale, Madeley, Mariginiup, Merriwa, Mindarie, Neerabup, Nowergup, Pearsall, Pinjar, Quinns Rocks, Ridgewood, Sinagra, Tamala Park, Tapping, Two Rocks, Wangara, Wanneroo and Yanchep) and a small part of the City of Swan (including the suburbs of Cullacabardee, Lexia and Melaleuca). The boundary was extended south to Hepburn Avenue as well. The redistributed Division of Pearce covers only 6% of its previous area.

== Demographics ==
At the 2016 Australian census, which used the boundaries from the 2016 redistribution, the Division of Pearce had a median age of 33, below the state average of 36 and the national average of 38. 50.8% of residents over 15 were married, slightly higher than the state average of 48.8% and the national average of 48.1%. 13.1% of residents had a bachelor's degree or above, below the state average of 20.5% and the national average of 22.0%.

56.4% of Pearce's residents were born in Australia, compared to the state average of 60.3% and the national average of 66.7%. The next-most-common birthplaces were England (12.8%), New Zealand (4.3%), South Africa (2.9%), India (1.8%), and Scotland (1.7%). 44.0% of residents had both parents born overseas and 34.4% had both parents born in Australia. The most common ancestries were English (31.6%), Australian (22.9%), Scottish (6.7%), Irish (6.5%), and Italian (2.5%). The most common religious affiliations were no religion (33.8%), Catholic (19.3%), Anglican (16.9%), and Christian, nfd (3.7%).

The most common occupations were technicians and trade workers (18.7%), clerical and administrative workers (14.0%), professionals (14.0%), community and personal service workers (11.9%), managers (11.1%), labourers (10.6%), sales workers (9.6%), and machinery operators and drivers (8.5%). The most common industries of employment were hospitals (3.1%), supermarket and grocery stores (2.9%), iron ore mining (2.4%), aged care residential services (2.3%), and primary education (2.2%). The median weekly personal and household incomes were slightly above the state and national averages, but the median weekly family income was below the state average and above the national average.

35.4% of families consisted of a couple without children, below the state and national averages. 48.1% of families consisted of a couple with children, above the state and national averages. 90.6% of dwellings were detached houses, 8.1% of dwellings were semi-detached, and 0.6% of dwellings were apartments or flats.

== History ==
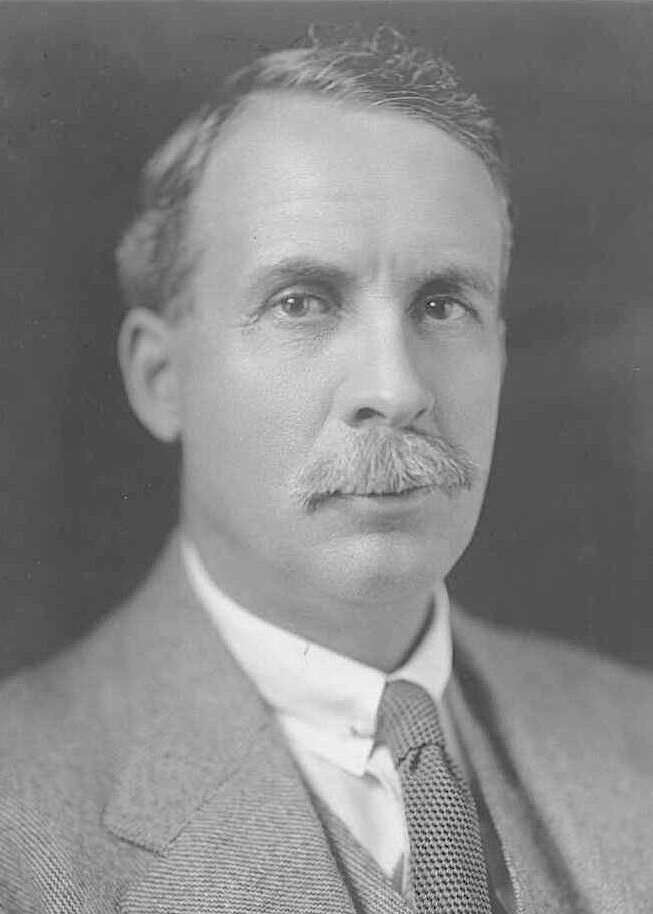
Sir George Pearce, the division's namesake

The division was named after Sir George Pearce, a founder of the Australian Labor Party in Western Australia and the longest-serving member of the Australian Senate, serving from 1901 to 1936. He started his career as a Labor Party politician, but joined the Nationalist Party in 1917 and the United Australia Party in 1931. He was Australia's longest serving Minister for Defence, serving for a total of 12 years, and was acting prime minister for seven months whilst Billy Hughes visited Europe.

Pearce was proclaimed on 31 March 1989, with it being created at the 1989 redistribution due to high population growth in Western Australia. It was the 14th division created in the state and it was first contested at the 1990 federal election. It has been contested by the Liberal Party, the Labor Party and the Australian Greens at every election for its existence. It has also been contested by the National Party at every election except 1990, 1996, 2004 and 2007, and the Australian Democrats at every election from 1990 to 2004. The division has been held by the Liberal Party, Australia's main centre-right party, for its entire existence.

The inaugural member of the Division of Pearce was Fred Chaney, who had been a senator for Western Australia from 1974 to 1990, leader of the opposition in the Senate from 1984 to 1990, and deputy leader of the Liberal Party from 1989 to 1990. He had also served in various ministries in the government of Malcolm Fraser from 1978 to 1983. Chaney had wanted to move to the House of Representatives since at least 1981, with him unsuccessfully seeking preselection for the division of Curtin that year. Following criticism of Chaney for his part in replacing John Howard as Liberal leader by Andrew Peacock at the 1989 Liberal Party leadership spill, he chose not to contest the 1993 election.

At the 1993 election, Liberal candidate Judi Moylan was elected. She comfortably won every election from then until her retirement in 2013. She served as Minister for Family Services and Minister assisting the Prime Minister for the Status of Women from 1996 to 1998. Following the 1996 election, she was a backbencher, during which time she criticised many of the Liberal government's more conservative policies.

On 12 June 2012, Christian Porter, the treasurer of Western Australia since 2010 and Attorney-General of Western Australia since 2008, announced his resignation from those roles in order to seek preselection for the Division of Pearce. Porter retained the seat for the Liberal Party. In his bid for re-election in 2016, however, Porter suffered a five-point swing to reduce his margin to seven percent, just barely within the range of being fairly safe.

The 2021 redistribution made Pearce notionally a marginally Liberal seat, with a majority of 5.2 percent. At the 2022 election, the former mayor of Wanneroo, Tracey Roberts, became the first Labor member ever to win it. Roberts picked up a swing of over 14 percent amid the large swing to Labor across Western Australia. This was enough to give her a majority of 9.4 percent, on the stronger side of fairly safe (and just on the edge of turning it into a safe Labor seat in one stroke).

== Members ==
| Image | Member | Party | Term | Notes |
|---|---|---|---|---|
| | Fred Chaney (1941–) | Liberal | 24 March 1990 – 8 February 1993 | Previously a member of the Senate. Retired |
| | Judi Moylan (1944–) | Liberal | 13 March 1993 – 5 August 2013 | Served as minister under Howard. Retired |
| | Christian Porter (1970–) | Liberal | 7 September 2013 – 11 April 2022 | Previously held the Western Australian Legislative Assembly seat of Bateman. Served as minister under Turnbull and Morrison. Retired |
| | Tracey Roberts (1961–) | Labor | 21 May 2022 – present | Incumbent |

== Election results ==
2025 Australian federal election: Pearce
| Party | Candidate | Votes | % | ±% |
|---|---|---|---|---|
| Labor | Tracey Roberts | 39,303 | 40.07 | −2.33 |
| Liberal | Jan Norberger | 27,979 | 28.52 | −1.60 |
| Greens | Nicholas D'Alonzo | 11,640 | 11.87 | +0.63 |
| One Nation | John Burton | 9,089 | 9.27 | +4.57 |
| Legalise Cannabis | Ramon Granados Rangel | 6,777 | 6.91 | +6.91 |
| Christians | Vanessa Montgomery | 3,305 | 3.37 | +1.39 |
| Total formal votes | | 98,093 | 96.94 | +2.96 |
| Informal votes | | 3,094 | 3.06 | −2.96 |
| Turnout | | 101,187 | 87.78 | +5.43 |
Two-party-preferred result
| Labor | Tracey Roberts | 55,360 | 56.44 | −2.40 |
| Liberal | Jan Norberger | 42,733 | 43.56 | +2.40 |
| Labor hold | | Swing | −2.40 | |
