= Wanneroo Secondary College =

Location
- 56 Quarkum Street; Wanneroo, Western Australia; Australia; 31°45′28″S 115°48′53″E

Information
- Former name: Wanneroo High School Wanneroo Senior High School
- Type: Independent public co-educational day school
- Opened: 1977; 49 years ago
- Educational authority: WA Department of Education
- Specialist: Australian rules football; Performing arts
- Principal: Justine Mcnaught-Conroy
- Years: 7–12
- Enrolment: 1,259 (2021)
- Campus type: Suburban
- Colour
- Website: wanneroosc.wa.edu.au

Wanneroo Secondary College is an Independent Public secondary school in Wanneroo, a suburb 22 kilometres (14 mi) north of Perth, Western Australia.

== Overview ==
The school was established as Wanneroo High School in 1977, starting out with 180 Year 8 students. At the time, the school was the northernmost high school in Perth, with students coming from as far as Yanchep. In 1987, David John Holthouse, a student at Wanneroo Senior High School won the Beazley Medal, the most prestigious academic award for secondary school students in Western Australia. By 1988, the school had changed name to Wanneroo Senior High School. The school was renamed again in 2013 to Wanneroo Secondary College, coinciding with it becoming an Independent Public School.

In May 2012, an upgrade was announced to give the school adequate facilities for the transition of Year 7 students to high school in 2015. The $4.34 million upgrade was opened in May 2014, under the original $6.2 million budget. It included five new classrooms, a new science laboratory and science preparation area, computer hub and staffroom. In 2015, the school opened to Year 7 students for the first time, alongside most other public high schools in Western Australia.

In December 2019, construction started on an upgrade to sports facilities at Wanneroo Secondary College. The $5 million upgrade included a new sports hall and improvements to existing tennis courts. The upgrade was one of Labor's 2017 election commitments. It was completed in November 2020, a month ahead of schedule.

In December 2022, the new performing arts centre was completed and opened to students at a cost of $6.2 million going overbudget from the original plan of $5 million for both the performing arts centre and canteen, due to this the plans for the upgraded canteen never went forward.

In May 2023, the state government announced it will invest $12.4 million to establish a new inclusive education support program and associated facilities at Wanneroo Secondary College to cater for 80 students with low to moderate needs to take pressure off Belridge Secondary College.

== Programs ==
Wanneroo Secondary College has two Department of Education endorsed specialist programs. They are for Australian rules football and specialist performing arts.

== Local intake area ==
Wanneroo Secondary College's local intake area covers Ashby, Gnangara, Hocking, Jandabup, Pearsall, Sinagra and Wanneroo. Students in the local intake area have a guaranteed place at the school if they apply. Students outside the local intake area can apply to the school, and they will be accepted on a case-by-case basis.

== Academic results ==
Year	Rank	Median ATAR	Eligible students	Students with ATAR	% Students with ATAR	Ref
2021	—N/a	64.00	136	38	27.94%	
2020	131	63.35	148	27	18.24%	
2019	130	64.40	134	35	26.12%	
2018	142	59.25	209	55	26.32%	
2017	139	59.75	197	61	30.96%	
2016	128	65.25	143	47	32.87%	

== Student numbers ==
Year	Number
2016	1,065
2017	1,032
2018	1,057
2019	1,090
2020	1,176
2022	1,303

== Notable alumni ==
- Sabine Winton – Labor member for Wanneroo
- Sally Hunter (née Foster) - Commonwealth Games silver medallist for swimming, two time Olympic representative

== See also ==
- List of schools in the Perth metropolitan area
