= Cullacabardee, Western Australia =

Cullacabardee
- Suburb
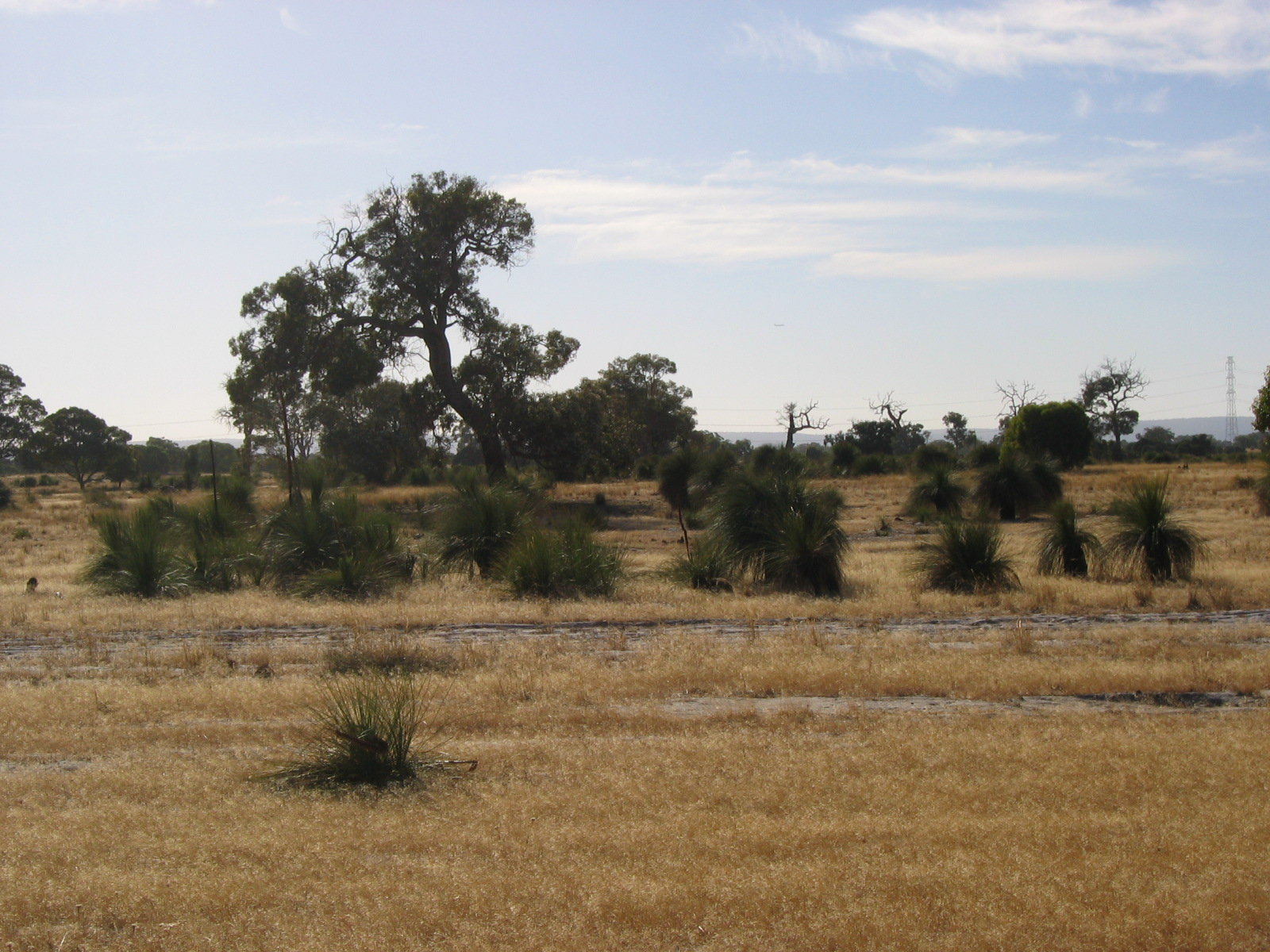
- View east of Cullacabardee
- Interactive map of Cullacabardee
- Coordinates: 31.815°S 115.91°E
- Country: Australia
- State: Western Australia
- City: Perth
- LGA: City of Swan
- Location: 21 km (13 mi) from Perth City

Government
  - State electorate: West Swan
  - Federal division: Pearce

Area
  - Total: 13 km^{2} (5.0 sq mi)

Population
  - Total: 45 (SAL 2021)
- Postcode: 6067
Suburbs around Cullacabardee
Gnangara	Lexia	Lexia
Landsdale	Cullacabardee	Whiteman
Alexander Heights	Ballajura	Whiteman

Cullacabardee is a northeastern rural suburb of Perth, the capital city of Western Australia, located 21 km (13 mi) from Perth's central business district via Alexander Drive or Tonkin Highway. It is in the City of Swan local government area. Most of the suburb is covered in native sheoak and banksia forest. A small Noongar community is based on Baal Street, a drug rehabilitation retreat is located off Gnangara Road in the suburb's northeast, and the Perth International Telecommunications Centre facility is based in the suburb's northwest.

== Geography ==
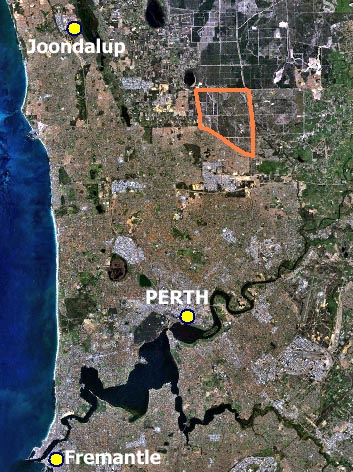
Location of Cullacabardee (orange) within the northern suburbs of Perth

Cullacabardee is 21 kilometres (13 mi) north of Perth's central business district, beyond the residential suburb of Ballajura. It covers approximately 13 square kilometres (5 sq mi)) and its borders are Gnangara Road to the north, Alexander Drive to the west, Tonkin Highway to the east and Hepburn Avenue to the south. Only one public road, Baal Street, enters the locality.

Much of the suburb's area, formerly owned by the Western Australian Planning Commission and known as "IP8 West", became part of Whiteman Park on 31 March 2000 and contains about 5 square kilometres (2 sq mi) of regionally significant bushland. The remaining sections are zoned General Rural under the City of Swan's 1993 Cullacabardee Rural Plan.

Cullacabardee is located over an unconfined aquifer known as the Gnangara Mound, a major supplier of scheme groundwater to the Perth Metropolitan Area. The area is classified as an underground Water Pollution Control Area under the Water Authority Act 1984 and a Priority 1 drinking water source by the now defunct Department of Water. A survey of soils in the area in April 1999 indicated that Cullacabardee's soil is located in the Bassendean Sand soil association, and is a leached white siliceous sand of mineral quartz, with negligible phosphorus retention capability. Vegetation is mainly low woodland forests of sheoak and banksia, with scattered jarrah.

== Cullacabardee Aboriginal community ==
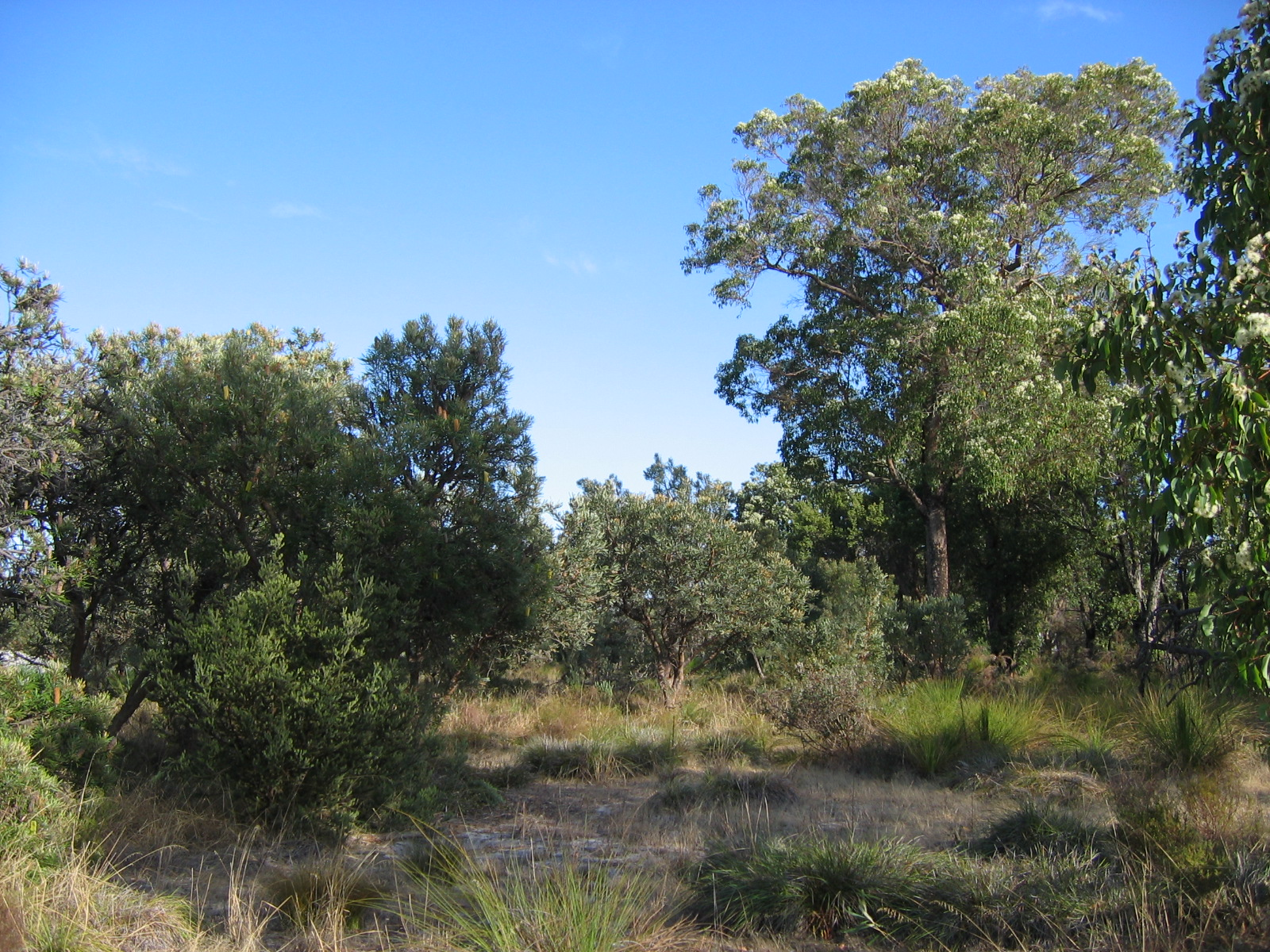
Banksia forest in western Cullacabardee

The community at Cullacabardee, originally consisting of 30 units set in 40 hectares of bushland, has existed since about 1980, and was designed for four different groups who the Western Australian Government perceived to be "having difficulty surviving in suburbia" and who would otherwise be homeless. Families were first moved into the homes on 8 October 1980 and the Cullacabardee Aboriginal Corporation was registered and incorporated on 21 March 1984 under paragraph 45(1) of the Aboriginal Councils and Associations Act 1976, and is vested in the Aboriginal Lands Trust. The community's housing is managed by the state's Department of Housing, but local programs and maintenance are managed by the Aboriginal Corporation and funded by federal and state governments.

At its height the community numbered over a hundred residents. As of August 2024, the community had "about a dozen" residents living in the five homes remaining.

=== Alleged problems ===
Some discussion in local media has focussed on alleged problems within the community. In 1999, The Australian reported that many of Cullacabardee's residents were unemployed, had no public transport despite 20 years of State Government management and no access to jobs, shops, education or health services. The article noted that "residents have to walk up to 6 km (4 mi) along a dangerously busy road or through a bush track to reach a shop or bus stop", and that the nearest primary school is 8 km (5 mi) away. Nine derelict homes in the community were being refurbished under a training scheme to assist young community members to gain skills, although the community claimed that funding was only available for 12-month periods, making apprenticeships (which run for several years) impossible to offer. A review report into the community in 2000 identified these and other issues such as the land being zoned General Rural, effectively prohibiting residential development, and the illegal dumping of concrete demolition rubble and other refuse near the community.

In 2003, a series of articles in The West Australian newspaper claimed that gun violence, threats to women and children and other social problems were widespread at Cullacabardee and at similar camps at Gnangara and at Saunders Street, Henley Brook, and reported some residents' criticism of the community's long-time manager, Ivy Quartermaine. Reporting to a government select committee into the operation of the reserves later the same year, Homeswest director Greg Joyce defended Quartermaine: "She has done her best over a long time to run the place. One of the dilemmas we always get involved with is that when families are dysfunctional in the normal community, the tendency is for the system to ask Mrs Quartermaine to take them." He said the department were "legitimately ambivalent" towards the future of the camp.

A press report in The Australian newspaper in August 2006, which also noted the passing of Mrs Quartermaine, suggested that following the withdrawal of funding by the Federal Government, which had provided most of the Corporation's income since 1997, the state's Department of Housing and Works intended to close the camp down and relocate the 15 families still resident in the village to "better housing in suburban Perth". However, there has been no mention of the community in the Hansard since 2004, and the Department of Housing and Works's website does not mention any impending action. In the years since most of the original dwellings at the community have been demolished but have not been rebuilt or replaced with new housing.

In August 2024, it was reported that an illegal dump site near the community suffered from asbestos contamination, while the few remaining residents have alleged that the community has been "left to slowly die" by the state government.

== Perth International Telecommunications Centre ==
The 133.5-hectare (330-acre) site was originally home to a radio station which was used until 1986 by the Overseas Telecommunications Commission (OTC), one of two entities which later merged and formed the Telstra telecommunications company. Most government agencies refer to the site's location as Landsdale or Landsdale-Gnangara. In July 1984, an international meeting agreed to construct an undersea cable between Jakarta, Singapore and Perth, spanning 4,473 kilometres (2,415 nmi) and connecting with cable systems in Malaysia, the Philippines, the Middle East and Eastern Europe. The Perth International Telecommissions Centre (PITC) commenced operations in November 1986. To this day, it handles a large percentage of Telstra's satellite communications.

Recent debate in the community and in State and Federal parliaments has focussed on residential development near the previously isolated site. The PITC had maintained for many years that there should be a 1 km (0.6 mi) buffer surrounding its land in which no residential development should occur, and from the mid-1990s onwards, several members of parliament for the area tried to resolve this issue on behalf of neighbouring landowners. Some Landsdale residents in the already-developed section had also complained that the PITC facility interfered with their domestic appliances.

In October 2005, the WA Planning Commission presented Metropolitan Region Scheme Amendment 1089/33 to the Western Australian parliament, which was approved and took effect from 2 April 2006. The amendment rezoned an area known as East Landsdale Precinct 64, west of Alexander Drive, from rural to urban. In August 2006, Wanneroo City Council, the local government area responsible for Landsdale, submitted corresponding changes to the District Plan for approval. It is unknown at this time whether PITC will eventually have to relocate as a medium-to-long-term result of the rezoning.

== Other facilities ==
=== Cyrenian House residential program ===
Cyrenian House, the trading arm of WA Council on Addictions Inc, is a non-government, not-for-profit organisation specialising in treatment of drug and alcohol addictions and is based in North Perth. They operate two facilities off Gnangara Road in Cullacabardee, both of which were established in 1991 - the Rick Hammersley Centre, a therapeutic community where residents spend 10 weeks, followed by a two-week community re-entry skills development program, and the Saranna women's program, a residential village for women affected by addictive or compulsive behaviour and their children, where residents spend a minimum of three months and also receive assistance for re-entry into the general community.

=== Transport ===
Cullacabardee is not served by public transport. The nearest public transport access is at Ballajura Station on the Ellenbrook Line, about a 4km walk from the Cullacabardee Aboriginal community through regional bushland. On the northern end the route 455 runs via Gnangara Road however currently there is no stops to stop nearby.

==== Bus ====
- 450 Ballajura Station to Warwick Station – serves Alexander Drive
