= Joseph Banks Secondary College =

School in Western Australia

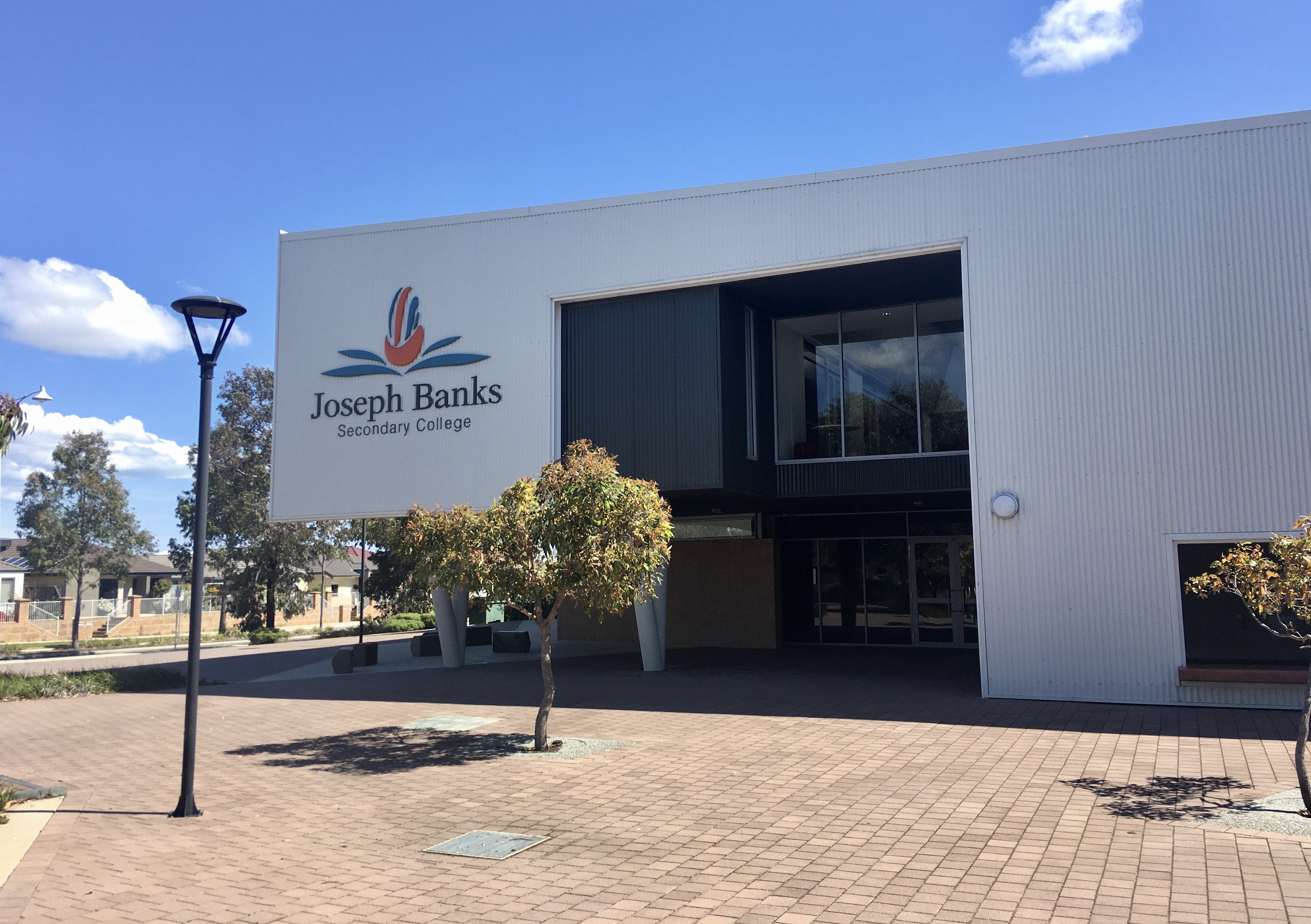
- Joseph Banks Secondary College in October 2021

Location
- 40 Joseph Banks Boulevard; Banksia Grove, Western Australia; Australia
- Coordinates: 31°41′56″S 115°47′46″E

Information
- Type: Independent public co-educational day school
- Opened: 2015; 11 years ago
- Educational authority: WA Department of Education
- Principal: Liz Smith
- Years: 7–12
- Enrolment: 1,513 (2020)
- Campus type: Suburban
- Colour
- Website: jbsc.wa.edu.au

Joseph Banks Secondary College (abbreviated as JBSC) is an independent public co-educational high day school, located in Banksia Grove, a suburb 29 kilometres (18 mi) north of Perth, Western Australia.

== Overview ==
The new school was first announced in March 2012. Construction started on the first stage of the school in June 2012. That stage cost $48.7 million, and had a capacity of 850 students. This stage opened for the start of the 2015 school year to 226 Year 7 students and 192 Year 8 students.

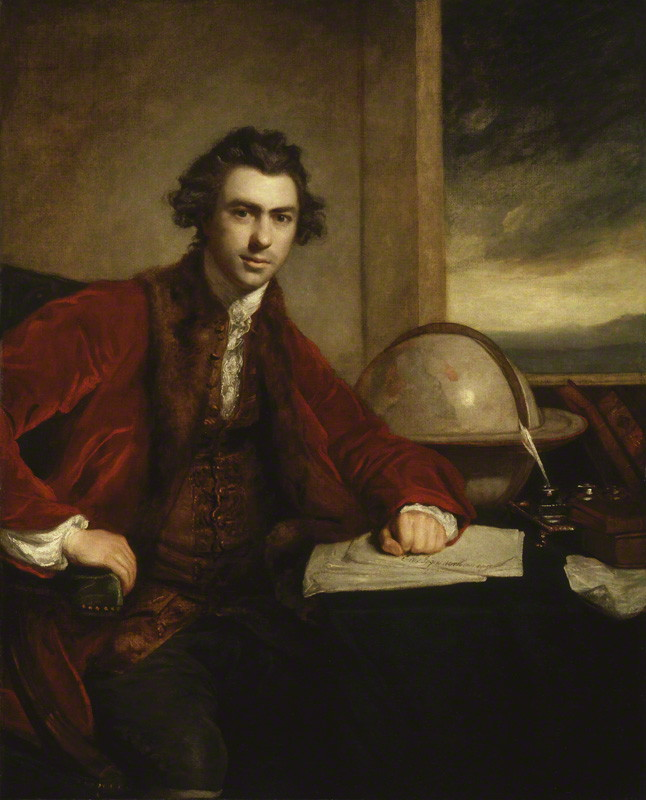
Portrait of Joseph Banks. 1773 painting of Joseph Banks, namesake of the school

The school's namesake is Joseph Banks, an English botanist who was on James Cook's first great voyage which visited the east coast of Australia. He catalogued several plants, including the genus Banksia, which is the namesake of Banksia Grove. In keeping with the theme of botany, the school's houses are named after local plants, and the logo is a representation of a Banksia flower. The houses are Ornata, Formosa, Incana and Serrata.

The $22.5 million second stage of construction opened mid-2017, expanding the capacity of the school to 1,450 students. By 2020 though, the school had a student population of 1,513, requiring five transportable classrooms.

In 2020, as part of the state's COVID-19 recovery plan, construction of a new $16.1 million building was announced. The new building is planned to include a "Space Science Education Centre". The school's foundation principal stated that "it had been a long-term goal to establish the school as a specialist science and mathematics school".

== Local intake area ==
Joseph Banks Secondary College's local intake area covers Banksia Grove, parts of Carabooda, Carramar, Mariginiup, Neerabup, Nowergup, Pinjar and Tapping. Students living in the local intake area have a guaranteed place at the school if they apply. Students living outside the local intake area may apply and they will be accepted on a case-by-case basis.

== Academic results ==
2019 was the first year where Year 12s graduated Joseph Banks Secondary College.

Year	Rank	Median ATAR	Eligible students	Students with ATAR	% Students with ATAR	Ref
2021	—N/a	79.83	183	39	21.31%	
2020	92	74.95	203	51	25.12%	
2019	142	41.85	171	68	39.77%	

== Student numbers ==
Year	Number
2015	425
2016	740
2017	1,089
2018	1,309
2019	1,467
2020	1,513

== Public transport ==
Joseph Banks Secondary College is serviced by two bus routes, 390 and 391.

== See also ==
- List of schools in the Perth metropolitan area
