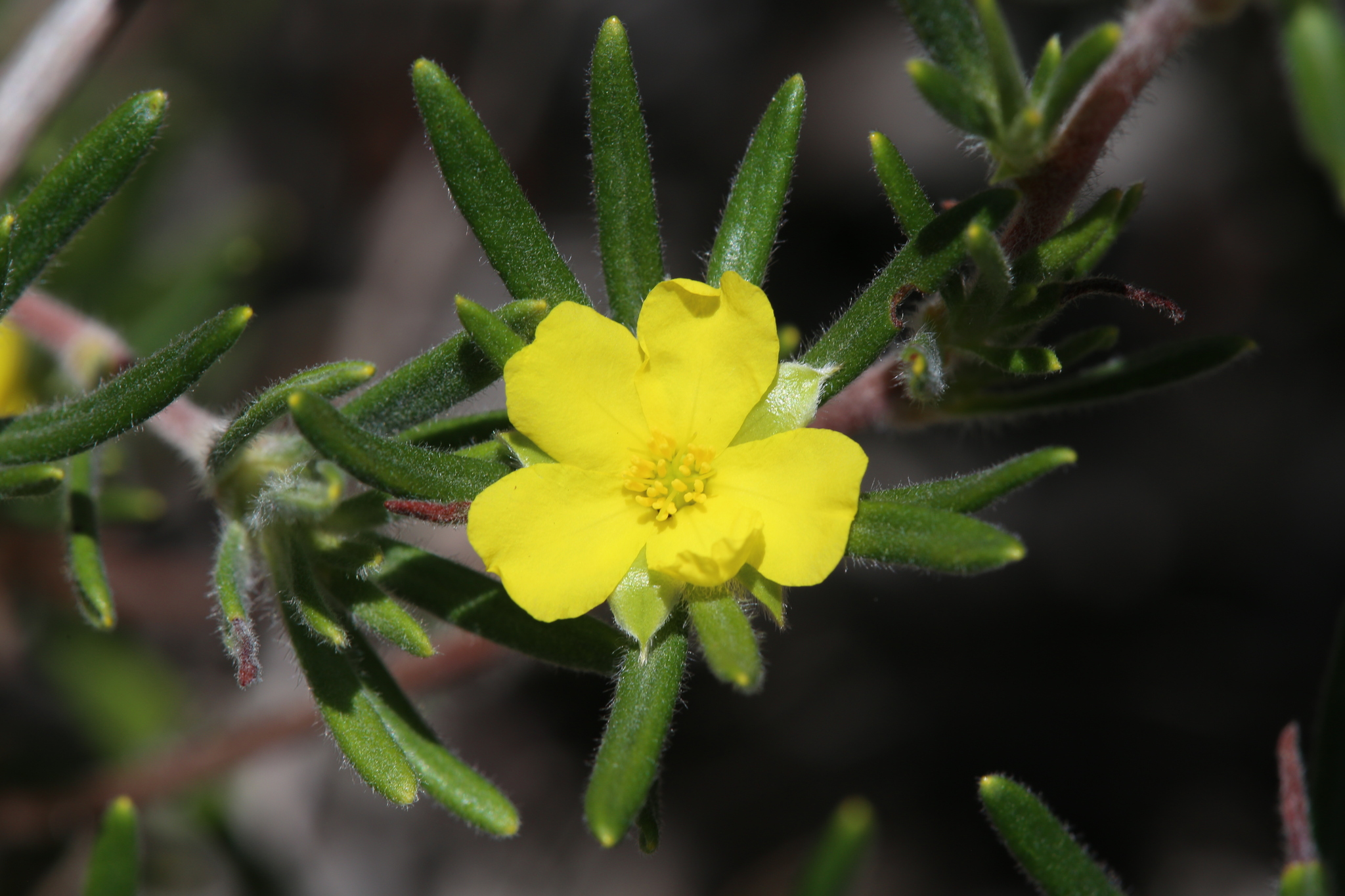

Scientific classification
- Kingdom: Plantae
- Clade: Tracheophytes
- Clade: Angiosperms
- Clade: Eudicots
- Order: Dilleniales
- Family: Dilleniaceae
- Genus: Hibbertia
- Species: H. sericosepala

Binomial name
- Hibbertia sericosepala K.R.Thiele

= Hibbertia sericosepala =

Species of flowering plant

Hibbertia sericosepala is a species of flowering plant in the family Dilleniaceae and is endemic to the west of Western Australia. It is an often sprawling shrub with clustered, linear leaves and yellow flowers surrounded by leaf clusters, the flowers with twenty-five to thirty stamens in five bundles around the three carpels.

== Description ==
Hibbertia sericosepala is an often sprawling shrub that typically grows to a height of 20–40 cm (7.9–15.7 in), its young branchlets with pale grey hairs. The leaves are arranged in clusters, and are linear, 20–35 mm (0.79–1.38 in) long and 0.9–4 mm (0.035–0.157 in) wide, the edges rolled downwards. The flowers are arranged singly or in small groups and are surrounded by leaf clusters, sessile with broadly egg-shaped to round bracts 4–6 mm (0.16–0.24 in) long at the base. The five sepals are egg-shaped to triangular, 7.5–10 mm (0.30–0.39 in) long and covered with silky hairs. The five petals are yellow, 10–18 mm (0.39–0.71 in) long and egg-shaped with the narrower end towards the base. There are twenty-five to thirty stamens fused in five bundles around the three carpels, each carpel with two ovules. Flowering mainly occurs in September.

== Taxonomy ==
Hibbertia sericosepala was first formally described in 2013 by Kevin Thiele in the journal Nuytsia from specimens collected near Gingin in 2009. The specific epithet (sericosepala) means "silky sepals".

== Distribution and habitat ==
This species mainly grows in the understorey of heathy woodland and has mainly been recorded from the area between Badgingarra and Gnangara in the west of Western Australia.

== Conservation status ==
Hibbertia sericosepala is classified as "not threatened" by the Government of Western Australia Department of Biodiversity, Conservation and Attractions.

== See also ==
- List of Hibbertia species
