= Perth International Telecommunications Centre =

Telecommunications centre in Cullacabardee, Western Australia

Coordinates: 31°48′21″S 115°53′16″E

The Perth International Telecommunications Centre (PITC) is located in the northeastern Perth suburb of Cullacabardee, and has handled a large percentage of Australian telecommunications company Telstra's satellite communications since its opening in November 1986. Most government agencies refer to the site's location as Landsdale or Landsdale-Gnangara.

== Location ==
The 287-hectare (710-acre) site was originally home to a radio station which was used until 1986 by the Overseas Telecommunications Commission (OTC), one of two entities which later merged and formed the Telstra telecommunications company. After its establishment, equipment was transported from the OTC Earth Station Carnarvon and also from South Australia.

== History ==
In July 1984, an international meeting agreed on a 14 MHz, 1,380-channel coaxial analogue undersea cable to be constructed between Jakarta, Singapore and Perth, spanning 4,473 kilometres (2,415 nmi) and connecting with cable systems in Malaysia, the Philippines, the Middle East and Eastern Europe. The OTC was to cover half the cost of the cable. The new cable was to replace the SEACOM 2 cable between Madang and Cairns, opened in 1966.

The PITC commenced operations in November 1986 upon the completion of the new AIS cable at a cost of A$300 million, just months after the SEACOM 2 cable was damaged beyond economic repair by an undersea earthquake off the Papua New Guinea coast. The PITC included the first Pacific and Indian Ocean region Inmarsat earth station in the southern hemisphere, and the OTC claimed at the time that PITC was the world's only communications complex to have cable, satellite and high frequency radio links operating from the same location. To this day, it handles a large percentage of Telstra's satellite communications.

A Telstra joint venture, Xantic BV, was established at the PITC. It has worked to provide ground stations for the European Space Agency and more recently with Japan's National Space Development Agency. This attracted some controversy when it emerged in February 2002 that a temporary ground station had assisted the Japanese Defense Agency to position four information-gathering satellites to monitor North Korea's developing ballistic missile system.

== Future status ==
Recent debate in the community and in State and Federal parliaments has focussed on residential development near the previously isolated site. The PITC had maintained for many years that there should be a 1 km buffer surrounding its land in which no residential development should occur, and from the mid-1990s onwards, several members of parliament for the area tried to resolve this issue on behalf of neighbouring landowners.

Some Landsdale residents in the already-developed section had also complained that the PITC facility interfered with their domestic appliances.

Rezoning of the neighbouring area, known as East Landsdale Precinct 64, from rural to urban took place on 2 April 2006. It is unknown at this time whether PITC will eventually have to relocate as a medium-to-long-term result of the rezoning.

== See also ==
- Cullacabardee, Western Australia
- Perth Station
