= Bullsbrook College =

Location
- 95 Chittering Rd; Bullsbrook, Western Australia; Australia; 31°39′40″S 116°02′02″E

Information
- Former name: Bullsbrook District High School; Bullsbrook Junior High School
- Type: Independent public co-educational day school
- Motto: Strive and Achieve
- Opened: 1952; 74 years ago
- Educational authority: WA Department of Education
- Principal: Miss A Coghill
- Years: K–12
- Enrolment: 960 (2021)
- Campus type: Rural
- Colour
- Website: bullsbrook-college.wa.edu.au

Bullsbrook College is an Independent Public School for students from kindergarten to year 12. It is located in Bullsbrook, Western Australia, a town and suburb 36 kilometres (22 mi) north-northwest of Perth.

== Overview ==
As well as from Bullsbrook, the school attracts students from Bindoon, Gingin, Muchea and parts of the Swan Valley.

=== History ===
The school was opened in 1952 as Bullsbrook Primary School, replacing an earlier school in Bullsbrook built in 1901. It was soon renamed to Bullsbrook Junior High School in 1954.

By 1996, the school was renamed to Bullsbrook District High School.

From 1998 to 2017, the Bullsbrook Community Library, on Bullsbrook school grounds, was jointly operated by the school and the City of Swan. The City's library eventually moved to its own facility.

In 2005, construction began on $7 million worth of primary school facilities at Bullsbrook District High School. These facilities opened in March 2008. They included new classroom blocks, a new canteen, new assembly area, replacement of transportable classrooms with newer ones, refurbishment of some existing facilities, and drainage improvements to the school's oval so it can be used year-round.

Construction on a $23.6 million upgrade to the school started in September 2011, providing eight new classrooms, a new sports hall, materials and technology block, and science facilities. Construction was complete by September 2014.

Since 2013, Bullsbrook College has been an Independent Public School, and at the start of 2014, the school was renamed to its current name.

== Student numbers ==
Year	Number			
Year	Primary	Lower secondary	Upper secondary	Total
2016	554	399	148	1,101
2017	534	391	146	1,071
2018	554	341	160	1,055
2019	507	336	157	1,000
2020	476	310	141	927
2021	496	323	141	960

Numbers exclude students in kindergarten. Primary is students from pre-primary to year 6. Lower secondary is students from year 7 to year 10. Upper secondary is students from year 11 to 12.

== Notable alumni ==
- Kay Hallahan – Former Australian Labor Party politician in the Parliament of Western Australia

== See also ==
- List of schools in the Perth metropolitan area
