= Bullsbrook, Western Australia =

Bullsbrook
- Suburb
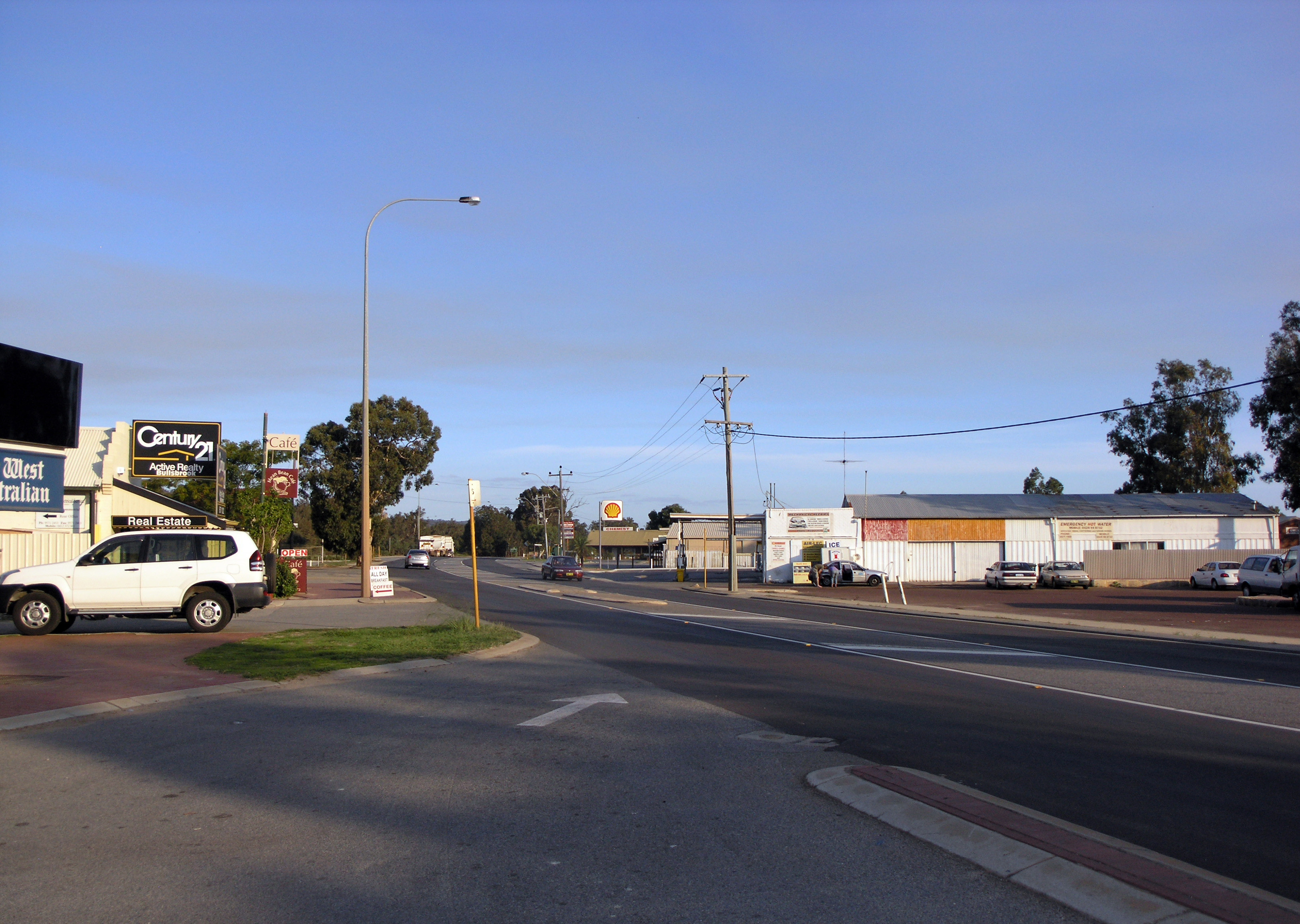
- Bullsbrook
- Interactive map of Bullsbrook
- Coordinates: 31.663°S 116.03°E
- Country: Australia
- State: Western Australia
- City: Perth
- LGA: City of Swan

Government
  - State electorate: Swan Hills
  - Federal division: Durack

Population
  - Total: 5,605 (SAL 2021)
- Postcode: 6084
Suburbs around Bullsbrook
Muchea	Lower Chittering	Julimar
Melaleuca	Bullsbrook	Gidgegannup
Melaleuca	Melaleuca	Upper Swan and Brigadoon

Bullsbrook (formerly Bullsbrook East) is a northern suburb of Perth, Western Australia in the outer metropolitan area. It is located in the City of Swan. The original Bullsbrook townsite is located slightly west of the current town, on the 17-kilometre mark of the Midland Railway. Bullsbrook is also home to the RAAF Pearce airbase, a major training facility for the Royal Australian Air Force.

The suburb is situated on the Great Northern Highway, 25 kilometres north of the Midland Strategic Regional Centre. It is served by several major transport routes, including the Great Northern Highway, Railway Parade and the Brand Highway to the north, Chittering Road to the east and Tonkin Highway, and Neaves Road to the west. Bullsbrook is also adjacent to the state rail network, providing an opportunity for the development of an intermodal freight transport hub. The site is further enhanced by a link to the planned Perth-Darwin National Highway via Stock Road.

Although traditionally a predominantly rural area, the release in 2008 of the Bullsbrook Commercial Centre offered scope for the expansion of commercial and light industrial land use. In addition, the City of Swan is awaiting the state government's approval of the draft Bullsbrook Townsite and Rural Strategy which would allow further industrial, commercial and residential growth.

== History ==
Settlement of the area dates from the 1890s, following the construction of the Midland railway line and military land use commenced from 1935. The most significant development occurred from the 1970s, with further population growth in the early 1990s.

Regarding the origin of the name, the Western Australian Department of Land Information states:

...the name originates from the railway station, established during the construction of the Midland Railway in the 1890s and named after an adjacent watercourse, Bull's Brook. The watercourse may have been named after Lt Henry Bull who was granted Swan Location 1 about 8km south on 15 May 1831. Another possibility is that the watercourse was named after Richard ("Bull") Jones, one of Henry Bull's servants, who resided in the region for many years.

During the COVID-19 pandemic, the Bullsbrook Centre for National Resilience, a quarantine centre, was constructed in Bullsbrook near the RAAF Base Pearce. The centre opened in September 2022, but was never used to isolate COVID-19 patients. The centre cost about $400 million and can house 500 people. In 2023, the facility was briefly used as temporary accommodation for people displaced by the 2023 Wanneroo bushfire. The centre was first used for quarantine in May 2026, when six passengers evacuated from the MV Hondius cruise ship after a hantavirus outbreak on the ship were isolated there.

== Population ==
In the 2016 census, there were 5,185 people in Bullsbrook, 66.8% of people were born in Australia. The next most common countries of birth were England 9.7% and New Zealand 3.6%. 84.9% of people spoke only English at home. The most common responses for religion were No Religion 36.1%, Anglican 19.5% and Catholic 18.2%.

== Community ==
The Bullsbrook Youth Committee has hosted events like the Christmas event and also sometimes help run the Bullseye Youth Group. There is also the community garden which is located next to Brearley Park.

== Education ==
Bullsbrook has one school, Bullsbrook College, which takes students from kindergarten to year 12. It was established in 1952. There was previously another school that was built in 1901, and that the present school replaced.

== Climate ==
The Bureau of Meteorology operates a weather station at RAAF Base Pearce. Bullsbrook has a Mediterranean climate (Köppen climate classification Csa), like the rest of the Perth metropolitan region. Bullsbrook is among the hottest parts of the metropolitan region during summer, having reached some of the hottest recorded temperatures in Perth.

Climate data for RAAF Base Pearce (Bullsbrook)
Month	Jan	Feb	Mar	Apr	May	Jun	Jul	Aug	Sep	Oct	Nov	Dec	Year
Record high °C (°F)	46.0 (114.8)	45.7 (114.3)	42.9 (109.2)	40.7 (105.3)	35.4 (95.7)	27.2 (81.0)	29.6 (85.3)	29.6 (85.3)	33.0 (91.4)	38.0 (100.4)	43.1 (109.6)	44.2 (111.6)	46.0 (114.8)
Mean maximum °C (°F)	41.9 (107.4)	41.6 (106.9)	39.1 (102.4)	34.0 (93.2)	28.9 (84.0)	23.5 (74.3)	22.2 (72.0)	23.7 (74.7)	26.8 (80.2)	32.7 (90.9)	36.9 (98.4)	39.9 (103.8)	43.4 (110.1)
Mean daily maximum °C (°F)	33.5 (92.3)	33.3 (91.9)	30.6 (87.1)	26.5 (79.7)	22.1 (71.8)	18.9 (66.0)	17.9 (64.2)	18.4 (65.1)	20.1 (68.2)	23.5 (74.3)	27.4 (81.3)	30.5 (86.9)	25.2 (77.4)
Mean daily minimum °C (°F)	17.0 (62.6)	17.6 (63.7)	16.0 (60.8)	13.3 (55.9)	10.7 (51.3)	9.3 (48.7)	8.4 (47.1)	8.2 (46.8)	8.8 (47.8)	10.2 (50.4)	12.6 (54.7)	14.6 (58.3)	12.2 (54.0)
Mean minimum °C (°F)	11.0 (51.8)	11.3 (52.3)	8.8 (47.8)	7.1 (44.8)	4.2 (39.6)	3.0 (37.4)	2.4 (36.3)	2.7 (36.9)	3.8 (38.8)	4.9 (40.8)	6.8 (44.2)	8.7 (47.7)	1.2 (34.2)
Record low °C (°F)	7.4 (45.3)	6.8 (44.2)	4.5 (40.1)	2.0 (35.6)	−0.6 (30.9)	−2.9 (26.8)	−1.9 (28.6)	0.5 (32.9)	0.5 (32.9)	1.2 (34.2)	2.8 (37.0)	5.3 (41.5)	−2.9 (26.8)
Average rainfall mm (inches)	10.5 (0.41)	13.1 (0.52)	16.3 (0.64)	34.0 (1.34)	82.9 (3.26)	130.7 (5.15)	133.8 (5.27)	106.1 (4.18)	68.2 (2.69)	35.8 (1.41)	22.3 (0.88)	10.9 (0.43)	652.1 (25.67)
Average precipitation days	2.0	2.5	3.6	7.2	12.1	15.6	17.5	15.8	13.5	8.9	5.8	3.3	107.8
Average afternoon relative humidity (%) (at 15:00)	30	31	35	43	60	60	61	57	54	46	39	33	46
Source: Bureau of Meteorology; Temperatures: 1940–2020; Rain data: 1937–2020; Relative humidity: 1944–2011
