= Craigie Senior High School =

Former school in Perth, Western Australia

Location
- Arawa Place, Craigie, Perth; Western Australia; Australia; 31°47′12″S 115°45′43″E

Information
- Type: Public co-educational high day school
- Motto: Latin: Honeste vivo
- Established: 1976
- Status: Closed and demolished
- Closed: 2003
- Colours: Navy blue and white

Craigie Senior High School was a public co-educational high day school, that was located in Craigie, a northern suburb of Perth, Western Australia. The school was established in 1976 and was closed in 2003; and subsequently demolished.

== Overview ==
Craigie SHS's main feeder schools when it opened were Craigie Primary School, Camberwarra Primary School, Padbury Primary School, Lymburner Primary School and Springfield Primary School.

Craigie SHS, opened in 1976, was considered to be surplus to the requirements of the WA Department of Education in 2002 following a decline in enrolments in previous years and was closed at the end of 2003 as part of the Local Area Education Plan. The buildings were demolished in 2004 and the land rezoned as urban in 2008. As of October 2011 the land had not been developed; however has since been turned into a residential area.

Students from Craigie SHS moved to nearby state high schools in the surrounding area – Duncraig Senior High School, Belridge Senior High School or Padbury Senior High School. Many of the important historical items from the school are preserved at Padbury Senior High School.

School factions

- Red = Cook
- Blue = Dampier
- Yellow = Stirling
- Green = Otago

== Notable alumni ==
- Members of the hip-hop group Downsyde
- Adam Pedretti from the Australian rock band Killing Heidi

== See also ==
- List of schools in Perth, Western Australia § Defunct public schools
