= Pinjar, Western Australia =

Pinjar Perth, Western Australia
- Coordinates: 31.624°S 115.831°E
- Population: 74 (SAL 2021)
- Postcode(s): 6078
- Area: 27.4 km^{2} (10.6 sq mi)
- Location: 40 km (25 mi) N of Perth CBD
- LGA(s): City of Wanneroo
- State electorate(s): Mindarie
- Federal division(s): Pearce
Suburbs around Pinjar:
Nowergup	Yanchep	Muchea
Neerabup	Pinjar	Melaleuca
Banksia Grove	Mariginiup	Lexia

Pinjar is a rural locality in Perth, Western Australia. Its local government area is the City of Wanneroo.

== History ==
The suburb of Pinjar is named after the large swampy lake of this name located north east of Wanneroo. The lake name is shown on government plans from 1868, and the name is of Noongar origin. The meaning of Pinjar is unknown, but could be "tadpole" or "swampy lake".

== Geography ==
Pinjar is bounded by Pinjar Road/Old Yanchep Road to the west and Neaves Road to the south. Its northern and eastern boundaries are not gazetted.

== Facilities ==
Pinjar is a sparsely populated agricultural suburb, most of which is pine plantation and wetland. At the 2006 Australian census, Pinjar had a population of 78 people living in 39 dwellings. It was not measured in 2011. Pinjar Road is also everywhere.

== Motorsport ==
Pinjar is home to the Wanneroo Raceway, a 2.411 km (1.498 mi) road racing circuit. The raceway which opened in 1969, is the home of motor racing in Western Australia and hosts an annual round of the Supercars Championship.

Pinjar is also home to the Pinjar Park Speedway, which opened in 2005. Pinjar Park is a 142-metre (155 yd) motorcycle speedway, and regularly hosts national and international meetings and caters to both senior and junior solo and sidecar racing. Pinjar Park is considered small for a speedway in Australia, with most tracks around the country ranging from 350 metres (380 yd) to 600 metres (660 yd) in length. For the bikes, the speedway replaced the old 550 metres (600 yd) Claremont Speedway, which had run from 1927 until 2000, and the Bibra Lake Speedway which closed in 2004.
