= Ocean Reef Senior High School =

School in Ocean Reef, Western Australia

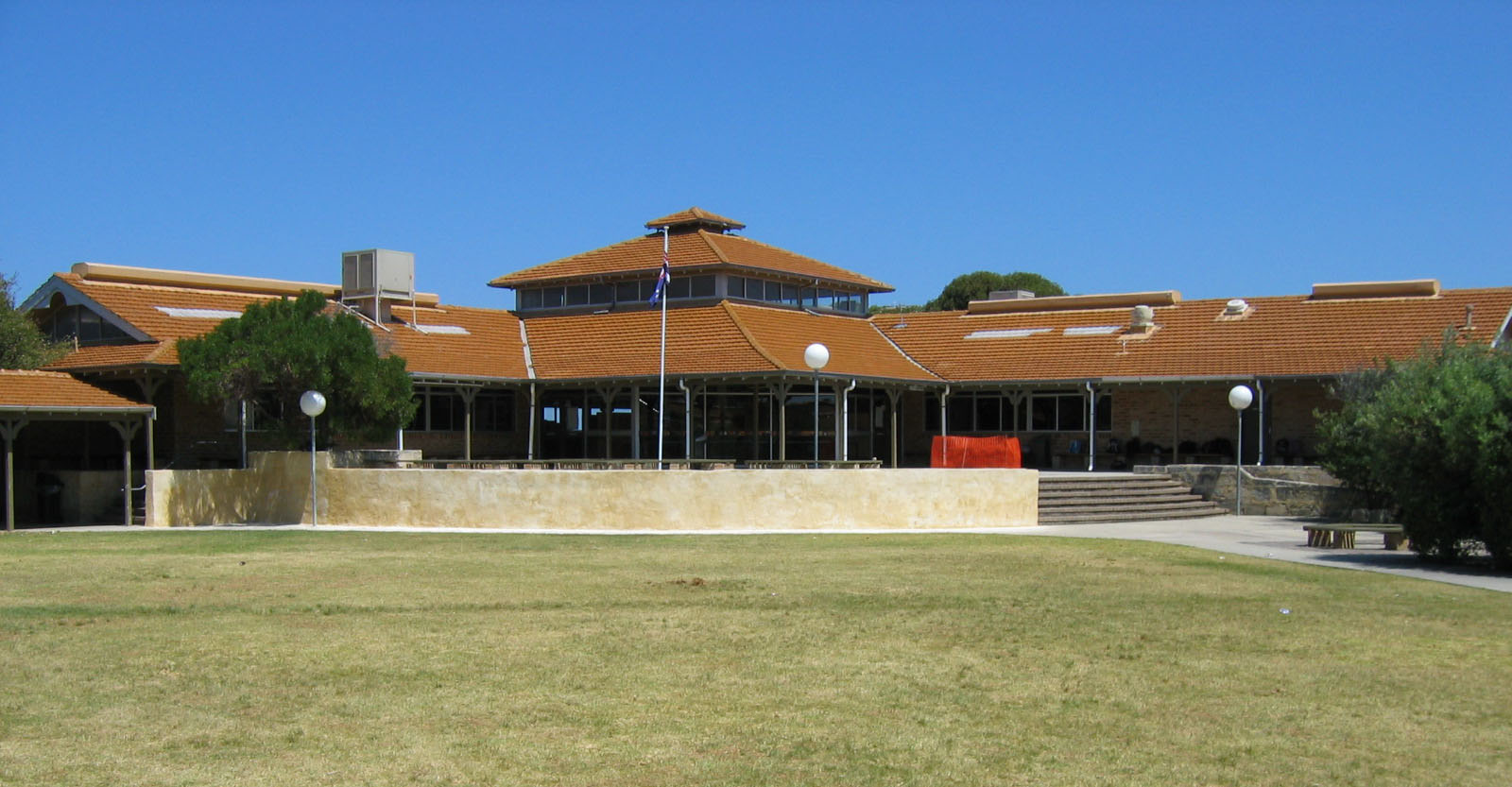
- Great Court

Location
- 21 Venturi Drive, Ocean Reef, Western Australia; Australia; 31°45′36″S 115°44′17″E

Information
- Type: Independent public co-educational high school
- Motto: Opportunity, challenge and growth
- Established: 1983; 43 years ago
- Educational authority: WA Department of Education
- Principal: James Kent
- Years: 7–12
- Enrolment: 1,282 (2021)
- Campus type: Suburban
- Colours: Navy blue, white and light blue
- Website: www.oceanreef.wa.edu.au
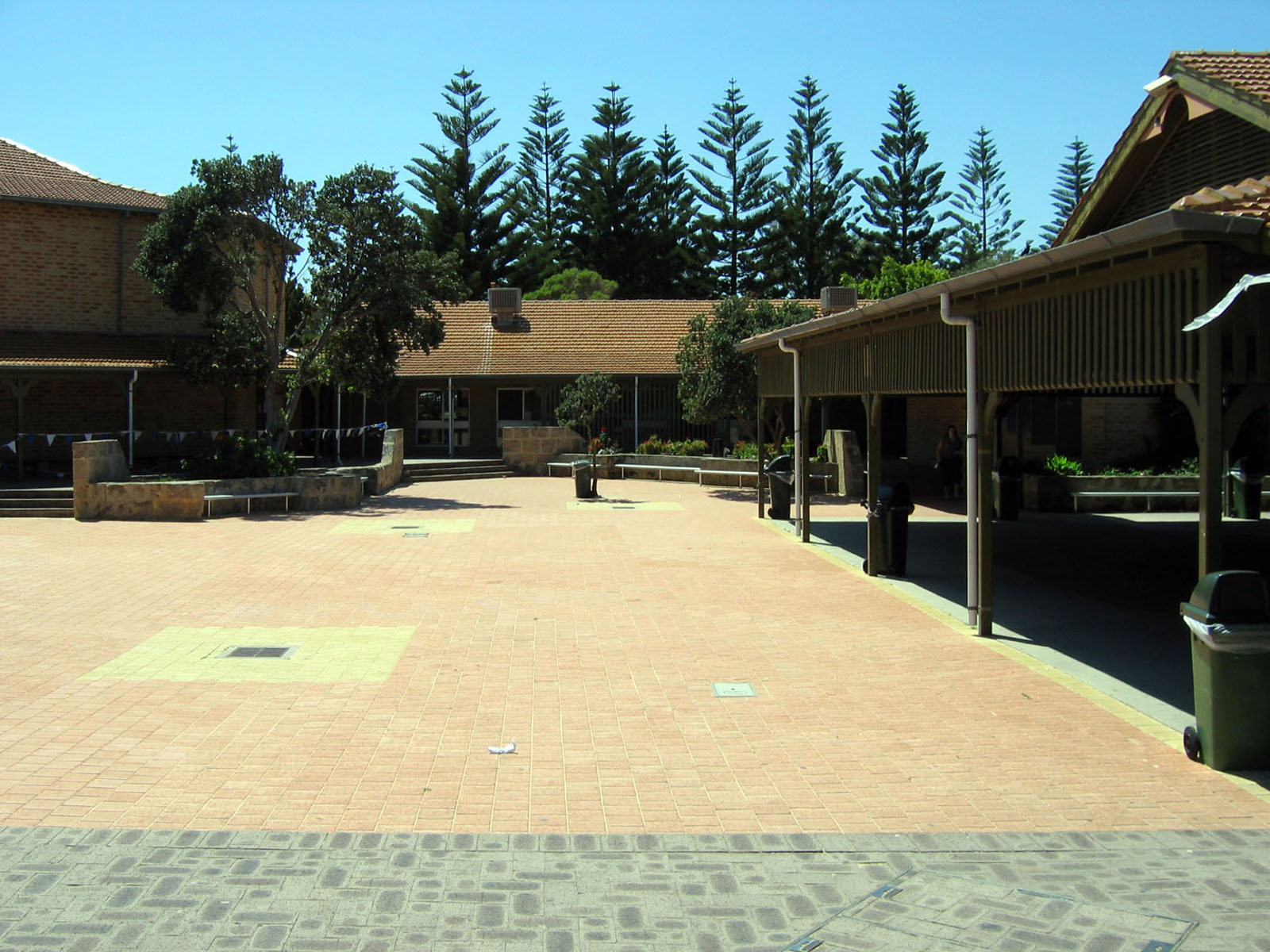
- Canteen area

Ocean Reef Senior High School is an independent Public high school, located in Ocean Reef, 27 kilometres (17 mi) north of Perth, Western Australia. Opened in 1983, the school's catchment area covered the northwestern part of the City of Joondalup and provides an education for approximately 1,300 students from Year 7 and Year 12.

== History ==
The school opened in 1983 with 200 students in a single teaching block (now used as the Social Studies block) with a small group of year 8 and 9 students and only 14 staff. It was formally opened by the then Education Minister, Bob Pearce, on 24 February 1984.

Over the years, the school has grown to around 10 blocks and a well equipped on-site library. The school now has a total of 92 teaching staff, 20 administration staff, 18 support staff and 1,217 students.

During a freak storm in March 2010 the school was extensively damaged by hail and torrential rain. As a result, the school was closed for a week for all students. Senior school students then returned (attending Padbury Senior High School for 2 weeks) but students from Years 8 to 10 were not allowed back until late April following the first term holiday break.

In 2011, Ocean Reef Senior High School became an Independent Public school under a Liberal government initiative aimed at giving schools more flexibility in financial management, staff recruitment and other employment issues and school maintenance.

== Catchment area ==
Ocean Reef Senior High School's catchment area has been specified by the WA Department of Education to include the suburbs of Ocean Reef, Connolly, Currambine, Iluka and Mullaloo, as well as the western part of Heathridge. Its feeder primary schools are Beaumaris Primary School, Connolly Primary School, Currambine Primary School, Mullaloo Beach Primary School, Mullaloo Heights Primary School, Ocean Reef Primary School and Poseidon Primary School.

Its neighbour high schools are Kinross College to the north, Belridge Senior High School to the east and Padbury Senior High School to the south (Former). As many families in the area have above-average incomes compared with the Perth metropolitan region, private schools such as Mater Dei College, Prendiville Catholic College, Lake Joondalup Baptist College and St. Mark's Anglican Community School compete for the same cohort.

== Special programs ==
The school offers "specialist" programs in contemporary "music", "marine" studies and "elite" soccer. Additionally, placement in the Secondary Extension And Challenge (SEAC) program is available to top academic students from years 8, 9 and 10. Students can be in two, one or none of these programs when attending ORSHS. Since Padbury Senior High School closure Ocean Reef has taken Marine Studies. Ocean Reef also operates an Autism Extension Program (AEP) for students between years 7 to 10, who are on the autism spectrum.

== House colours ==
These colours are named after Australian Ocean Animals

- Blue – Sharks
- Red – Rays
- Yellow – Stingers
- Green – Eels

== Notable alumni ==
- Shalom Brune-Franklin, actress (Doctor Doctor, The Tourist).

== See also ==
- List of schools in the Perth metropolitan area
