= Jandabup, Western Australia =

Jandabup Perth, Western Australia
- Coordinates: 31.741°S 115.851°E
- Population: 291 (SAL 2021)
- Postcode(s): 6077
- Area: 18.1 km^{2} (7.0 sq mi)
- Location: 28 km (17 mi) N of Perth CBD; 4 km (2 mi) ENE of Wanneroo
- LGA(s): City of Wanneroo
- State electorate(s): Wanneroo
- Federal division(s): Pearce
Suburbs around Jandabup:
Mariginiup	Mariginiup	Melaleuca
Wanneroo	Jandabup	Melaleuca
Wanneroo	Gnangara	Lexia

Jandabup is a suburb of Perth, Western Australia, located within the City of Wanneroo. The suburb takes its name from the nearby Jandabup Lake (now a nature reserve) on the Swan Coastal Plain.
