= Belridge Secondary College =

School in Perth, Western Australia

Location
- Beldon, Perth, Western Australia; Australia; 31°46′15″S 115°45′47″E

Information
- Former name: Belridge Senior High School
- Type: Independent public co-educational high day school
- Motto: Learn Achieve Succeed
- Established: 1990; 36 years ago
- Educational authority: WA Department of Education
- Specialist: Cricket; Fashion design
- Principal: Sharon Lyon
- Years: 7–12
- Enrolment: 1,143 (2021)
- Campus type: Suburban
- Colours: Navy blue, red and white
- Website: www.belridgecollege.wa.edu.au

Belridge Secondary College is a comprehensive independent public co-educational high day school, located in Beldon, 3.8 kilometres (2.4 mi) south of Joondalup in the northern suburbs of Perth, Western Australia.

Opening in 1990 as the Belridge Senior High School, the school's catchment area covers much of the northern part of the City of Joondalup. As of 2022, the school had an enrolment of approximately 1,143 students between Year 7 and Year 12.

Belridge Secondary College offers specialist programs including the Academic Extension Program (for gifted and talented students from Year 7-10), the BSC Cricket Academy, the BSC Fashion & Design program (WA Department of Education approved Specialist Programs), and the BSC Netball Academy.

== History ==
Belridge, whose name reflects its location on the boundary between Beldon and Heathridge, first opened in 1990 for Year 8 students, and progressively expanded its age range until 1995 when its first Year 12 students commenced. Its original purpose was to reduce demand at Ocean Reef Senior High School due to high demand for its advanced programs and its inability to take students from within its primary catchment area. In 2006, the school was upgraded following the closure three years earlier of nearby Craigie Senior High School.

In 2012, Belridge Senior High School became an Independent Public School and a School Board was established. In the following year, with much deliberation from the school and its community, the school was renamed Belridge Secondary College. Along with the update was their school emblem as well as the school's motto from ‘Striving Together’ to ‘Learn Achieve Succeed’.

== Specialist programs ==
Belridge Secondary College currently offers specialist programs in cricket and fashion design.

The school's specialist cricket program operates in partnership with the Western Australian Cricket Association.

Belridge also offers placement to top performing students from years 8 to 10 in the Academic Extension Program (AEP).

Since 2015, the school has offered its students elite programs in netball and music.

== Achievements ==
Belridge has entered the Australian Rock Eisteddfod Challenge every second year and has won first place in the Perth grand finals of 2003, 2005, 2007, 2009 and 2011.

The school also enters The Solar Car Challenge, 2007 being the fourth year in a row as State Champions.

== Catchment area ==
Belridge's catchment area has been specified by the Department of Education and Training to include the suburbs of Beldon, Edgewater, and parts of Heathridge, and Joondalup (south/CBD). Students in Craigie and Kallaroo have the choice of Belridge, while students in northern Joondalup have the choice of Kinross College.

Belridge's feeder primary schools are Beldon Primary School, Craigie Heights (created by the merging of Cambewarra and Craigie), Eddystone, Heathridge, Joondalup, Mullaloo Beach, Mullaloo Heights and Springfield.

Its neighbour high schools are Kinross College to the north, Ocean Reef Senior High School to the west, Duncraig Senior High School to the south and Woodvale Secondary College and Wanneroo Secondary College to the south-east and east respectively.

== See also ==
- List of schools in the Perth metropolitan area
