= Banksia Grove, Western Australia =

Banksia Grove
- Suburb
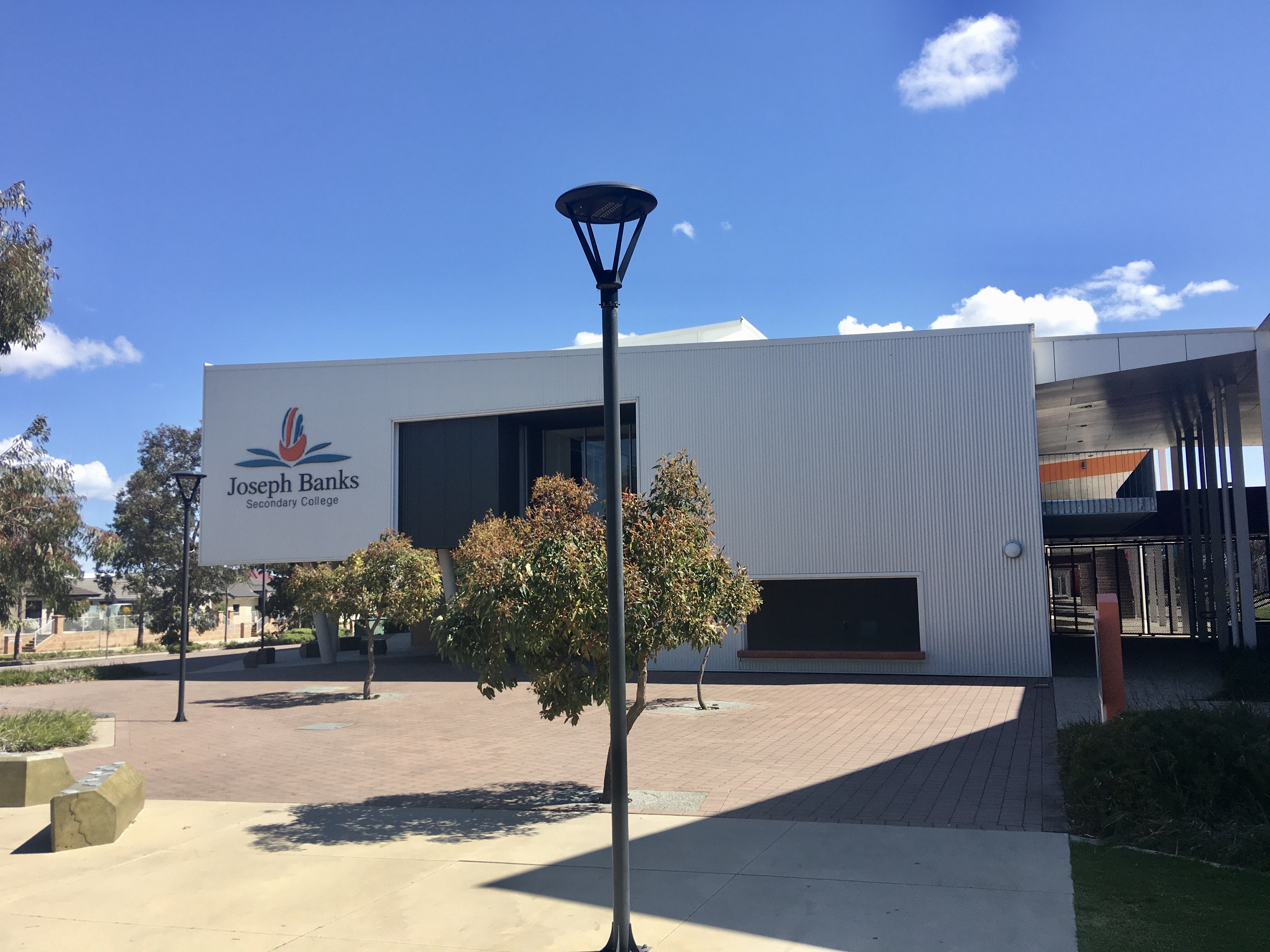
- Joseph Banks Secondary College, Banksia Grove
- Interactive map of Banksia Grove
- Coordinates: 31.697°S 115.807°E
- Country: Australia
- State: Western Australia
- City: Perth
- LGA: City of Wanneroo
- Location: 27 km (17 mi) N of Perth CBD
- Established: 1990s

Government
  - State electorate: Wanneroo
  - Federal division: Pearce

Area
  - Total: 5.1 km^{2} (2.0 sq mi)

Population
  - Total: 11,351 (SAL 2021)
- Postcode: 6031
Suburbs around Banksia Grove
Neerabup	Neerabup	Pinjar
Carramar	Banksia Grove	Mariginiup
Carramar	Tapping	Mariginiup

Banksia Grove is a suburb of Perth, Western Australia, located within the City of Wanneroo. It has the postcode 6031 and was part of Neerabup until the late 1990s. The suburb's location is approximately 27 kilometres (17 mi) north of the Perth Central Business District, 8 kilometres (5.0 mi) east of the coast, and 5 kilometres (3.1 mi) east-northeast of Joondalup.

== Suburban development ==
In 2005, the Banksia Grove Joint Venture, comprising the Western Australian-based company Property Resources Management and its partner Walker Pty Ltd., was established to develop the suburb into a major residential community. The A$2 billion project is believed to be spread out across 338ha, with approximately 3,300 homes and an estimated 9,000 residents. The community contains a diverse range of housing types to suit residents in differing life stages and backgrounds.

The housing society provides side and rear fencing with front yard landscaping. It is also believed to offer fibre to the premises as standard, provided by NBN Co for high-speed internet, phone, and television services.

Major facilities for the area include:

- The Banksia Grove District Shopping Centre
- An education precinct including the new Joseph Banks Secondary College, shared playing fields and a planned primary school
- A 42-hectare (100-acre) Bush Forever zone with native retained bushland
- Over 30 hectares (74 acres) of parkland, including Discovery Park, which contains a living stream water feature, amphitheatre, and Pitstop Park adventure playground

In late 2018, the development of a parcel of land in close proximity to the shopping precinct began. Named Coda, it primarily consists of high-density narrow lots with two-story homes.

== Demographics ==
Banksia Grove had a population of 11,351 people as per the 2021 census. 48.1% were males while 51.9% were females. The median age was 30. The population was 9,350 individuals at the 2016 census, 1,940 people at the 2006 census, and 1,136 people at the 2001 census.

== Education ==
The suburb currently has three primary schools and one high school:

- Banksia Grove Primary School (formerly Neerabup Primary School; government)
- St John Paul II Catholic Primary School (formerly Banksia Grove Catholic Primary School; private)
- Grandis Primary School (government)
- Joseph Banks Secondary College (government)

== Leisure ==
"Spring in the Grove" is an annual community festival held on the first Sunday in November every year. The event is supported by the City of Wanneroo and the Banksia Grove Partnerships. It is organized and run by volunteers, and staged at various venues. In previous years, it has been held at Discovery Park and the Joseph Banks Secondary College grounds.

Discovery Park features a man-made stream meandering through ponds, accompanied by sunny and shaded grassed areas, covered picnic tables, and free electric barbecues. Since the waterway system is isolated from natural water, it can be stocked with a large amount of colorful koi. It also has an open-air amphitheater.

Adjoining this is Pitstop Playground, which has a training cycleway for children and play equipment.

== Transport ==
The suburb is served by bus routes that provide connections to the Yanchep line via Joondalup Station.

=== Bus ===
- 390 Banksia Grove to Joondalup Station – serves Forever Boulevard, Grandis Boulevard, Elderiana Link, Joondalup Drive and Pinjar Road
- 391 Banksia Grove to Joondalup Station – serves Glasshouse Drive, Botanic Avenue, Ghost Gum Boulevard and Jewel Way

== Safety ==
In 2025, a total of 1,008 crimes were reported in Banksia Grove. The top crimes were theft (216), assault (194), and drug dealing and trafficking (139).
