= Root fire =

Underground wildfire, dangerous because it can propagate unseen and then reignite

A root fire (also known as a ground fire) is a wildfire caused by the burning of tree roots. It is a wildfire caused through underground burns generally triggered by off-trail camping or other causes. They can pose an often overlooked dangerous threat. Because a root fire burns underground, its smoke may appear just as smouldering indistinguishable from the wake of a forest fire. These fires can reignite a wildfire or cause other natural hazards, and are also dangerous to humans and animals if trodden over, because the extreme heat can cause the soil to collapse.

Root fires are similar to peat fires, and have the same function in maximizing the risk and spread of wildfires. Peat fires, however, can cause even more environmental issues due to their composition, impacting the environment, atmosphere, and flora and fauna where they occur.

== See also ==
- Coal-seam fire
- Peat fire
