= Overseas Telecommunications Commission =

Australian government enterprise

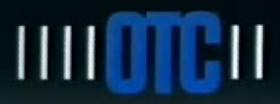
- Type: State Owned Enterprise
- Industry: Telecommunication
- Founded: 1944; 82 years ago
- Defunct: 1 February 1992; 34 years ago
- Fate: Merged with the Australian Telecommunications Corporation
- Area served: Australia

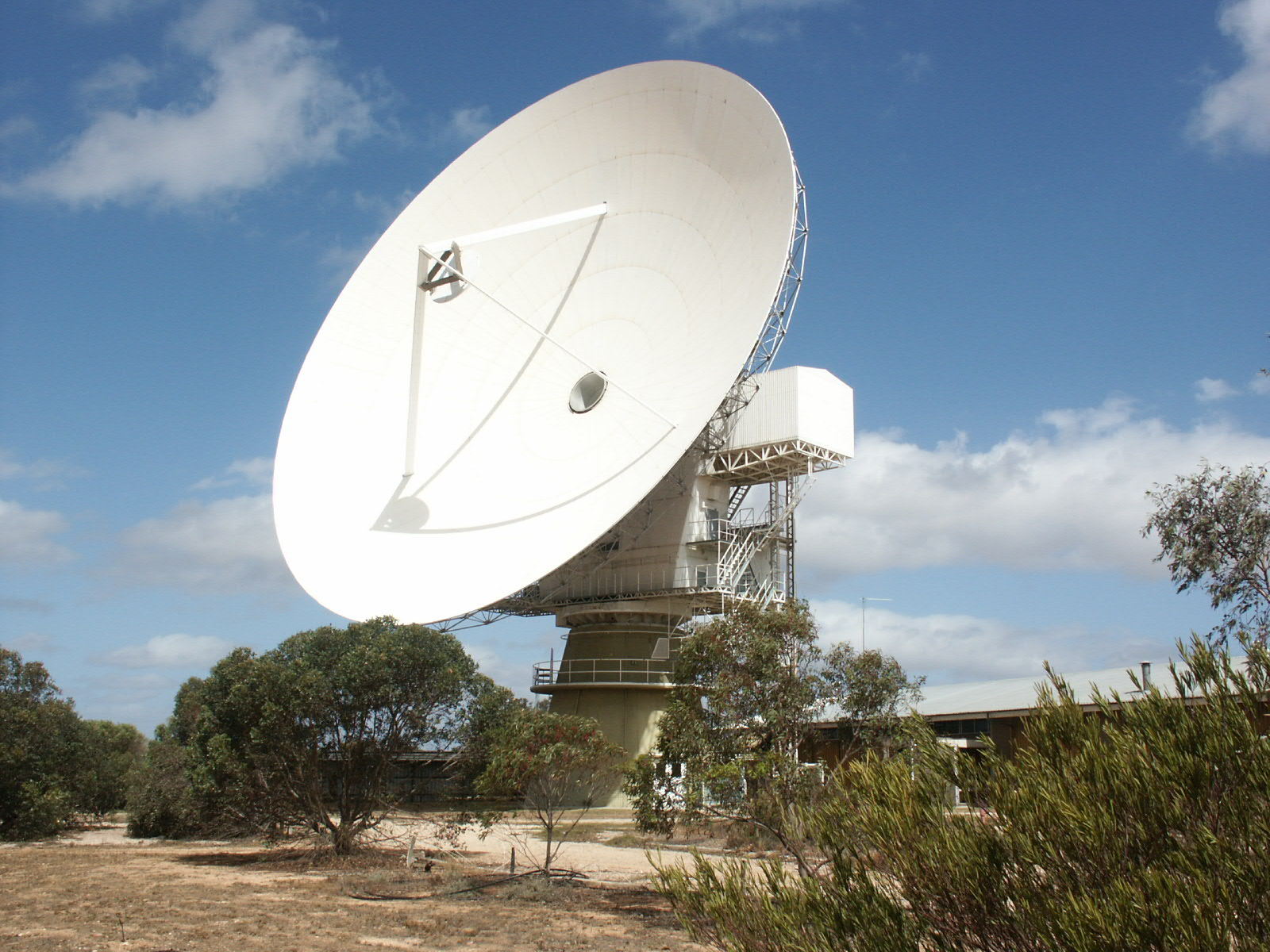
OTC dish at Ceduna, South Australia

The Overseas Telecommunications Commission (OTC) was established by Australia in August 1946. It inherited facilities and resources from Amalgamated Wireless Australasia (AWA) and Cable & Wireless, and was charged with responsibility for all international telecommunications services into, through and out of Australia. In effect, all overseas telecommunications was nationalized. Australia was adopting a Commonwealth-wide policy that had been adopted at the Commonwealth conference in 1945. The main goal was to end the artificial routing of traffic to cable or wireless depending on private financial profits.

On 1 February 1992 it was merged with Australia's domestic telecommunications carrier, the Australian Telecommunications Corporation ("Telecom Australia") to create the Australian and Overseas Telecommunications Corporation (AOTC). The new organisation underwent a corporate identity review and was subsequently renamed Telstra.

When first established in 1946, OTC inherited facilities which had been depleted during World War II, and faced rising costs and falling profits. From this tenuous beginning, the organisation was to grow over the years to gain world standing on the international telecommunications stage.

Throughout rapid developments in undersea cable networks, global satellite systems and burgeoning digital technologies, OTC closely monitored its services to ensure continued quality. It also maintained and developed its links with maritime services, one of the initial arms of Australia's international telecommunications network.

== OTC Timeline 1946 to 1992 ==
=== Background ===
When first established by an Act of Parliament in 1946, Australia's international telecommunications carrier – OTC – inherited facilities which had been depleted during World War II, and faced rising costs and falling profits. From this tenuous beginning, the organisation was to grow over the years to gain world standing on the international telecommunications stage.

The commission's role was the establishment, maintenance and operation of telecommunications services between Australia and other countries. Through the OTC communications, telegram, telephone, telex and photo-telegrams were relayed to other countries around the globe. To undertake these functions the commission was part owner of overseas cables and international satellite facilities and it also operated international and coastal radio services in Australia and its territories. The OTC could well call itself and its services ‘the World Shrinkers’

OTC's history shows how, by internal restructuring, upgrading its public image, making long-term investments in technologies and networks, and becoming a major player in international cooperative efforts, it played a vital role in the provision of Australia's international communications.

OTC maintains monitoring of its services through the use of global satellite systems and digital infrastructure. In support of these efforts, the OTC developed its links with maritime services, such as the initial arms of Australia's international telecommunications network.

=== 1940s ===
1946

- 7 August: OTC established by the Overseas Telecommunications Act, 1946.
- 23 August: First Commission appointed – James Malone appointed Chief Commissioner.
- 1 October: OTC and AWA signed a Caretaker and Management Agreement under which AWA continued to control and operate radio services until such time as the commission had the resources to assume full control.
- 19 October: JES Stevens appointed first General Manager of OTC.

1947

- 1 February: OTC assumed full control of radio services from AWA.
- 28 May: Trials of 5-unit teletype equipment conducted on the Sydney-San Francisco RCA Multiplex.
- June: Tests conducted with the RMS Orlon as part of a series of experiments on the development of circuits to handle radiotelephone traffic with small ships in local waters, and overseas vessels leaving/entering Australian ports.
- 1 July: Interim Management Agreement signed by OTC and Cable & Wireless. OTC assumed managerial control of the Australian international cable network but the assets remained with Cable and Wireless Ltd.
- 7 July: Bassendean receiving station, Western Australia, closed.
- 1 September: New shore-end laid for Pacific Cable at Fanning Island.
- November: Beam Messenger Service discontinued.
- 20 November: Direct Melbourne-Wellington, New Zealand, picture-gram service opened.

1948

- 25 January: First Wagga Weekend (OTC annual staff sports carnival).
- April: OTC's first Annual Report tabled in Parliament.
- 11 May: First International Telecommunication Union meeting since World War II began in Brussels.
- 12 July: Work commenced on a new station building for Darwin Radio.

1949

- 15 January: Adelaide cable station closed.
- 11 April: Arrangements completed for establishing a radiotelephone service between Australia and Royal Australian Navy ships at sea.
- 1 May: Assets of Cable & Wireless purchased by the commission.
- 2 May: Aerogram service commenced between Australian coast radio stations and Qantas and BOAC flights on the Sydney-UK route.
- 19 May: International Telegraph and Telephone Conference (CCITT) began in Paris to revise international telegraph agreements.
- 31 May: Commonwealth Telecommunications Board formed.
- 14 December: OTC's first staff Christmas party held on Sydney Harbour.

=== 1950s ===
1950

- 1 February: Flat rates introduced for traffic to major foreign zones from Australia. Commercial rates to most foreign destinations also amended. All rates increased by 3d per word.
- 1 April: Ownership and control of Cable & Wireless's assets in Australia passed to OTC. All staff except those hired locally at Fanning Island and Suva became members of OTC.
- 5 May: Gangers arrived at Willis Island to remodel the radio station.
- 8 June: New transmitting station opened at Port Moresby.
- 15 June: Old Darwin Radio station closed. New station at Parap opened.
- 5 July: Worldwide unification of telegram categories became effective.
- 30 August: PMG's Department extended picture-gram service to all Australian capital cities, transmitted via OTC's Melbourne office.
- 3 November: JL Mulholland appointed General Manager of OTC. New OTC logo sourced from Radio Hobbies Magazine.

1951

- March: Installation of new phototelegram equipment completed at the Melbourne office.
- 30 June: OTC's rates book revised to include zoning of rates to certain countries, unification of rates and abolition of government rates to certain countries.
- 1 September: First Annual General Meeting held of the Sydney Office Staff Sports and Social Club.
- 1 October: Ships' Letter Telegram service opened to all classes of vessels.

1952

- 26 March: Sydney-San Francisco circuits converted to 5-unit code.
- 15 April: Sydney-London telegraph traffic transferred to Electra House, Sydney. All London-Sydney traffic handled without tape relay at Melbourne.
- 9 June: Transfer of coastal radio operations from Applecross to Bassendean. Applecross became remote controlled.
- 20 October: Electra House became the single operating centre in Sydney.

1953

- 1 June: Cost of all telegraph rates from Australia (excluding urgent press and press messages to USA) reduced by one-third.
- 2 June: Radiotelegraph and cable channels rearranged to cater for heavy traffic during the Coronation of Elizabeth II. Two additional phototelegram channels opened. Bassendean Radio equipped with phototelegram equipment.
- 8 August: OTC's central workshop facilities moved from Pennant Hills to Marrickville.
- November: Sydney's central telegraph operations moved to Spring Street.
- 6 December: Melbourne facsimile section received the first-ever picture for publication from a ship at sea (the Royal yacht Gothic en route to Fiji).
- 15 December: First transmitter at Doonside brought into service.

1954

- January: OTC's acceptance office in Perth closed.
- 2 April: Doonside transmitting station closed and all services diverted to Fiskville and Pennant Hills.
- 23 August: SF Kellock appointed new Chief Commissioner of OTC.

1955

- 16 January: Cooktown Radio station closed.
- 28 February: Adelaide acceptance office closed.
- 9 July: Bringelly commenced monitoring Island Services. Transfer began of radiotelegraph channels from La Perouse to Bringelly.
- 10 October: Bringelly HF radio station officially opened.

1956

- 19 April: Trevor Housley appointed General Manager of OTC.
- 27 April: Severe solar flare activity interrupted OTC's radiotelegraph services.
- 17 August: Qantas leased a two-way radio teletype circuit to Singapore.
- 25 September: First trans-Atlantic co-axial telephone cable, TAT-1 came into service.
- December: During the Melbourne Olympic Games, a record amount of traffic was sent over Australia's international telecommunications channels. 9,408,254 words were sent over 22 leased channels which operated for some 5465 hours. 6730 radiotelephone calls were handled and 2296 phototelegrams were sent. 285 hours of radio broadcasts were sent over R/T channels.

1957

- OTC adopted a new logo.
- 28 February: Doonside transmitting station officially re-opened.
- 5 October: Bringelly, Rockbank and Bassendean stations began monitoring transmissions from the world's first man-made satellite, Sputnik 1, launched by USSR.
- 28 October: Lodgement of international telegrams via the international telex network came into operation - known as the 'printergram service'.

1958

- OTC updated its logo.
- 31 January: USA successfully launched its first satellite - Explorer 1.
- 17 March: Direct radiotelephone service opened between Australia and Japan.
- November: Official opening ceremonies heralded the new international telex services to Japan, USA, UK and Canada.
- December: The USA launched its first delayed repeater satellite: 'Score'.

1959

- 20 April: Commemorative cairn celebrating the landing of the Java-Darwin submarine telegraph cable unveiled in Darwin.
- 28 September: The Pacific Cable Conference hosted by OTC in Sydney was officially opened by Prime Minister Robert Menzies. At this meeting, plans were drawn up for the construction of a new transpacific submarine telephone cable to be known as the Commonwealth Pacific Cable System (COMPAC).

=== 1960s ===
1960

- 4 February: OTC's new Melbourne office at Lonsdale Street officially opened.
- 21 April: First meeting of the Pacific Cable Management Committee began in London.
- 22 August: Ceremony held in Paddington to mark the commencement of work on OTC's new international terminal.
- 23 August: MRC Stradwick appointed Chief Commissioner of OTC.
- 31 August: Direct Australia-New Zealand telex service opened.
- 14 November: Historic No 1 transmitter at Fiskville closed down.
- 15 November: Radioteletype and voice frequency circuit opened between Sydney and Honolulu as part of preparations for a communications system being developed for NASA's Project Mercury (America's first crewed orbital flight).

1961

- 3 January: A radioteletype and voice frequency circuit opened between Perth Radio and a ship in the Indian Ocean as part of preparations for NASA's Project Mercury.
- 27 July: Delegates from Australia, Canada, New Zealand, Singapore and Malaya, Hong Kong, Sarawak, India, Pakistan, Brunei and North Borneo met in Kuala Lumpur to discuss the construction of a proposed new telephone link between Australia and SE Asia: the Seacom cable.
- 23 September: Giles Chippindall appointed Chief Commissioner of OTC.
- November: 5-unit code equipment installed at the Cottesloe cable station.
- 12 December: The new trans-Atlantic telephone cable, Cantat, opened.

1962

- March: Commonwealth Telecommunications Conference began in London to discuss satellite communications.
- 19 April: Shore end of the COMPAC cable landed at Bondi Beach.
- 2 June: The final splice was made on the trans-Tasman section of the COMPAC cable. OTC technician, Orme Cooper, made the first direct voice contact over the cable from Sydney to New Zealand.
- July: Southport cable station closed.
- 9 July: Prime Minister Robert Menzies officially opened the trans-Tasman section of the COMPAC cable.
- 3 December: The Suva-Auckland link of the COMPAC cable officially opened.
- 10 December: Norfolk Island cable station closed at Anson Bay.
- 31 December: The new telephone exchange at Paddington terminal opened.

1963

- 29 March: Adelaide Radio station was transferred from Rosewater to a new station at McLaren Vale.
- April: New transmitting and receiving stations opened at Lae Radio.
- 23 August: AE Chadwick appointed Chief Commissioner of OTC.
- 3 December: The COMPAC cable was officially opened by Queen Elizabeth II addressing simultaneous ceremonies in London, Ottawa, Sydney and Wellington.

1964

- New logo adopted
- 15 January: New Townsville Radio station was officially opened at Pallarenda.
- 16 January: Fanning Island cable station closed at 4.10 pm.
- February: Representatives from OTC attended meetings in Rome and Tokyo to discuss investment plans for a world satellite communications network with European countries, the Japanese and the Americans.
- 20 August: International Telecommunications Satellite organisation (Intelsat) was formed in Washington DC. OTC was one of the founding signatories to agreements setting forth interim arrangements; ensuring Australia's participation in the development of a global satellite communications system.

1965

- 31 March: Singapore-Hong Kong section of the Seacom cable officially opened in Hong Kong.
- April: The first Intelsat satellite, Early Bird, launched into orbit above the Atlantic.
- 28 June: Government officials in Europe and the US exchange greetings via Early Bird.
- September: The automatic transit telex exchange opened at OTC's Paddington terminal, replacing the old manual system which had been in place since 1958.
- October: Agreement reached between NASA and OTC for the provision of a Satellite Earth Station (SES) at Carnarvon, Western Australia which would be linked with NASA's tracking station at Browns Flat and its control centre in the US.
- November: NASA announced that the Intelsat satellite communications system would be used for its crewed space flights to the moon. The Australian government gave its consent for the construction of an SES at Carnarvon, Western Australia.
- December: Land was acquired on which to build a new radio transmitting station at Gnangara in Western Australia, which would be used to provide additional capacity for the NASA space project.
- 3 December: The new radio receiving centre opened at Rabaul.

1966

- 17 January: Harold White took up his duties as General Manager of OTC.
- 26 February: Last messages were exchanged over the Cottesloe-Cocos Island-Rodriguez cable.
- 6 May: New Brisbane Radio station opened at Toorbul.
- 3 July: The new Melbourne Radio station officially opened at Cape Schanck.
- 31 July: Cocos Islands cable station closed.
- 29 October: Carnarvon SES officially opened and successfully tracked the first Intelsat II satellite as it passed over Australia during its transit orbit.
- 25 November: First satellite television link-up between Australia and England was made possible because the first Intelsat II satellite did not reach synchronous orbit over the Pacific Ocean.

1967

- New logo adopted.
- 4 February: Australia's first satellite communications service opened via Carnarvon SES.
- 30 March: Queen Elizabeth II officially opened the Seacom cable. Simultaneous ceremonies were held at Cairns, Guam, Madang, Hong Kong, Singapore and London.
- 14 April: OTC headquarters in Sydney moved from Spring Street to new premises at Martin Place.
- 17 April: Harold White, General Manager of OTC, was appointed chairman of the newly formed Commonwealth Telecommunications Council at its inaugural meeting held in London 17–28 April.
- May: New international radio station opened at Gnangara.
- October: A new staff magazine, Contact, was launched.
- November: Time assignment speech interpolation equipment came into operation on the COMPAC cable, increasing the number of circuits from 80 to 100.

1968

- Logo updated.
- 29 March: Moree SES officially opened, followed by an international television linkup between Australia and Japan.
- 1 April: The first commercial use of Moree SES came on this day when news stations in Melbourne broadcast US President Lyndon Johnson's announcement that he would not stand for re-election.
- July: The radio transmitting station at Applecross closed.
- 29 September: Sydney Operating Room moved to Martin Place.
- 1 October: Arthur Petfield appointed Chief Commissioner of OTC.

1969

- February: OTC's automatic message relay system became operational at the Paddington terminal. Carnarvon SES began service on a part-time basis as a TTC&M station for Intelsat.
- 14 March: The first commercial satellite link to Asia opened between Australia and Japan.
- 31 March: The Commonwealth Telecommunications Board was superseded by the Commonwealth Telecommunications Organisation.
- 31 May: The original beam wireless stations at Fiskville and Rockbank closed.
- 20 July: Pictures of the first man on the moon were telecast to the world via OTC facilities in Australia.
- 1 October: The second satellite earth station at Carnarvon became operational. Carnarvon SES 1 assumed full TT&C functions.
- 9 November: Australia became the first nation in the world to use satellite systems for domestic communications when 24 voice circuits were opened between Carnarvon SES and Moree SES.
- 14 December: The new Ericsson gateway telephone exchange was brought into service at Paddington terminal.
- 15 December: Ceduna SES came into service.

=== 1970s ===
1970

- New logo adopted.
- 20 February: The official opening of Ceduna SES was held at the Adelaide Hotel Adelaide.
- March: OTC's year-end figures showed that the revenue from international telephone services exceeded those of international telegraph services for the first time in the commission's history.
- 21 June: OTC's new office in Brisbane officially opened.
- 5 October: Fully automated telex system introduced onto the Australia-US service.

1971

- 25 January: The first Intelsat IV satellite placed over the Atlantic.
- 20 November: 100th-anniversary celebrations of the landing of the Java-Darwin cable held in Darwin.

1972

- February: Transit resumed as OTC's staff magazine.
- 6 February: The Gemini XII space capsule touring display arrived in Australia to be used for celebrating OTC's 25th anniversary.
- March: Carnarvon Radio station opened.
- 15 July: A direct radiotelephone service opened between Norfolk Island, Australia and beyond.

1973

- February: The Australian Government established the Vernon Commission of Inquiry into the operation of Australia's postal and telecommunications services.
- 27 November: The new Hobart Radio station opened.
- 1 December: The assets and responsibilities for the operation of telecommunications services in Papua New Guinea were transferred from OTC to PNG.

1974

- 21 February: Broadway terminal officially opened by Prime Minister Gough Whitlam.
- March: Preliminary trials of air to ground radiotelephone services for Qantas conducted (concluding 1.4.74). Full-scale experimental trials began for Qantas flights over the Indian and Pacific Oceans.
- 12 November: Alan George Gibbs appointed Chief Commissioner of OTC.
- 25 December: Cyclone Tracy hit Darwin. OTC radio facilities suffered comparatively minor damage.

1975

- May: Australia's first daily international television service commenced. Legislation passed in Parliament advocating the formation of Telecom Australia and Australia Post, and leaving OTC as a separate statutory authority. Telecom was established in July 1975.
- June: Radio-teletype direct printing service established for ship-to-shore messages via Sydney Radio.
- September: Robert Somervaille appointed Chief Commissioner of OTC.
- 25 September: Shore end of the Tasman cable landed at Bondi Beach.
- October: The world's first TASI-B (Time Assignment Speech Interpolation) equipment came into operation at OTC's Paddington terminal, effectively doubling the capacity of the COMPAC cable and 38 of the Seacom cable circuits.

1976

- New logo adopted.
- 12 January: OTC launched its first colour television advertising campaign: Circles.
- February: Members of the International Maritime Consultative Organisation reached agreement on the need for a worldwide maritime satellite system.
- 20 February: Tasman cable officially opened by Prime Minister Malcolm Fraser, speaking from Canberra to Prime Minister of New Zealand, Robert Muldoon.
- 9 March: New ISD (International Subscriber Dialling) service launched at a press conference at OTC's Broadway terminal, coming into commercial operation on 1 April.
- 23 July: A-PNG cable officially opened.
- 31 November: Sydney Radio handled its first ever ship-to-ship telex connection between a vessel sailing in the Atlantic Ocean and one sailing in the Indian Ocean.

1977

- February: OTC became the first signatory to the Inmarsat agreement.
- 6 March: OTC's highly successful advertising campaign - Memories - went to air, promoting ISD.

1978

- 19 May: Capacity of Broadway exchange telephone circuits increased from 2,400 to 6,000 with the installation of new equipment.
- 18 July: Representatives from American, Japanese and Australian telecommunications organisations met at an international telephone conference to herald implementation of the new CCITT No 6 telephone signalling process. This process had been 15 years in the making, through international research and cooperation.
- September: Marisat satellite communications terminals installed on the Australian vessels Robert Miller and the Australian Endeavour.

1979

- 1 March: OTC's maritime radiotelephone service, Seaphone, launched from Melbourne Radio station.
- 13 March: A new operating centre at La Perouse CRS officially opened.
- 18 April: OTC's Midas (Multimode International Data Acquisition Service) came into commercial operation, providing Australian organisations with fast access to overseas information banks through use of advanced computer-based technology.
- 4 May: W Schmidt appointed General Manager of OTC.
- September: OTC's OverseasFax service came into commercial operation.

=== 1980s ===
1980

- 30 April: 50th anniversary of the inauguration of the Australia-UK direct telephone service.
- 14 May: Representatives from 10 countries, including Australia, met at OTC House to sign a document committing those nations, in principle, to start work on a new trans-Pacific cable: ANZCAN.
- June: The world's first optical fibre underwater telecommunications cable laid in Loch Fyne in Scotland to undergo trials.
- 24 July: OTC's fifth satellite earth station, Ceduna 2, officially opened.
- August: OTC's successful television advertising campaign - Friends - launched.
  OTC was awarded a five-year contract by the European Space Agency for the installation, maintenance and operation of VHF launch support facilities at Carnarvon SES.
- 18 September: The Australian government expanded OTC's charter to give it interim ownership and management of Australia's national communications satellite system.
- November: OTC launched its Intertel service.

1981

- Canberra office officially opened: Kamal Ayoub appointed manager.
- 10 April: The first Space Shuttle, Columbia, launched.
- 23 April: Paddington terminal extensions officially opened by OTC's Chief Commissioner, Bob Somervaille.
- October: OTC hosted the 8th South Pacific Regional Telecommunications meeting to discuss requirements and progress of telecommunications services for South Pacific nations.
- November: The Australian Government announced the formation of a national body, Aussat, which would own and manage the new national satellite system.
- 20 December: The first maritime communications satellite - Marecs-A - launched from French Guiana. Carnarvon SES used as a TTC&M station.

1982

- 1 February: Inmarsat assumed control of its international maritime satellite communications network.
- 14 April: OTC opened a new training centre at Marrickville.
- October: The Commonwealth Games, held in Brisbane, led to a massive increase in international telecommunications traffic.
- 3 November: Moree 2 SES was officially opened.
- December: The Sydney-Hobart became the first yacht race in the world to be monitored using satellite communications. An AWA radio vessel was equipped with an Inmarsat terminal.

1983

- 11 January: Shore end of the ANZCAN cable landed at Bondi Beach.
- 19 August: OTC launched its new Minerva data communications service.
- October: OTC established its own Research and Development Board.
- 8 December: The new Norfolk Island cable station officially opened.

1984

- 3 April: OTC hosted an International Teleconferencing Symposium at OTC House. Participants took part in a satellite link-up with other Intelsat member-nations.
- 14 May: Healesville Satellite Earth Station officially opened near Melbourne.
- July: OTC launched its Herogram service for athletes attending the Los Angeles Olympic Games. OTC was the only foreign international telecommunications organisation to have a presence at the Games.
- 8 November: The ANZCAN cable was officially opened by Queen Elizabeth II speaking simultaneously to parties gathered at the Sydney Opera House, Auckland, Suva and Vancouver.
- 30 November: The Compac cable was officially decommissioned.

1985

- January: A new $6M computer system providing data processing services and detailed customer accounting was installed in OTC's Head Office.
- 8 January: The cable laying vessel, CS Pacific Guardian, built in England, sailed into Sydney Harbour on her maiden voyage.
- 20 February: George Maltby was appointed the first managing director of OTC.
- 31 May: Shore end of the AIS cable landed at Whitford Beach, near Perth.
- 23 July: The Intelsat Vista Earth station, installed by OTC on the Cocos Islands, opened.
- November: Telex World Letter service introduced, allowing telex users to send messages to correspondents who did not own a telex machine.

1986

- 18 July: The Seacom cable was taken out of service. Guam cable station closed.
- 28 October: The Perth International Telecommunications Centre, and the AIS cable, were officially opened in Gnangara, WA.
- 16 December: Prime Minister Bob Hawke launched the Request for Tenders for the Tasman 2 cable at an official function in Canberra.

1987

- January: The Coastal Radio Service was officially renamed the OTC Maritime Communications Service.
- 1 February: OTC celebrated its 40th anniversary of operations.
- April: OTC adopted a new logo, and new corporate style.
- 30 April: Carnarvon SES's TTC&M satellite dish was officially decommissioned.
- 2 June: Amendments to the Overseas Telecommunications Act were announced, paving the way for OTC to expand its sales of developed software and provide consultancy services on communications systems to foreign countries. OTC announced the formation of OTC International Limited as its wholly owned international marketing subsidiary.
- 1 July: The new Melbourne International Gateway opened at Scoresby.
- 27 July: The Vietnam Vista satellite earth station was officially opened.
- 11 November: Gareth Evans officially opened the new OTC House at 231 Elizabeth Street, Sydney.
- 27 November: Oxford Falls (Sydney) SES officially opened. (A few days earlier, OTC held a barbecue lunch for staff involved in the project.)
- 17 December: A contract between OTC, Telecom New Zealand and the Tasman Cable Company was signed for the construction and laying of the Tasman 2 optical fibre cable.

1988

- January: Alan Coates appointed Chief Commissioner of OTC.
- Apri18: OTC's Skystream service was officially opened at Sydney SES.
- 28 June: The international videoconferencing studio was launched at OTC House.
- 28 July: OTC opened its Bicentennial exhibition Settlement to Satellites - at Paddington terminal.
- August: Moree SES closed.
- 8 August: The new AXE 900 digital telephone exchange opened at Broadway terminal.
- September: OTC International's proposal for a Pacific Area Cooperative Telecommunications Network was endorsed at the South Pacific forum.
- December: David M Hoare appointed Chairman of OTC, following Alan Coates's resignation. The last in a chain of four earth stations in the Antarctic was completed by OTC at Macquarie Island.

1989

- 1 January: M Hutchinson appointed acting managing director of OTC, following George Maltby's resignation.
- 1 April: OTC was incorporated and became OTC Limited.
- 23 June: Australia's first permanent Internet connection is established using OTC facilities. A 56k satellite connection is commissioned between OTC's Oxford Falls Earth Station in Sydney with Sunset Beach Satellite Earth Station in Hawaii. This link provided a connection between University of Melbourne and University of Hawaii. This was also the first usage of TCPIP on a non-private network.
- July: Steve Burdon appointed managing director of OTC.
- October: OTC Callcard launched.
- 28 October the first Intelsat VI launched and placed in orbit over the Atlantic Ocean.
- November: A direct Australia-UK videoconferencing service opened.

=== 1990s ===
1990

- 9 March: New satellite earth station opened in Hanoi.
- 29 March: OTC International signed its first agreement with island communities in the South Pacific to become members of the Pacific Area Cooperative Telecommunications Network.
- 6 June: OTC launched its Switched Digital service the first international product based on ISDN technology. The service allowed the high-speed transfer of text, data and images, high-speed facsimile and interactive video and audio.
- 10 September: Australian Government announced it had finalised plans for a merger between OTC and Telecom.
- 27 September: New Perth International Telecommunications Centre officially opened.
- 14 November: Senator Gareth Evans received the inaugural telephone call during the official opening ceremony of the Cambodian earth station in Phnom Penh.
- 5 December: A Construction and Maintenance Agreement was signed by OTC and 35 other countries in Canberra for the new A$800 million South Pacific optical fibre cable network.

1991

- 25 January: Commonwealth Telecommunications Interim Board met for the first time. The board was formed by the federal government to advise on the structure of the new telecommunications body which would result from the merger of Telecom and OTC.
- 6 March: OTC achieved the figure of 1 billion paid minutes of bothway international telephone traffic in one financial year.
- April: The new OTC Easifax service was launched in Sydney.
- 15 June: The new Adelaide business office was officially opened.
- November: The new $12M ISDN exchange at Paddington terminal commenced full operations.
- 12 November: The shore end of the Tasman 2 optical fibre cable was landed at Bondi Beach.

1992

- 1 February: OTC ceased operating as a separate company when it merged with Telecom Australia to form the Australian and Overseas Telecommunications Corporation.
