= Melaleuca, Western Australia =

Melaleuca Perth, Western Australia
- Coordinates: 31.710°S 115.915°E
- Population: 0 (SAL 2016)
- Postcode(s): 6079
- Location: 25 km (16 mi) from Perth
- LGA(s): City of Swan
- State electorate(s): Swan Hills
- Federal division(s): Pearce
Suburbs around Melaleuca:
Mariginiup	Bullsbrook	Bullsbrook
Jandabup and Gnangara	Melaleuca	Bullsbrook
Lexia	Ellenbrook	The Vines

Melaleuca is a suburb of Perth, Western Australia, located in the City of Swan local government area.
