= Gnangara, Western Australia =

Gnangara
- Suburb
- Interactive map of Gnangara
- Coordinates: 31.773°S 115.861°E
- Country: Australia
- State: Western Australia
- City: Perth
- LGA: City of Wanneroo
- Location: 24 km (15 mi) N of Perth CBD; 8 km (5.0 mi) SE of Wanneroo

Government
  - State electorate: Landsdale
  - Federal division: Pearce

Area
  - Total: 14 km^{2} (5.4 sq mi)

Population
  - Total: 1,347 (SAL 2021)
- Postcode: 6071
Suburbs around Gnangara
Wanneroo	Jandabup	Melaleuca
Wanneroo	Gnangara	Lexia
Wangara	Landsdale	Cullacabardee

Gnangara is a suburb of Perth, Western Australia, located within the City of Wanneroo. Gnangara is also the name for an underground water mound with a 117-hectare surface feature called Lake Gnangara. The suburb is named after the lake, whose name is derived from the Aboriginal word Knangara.

== Facilities ==
Much of the suburb's area is semi rural, with residential estate developed in the early 1990s by Midland Brick and centred on Lakelands Drive borders includes the private 18-hole golf course Lakelands Country Club, established in 1984 on 70 hectares. The Perth International Telecommunications Centre is located near and often associated with Gnangara.

== Location ==
Gnangara is bounded by Ocean Reef Road and Gnangara Road to the south, Badgerup Road and Ross Road to the west and the Gnangara Pine Plantation to the northeast and east. While the plantation is named for the suburb, only a few hectares of it are within the suburb's boundaries, with the majority in Lexia to the east.

== Education ==
Gnangara contained the Aboriginal Community College (K-12), founded in 1979 and closed in 2008. It was one of two independent Indigenous schools in the metropolitan area.

== Transport ==
=== Bus ===
Bus routes serving Gnangara Road:

- 452 Whitfords Station to Ballajura Station
- 455 Whitfords Station to Ellenbrook Station
- 970 Landsdale to Perth Busport (high frequency)
- 970X Landsdale to Perth Busport (high frequency / limited stops)
