= Lexia, Western Australia =

Lexia
- Suburb
- Interactive map of Lexia
- Coordinates: 31.782°S 115.913°E
- Country: Australia
- State: Western Australia
- City: Perth
- LGA: City of Swan
- Location: 20 km (12 mi) from Perth

Government
  - State electorate: Swan Hills
  - Federal division: Pearce

Population
  - Total: 30 (SAL 2021)
- Postcode: 6079
Suburbs around Lexia
Gnangara	Melaleuca	Ellenbrook
Gnangara	Lexia	Ellenbrook
Landsdale	Cullacabardee	Whiteman

Lexia is a suburb of Perth, Western Australia, located in the City of Swan local government area.
