= Para-law firm =

Alternative legal service provider

In the United Kingdom a 'para-law firm' is an alternative legal service provider. It combines regulated legal services offered by a solicitor and/or a barrister with the services of unregulated paralegals. The combination relies on paralegals working outside the solicitor's or barrister's practices to achieve cost savings for clients.

As paralegals often handle the bulk of the time-consuming legal processing tasks, clients who use the services of a para law firm can benefit from significant reductions in legal costs, whilst still receiving professional legal representation.

The para-law firm ensures that the paralegal work is conducted under the watchful eye of a regulated professional via an external consultancy arrangement.

Effectively, a para law firm can be seen to perform the role of a ‘legal case manager’ – distributing the tasks between paralegals, legal executives, solicitors and barristers in the most efficient manner. A para law firm’s role is to coordinate the performance of legal tasks to achieve cost-effectiveness for clients, while ensuring that the case adheres to agreed time schedules and to expected quality standards.

The term ‘para law firm’ was first coined by Dr Yuri Rapoport B.Sc SJD, an Australian solicitor and legal services visionary, who is also credited for coining the term Law Broker, which refers to a legal referral service.

The world's first para-law firm ('LCM' or 'Legal Case Management') was launched by the Kohen Rapoport Group in United Kingdom in 2017.
