= Shalom House =

Drug rehabilitation facility in Perth, Australia

- Shalom House logo

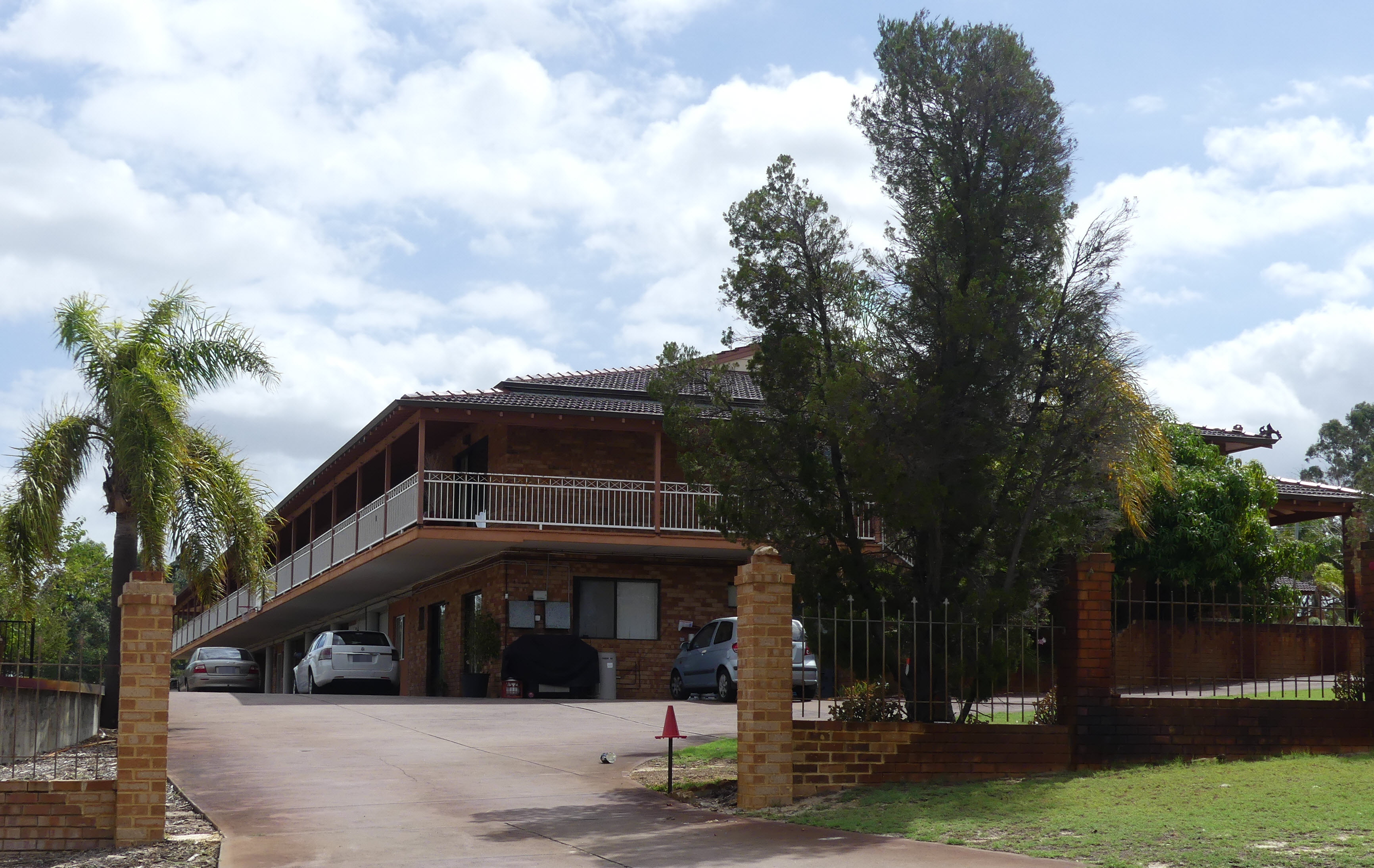
- Shalom House facility
- Founded: 2012
- Founder: Peter Lyndon-James
- Purpose: Drug rehabilitation
- Location: Swan Valley, Western Australia
- Coordinates: 31°48′49.4″S 115°59′03.4″E Shalom House, Perth, W.A.
- CEO: Peter Lyndon-James
- Key people: Peter Lyndon-James; Amanda Lyndon-James; Mike Price; Craig Dorrington; Stephen Wilkinson; Walter Tenhaaf; Milena Djurasinovic
- Revenue: $6,135,728.00 (2025)
- Expenses: $4,584,034.00 (2025)
- Staff: 50+
- Website: www.shalomhouse.com.au

Shalom House is an unaccredited Christian faith-based drug rehabilitation facility located in the Swan Valley about 23 kilometres north of Perth in Western Australia. Operating since 2012, it claims to be the strictest rehabilitation centre in Australia and utilises a tough love model to treat residents. While they have stated they are the most successful rehabilitation centre in Australia, they do not track statistics relating to the success rate of the program and rely on anecdotal evidence to support their claim. Publicly available information indicates the completion rate of the program is less than 5 per cent. Drug and alcohol experts have stated that the drug treatment field moved away from tough love treatments over 30 years ago due to the lack of evidence supporting them in favour of more successful, evidence-based practices. Residents are required to attend three church services a week and the founder, Peter Lyndon-James, has stated that he converts all residents to Christianity within two days of entering the program.

== History ==
Shalom House was established in 2012 by former drug addict-turned-preacher Peter Lyndon-James who purchased a large house in the outer rural suburb of Henley Brook to use as a residential rehabilitation centre for men. A psychiatrist and a GP offered their services one day a week and volunteers were used to run the house. By 2017 Shalom House had expanded to ten locations housing 120 residents and had over fifty staff and volunteers. In 2018, the facility had increased to 140 residents across 14 properties. In 2019 Shalom House filed a development application with the City of Swan for a 600-seat auditorium, administration hub, cafe, and indoor recreation centre with the primary purpose of the facility being for church services and other Shalom House activities. Local residents raised a number of concerns, including the possibility that rehab residents may be housed at the new facility. Shalom House responded by saying that it had no immediate plans to do so. The application was withdrawn later in the same year.

In 2020, Shalom House began running a separate program for women.

In 2022, Shalom House were sued by the City of Swan, who alleged that Shalom House repeatedly ignored requests to stop erecting illegal structures on the $1.9 million property it purchased in Bullsbrook for its proposed women's rehab facility. In a post on Facebook, Lyndon-James acknowledged that he was not acting in compliance with planning rules.

In 2025, Shalom closed its Kalgoorlie-Boulder facility, due to low uptake from local residents. Since opening in mid-2022, only two local residents had enrolled in the facility. It was otherwise mostly occupied by residents from Perth and interstate. By contrast, the Chairman of the WA Government's Mental Health Commission claimed that more than 150 people were on the waitlist for the government funded Goldfields Rehabilitation Services.

On 22 September 2025, Peter Lyndon-James announced that he would step down as Chief Executive Officer effective 1 January 2026. He said the role constrained his ability to express personal views, after criticism of his participation in anti-immigration rallies and related social media posts. Within days, Lydon-James announced he would remain in the role of CEO.

== Costs ==
As an unaccredited facility, Shalom House is not eligible for government funding. Caitlin Shea, a journalist writing for ABC News, noted in a 2019 article that all costs for the program are met by the residents who pay $300 per week for the duration of their stay. An advance payment of $700 is required from anyone on Centrelink payments. Anyone not receiving Centrelink payments must make an advance payment of $1400 if he or she has 100 points of identification and $2800 if he or she does not.

On top of the $300 per week, residents are charged an extra $200 per week in the form of a loan. According to the Shalom House contract, residents who graduate the program have this debt waived but anyone leaving the program for any other reason is required to pay this debt in full.

Shalom House is registered as a charity under West Australian Shalom Group Inc. with the Australian Charities and Not-for-profits Commission.

== Rules ==
Prior to entering the facility, all residents are required to sign an enduring power of attorney, handing control of their finances to Shalom House. They must sign up for a minimum 12-month stay during which they must agree not to swear, smoke or have visitors. Discipline is so strict that even picking up a cigarette butt will result in immediate removal from the program. All residents are expected to work full-time while detoxing, beginning with community service jobs before moving into paid employment. On entry, male residents will have their head shaved and piercings removed.

Lyndon-James has claimed that residents who don't follow the rules are driven "miles away - out the back of Gnangara" and abandoned, with the option of walking back to Shalom House.

== Methods ==
Peter Lyndon-James has no formal qualifications in alcohol and drug rehabilitation but instead operates from his personal experience as a former meth addict and drug dealer. He has created a 5-stage program for rehabilitation.

Stage 1: A 3-month period of cold-turkey detox that involves the loss of autonomy. Residents are not permitted to have access to phones, audio and visual media, books or magazines, nor can they leave the property unaccompanied. Residents work full-time at Shalom House as well as volunteering for local charities. With the exception of residents who are suffering extreme withdrawal symptoms (determined pre-entry by a medical practitioner), no medications are allowed. Although a doctor and a psychiatrist visit Shalom House once per week, detoxing residents do not have professional medical assistance on-site and residents rely on untrained support from fellow residents.

Stage 2: The facility works with the residents to create a plan for their future. They begin working two days per week with an employer aligned with Shalom House who will disciple them.

Stage 3: The residents' external employment is increased to four days per week, access to their mobile phones is returned, and they are allowed to leave the facility unaccompanied with an 8:30pm curfew. They are required to work one day per weekend on staff at Shalom House and can go home for one weekend per month.

Stage 4: The residents are allowed to move from the facility to shared accommodation with other residents if they so choose. They are involved in mentoring newer residents.

Stage 5: The residents are allowed to make their own choices while the facility monitors them. If a resident demonstrates they can meet the facility's standards of a moral lifestyle, then they are permitted to graduate from the program.

== Effectiveness ==
The effectiveness of the treatment at Shalom House is difficult to measure as it does not keep statistics and there is no record of the relapse rate once residents have left the program, although Lyndon-James stated in 2017 that in the time Shalom House had been running, only 10 per cent of the residents had successfully completed the program. He later stated that they do not care about stats and figures because they are not trying to prove anything. He also stated that they had developed the most successful model of rehabilitation in the country and success rates of 80 per cent have been claimed for the program although no evidence has been produced to substantiate this claim. The Mental Health Commission has asked for information but Shalom House has not provided any. Researchers at Edith Cowan University have offered to provide an assessment of the program at no cost to Shalom House but while the offer has been accepted it has yet to be taken up.

An investigation in 2019 by journalist Sarah Brookes for the Community News Group found that out of around 1,000 men that had entered the program, only 49 had completed it, giving a graduation rate of 5 per cent. In comparison, the average completion rate in publicly funded services is 35 per cent. The investigation also revealed that while residents are required to sign up for a 12-month stay, no one had completed the program in that time frame during the investigation and in some cases were taking up to three years to complete it. In comparison, the average length of stay in publicly funded services was between 30 and 90 days.

== Criticisms ==
Stephen Bright, a clinical psychologist and expert in addictions to alcohol and drugs, noted that Shalom House relied on anecdotal evidence as proof of their success and that it was important not to confuse anecdotes with real outcomes. He further noted that the drug treatment field had moved away from tough love types of treatments over 30 years ago because they did not work and in some cases could be harmful.

Nicole Lee, Adjunct Professor at the National Drug Research Institute, Curtin University, stated that this was the only health sector where someone could open a rehab with no other qualifications except experiencing a problem. She stated that providers who created programs based on personal experience often failed to understand the big picture and that it was important to document outcomes in order to determine accurate relapse rates. Tough love programs have the potential to backfire but programs with a more compassionate approach have been shown to be more effective for a larger number of people. "We know from research over the last 50 years that medication-assisted opioid treatment, including methadone and buprenorphine, is the most effective way to reduce use, harms and criminal activity, and improve health."

Stefan Gruenert, a registered psychologist and CEO of Odyssey House Victoria, stated that when claiming outcomes, only including people who completed the program was misleading and that "Anyone who is confident in their model and committed to ongoing improvements should be open to a high level of scrutiny. That's just a good healthy service."

Steve Allsop, a professor at the National Drug Research Institute, Curtin University, stated that only looking at outcomes for residents who completed a program would not give a full picture of the program's success rate and that it was important to include all admissions in the calculations.

Shalom House has been criticised further for stating that they only charge residents $300 per week and not a cent more when they are charging residents an extra $200 per week as a loan, collectable if residents do not graduate the program. An estimated 95 per cent of residents do not graduate. In response to this criticism, Shalom House has updated their web page to reflect the true cost of the program.

A Perth couple stated they were abused and degraded during an intake interview for their son, with Lyndon-James swearing at them and saying they were worse than drug dealers. Lyndon-James has denied swearing. A supporter of Shalom House, who credits the program with saving her marriage, stated that swearing was part of how the program worked and if people didn't like Lyndon-James swearing, they should leave. Shalom House also told the son of the Perth couple, who is gay, that his homosexuality was just a disorder he was suffering from.

The mother of another resident raised concerns when contact with her son was cut off when she questioned Lyndon-James' qualifications to treat mental health conditions after finding that treatment was based on personal experience and religion. Lyndon-James responded by saying the relationship was unhealthy and as the decision was made by the son with support from his psychiatrist, they would not push the son to resume contact. The mother also stated that Lyndon-James showed traits of a self-styled guru and that "Critics of Mr Lyndon-James are shot down by the frenetic support he has built up in the community and any negative stories are ignored."

== Shalom Mechanics ==
In January 2019 Shalom House began advertising an unlicensed car repair service under the name Shalom Mechanics. Licensing is required by law from the Commissioner for Consumer Protection to ensure appropriately qualified people carry out the work, thus enhancing safety and providing confidence and reassurance to consumers. The City of Swan stated that Shalom House did not have planning approval to operate the business from its site.

== Zoning issues ==
In 2015 Shalom House applied to the City of Swan to change the use of its Henley Brook facility from 'dwelling' to 'community purpose'. The council rejected the application on the basis that it did not meet the residential zoning requirements and ordered the facility to shut down. Shalom House took the decision to the State Administrative Tribunal for review who asked the council to reconsider the application under "unlisted or innominate use". The council agreed to review the application as directed. Council later took the matter to the Supreme Court to appeal the State Administrative Tribunals decision. The Supreme Court referred the matter back to the State Administrative Tribunal which ruled that the facility was properly classified as "community purpose" and again asked the council to reconsider the original rejection of the facilities application. The council once more rejected the application and gave Shalom House 12 months to close its Henley Brook facility. The matter has been referred back to the State Administrative Tribunal, which ruled in favour of Shalom House in 2019.

== Religion ==
While men entering the program are not required to be religious, it is compulsory for all residents to study the bible and attend three Christian church services a week. Lyndon-James stated that all residents "ask Christ into their heart within the first two days; every one of my fellows is full on for God."

== Awards ==
Shalom House was named the 2017 Telstra Western Australian Charity Award winner at the 2017 Telstra WA Business Awards.

Shalom House was named the 2019 Not-for-profit Business of the Year by the My Business Awards.

2022 Building Communities Award at the inaugural Telstra Best of Business Awards.

2023 Spirit of Australia Award at the 30th Belmont & Western Australian Small Business Awards.

== Gallery ==
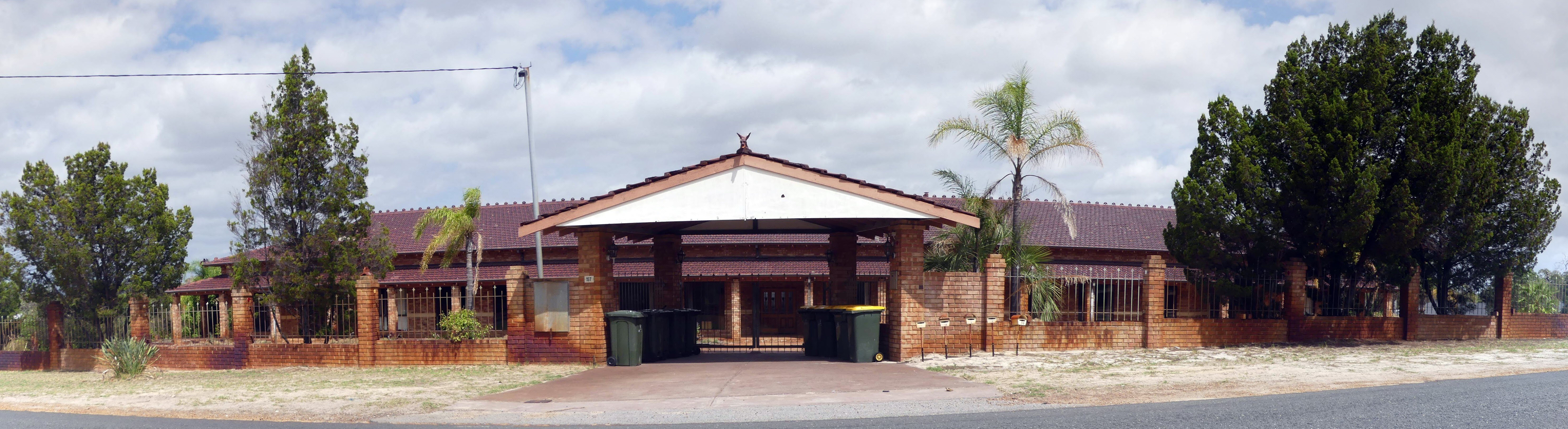
Shalom House from Park Street

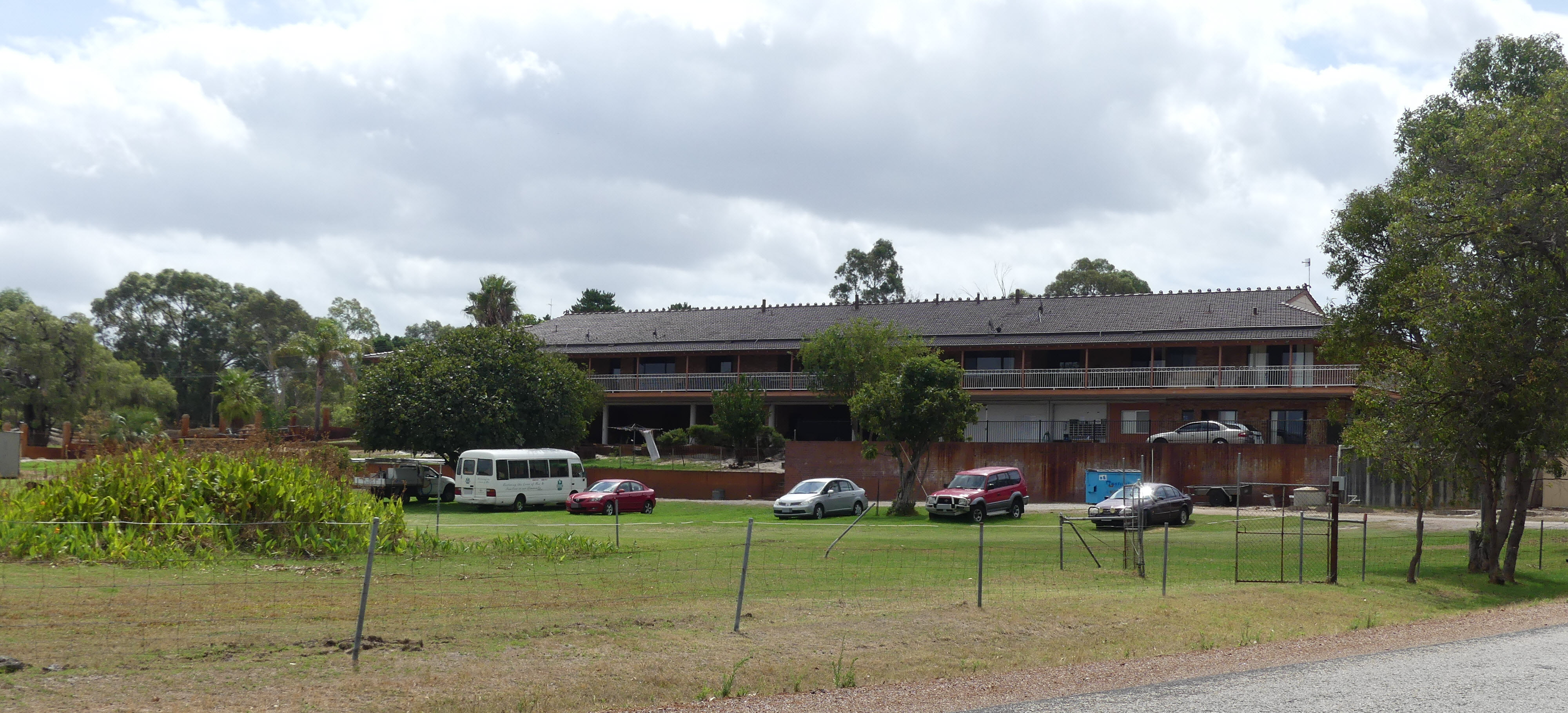
Shalom House rear

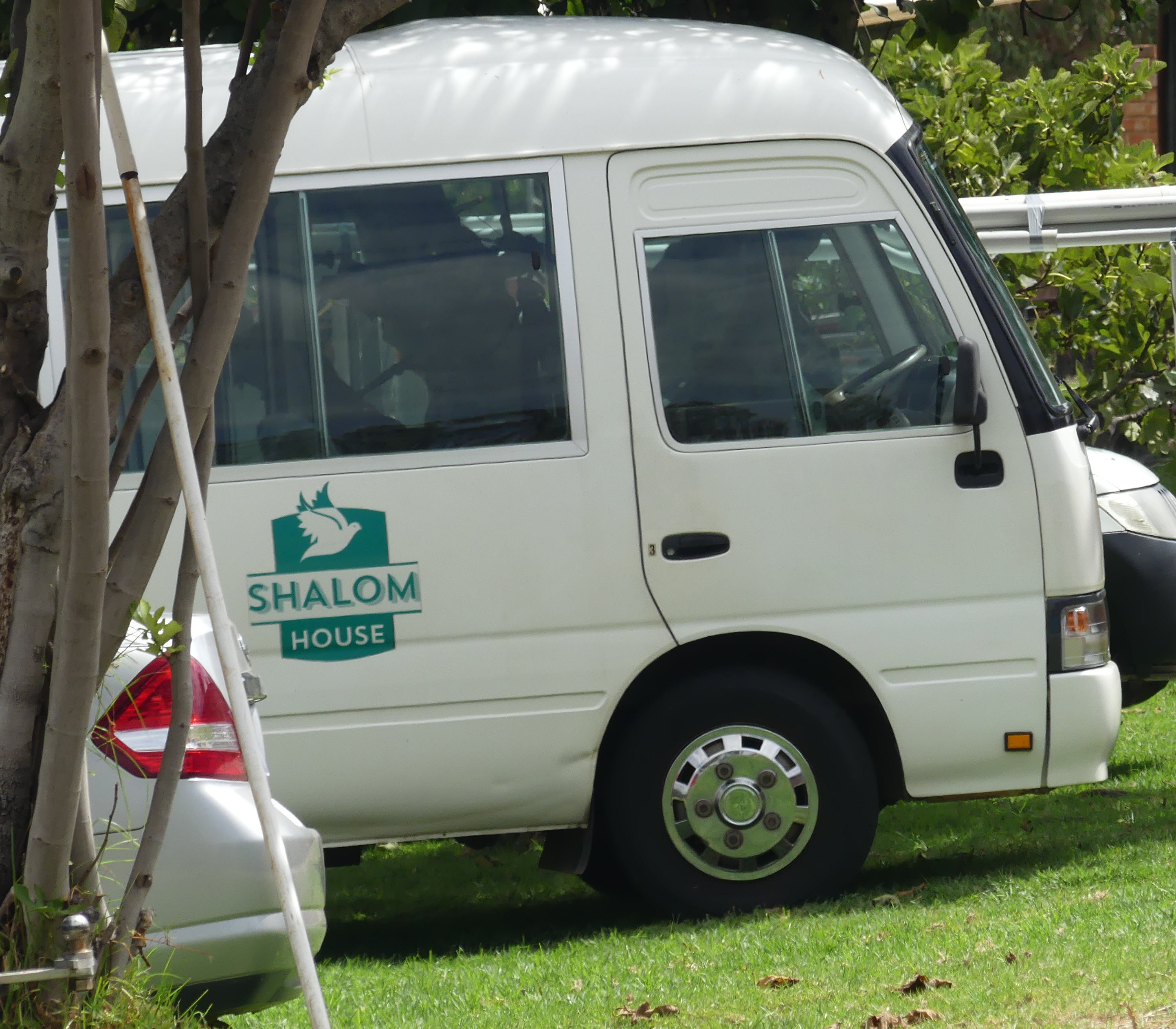
Shalom House bus
