= Comprehensive Social Security Assistance =

Hong Kong welfare programme

- Traditional Chinese: 綜合社會保障援助
- Simplified Chinese: 综合社会保障援助
Transcriptions
Yue: Cantonese
- Yale Romanization: Jung hahp séh wúi bóu jeung wùhn joh
- Jyutping: Zung3 hap6 se5 wui2 bou2 zoeng3 wun4 zo6

Short name
- Traditional Chinese: 綜援
- Simplified Chinese: 综援
Transcriptions
Yue: Cantonese
- Yale Romanization: Jung wùhn
- Jyutping: Zung3 wun4

The Comprehensive Social Security Assistance (CSSA) scheme is a welfare programme in Hong Kong that provides supplementary payments to Hong Kong residents whose income is not sufficient to meet basic needs.

== History ==
=== Historical overview ===
The first public assistance scheme was first introduced in 1971 as the foundation of Hong Kong's social security system. Prior to 1971 the social relief was largely confined and temporary. The Social Welfare Department only came into existence in 1958 and the government restricted its role and stressed the role of family in social welfare. As emphasised in the first White Paper on Social Welfare published in 1965, strengthened family support was the government's imperative in assistance. The paper notes "however generous we may wish to be, we cannot ignore the dollars and cents...In this connexion, Government's endorsement of the Chinese tradition of self-help and of treating relief measures as a family responsibility is correct in theory." Long term plans in social welfare were introduced in the 1970s with double in social spending per capita between 1971 and 1974. Modeled from the British National Assistance Act, the 1971 public assistance scheme indicated the willingness of the government to take care the basic needs of those who are infirm and ill, which has not changed significantly throughout the years. Together with the Social Allowance Scheme (today known as Social Security Allowance Scheme) introduced in 1973, they have been the major components of Hong Kong's social security system. Throughout the 1980s, the total spending on social welfare was between 4.5 and 6.5% of the government's budget and the social security spending was about 0.57% of the gross domestic product.

As a result of the White Paper published by a Working Party in 1991 set up by Governor David Wilson, the public assistance scheme was renamed the Comprehensive Social Security Assistance Scheme in 1993 and its benefits were increased. The Working Party claimed to improve welfare "without creating the sort of dependency culture that has emerged in some industrial societies", it resisted to expand the welfare benefits along the lines of the Western welfare states. At the end of 1993, there were 92,000 CSSA cases compared with 79,700 public assistance cases in the previous year and expenditure on the scheme was $2,073.8 million, an increase of 54.9% over the previous years. In 1995, there were 140,000 people (2% of the population) receiving benefits from this scheme. and they were mainly old people and people with illness or disabilities. Nevertheless, CSSA cases rose from 92,000 in 1993 to 195,645 in 1997 in which the new unemployed cases were found increased significantly.

=== Public expenditure and policy ===
==== Post-1997 Handover ====
The laissez-faire economic policy and the so-called "positive non-interventionism" are regarded two key cornerstones of Hong Kong's economic success in post-war decades. They continue to be the fundamental framework guiding state policy, and are a major obstacle to making major changes in the government's approach to launch new social policy initiatives. In addition, the Article 107 in the Basic Law of Hong Kong stipulates that Hong Kong "shall follow the principle of keeping the expenditure within the limits of revenues in drawing up its budget, and strive to achieve a fiscal balance, avoid deficits and keep the budget commensurate with the growth rate of its gross domestic product". Increase in public expenditure is only possible when budget surplus is available, however the imperative to maintain a balance budget has resulted a government response to cut services and reduce social welfare benefits. During the 1997 Asian financial crises, there was a tremendous increase in unemployment cases applying to CSSA, and at the time, was the only form of public measure and cash benefits available to aid the poor. Since 1997, Hong Kong has had budget deficits from 1998-99 to 2004-05. Financial deficits during these years restricted the HKSAR government's new initiatives and expansion activities to welfare, health and housing. Although never claiming to be a welfare state, both the positive non-interventionist philosophy and the imperative to maintain a balanced budget have produced limited welfare provisions and a growing intensification of poverty for the elderly, unemployed and the working poor.

Figure 1: Statistics on Comprehensive Social Security Assistance Scheme, 1997/98-2014/15

Statistics on Comprehensive Social Security Assistance Scheme, 1997/8 -2014/15
| Year | CSSA expenditure ($ billion) | Government Budget of the GDP | CSSA expenditure as % of government expenditure | Year | Number of CSSA Recipients | Number of CSSA Cases |
| 1997-98 | 9.4 | | 6.3 | 1997 | 282,623 | 186,932 |
| 1998-99 | 13.0 | | 7.9 | 1998 | 368,623 | 227,454 |
| 1999-2000 | 13.6 | +0.8 | 7.8 | 1999 | 376,507 | 230,681 |
| 2000-02 | 13.6 | -0.6 | 7.3 | 2000 | 365,185 | 228,060 |
| 2001-02 | 14.4 | -.4.8 | 7.4 | 2001 | 397,468 | 241,673 |
| 2002-03 | 16.1 | -4.8 | 8.1 | 2002 | 466,868 | 266,571 |
| 2003-04 | 17.3 | -3.2 | 8.8 | 2003 | 522.456 | 290,206 |
| 2004-05 | 17.6 | +1.6 | 9.2 | 2004 | 542,017 | 295,694 |
| 2005-06 | 17.8 | +1.0 | 9.5 | 2005 | 538,963 | 298,011 |
| 2006-07 | 17.6 | +7.3 | 9.3 | 2006 | 521,611 | 295,333 |
| 2007-08 | 18.0 | +0.1 | 9.0 | 2007 | 496,922 | 288,145 |
| 2008-09 | 18.6 | +1.5 | 8.7 | 2008 | 475,625 | 284,569 |
| 2009-10 | 19.0 | +4.1 | 8.6 | 2009 | 482,001 | 289,139 |
| 2010-11 | 18.5 | +3.8 | 8.3 | 2010 | 466,006 | 283,176 |
| 2011-12 | 19.5 | +3.1 | 8.0 | 2011 | 443,322 | 276,710 |
| 2012-13 | 18.7 | +1.0 | 7.1 | 2012 | 418,768 | 269,239 |
| 2013-14 | 18.4 | +3.2 | 6.5 | 2013 | 394,907 | 260,774 |
| 2014-15 | 19.5 | +0.6 | 6.4 | 2014 | 381,307 | 253,054 |

However, in Tung Chee-hwa's first policy address in October 1997, he announced that his 'Administration will work to improve conditions for the elderly' and set out strategies to provide a 'sense of security, a sense of belonging and a feeling of health and worthiness.' This included the establishment of the Mandatory Provident Fund and Carer's Support and Resource Centres as well as increasing the allowance under the Comprehensive Social Security Assistance. In 1997 to 1998, the number of CSSA recipients increased from 282,623 to 368,623 with government expenditure increasing from HK$9.4 billion to HK$13.0 billion.

A Steering Group was subsequently set up with the membership of all civil servants with the Director of Social Welfare as the chair. The Steering Group concluded the 146% increase of CSSA cases from September 1993 to September 1998, three-fold growth of expenditure, attractions of the social security than the slow growth of wages and CSSA payments for a family of four or more were higher low-end wages. The Group recommended to slash benefits at the unemployed and families which exceeded the wages of low-end workers, unpaid voluntary work and terminate CSSA benefits with recipient refused job, re-assessment and strengthening of the arrangements to prevent fraud. At the end of 1997, it was reported that about 111,000 older persons, or 15% of those aged 65 and over, were beneficiaries of the scheme, with the total number of CSSA cases increasing almost four times more from 59,900 household cases in 1985 to 233,000 household cases in 1999.

What is of increasing alarm to policy makers in Hong Kong is the highest increase in CSSA expenditure from HK$1.408 billion in the 1992/93 financial year to HK$14.407 billion in 2001/02, an increase of 9.6 times in an interval of eight years. Government expenditure on CSSA had increased from 31.6% of the total social security expenditure in Hong Kong in 1992/93 to 72.8% in 2001/02. Although social welfare expenditure as a percentage of total public expenditure, as a whole, increased from 3.9% in 1992/3 to 7.25% in 2001/2, CSSA payments alone constituted the largest increase in social welfare expenditure, costing 2.6 of the total government recurrent expenditure in 1993/4 to 8.6% in 1999/2000. While the then Director of Social Welfare, Carrie Lam, remarked in 2001, "There is a consensus within the community that we do not wish to see Hong Kong become a welfare state relying on heavy taxes, that there is a limit to how much the Government can spend and that the virtues of self-reliance, family cohesion and community support should be preserved, in Tung Chee-Hwa’s 2000 Policy Address, he stressed that while social policy only operates as a safety net function, he acknowledges that the 1997 Asian Financial Crisis did make an impact on the community and pledged that he would focus on the plight of low-income families in the coming years. From 1997 to 2003, the CSSA cases increased from 195,645 to 288,648 and the budget rose from $2.4 billion in 1993 to $9.4 billion in 1998 and to $16 billion in 2002 in order to compensate for the Asian Financial Crisis, arrivals of the mainland Chinese immigrants and the ageing population. From 1997-8 to 2003-4, expenditure on social welfare significantly increased from 1.6% to 2.7% of Hong Kong’s GDP.

As a result of the continual alarming increase in CSSA expenditure, the government released the CSSA Review Report titled ‘Support for Self-reliance’ for public consultation in December 1998 as well as published the Report on Review of the CSSA Scheme. The financial secretary, Donald Tsang, noted "we would only be able to meet the ever-growing demands within our overall expenditure constraints by re-examining policies and re-adjusting spending priorities. The modifications to the CSSA Scheme which aim at removing dependence on CSSA and encouraging able-bodied recipients to rejoin the workforce are introduced with this objective in mind. We cannot afford much longer double-digit growth in welfare spending each". HKSAR's goal to increase self-reliance and wean off those who rely on CSSA parallels with a global trend of reforming social security with a ‘welfare-to-work’ strategy as initiated by the New Labour Government in the United Kingdom. The number of CSSA unemployment cases dropped by 23% from 32,335 cases in May 1999 to 24,998 in May 2000. Similarly, the share of unemployment cases among all CSSA cases dropped from 13.8 percent to 11 percent, and the ratio of unemployment CSSA caseloads to total number of unemployed persons in Hong Kong decreased from 15.5 percent to 14.8 percent.

Figure 2: Social Security Expenditure in Hong Kong

| | 1992/93 ($ million) | % | 1993/94 ($ million) | % | 1994/95 ($ million) | % | 1995/96 ($ million) | % | 1996/97 ($ million) | % | 1997/98 ($ million) | % | 1998-99 ($ million) | % | 1999-2000 ($ million) | % | 2000-01 ($ million) | % | 2001-02 ($ million) | % |
|---|---|---|---|---|---|---|---|---|---|---|---|---|---|---|---|---|---|---|---|---|
| Comprehensive social security assistance | 1,408.5 | 31.6 | 2,443.4 | 43.1 | 3,426.8 | 50.8 | 4,831.1 | 55.9 | 7,127.8 | 63 | 9,441.3 | 67.4 | 13,028.7 | 72.6 | 13,623.4 | 73 | 13,559.8 | 71 | 14,404.6 | 73 |
| Disability allowance | 830.4 | 18.6 | 780 | 13.8 | 773.4 | 11.5 | 914.7 | 10.6 | 1,036.6 | 9.2 | 1,181.8 | 8.4 | 1,321.0 | 7.4 | 1,419.8 | 7.6 | 1,567.1 | 8.2 | 1,659.5 | 8.4 |
| Old age allowance | 2,141.6 | 48 | 2,337.1 | 41.3 | 2,435.6 | 36.1 | 2,768.0 | 32 | 3,005.0 | 26.6 | 3,238.4 | 23.1 | 3,416.3 | 19 | 3,463.5 | 18.6 | 3,562.5 | 18.7 | 3,581.2 | 18.1 |
| Compensation schemes | 82.9 | 1.9 | 103.3 | 1.8 | 111.5 | 1.7 | 124.1 | 1.4 | 136.4 | 1.2 | 153 | 1.1 | 183.2 | 1 | 146.7 | 0.8 | 410.9 | 2.1 | 152.7 | 0.8 |
| Total social welfare expenditure | 4,463.4 | 100 | 5,663.8 | 100 | 6,747.3 | 100 | 8,637.9 | 100 | 11,305.8 | 100 | 14,014.5 | 100 | 17,949.2 | 100 | 18,653.4 | 100 | 19,100.3 | 100 | 19,798.0 | 100 |
| Total public expenditure ($ million) | 113,332 | | 147,438 | | 164,155 | | 183,158 | | 182,680 | | 194,360 | | 239,356 | | 214,500 | | 278,388 | | 273,151 | |
| of which % social welfare expenditure | | 3.90 | | 3.80 | | 4.10 | | 4.70 | | 6.20 | | 7.20 | | 7.50 | | 8.70 | | 6.86 | | 7.25 |

==== 2003 to present ====
In the 2003 Policy Address by the HKSAR government, the principle of "big market, small government" was introduced by Tung Chee-hwa and restated in the 2009-10 Policy Address by Donald Tsang. Hong Kong's economic pragmatism towards social policy was reminiscent of the productivist welfare capitalism followed by other East Asian countries, with social policy being strictly subordinate to the overriding policy objective of economic growth. As a result, despite the severe setback in the second quarter from the impact of SARS, with unemployment cases rising sharply from 7.2% in the fourth quarter of 2002 to 8.7% in May–July 2003, the Hong Kong economy recovered and grew by 3.3 per cent, faster than the 2.3 per cent growth in 2002. However, expenditure on social welfare reduced, with the Executive Council approving a reduction of the standard rate of CSSA allowances by 11%.

The Task Force on Population Policy set up by the government and chaired by the then Chief Secretary of Hong, Chief Secretary, Donald Tsang recommended in its report issued on 26 February 2003 that the seven-year's residence requirement should be introduced to restrict the new arrivals from mainland China to join the CSSA scheme. In January 2004, the Administration revised the residence requirement from one to seven years. Under the revised requirement, Hong Kong residents aged below 18 were exempted from any prior residence requirements. The Director of Social Welfare re-affirmed that adding the seven-year residence rule sought to reflect the contribution a resident has made towards the Hong Kong economy over a sustained period of time. Since coming into effect in 2004, CSSA expenditure still continued to rise, increasing from HK$17.6 billion in 2004/5 to HK$18.4 billion in 2013/14 when the Court of Final Appeal ruled the change in the eligibility criteria as unconstitutional and a violation of the Basic Law.

In Carrie Lam’s 2017 Policy Address, she states "We will continue to devote resources to poverty alleviation as well as support for the disadvantaged in order to build a caring and inclusive society." On using fiscal reserves wisely she notes, "Sound public finance and optimal use of public resources are key to good governance…I fully appreciate the requirements stipulated in the Basic Law of keeping expenditure within the limits of revenues and avoiding fiscal deficits as far as possible." Despite the last time the HKSAR government have fallen into a fiscal deficit was in 2003/4 and now currently holding a fiscal reserve in excess of HK$1,000 billion, the total CSSA caseload at the end of August stood at 234 930 with a total of 344,910 recipients, dropping from 253,054 cases and 381,307 recipients in 2014-15. While fiscal conservatism in Hong Kong stemmed from the colonial administration, in which the government was characterised by its vulnerability on social policy to influences from business and financial interests, as well as its unwillingness to increase taxation to finance such expenditure, Secretary for Financial Services and the treasury Professor K.C. Chan remarked " While adhering to the principles of fiscal prudence…the Government's spending has been far from conservative. Recurrent expenditure has increased from $150 billion in 1997-98 to more than $290 billion in 2013-14, an increase of nearly one-fold. The increase in recurrent expenditure reflects the Government's long-term commitment to improving people's livelihood." When compared to the 1997–98, expenditure on social welfare increased by about two-fold and CSSA expenditure increased from HK$9.4 billion in 1997/8 to HK$18.4 billion. However, in terms of CSSA expenditure as a percentage of total recurrent percentage, there was only a 0.2 increase, with CSSA expenditure accounting for 6.3% of total recurrent expenditure in 1997/8 and 6.5% in 2013/14. Since the highest recorded percentage of 9.5% in 2005/6, CSSA expenditure has been declining each year (Figure 1).

== Eligibility ==
Firstly, the applicant must be a Hong Kong resident and has been of resident status for more than one year. As well, they need to have resided in Hong Kong for at least a year since acquirement of resident status. However, under some circumstances, some individuals may be exempted from the residence requirement by the Director of Social Welfare.

An applicant must pass an asset test and income test to be considered eligible for the Comprehensive Social Security Assistance. An individual's assets include the total value of their properties or land, cash, bank savings, investments in stocks and shares, and other recognised assets. These assets are not just limited to those in Hong Kong, but also in Macau, the Mainland, and overseas countries. With that, a single able-bodied adult applying for the CSSA has an asset limit of HK$30,500, while a child, elder, disabled or ill-health individual's limit is HK$47,000. Any persons over the age of 60 is considered to be an elderly individual. For family households, an able-bodied adult or child's asset limit is HK$20,500, while four or more members would set the asset limit to be HK$82,000. For elders, disabled persons or ill-health individuals in family cases, one member's asset limit would be HK$47,000 while six members would set the limit to HK$162,000. To be eligible and considered for the CSSA, individuals must fall below the stated asset limits.

As for the income test, an individual or a family will be eligible for CSSA if "their total assessable monthly household income is insufficient to meet their total monthly needs as recognised under the Scheme."

Able-bodied individuals also have additional criteria to be considered for the CSSA. Those that are aged 15–59 with normal health conditions are deemed able-bodied. They must either earn more than HK$2,160 per month and work more than 120 hours per month, or be actively seeking work, and participating in the job-finding program. As well, their reason for being unable to work plays a factor in their eligibility. For example, a student applying for the CSSA may not work because of studying or having to look after sick family members.

== Recipients ==
As of 30 September 2017, there are 234,292 cases of CSSA. Compared to 2014, there were 254,054 cases, marking it as a decrease. Of the 234,292 cases so far in 2017, 144,507 of those are related to those with old age, while 4,641 of those are due to low earnings. The table below lists all the CSSA cases by nature of the case from 2010 to September 2017. It is evident that the number of cases from each category have dropped gradually each year.

| Case category | Dec 2010 | Dec 2011 | Dec 2012 | Dec 2013 | Dec 2014 | Dec 2015 | Dec 2016 | Sept 2017 |
|---|---|---|---|---|---|---|---|---|
| Old age | 153,754 | 153,950 | 153,302 | 151,259 | 149,149 | 146,083 | 144,336 | 144,507 |
| Permanent disability | 18,381 | 18,449 | 18,384 | 18,391 | 18,225 | 17,914 | 17,602 | 17,240 |
| Ill health | 25,190 | 25,168 | 25,319 | 25,157 | 24,973 | 24,458 | 24,184 | 23,849 |
| Single parent household | 34,372 | 32,860 | 30,903 | 29,193 | 29,529 | 28,403 | 26,985 | 26,331 |
| Low earnings | 14,407 | 12,319 | 10,339 | 8,891 | 7,584 | 6,335 | 5,230 | 4,641 |
| Unemployment | 29,814 | 26,859 | 23,980 | 21,149 | 18,650 | 16,332 | 14,340 | 13,415 |
| Others | 7,259 | 7,105 | 7,012 | 6,734 | 4,944 | 4,570 | 4,379 | 4,309 |
| Total no. cases | 283,176 | 276,710 | 269,239 | 260,774 | 253,054 | 244,095 | 237,056 | 234,292 |

== Residence requirement ==
One limb of the eligibility test for CSSA is the requirement of having been resident in Hong Kong for a certain number of years in the past, though not necessarily immediately before applying. Under the predecessor schemes to the CSSA, this requirement was 10 years up until 1959, five years after that, and then just one year after 1970. In 2004, the Tung Chee-hwa administration extended that period to seven years, in response to the rising cost of CSSA payments to Mainland Chinese new immigrants in Hong Kong, though children under the age of 18 were exempt from this new requirement. At the same time, the Tung administration introduced an additional requirement that the applicant have been resident in Hong Kong for one year immediately prior to the date of applicant.

Both of the requirements introduced in 2004 have since been struck down by the courts. In June 2010, in response to a lawsuit (Note: Yao Man Fai George v Director of Social Welfare, HCAL 69/2009) by a Hong Kong permanent resident formerly working in mainland China who had returned to Hong Kong after becoming unemployed, the Court of First Instance held that the requirement of one year's residence immediately prior to the date of application violated the right of freedom of movement in Article 31 of the Basic Law. The government appealed the ruling, but the Court of Appeal upheld the lower court's ruling and ruled against the government in February 2012. (Note: Yao Man Fai George v Director of Social Welfare, CACV 153/2010) Then, in a 2013 case (Note: Kong Yunming v Director of Social Welfare, FACV 2/2013) by a mainland Chinese woman whose husband had died soon after her arrival in Hong Kong, the Court of Final Appeal ruled that the seven-years' residence requirement violated Articles 36 and 145 of the Basic Law and ordered that the previous one-year requirement be reinstated.

== Program administration ==
=== Introduction ===
Though the allocation of CSSA is committing to the government regulations, the effectiveness of this social welfare, which aims to provide appropriate aid to the suitable clients, heavily depends on the frontline caseworkers who have close interaction with the applicants. As of November 2017, there are a total of 2,394 staff working under Social Security Branch in Social Welfare Department, which is responsible for the execution of CSSA, in which frontline caseworkers like Senior Social Security Assistant (SSSA) and Social Security Assistant (SSA) in the SSA rank are responsible for the investigation and assessment on CSSA cases.

=== Heavy workload ===
Workload of the SSA rank has been increasing over the years, with low increase in corresponding workforce. CSSA's recipients in 2010-2011 totalled 446,783, with 1,124 staff members in the SSA rank. Each frontline workers have to conduct nine interviews with new applicants on average every working day, and receiving 18 phone enquiry. As well, they must regularly review interviews with existing recipients, verify documents, make home visits and finish other workloads. On average, each CSSA caseworker has to deal with 320 cases in total per year. Caseworkers could hardly bear such a huge caseload. In the study conducted by Hong Kong Chinese Civil Servants’ Association (HKCCSA), over half of the respondents have encountered mental problems due to the high working pressure. Eventually, it costed an average of 30 working days for processing a new case of CSSA (by field units), while it costed an average of 10 minutes before a CSSA's client is attended (in field units).

=== Criticism toward bureaucrats ===
Caseworkers have been criticised for their poor attitude when handling CSSA applications. The Office of the Ombudsman issued an investigation report in December 2008, disclosing the loose check and indifferent judgment of the SWD frontline workers. The Ombudsman criticised these caseworkers by stating that the "abandonment of common sense and lack of practical judgment" between the staff in SWD had caused abuse of the CSSA system.

Moreover, legislative councillor Cheung Chiu Hung argued that the SSA ranks are not licensed social workers, who could handle administrative work only, without understanding what the applicants really need, due to heavy workload.

In the HKCCSA study, nearly 90% of respondents agree that they have no extra time to find out applicants' needs apart from CSSA. It is acknowledged that newly hired caseworkers will be offered a one-week training course, which introduces the regulations in SWD and code of how to pay real concern on applicants. However, in the HKCCSA study, 71% of respondents did not think those regulations were pragmatic, in which half of them even cannot work completely in compliance with those regulations.

Caseworkers should strictly follow the regulations and code of ethics in SWD, especially when exercising discretionary power. It was however, mentioned in the HKCCSA study that rules are sometimes interpreted differently, in addition with ambiguous explanation on how to use discretionary power.

Discretions are not unusual and could be done in various ways. Caseworkers will shorten the intake interview time, especially when they are busy. Some of them may question the applicant's eligibility with a challenging tone which will cause the applicant to voluntarily withdraw themselves. Caseworkers might also exercise discretion during the stage of case investigation. They may discretionarily verify the applicant's documents and omit the examination of the applicant's living condition throughout the home visit. Lastly, CSSA frontline caseworkers usually would not disclose how much grants the recipients receive so as to prevent them from demanding for more assistance. It is however noted that sometimes extra assistance may be offered as a means to entertain the requests of the recipients, especially for the demanding ones. CSSA recipients have become more and more knowledgeable, allowing them to join hands with different parties, thus causing fear among caseworkers. Caseworkers would exercise discretion to speed up the application process even if against their own will just to make the recipients are satisfied, avoiding any troubles and subsequently being complained by supervisors. Additionally, there are situations where the caseworkers may set up the cases for those who are seemingly ineligible, in order to maintain their caseloads. Exercising discretionary power can minimise requests form CSSA applicants, and hence reduce their workload. Thus, it is a great burden for SSAs to strike a balance between entertaining the applicant's need and preventing any fraud and abuse.

== Controversies ==
=== Elder age eligibility ===
At a Policy Address in January 2017, then-Chief Executive, CY Leung, introduced several new amendments to the social welfare of Hong Kong. One of these included raising the eligibility age of the elderly from 60 to 65 years old to apply for CSSA. On the other hand, Elderly Health Care Vouchers age eligibility was lowered from 70 years old to 65. This sparked controversy as it would have singled out many elderly Hong Kong citizens that were supposed to be eligible for CSSA, but now cannot because of the raise of the age allowance. The Hong Kong government's explanation for such an amendment to the CSSA is because the Hong Kong population has improved on life expectancy; people in Hong Kong are living longer than before. CY Leung was stated saying that he still "want[s] to encourage these CSSA recipients to work", implying that the CSSA is not a way to get out of employment. However, those that were within the ages of 60 to 65 at the time of the policy change will not be affected and will still be eligible to apply.

=== Residence requirement from one year to seven years ===
Before 1 January 2004, any Hong Kong resident was eligible to apply for Comprehensive Social Security Assistance (CSSA) as long as they had been living in Hong Kong for a year. However, after 2004, Hong Kong residents were only eligible to apply for CSSA after living in Hong Kong for seven years. This was in effect from 2004 to 2013. On 17 December 2013, this residence requirement was considered to be unconstitutional by the Hong Kong Court of Final Appeal (CFA). Indeed, "the top court ruled that the seven-year residency rule breached Article 36 of the Basic Law, which says every citizen has a right to social welfare benefits under the CSSA scheme." Furthermore, the CFA considered that this seven year residence requirement was inconsistent with the one-way permit policy implemented by the Hong Kong government to facilitate family reunions and also to alleviate the overall burden of population ageing. Indeed, welcoming new immigrants could help rejuvenating Hong Kong population.

This shift in CSSA requirement was originally because of Kong Yunming who arrived in Hong Kong from Mainland China in 2005 to rejoin her husband with a one-way permit. She stayed in her husband's public housing for the time being, but her husband died a few days after her arrival. The Housing Authority processed a housing exclusion, and she became homeless. Kong Yunming attempted twice to resort to law but her appeals were both dismissed until her case was brought to the CFA. Here, the CFA unanimously declared that it was inconsistent with the Basic Law and the residence requirement was changed back to one year.

Following the court decision, some experts like Ho Hei-wah, director of the Society for Community Organisation, thought that it would eventually lead to an increase of CSSA applications per year of approximately 6,000 new residents. In subsequent months, the Hong Kong government received a tremendous number of applications from people who were not initially eligible because they had been living in Hong Kong for less than seven years. Back then, many people were worried that this change of policy would highly impact the financial burden. To reassure people on the real cost of this policy change, the government published figures. In September 2014, 18,439 people who had been living in Hong Kong for less than seven years received CSSA and it accounted for only 4.8% of the total number of CSSA recipients which amounted to 384,305 people. In 2014, 37% of CSSA recipients who were now eligible under the one year residence requirement were people aged under 18 years old; 58% of CSSA recipients living in Hong Kong for less than seven years were people aged between 18 and 59 years old; and 5% of those recipients were people of 60 years old or above. The defenders of one year residence requirement argued that this requirement was not the only one so that in the case of a shift from seven years to one year, the financial burden would not be that important.

A question therefore arises of what drives the policy change of CSSA from a one-year residence requirement to a seven-year residence requirement. From 2000 to 2004, the Hong Kong government was running budget deficits and it required budget cuts from all social sectors. In 1999, the government budget accounted for 0.8% of the GDP whereas in 2002, it accounted for -4.8% of the GDP. CSSA budget was impacted from 1999 to 2002 as the number of CSSA recipients increased from 376,507 people to 466,868 people and in the meantime, CSSA expenditure as % of government expenditure only increased from 7.8% to 8.1%.

=== Family members living together being assessed as a household ===
This is a controversy concerning the procedure for applying for the CSSA, where members of the same family living under the same roof have to apply to CSSA as a single unit. One request for this entire household would then suffice and be taken into account: "If the applicant is living with any other family members, the application has to be made on a household basis. The total resources and needs of all family members in the same household are taken into account in determining the family’s eligibility for assistance. In other words, the monthly income and expenses of all family members will be calculated together." That could give an extra edge to the solidarity between generation, or rather the opposite as it would create incentives for young people and elderly people to leave their family homes and live by themselves. Therefore, the idea of authorising elderly people to apply for CSSA on their own has been widely debated in recent years. It has been repeatedly suggested by multiple studies that saving accounts should be established for CSSA recipients who earn HK$4,200 per month or above. It would aim at encouraging the younger generations to help with their family living expenses as well as earning more money for themselves that would be well above HK$4,200 a month, hence making them ineligible for CSSA.
