= Legal cost finance =

Legal cost finance (or legal cost credit) is an alternative funding solution to traditional legal financing (or litigation funding in United Kingdom).

Unlike litigation funding, which is limited to contentious legal cases and claims a stake in the proceeds of a case outcome, legal cost finance is a funding alternative that offers consumers payment plans (on the basis of credit facilities) to cover legal costs of both contentious and non-contentious matters. Effectively, legal cost finance is a specialised financing solution that spreads the cost of legal services over an extended period and enables consumers to repay their legal bills via instalments.

For lawyers, legal cost finance provides the assurance of on-time bill payment and minimisation of disputes over legal costs. A third-party arranger (specialised broker) installs the payment plan facility and settles legal costs on the client's behalf using the credit funds (usually held in escrow accounts). If a dispute over a legal bill arises, the broker can 'quarantine' the dispute to prevent stalling of the legal matter. That is, the disputed bill is placed in abeyance until a later date (usually after completion of the legal case) whilst the lawyer continues to be paid from the credit facility. The disputed bill is later revisited in the context of the case outcome – normally the client will forfeit the dispute in the event of a successful case result, and vice versa (i.e. the lawyer will forfeit the dispute in the event of an unsuccessful case outcome).

Legal cost finance can function as a cost-neutral credit facility. That is, the charges associated with legal cost finance (arrangement fees and interest) can be absorbed by the lawyer (directly or by discounts on legal fees), enabling the client to effectively pay legal bills without incurring additional costs. Lawyers are usually forthcoming about covering client's charges associated with legal cost finance on the client's behalf in exchange for the payment assurances they receive from the broker over their bills.

For consumers of legal services, legal cost finance is an alternative to the payment of significant up-front costs to lawyers on the basis of a retainer agreement. Effectively, therefore, LCF makes legal services more affordable.

Consumers can apply for LCF solely on the basis of their credit history because the specialised loans are provided on an unsecured basis. However, in certain large legal matters security over loans will be required.

LCF primarily relies on a report from the acting lawyer stating the merits of the case, which is assessed by the broker. This is designed to protect consumers from potentially irresponsible advice and to prevent the court system from cluttering by unmeritorious cases.

LCF was first launched in the United Kingdom by an independent law broker, Dr Yuri Rapoport in October 2013.
