= Ghost lawyer =

Legal ghostwriter

A ghost lawyer, also known as a legal ghostwriter, is a lawyer who writes legal opinions for other lawyers without accreditation. Ghost lawyers may offer their services to other lawyers on a project-by-project basis.

While most states permit the practice, ethical concerns have been raised with regard to pro se litigants.

With an increase in pro se litigants during the 21st century, some attorneys have adapted their services to offer "unbundled" legal services, in which the attorney agrees to a limited role in assisting a self-representing client.
