= Law broker =

Professional assisting individual who are searching for a lawyer

In Australia, Canada and New Zealand, a law broker or legal brokerage is a professional that assists individuals who are searching for a lawyer. A law broker will analyze an individual's case or legal issue and provide a customized referral to an appropriate lawyer. Some common factors that a law broker will consider are a lawyer's experience level, success rate, reputation, and quality of service. A law broker will often review legal publications, court decisions, and rely upon a network of legal contacts to provide an objective, customized referral to a client.

An Australian solicitor Dr. Yuri Rapoport of Kohen Rapoport Group started the world's first law broking firm "Prime Law Brokers" in 1996. The law broking firm of Terry Bramham also existed in Melbourne in 1996.

The development of the private-sector legal referral industry in Australia, New Zealand and United Kingdom has occurred.

== Fees ==
In most circumstances, a law broker does not charge a fee to a client but rather obtains a referral fee from the lawyer.

== In other countries ==
In North America, an equivalent service is provided by lawyer referral programs, which are usually operated by bar associations. Claims management companies are the equivalent in England and Wales.
