= Intake interview =

Type of interview in clinical psychology

Intake interviews are the most common type of interview in clinical psychology. They occur when a client first comes to seek help from a clinician.

The intake interview is important in clinical psychology because it is the first interaction that occurs between the client and the clinician. The clinician may explain to the client what to expect during the interview, including the time duration. The purpose of the intake interview often includes establishing and diagnosing any problems the client may have. Usually, the clinician diagnoses the patient using criteria from the first two DSM axes. Some intake interviews include a mental status examination. During the intake interview, the clinician may determine a treatment plan. In some cases, particular clinician may feel that he or she lacks the expertise to best help the client. It is during the intake interview that the clinician should refer the client to another source.

During the intake interview, both parties form opinions about one another that can be either positive or negative. The client begins to perceive the characteristics of the therapist during this intake interview and the clinical relationship between the two starts to form here. A client's perception of a clinician during an intake interview can either hinder or encourage them to get further treatment. The more clients perceive positive qualities in their therapists, the more likely they are to attend sessions in the future. This decision whether or not to continue treatment is usually made after the intake interview takes place. Studies have found that almost all patients make a decision about whether to return or not after the intake interview. Approximately fifty percent of psychotherapy patients drop out of treatment and most of these patients do so after they have an intake interview. Therefore, it is important that during intake interviews that the clinician expresses to his or her clients that they have a correct understanding of the client and his or her needs and emotions. This helps the client feel secure, and thus makes it more likely that the client will continue to seek treatment.

Most clinicians conduct their own intake interviews. However, bigger organizations with a larger staff pools may have social workers or other employees who conduct these interviews. Interviewers have varying approaches when it comes to conducting intake interviews with clients. The way that the clinician conducts the intake interview sets the tone for the continued course of treatment. Communication style is important during these interviews. Some patients prefer to be asked specific questions by the interviewer, whereas some patients prefer to open-endedly talk about their feelings. In many cases, the interviewer can get a sense of the patients' preference. It is important that the client build rapport during the interview. It is often beneficial to both the client and the patient to have a balance in which the clinician asks questions and the patient also volunteers certain information. This allows the interview to have somewhat of a conversational flow and become more personal.
