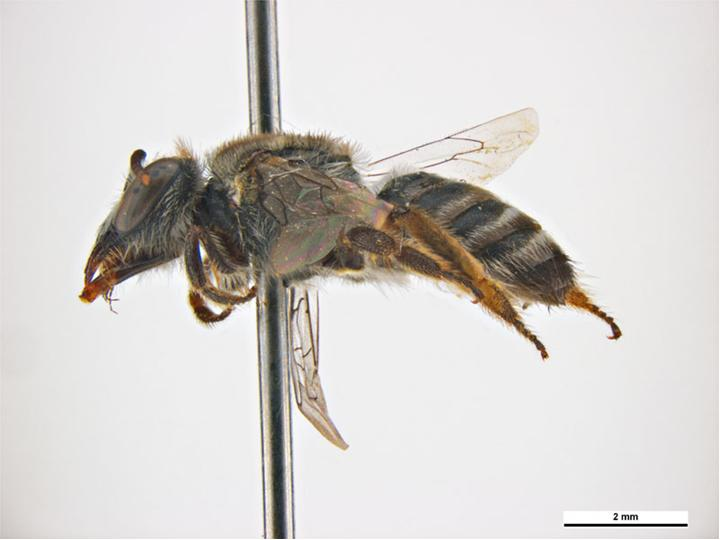
- Female

Scientific classification
- Kingdom: Animalia
- Phylum: Arthropoda
- Clade: Pancrustacea
- Class: Insecta
- Order: Hymenoptera
- Family: Colletidae
- Genus: Leioproctus
- Species: L. plautus

Binomial name
- Leioproctus plautus Maynard 1991

= Leioproctus plautus =

Species of bee

Leioproctus plautus, or Leioproctus (Protomorpha) plautus, is a species of bee in the family Colletidae and subfamily Colletinae. It is endemic to Australia. It was described by Australian entomologist Glynn Maynard in 1991.

== Etymology ==
The specific epithet plautus (Latin: "flat-footed") is an anatomical reference to the hind basitarsus.

== Description ==
Male body length is about 7 mm. Integumental colouration is mainly black; the hair is white and brown.

== Distribution and habitat ==
The species occurs in south-west Western Australia. The type locality is 10–13 km north-east of Wanneroo.

== Behaviour ==
The adults are flying mellivores. Flowering plants visited by the bees include Beaufortia elegans and Lechenaultia stenosepala.

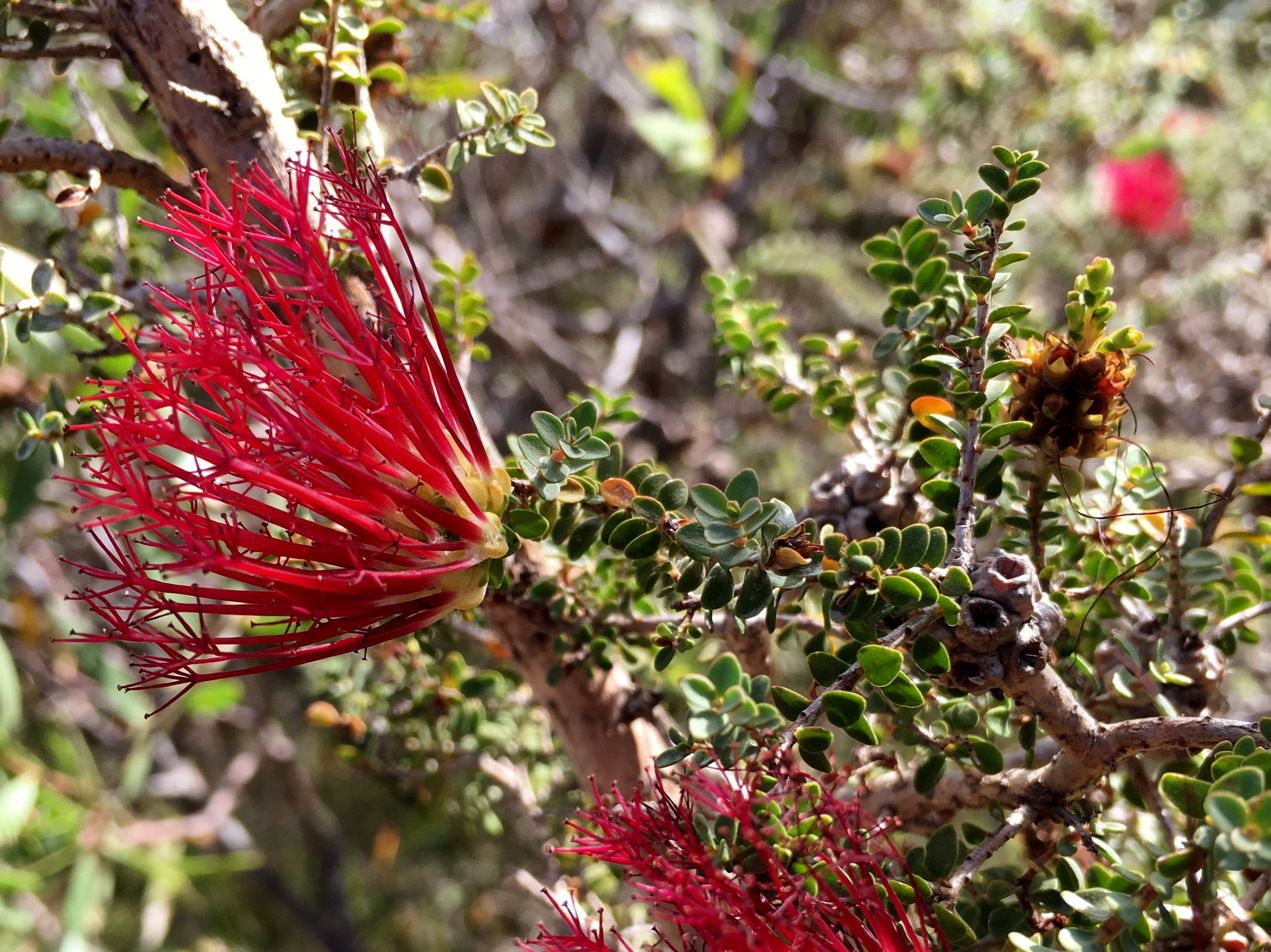
Beaufortia elegans (elegant beaufortia), a forage plant of the bees

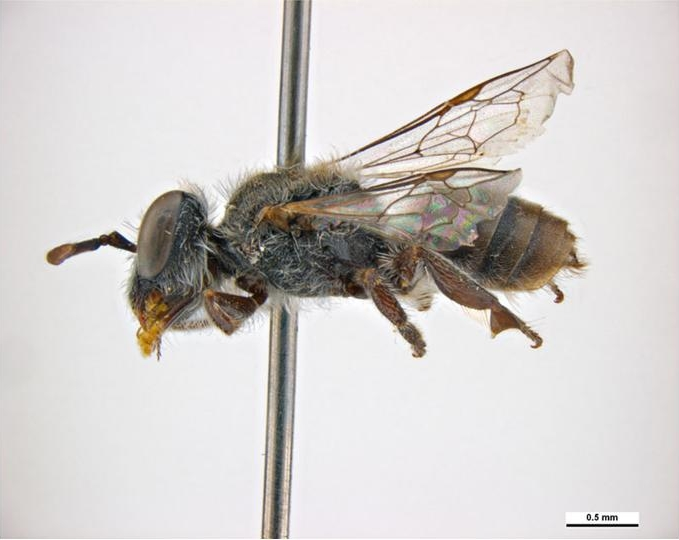
Male
