= Leioproctus gurneyi =

Scientific classification
- Kingdom: Animalia
- Phylum: Arthropoda
- Clade: Pancrustacea
- Class: Insecta
- Order: Hymenoptera
- Family: Colletidae
- Genus: Leioproctus
- Species: L. gurneyi

Binomial name
- Leioproctus gurneyi Batley, 2013

Species of bee

Leioproctus gurneyi, or Leioproctus (Protomorpha) gurneyi, is a species of bee in the family Colletidae and subfamily Colletinae. It is endemic to Australia. It was described by entomologist Michael Batley in 2013.

== Etymology ==
The specific epithet gurneyi honours cartoonist and comic strip creator Alex Gurney.

== Description ==
Male body length is about 5.6 mm, head width 1.9 mm; female body length 7.5 mm, head width 2.3 mm. Integumental colouration is mainly black with brown markings; the hair is white.

== Distribution and habitat ==
The species occurs in inland eastern Australia. The type locality is Ethabuka Reserve in Central West Queensland.

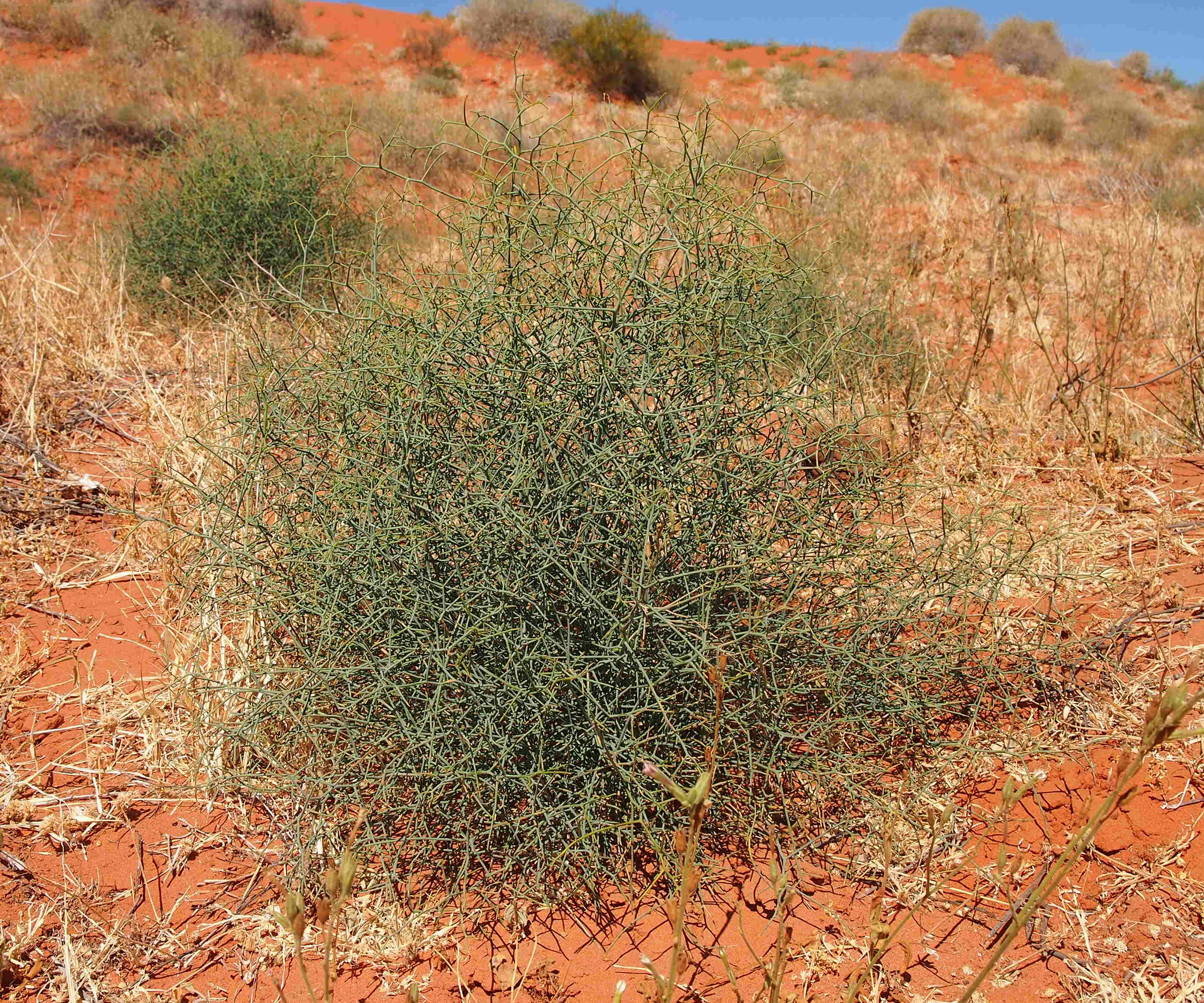
Lechenaultia divaricata (wirebush), a forage plant of the bees

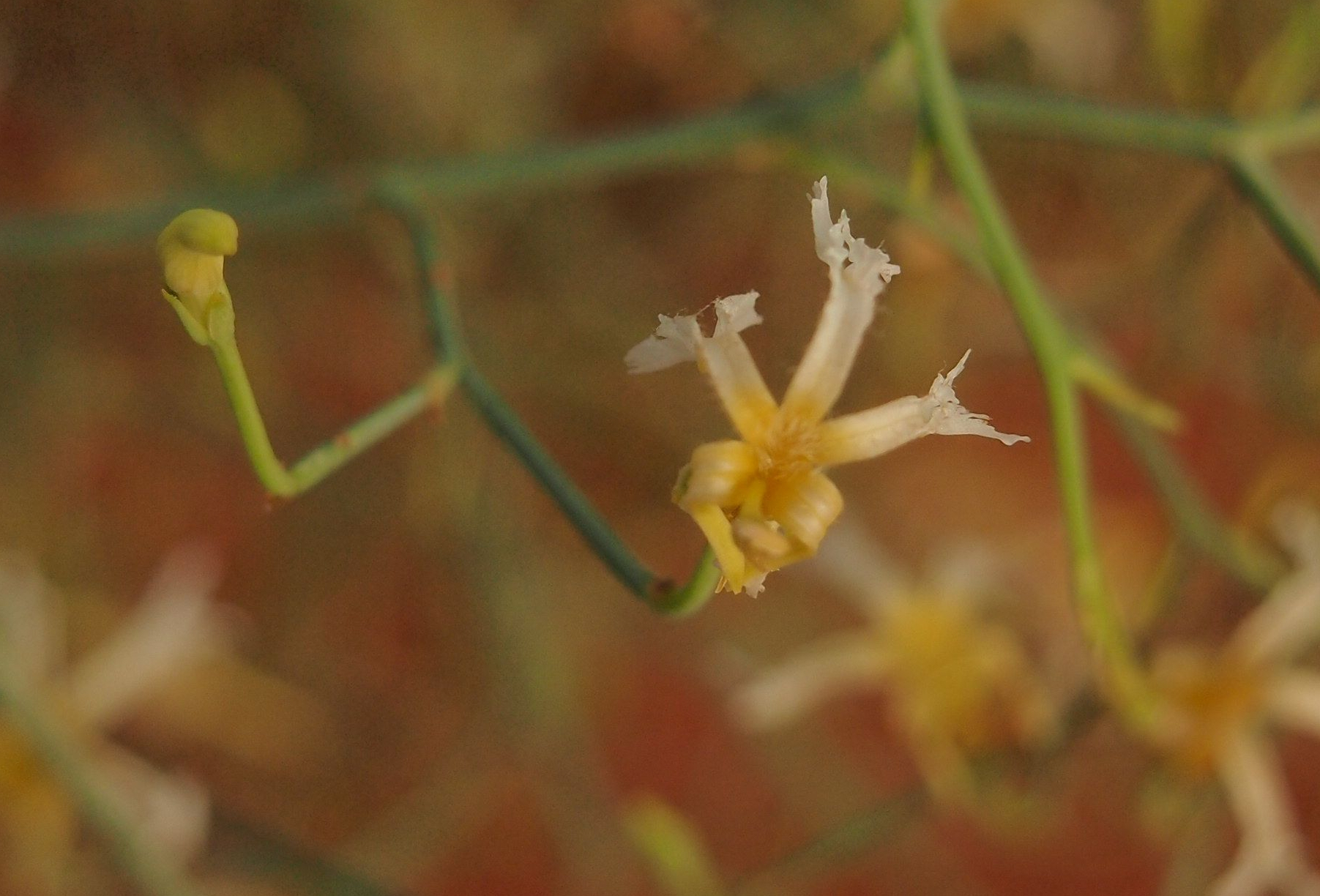
Lechenaultia divaricata flower

== Behaviour ==
The adults are flying mellivores. Flowering plants visited by the bees include Lechenaultia divaricata.
