= L. juncea =

L. juncea may refer to:

- Lechenaultia juncea, a plant with monosymmetric leaves
- Lespedeza juncea, a bush clover
- Libellula juncea, a hawker dragonfly
- Lomandra juncea, a perennial herb
- Lygodesmia juncea, a plant with fascicled stems
