= Lechenaultia aphylla =

Conservation status
- Priority One — Poorly Known Taxa (DEC)

Scientific classification
- Kingdom: Plantae
- Clade: Tracheophytes
- Clade: Angiosperms
- Clade: Eudicots
- Clade: Asterids
- Order: Asterales
- Family: Goodeniaceae
- Genus: Lechenaultia
- Species: L. aphylla

Binomial name
- Lechenaultia aphylla Benth.

Species of flowering plant

Lechenaultia aphylla is a species of flowering plant in the family Goodeniaceae and is endemic to arid parts of inland Australia. It is a glabrous herb or subshrub with spreading branches, almost no leaves, and yellow, tube-shaped flowers.

== Description ==
Lechenaultia aphylla is a glabrous herb or subshrub that typically grows to a height of up to 50 cm (20 in) with spreading branches. Its few leaves are scattered and 0.5–1 mm (0.020–0.039 in) long but soon fall off. The flowers are borne singly or in small groups on the ends of branchlets, the sepals 1.0–1.5 mm (0.039–0.059 in) long. The petals form a yellow tube 15–18 mm (0.59–0.71 in) long, the tube hairy inside. The wings on the lower petal lobes are triangular, 1.0–1.5 mm (0.039–0.059 in) wide. Flowering occurs sporadically and the fruit is about 15 mm (0.59 in) long.

== Taxonomy ==
Lechenaultia aphylla was first formally described in 1992 by David A. Morrison in the Flora of Australia from specimens collected near Mount Finke by David Eric Symon in 1987. The specific epithet (aphylla) means "without leaves".

== Distribution and habitat ==
This leschenaultia has been recorded between sand dunes and on flats in open shrubland and is only known from a few locations near Yellabine north of Ceduna in South Australia and in the Great Victoria Desert in Western Australia.

== Conservation status ==
Lechenaultia aphylla is listed as "Priority One" by the Government of Western Australia Department of Biodiversity, Conservation and Attractions, meaning that it is known from only one or a few locations which are potentially at risk.
