= Lechenaultia lutescens =

Scientific classification
- Kingdom: Plantae
- Clade: Tracheophytes
- Clade: Angiosperms
- Clade: Eudicots
- Clade: Asterids
- Order: Asterales
- Family: Goodeniaceae
- Genus: Lechenaultia
- Species: L. lutescens

Binomial name
- Lechenaultia lutescens D.A.Morrison & Carolin

Species of shrub

Lechenaultia lutescens is a species of flowering plant in the family Goodeniaceae and is endemic to inland central Australia. It is a wand-shaped, ascending herb or subshrub with rigid, narrow leaves, and orange-yellow to pale yellow or creamy-white flowers.

== Description ==
Lechenaultia lutescens is a wand-shaped, more or less glabrous, ascending herb or subshrub that typically grows to a height of up to 50 cm (20 in). The leaves are rigid, narrow, rather fleshy and 14.5–20.5 mm (0.57–0.81 in) long. The flowers are arranged in loose groups, the sepals 3.5–4.5 mm (0.14–0.18 in) long and the petals 16–22 mm (0.63–0.87 in) long with long hairs inside the petal tube. The petal lobes and wings are orange-yellow to pale yellow or creamy-white, the wings on the upper lobes usually 2–3 mm (0.079–0.118 in) wide, on the lower lobes triangular and usually 0.8–1 mm (0.031–0.039 in) wide. Flowering occurs sporadically, and the fruit is 15–25 mm (0.59–0.98 in) long.

== Taxonomy ==
Lechenaultia lutescens was first formally described in 1987 by David A. Morrison and Roger Charles Carolin in the journal Brunonia from specimens collected near Yuendumu. The specific epithet (lutescens) means "becoming yellow".

== Distribution and habitat ==
This leschenaultia grows with spinifex on sandplains, dunes and stony creek beds in inland areas of Western Australia and the Northern Territory.

== Conservation status ==
This leschenaultia is listed as "not threatened" by the Government of Western Australia Department of Biodiversity, Conservation and Attractions and of "least concern" under the Northern Territory Territory Parks and Wildlife Conservation Act 1976.
