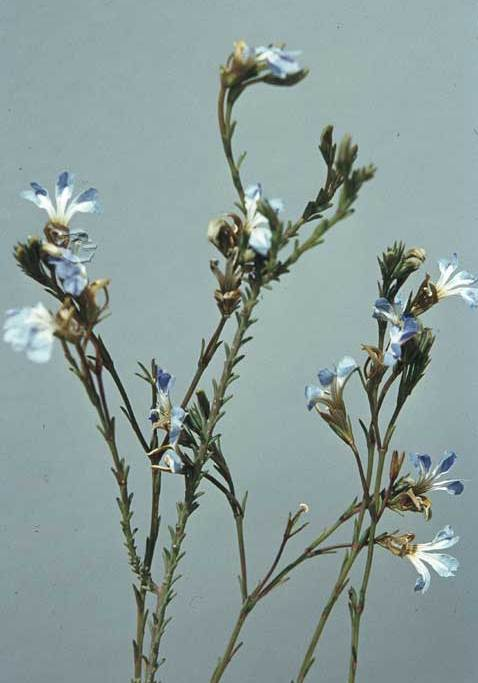

Scientific classification
- Kingdom: Plantae
- Clade: Tracheophytes
- Clade: Angiosperms
- Clade: Eudicots
- Clade: Asterids
- Order: Asterales
- Family: Goodeniaceae
- Genus: Lechenaultia
- Species: L. heteromera

Binomial name
- Lechenaultia heteromera Benth.

= Lechenaultia heteromera =

Claw leschenaultia

Species of flowering plant

Lechenaultia heteromera, commonly known as claw leschenaultia, is a species of flowering plant in the family Goodeniaceae and is endemic to the south-west of Western Australia. It is a subshrub with a few wand-like branches, fleshy leaves, and white and pale blue flowers.

== Description ==
Lechenaultia heteromera is an ascending subshrub that typically grows to a height of 80 cm (31 in) and has a few wand-like branches. Its leaves are fleshy, often down-curved, and 4.5–6.5 mm (0.18–0.26 in) long. The flowers are arranged in groups near the ends of branchlets, and have sepals 6.5–9.0 mm (0.26–0.35 in) long. The petals are 14–19 mm (0.55–0.75 in) long with a few long, with soft hairs inside the white petal tube. The wings on the lower lobes are triangular, 2.0–2.2 mm (0.079–0.087 in) wide, and on the upper lobes up to 0.1 mm (0.0039 in) wide, the wings and lobes pale blue. Flowers occurs from August to December and the fruit is 20–28 mm (0.79–1.10 in) long.

== Taxonomy ==
Lechenaultia heteromera was first formally described in 1868 by George Bentham in Flora Australiensis from specimens collected from East Mount Barren by George Maxwell. The specific epithet (heteromera) means "unequal parts", referring to the petal lobes.

== Distribution and habitat ==
Claw leschenaultia grows in heath, scrub and woodland on the south coast of south-western Western Australia between Starvation Boat Harbour and West Mount Barren in the Esperance Plains and Mallee biogeographic regions of south-western Western Australia.

== Conservation status ==
This leschenaultia is listed as "not threatened" by the Government of Western Australia Department of Biodiversity, Conservation and Attractions.
