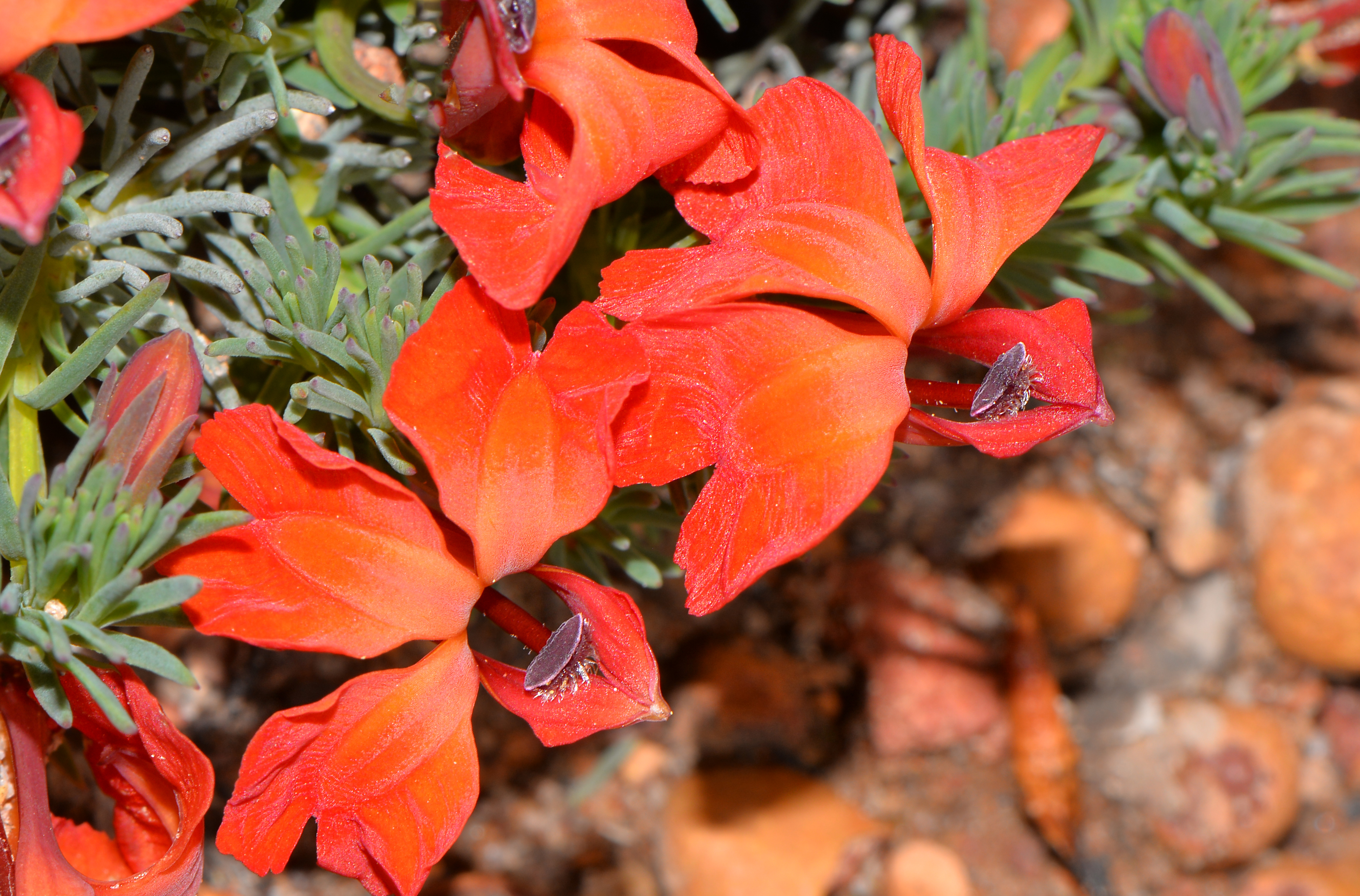
- Lechenaultia formosa in Wandoo National Park

Scientific classification
- Kingdom: Plantae
- Clade: Tracheophytes
- Clade: Angiosperms
- Clade: Eudicots
- Clade: Asterids
- Order: Asterales
- Family: Goodeniaceae
- Genus: Lechenaultia
- Species: L. formosa

Binomial name
- Lechenaultia formosa R.Br.

Synonyms
- List: Lechenaultia baxteri G.Don nom. illeg., nom. superfl.; Lechenaultia formosa R.Br. f. formosa; Lechenaultia formosa f. typica E.Pritz. nom. inval.; Lechenaultia formosa R.Br. var. formosa; Lechenaultia formosa var. oblata (Sweet) E.Pritz.; Lechenaultia multiflora Lodd., G.Lodd. & W.Lodd. nom. inval., nom. nud.; Lechenaultia multiflora Lodd. ex DC. nom. illeg., nom. superfl.; Lechenaultia oblata Sweet; Leschenaultia formosa R.Br. orth. var.; Leschenaultia formosa f. typica E.Pritz. orth. var.; Leschenaultia formosa var. oblata (Sweet) E.Pritz orth. var.; Leschenaultia oblata F.Muell. orth. var.

= Lechenaultia formosa =

Red leschenaultia

Species of flowering plant

Lechenaultia formosa, commonly known as red leschenaultia, is a species of flowering plant in the family Goodeniaceae and is endemic to the south-west of Western Australia. It is a prostrate or erect shrub or subshrub with crowded, narrow, fleshy leaves and scarlet or orange-red to pale orange flowers.

== Description ==
Lechenaultia formosa is a prostrate or erect shrub or subshrub that typically grows to a height of 20–40 cm (7.9–15.7 in) and has stems with many, sometimes low-lying branches that often sucker. Its leaves are crowded, narrow, fleshy and 4.5–8.5 mm (0.18–0.33 in) long. The flowers are arranged singly on the ends of branches, and have sepals 5–6 mm (0.20–0.24 in) long. The petals are scarlet to orange-red or pale orange, 15–21 mm (0.59–0.83 in) long and have long, soft hairs inside the petal tube. The petal lobes are more or less equal in size, the wings on the upper lobes 0.5–1.5 mm (0.020–0.059 in) wide and the lower lobes triangular and 2.2–4.0 mm (0.087–0.157 in) wide. Flowering mainly occurs in winter and spring but flowers are often present in other months.

== Taxonomy ==
Lechenaultia formosa was first formally described in 1810 by Robert Brown in his Prodromus Florae Novae Hollandiae et Insulae Van Diemen. The specific epithet (formosa) means "beautifully formed".

== Distribution and habitat ==
Red leschenaultia grows in heath, scrub, mallee and woodland and is found across a wide swathe of Western Australia, from the Geraldton sandplains south through to the southwestern corner of the state and east along the southern coast. It grows on granite-, laterite- or clay soils, where it is found on hills, and in flat areas and gullies.

== Use in horticulture ==
Renowned for its bright red, orange or yellow flowers, Lechenaultia formosa is widely cultivated in Australian gardens. It was first grown in the United Kingdom in 1824. Many cultivars were sold in the 1960s that are no longer available. It grows best in well-ventilated locations with very good drainage; otherwise it is prone to fungal disease, in particular grey mould (Botrytis cinerea) of the branches and soil-borne Phytophthora and Pythium, and is often short-lived. It is propagated readily from cuttings of semi-hardened wood.

Lechenaultia formosa can be grown in hanging baskets or rockeries.

== Conservation status ==
This leschenaultia is listed as "not threatened" by the Government of Western Australia Department of Biodiversity, Conservation and Attractions.
