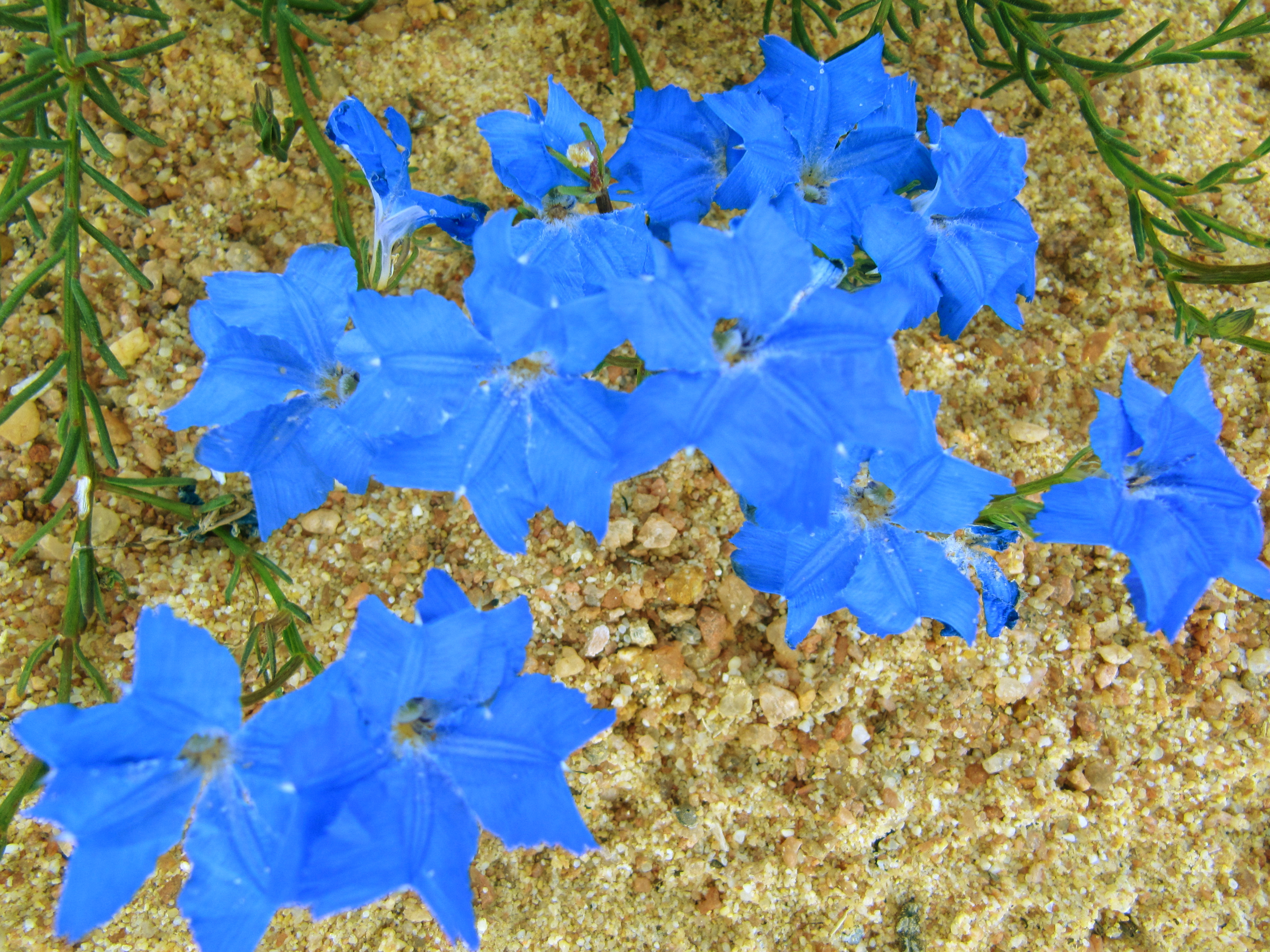
- Lechenaultia biloba in Kings Park, Perth

Scientific classification
- Kingdom: Plantae
- Clade: Embryophytes
- Clade: Tracheophytes
- Clade: Spermatophytes
- Clade: Angiosperms
- Clade: Eudicots
- Clade: Asterids
- Order: Asterales
- Family: Goodeniaceae
- Genus: Lechenaultia; R.Br.

Species
- See text

Synonyms
- Ericopsis C.A.Gardner; Lechenaultia sect. Latouria (Endl.) Benth.

= Lechenaultia =

Genus of plants

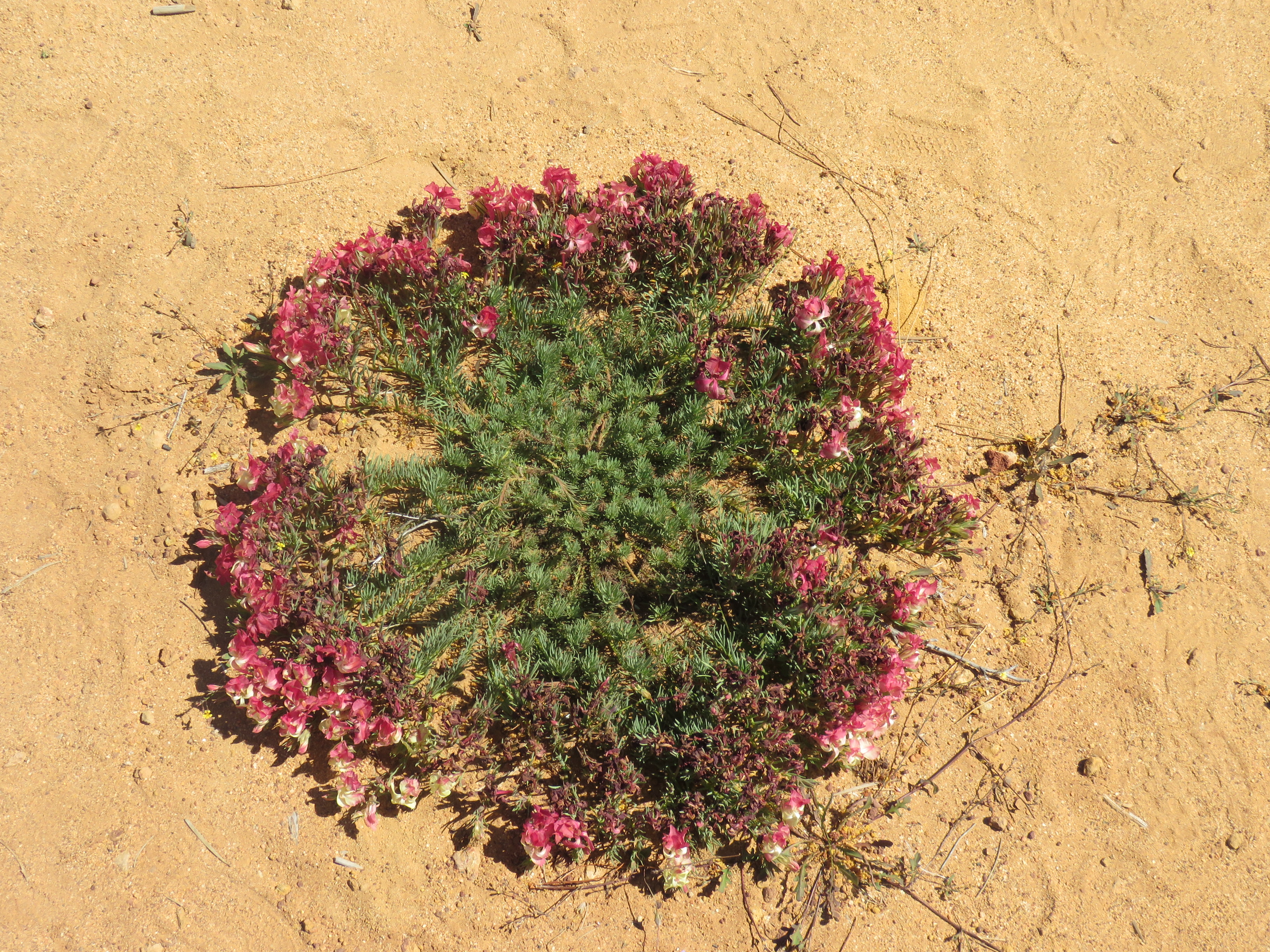
Wreath lechenaultia (L. macrantha)

Lechenaultia is a genus of flowering plants in the family Goodeniaceae, the species native to Australia with one species (L. filiformis) also occurring in New Guinea. Plants in the genus Lechenaultia are glabrous shrubs or herbs with needle-shaped leaves, more or less sessile flowers with five sepals and five blue, white, or yellow and red petals in two unequal lobes, the fruit an elongated capsule.

== Description ==
Plants in the genus Lechenaultia are glabrous shrubs or herbs with spreading branches, linear or cylindrical leaves, the leaves sometimes reduced to scales. The flowers are more or less sessile with five sepals that are free from each other, and five glabrous blue, white or yellow and red petals. The petals are glabrous, the two at the back of the flower shorter with narrow wings near the tip, and the lower three longer with broad wings. The fruit is a cylindrical capsule with four valves.

== Taxonomy ==
The genus Lechenaultia was first formally described in 1810 by Robert Brown in Prodromus Florae Novae Hollandiae et Insulae Van Diemen. The genus name honours Jean Baptiste Leschenault de la Tour, the botanist attached to the Baudin expedition to Australia. Brown had met Leschenault and assumed to spell his name the French way without the 's', however, George Bentham introduced the German spelling with the 's' and subsequent writers followed suit as the name was written Leschenaultia, but reverted to Robert Brown's spelling in the 1950s.

The type species is Lechenaultia formosa.

== Distribution and habitat ==
The majority of Lechenaultia species occur in the south-west of Western Australia and most of these occur in shrubland. Lechenaultia biloba grows in forests, and inland species occur in open grassland or woodland. Some species particularly adapted to arid conditions extend across central Australia as far as inland New South Wales, while L. filiformis is found across northern Australia to New Guinea. All species grow in well-drained, sandy soil apart from L. expansa, which grows in permanently wet soil.

== Ecology and fertilisation mechanism ==
Charles Darwin studied fertilisation in Lechenaultia and suggested that the upper anther "has been converted into a short broad strap" preventing the stigma from receiving pollen from the fertile anthers of the same flower, thus preventing self-fertilisation.

== Species list ==
The following is a list of Lechenaultia species accepted by the Australian Plant Census as at January 2022:

Lechenaultia acutiloba Benth. – wingless leschenaultia (W.A.)
Lechenaultia aphylla D.A.Morrison (W.A., S.A.)
Lechenaultia biloba Lindl. – blue leschenaultia (W.A.)
Lechenaultia brevifolia D.A.Morrison (W.A.)
Lechenaultia chlorantha F.Muell. – Kalbarri leschenaultia (W.A.)
Lechenaultia divaricata F.Muell. (N.T., S.A., Qld., N.S.W.)
Lechenaultia expansa R.Br. (W.A.)
Lechenaultia filiformis R.Br. (W.A., N.T., Qld., New Guinea)
Lechenaultia floribunda Benth. – free-flowering leschenaultia (W.A.)
Lechenaultia formosa R.Br. – red leschenaultia (W.A.)
Lechenaultia galactites L.W.Sage – white leschenaultia (W.A.)
Lechenaultia heteromera Benth. – claw leschenaultia (W.A.)
Lechenaultia hirsuta F.Muell. – hairy leschenaultia (W.A.)
Lechenaultia hortii L.W.Sage – Hort's leschenaultia (W.A.)
Lechenaultia juncea E.Pritz. – reed-like leschenaultia (W.A.)
Lechenaultia laricina Lindl. – scarlet leschenaultia (W.A.)
Lechenaultia linarioides DC. – yellow leschenaultia (W.A.)
Lechenaultia longiloba F.Muell. – Irwin leschenaultia (W.A.)
Lechenaultia lutescens D.A.Morrison & Carolin (W.A., N.T.)
Lechenaultia macrantha K.Krause – wreath leschenaultia (W.A.)
Lechenaultia magnifica L.W.Sage – magnificent leschenaultia (W.A.)
Lechenaultia mimica M.D.Barrett & R.L.Barrett (W.A.)
Lechenaultia ovata D.A.Morrison (N.T.)
Lechenaultia papillata D.A.Morrison (W.A.)
Lechenaultia pulvinaris C.A.Gardner – cushion leschenaultia (W.A.)
Lechenaultia stenosepala E.Pritz. – narrow-sepaled leschenaultia (W.A.)
Lechenaultia striata F.Muell. (W.A., N.T., S.A.)
Lechenaultia subcymosa C.A.Gardner & A.S.George – wide-branching leschenaultia (W.A.)
Lechenaultia superba F.Muell. – Barrens leschenaultia (W.A.)
Lechenaultia tubiflora R.Br. – heath leschenaultia (W.A.)

In 2021, Russell Lindsay Barrett and Richard W. Jobson described L. peregrina, a new species from northern Australia, New Guinea and the Moluccas, but as of January 2022, the name has not yet been accepted by the Australian Plant Census.
