= Lechenaultia galactites =

White leschenaultia

Conservation status
- Priority Three — Poorly Known Taxa (DEC)

Scientific classification
- Kingdom: Plantae
- Clade: Tracheophytes
- Clade: Angiosperms
- Clade: Eudicots
- Clade: Asterids
- Order: Asterales
- Family: Goodeniaceae
- Genus: Lechenaultia
- Species: L. galactites

Binomial name
- Lechenaultia galactites L.W.Sage

Species of flowering plant

Lechenaultia galactites, commonly known as white leschenaultia, is a species of flowering plant in the family Goodeniaceae and is endemic to the south-west of Western Australia. It is an erect, robust subshrub or shrub with crowded, narrowly oblong to egg-shaped leaves, and white to pale blue flowers.

== Description ==
Lechenaultia galactites is an erect, robust subshrub or shrub that typically grows to a height of 60 cm (24 in). Its leaves are crowded, especially on the lower stems, narrowly oblong to egg-shaped, 2.0–7.6 mm (0.079–0.299 in) long and about 1 mm (0.039 in) wide. The flowers are arranged in groups near the ends of branchlets, and have linear sepals 4.5–9 mm (0.18–0.35 in) long. The petals are white to creamy-white or pale blue, about 25 mm (0.98 in) long and have long, soft hairs inside the petal tube. The petal lobes are more or less equal in size, the upper lobes up to 10 mm (0.39 in) wide and the lower lobes about 12 mm (0.47 in) long with wings up to about 4 mm (0.16 in) wide. Flowers have been collected from June to October, with an apparent peak in September.

== Taxonomy ==
Lechenaultia galactites was first formally described in 2006 by Leigh W. Sage in the journal Nuytsia from specimens collected in the Kokardine area in 1999. The specific epithet (galactites) means "milk-like", referring to the colour of the flowers.

== Distribution and habitat ==
White leschenaultia grows in kwongan in the Avon Wheatbelt and Swan Coastal Plain biogeographic regions of south-western Western Australia.

== Conservation status ==
This leschenaultia is listed as "Priority Three" by the Government of Western Australia Department of Biodiversity, Conservation and Attractions, meaning that it is poorly known and known from only a few locations but is not under imminent threat.
