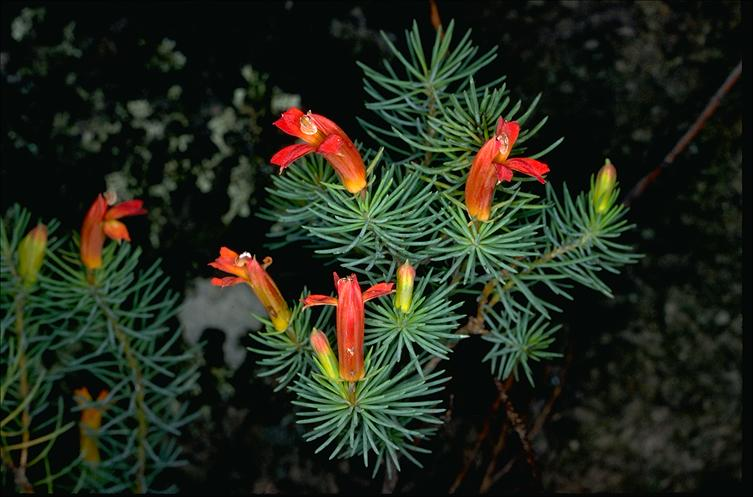

Conservation status
- Priority Four — Rare Taxa (DEC)

Scientific classification
- Kingdom: Plantae
- Clade: Tracheophytes
- Clade: Angiosperms
- Clade: Eudicots
- Clade: Asterids
- Order: Asterales
- Family: Goodeniaceae
- Genus: Lechenaultia
- Species: L. superba

Binomial name
- Lechenaultia superba F.Muell.

= Lechenaultia superba =

Species of shrub

Lechenaultia superba, commonly known as Barrens leschenaultia, is a species of flowering plant in the family Goodeniaceae and is endemic to near-coastal areas of southern Western Australia. It is an erect, spreading shrub with crowded, narrow, fleshy leaves and yellow, red, or yellow and orange flowers.

== Description ==
Lechenaultia superba is an erect, spreading shrub that typically grows to a height of 30–70 cm (12–28 in) and has rough bark. The leaves are crowded, fleshy, 11.0–22.5 mm (0.43–0.89 in) long and narrow. The flowers are arranged singly on the ends of branchlets and are yellow, red, or yellow and orange. The sepals are 6.0–7.5 mm (0.24–0.30 in) long and the petals 17–23 mm (0.67–0.91 in) long with soft hairs inside the petal tube. The wings on the lower petal lobes are 1.7–2.8 mm (0.067–0.110 in) wide and on the upper lobes 0.9–1.3 mm (0.035–0.051 in) wide. Flowering mostly occurs from August to November, and the fruit is 13–20 mm (0.51–0.79 in) long.

== Taxonomy ==
Lechenaultia superba was first formally described in 1867 by Ferdinand von Mueller in his Fragmenta Phytographiae Australiae from specimens collected near the Phillips River. The specific epithet (superba) means "splendid".

== Distribution and habitat ==
This leschenaultia grows in scrub on rocky hillsides near East Mount Barren in the Esperance Plains biogeographic region.

== Conservation status ==
Barrens leschenaultia is listed as "Priority Four" by the Government of Western Australia Department of Biodiversity, Conservation and Attractions, meaning that it is rare or near threatened.
