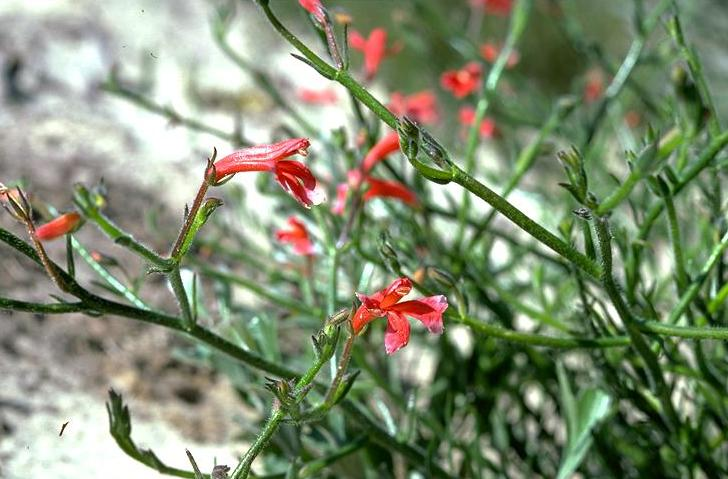

Scientific classification
- Kingdom: Plantae
- Clade: Tracheophytes
- Clade: Angiosperms
- Clade: Eudicots
- Clade: Asterids
- Order: Asterales
- Family: Goodeniaceae
- Genus: Lechenaultia
- Species: L. hirsuta

Binomial name
- Lechenaultia hirsuta F.Muell.

= Lechenaultia hirsuta =

Hairy leschenaultia

Species of flowering plant

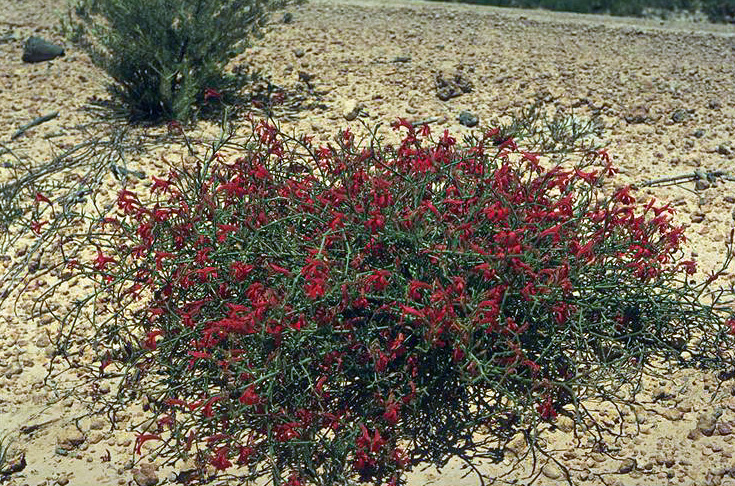
Habit

Lechenaultia hirsuta, commonly known as hairy leschenaultia, is a species of flowering plant in the family Goodeniaceae and is endemic to the west of Western Australia. It is a straggling, low-lying shrub with few branches, fleshy leaves, and scarlet flowers.

== Description ==
Lechenaultia hirsuta is a straggling, low lying shrub or subshrub that typically grows to a height of 70 cm (28 in) and has a few branches. Its leaves are fleshy, narrow, usually 17.5–27 mm (0.69–1.06 in) long with a few bristly hairs. The flowers are arranged in small groups and have sepals 7.0–8.5 mm (0.28–0.33 in) long, densely covered with bristly hairs. The petals are scarlet, 29–36 mm (1.1–1.4 in) long with glandular hairs on the back and long, soft hairs inside the petal tube. The petal lobes are more or less the same size, the wings on the lower lobes 3–5 mm (0.12–0.20 in) wide, and on the upper lobes rounded and 0.9–1.5 mm (0.035–0.059 in) wide. Flowering occurs from August to December and the fruit is bristly-hairy and 35–42 mm (1.4–1.7 in) long.

== Taxonomy ==
Lechenaultia hirsuta was first formally described in 1868 by Ferdinand von Mueller in Flora Australiensis from specimens collected by James Drummond. The specific epithet (hirsuta) means "hirsute", referring to the whole plant.

== Distribution and habitat ==
Hairy leschenaultia usually grows in low, open heath, and occurs between Kalbarri and Badgingarra in the Geraldton Sandplains, Swan Coastal Plain and Yalgoo biogeographic regions of western Western Australia.

== Conservation status ==
This leschenaultia is listed as "not threatened" by the Government of Western Australia Department of Biodiversity, Conservation and Attractions.
