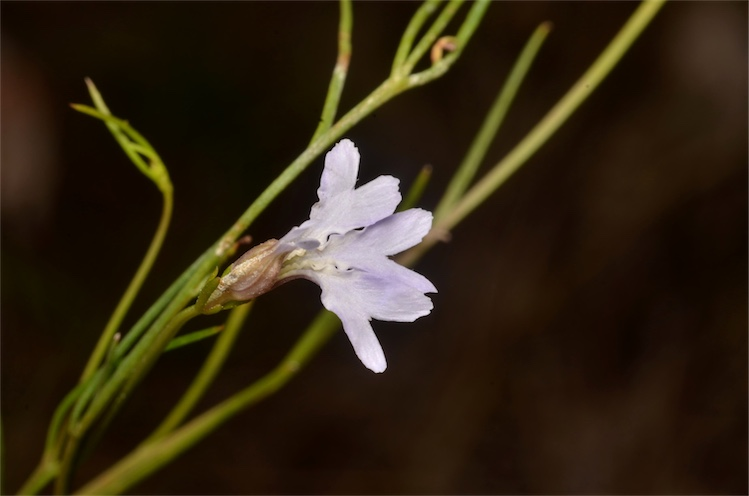
- Near Cardwell, Queensland

Scientific classification
- Kingdom: Plantae
- Clade: Tracheophytes
- Clade: Angiosperms
- Clade: Eudicots
- Clade: Asterids
- Order: Asterales
- Family: Goodeniaceae
- Genus: Lechenaultia
- Species: L. filiformis

Binomial name
- Lechenaultia filiformis R.Br.

Synonyms
- Latouria filiformis (R.Br.) de Vriese; Lechenaultia agrostophylla F.Muell.; Leschenaultia agrostophylla F.Muell. orth. var.

= Lechenaultia filiformis =

Species of flowering plant

Lechenaultia filiformis is a species of flowering plant in the family Goodeniaceae and is native to northern Australia and New Guinea. It is a grasslike, ascending herb with scattered, narrow, fleshy leaves and pale purple-blue to creamy-white, tube-shaped flowers.

== Description ==
Lechenaultia filiformis is a grass-like, ascending herb with few branches and that typically grows to a height of up to 40 cm (16 in). Its leaves are scattered, 12.5–24 mm (0.49–0.94 in) long, narrow and fleshy. The flowers are arranged in loose clusters, the sepals 3.0–8.5 mm (0.12–0.33 in) long and the petals 11–18 mm (0.43–0.71 in) long, purple, pale blue or creamy-white, and joined at the base to form a white or yellow tube. The petal wings on the upper lobes are rounded, usually 0.5–2.5 mm (0.020–0.098 in) wide and on the lower lobes usually 1.3–3.5 mm (0.051–0.138 in) wide. Flowering occurs sporadically and the fruit is 25–50 mm (0.98–1.97 in) long.

== Taxonomy ==
Lechenaultia filiformis was first formally described in 1810 by Robert Brown in his Prodromus Florae Novae Hollandiae et Insulae Van Diemen. The specific epithet (filiformis) means "thread-like".

== Distribution and habitat ==
This lechenaultia grows in spinifex grassland or in woodland from the Kimberley region of northern Western Australia through the north of the Northern Territory to the Cape York Peninsula in Queensland and the coast of New Guinea.
