= Lechenaultia mimica =

Conservation status
- Priority One — Poorly Known Taxa (DEC)

Scientific classification
- Kingdom: Plantae
- Clade: Tracheophytes
- Clade: Angiosperms
- Clade: Eudicots
- Clade: Asterids
- Order: Asterales
- Family: Goodeniaceae
- Genus: Lechenaultia
- Species: L. mimica

Binomial name
- Lechenaultia mimica M.D.Barrett & R.L.Barrett

Species of flowering plant

Lechenaultia mimica is a species of flowering plant in the family Goodeniaceae and is endemic to the Kimberley region of Western Australia. It was first formally described in 2015 by Matthew David Barrett and Russell Lindsay Barrett in Australian Systematic Botany from material they collected in 2008. The specific epithet (mimica) means "imitating", referring to the similar Lindernia hypandra with which it grows. The species is only known from the Northern Kimberley region of north-western Western Australia.

This lechenaultia is listed as "Priority One" by the Government of Western Australia Department of Biodiversity, Conservation and Attractions, meaning that it is known from only one or a few locations that are potentially at risk.
