= Max Koch =

Australian botanist (1854–1925)

Maxwell "Max" Koch (17 July 1854 – 1 April 1925) was a German-born Australian botanical collector.

== Biography ==
Born in Berlin, Koch was apprenticed to a merchant's office, but, not liking the work, joined the crew of a Glasgow-based sailing ship at Bremerhaven. Koch disembarked at Port Augusta, South Australia in April 1878, taking work at a wheat farm. Later he moved to Mount Lyndhurst sheep station, where he remained for many years. Around 1896 he began serious botanical collecting.

Koch visited Germany around 1902–1903, then returned to Australia, and in 1904 moved to the extreme south-west of Western Australia, where he spent the next 17 years working in the timber industry. By that time he had a large family, and he supplemented his income by plant specimens, and, in his later years, seed. He died at Pemberton, Western Australia in 1925.

== Legacy ==
During his lifetime, Koch very highly regarded by botanists, who considered him to be an outstanding botanical collector. In total his collections amount to about 820 species in South Australia and 2880 in Western Australia. These went to a range of botanists, herbaria, and botanic gardens, including Joseph Henry Maiden in Sydney (who used Koch's specimens as exchange material), the botanic gardens at Adelaide and Brisbane, and several overseas recipients. More than 40 plant species were published from specimens collected by him, including Lechenaultia macrantha, Eucalyptus brachycorys and Eucalyptus kochii. The last of these was named in his honour, as were species of several other genera, including Acacia, Aizoon, Scirpus, Thryptomene and Zygophyllum. Specimens collected by Koch are cared for at the National Herbarium of Victoria (MEL), Royal Botanic Gardens Victoria.
