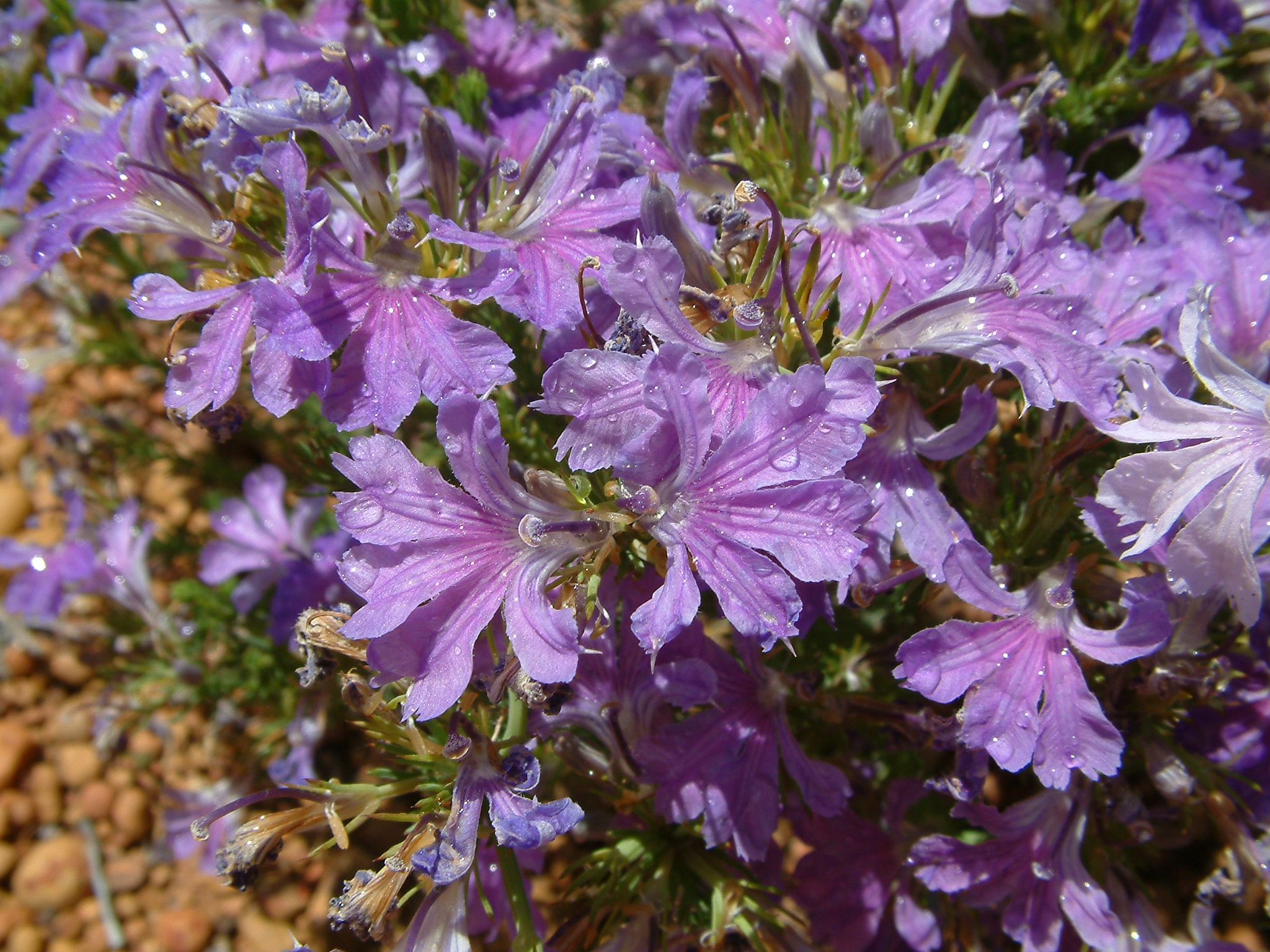
- Lechenaultia magnifica

Conservation status
- Priority One — Poorly Known Taxa (DEC)

Scientific classification
- Kingdom: Plantae
- Clade: Tracheophytes
- Clade: Angiosperms
- Clade: Eudicots
- Clade: Asterids
- Order: Asterales
- Family: Goodeniaceae
- Genus: Lechenaultia
- Species: L. magnifica

Binomial name
- Lechenaultia magnifica L.W.Sage

= Lechenaultia magnifica =

Magnificent leschenaultia

Species of flowering plant

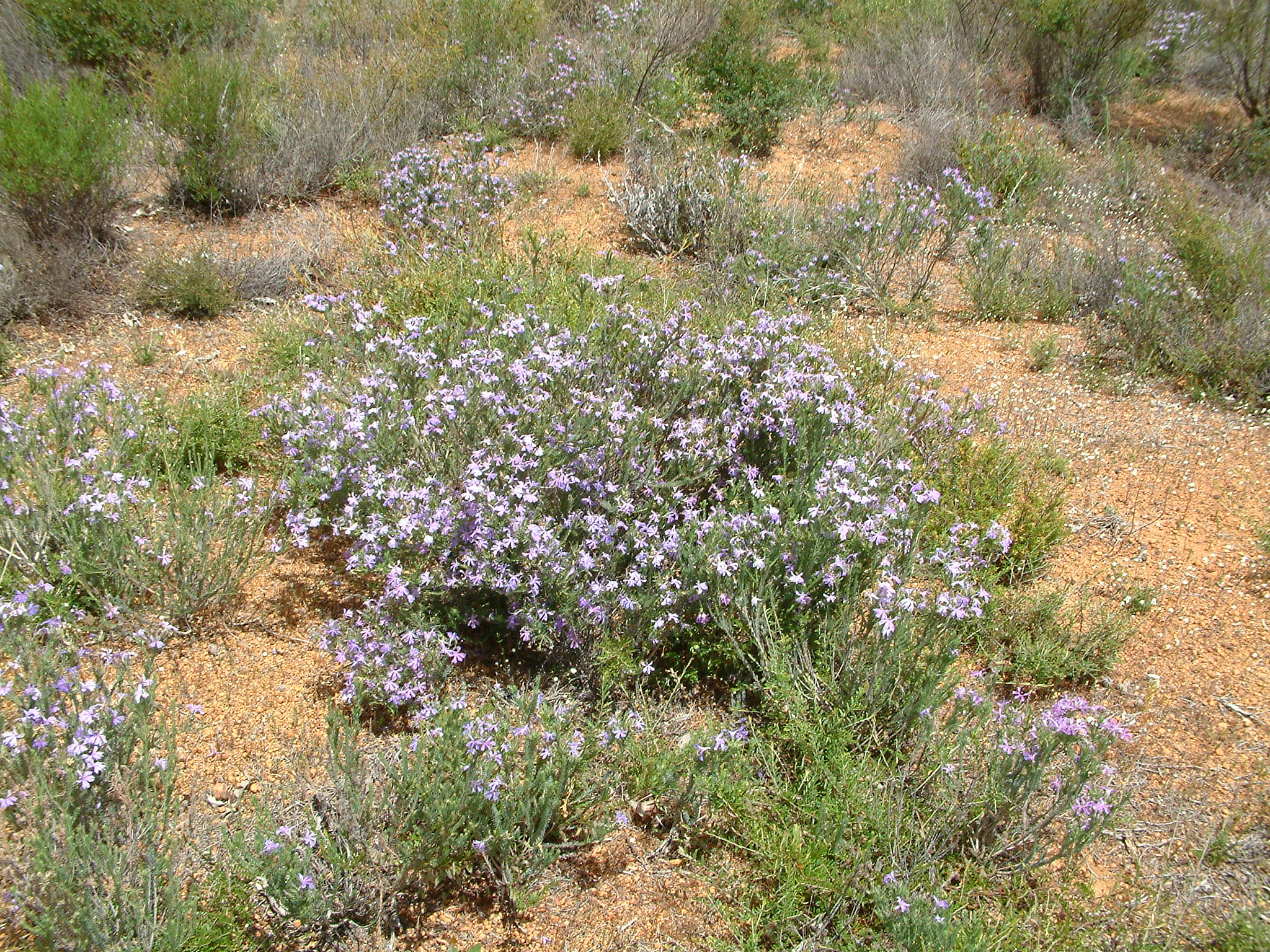
Habit

Lechenaultia magnifica, commonly known as magnificent leschenaultia, is a species of flowering plant in the family Goodeniaceae and is endemic to the south-west of Western Australia. It is an erect, perennial herb or subshrub with crowded, linear to narrowly lance-shaped leaves, and pink to mauve or purple flowers.

== Description ==
Lechenaultia magnifica is an erect, perennial herb or subshrub that typically grows to a height of up to 60 cm (24 in) and has pimply foliage. The leaves are crowded, linear to narrowly lance-shaped, 2.5–12 mm (0.098–0.472 in) long and 0.4–0.5 mm (0.016–0.020 in) wide, but longer near the flowers. The flowers are arranged in compact groups, the sepals more or less linear, 6.0–8.5 mm (0.24–0.33 in) long and the petals 16–30 mm (0.63–1.18 in) long, pink to mauve or purple with long, soft hairs inside the petal tube. The petal lobes are 5–9 mm (0.20–0.35 in) long, the upper lobes erect with wings 0.5–2 mm (0.020–0.079 in) wide, the lower lobes 6–10 mm (0.24–0.39 in) long and 1.5–4.0 mm (0.059–0.157 in) wide. Flowering has been observed in November, and the fruit is 17–28 mm (0.67–1.10 in) long.

== Taxonomy ==
Lechenaultia magnifica was first formally described in 2006 by Leigh William Sage in the journal Nuytsia from material collected by Fred Hort near Bindoon in 2002. The specific epithet (magnifica) means "splendid" or "magnificent", referring to the floral display of this species.

== Distribution and habitat ==
Magnificent lechenaultia is only known from the Bindoon area in south-western Western Australia where it grows in open woodland.

== Conservation status ==
This lechenaultia is listed as "Priority One" by the Government of Western Australia Department of Biodiversity, Conservation and Attractions, meaning that it is known from only one or a few locations that are potentially at risk.
