= Lechenaultia striata =

Scientific classification
- Kingdom: Plantae
- Clade: Tracheophytes
- Clade: Angiosperms
- Clade: Eudicots
- Clade: Asterids
- Order: Asterales
- Family: Goodeniaceae
- Genus: Lechenaultia
- Species: L. striata

Binomial name
- Lechenaultia striata F.Muell.

Species of shrub

Lechenaultia striata is a species of flowering plant in the family Goodeniaceae and is endemic to arid inland areas of Australia. It is an ascending herb or subshrub with only a few wand-like branches, crowded, narrow fleshy leaves and pale blue to pale yellow or creamy-white flowers.

== Description ==
Lechenaultia striata is an ascending herb or subshrub that typically grows to a height of 60 cm (24 in) and has only a few wand-like branches. The leaves are crowded on short leafy stems, scattered on flowering stems and are 10.5–20.5 mm (0.41–0.81 in) long but narrow. The flowers are arranged in loose groups and are pale blue to pale yellow or creamy-white. The sepals are 4.5–7.5 mm (0.18–0.30 in) long and the petals 14–18 mm (0.55–0.71 in) long with soft hairs inside the petal tube and spreading lobes. The wings on the lower lobes are 2–3 mm (0.079–0.118 in) wide and on the upper lobes 0.1–0.3 mm (0.0039–0.0118 in) wide. Flowering occurs sporadically in response to rainfall, and the fruit is 23–37 mm (0.91–1.46 in) long.

== Taxonomy ==
Lechenaultia striata was first formally described in 1874 by Ferdinand von Mueller in his Fragmenta Phytographiae Australiae from specimens collected near the Olgas by Ernest Giles. The specific epithet (striata) means "striated", referring to the stems and leaves.

== Distribution and habitat ==
This leschenaultia grows inTriodia grassland or scrub in arid and semi-arid areas of eastern Western Australia, western inland South Australia and south-western Northern Territory.

== Conservation status ==
This leschenaultia is listed as "not threatened" by the Government of Western Australia Department of Biodiversity, Conservation and Attractions.
