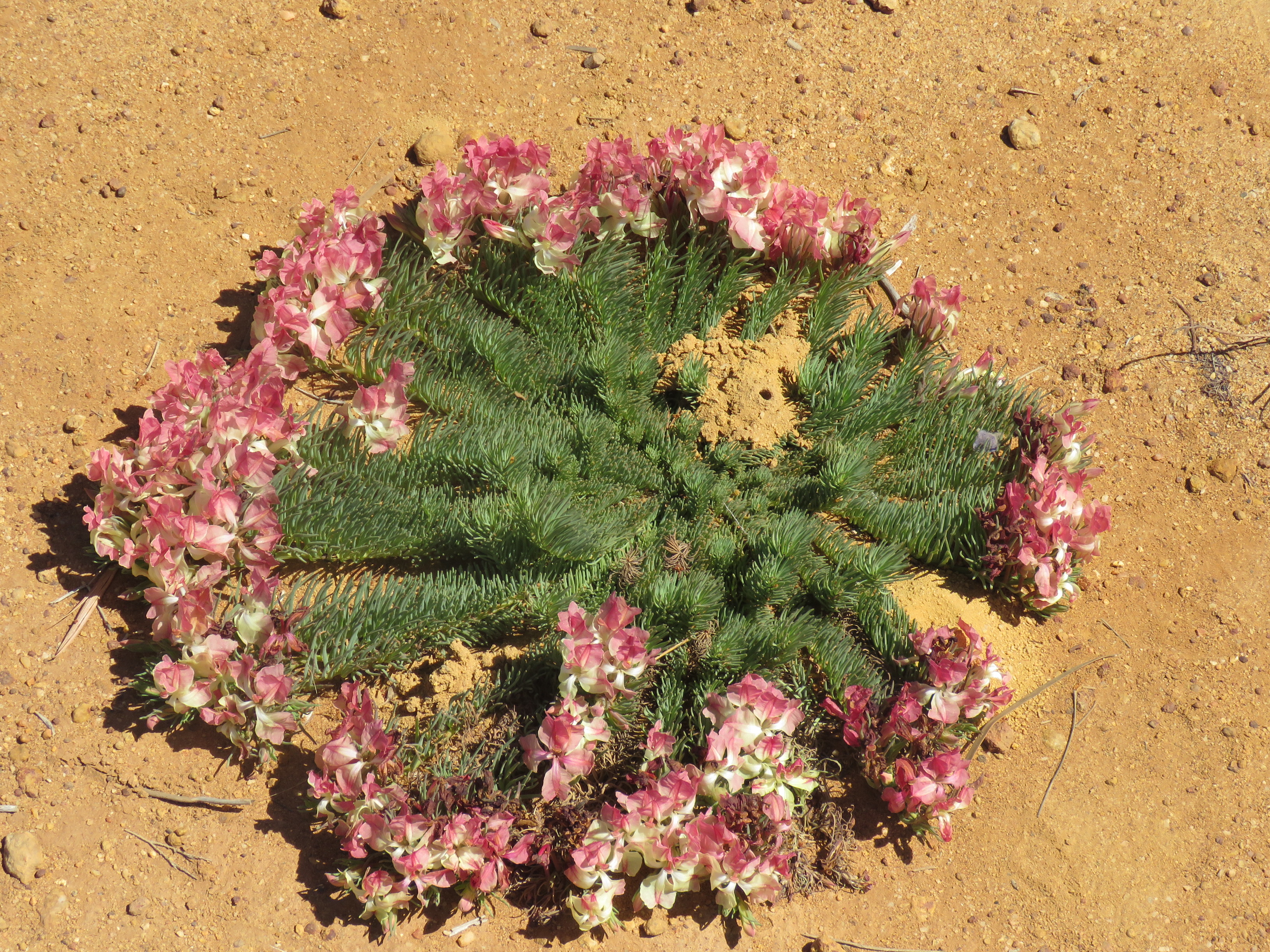
- Lechenaultia macrantha near Mullewa
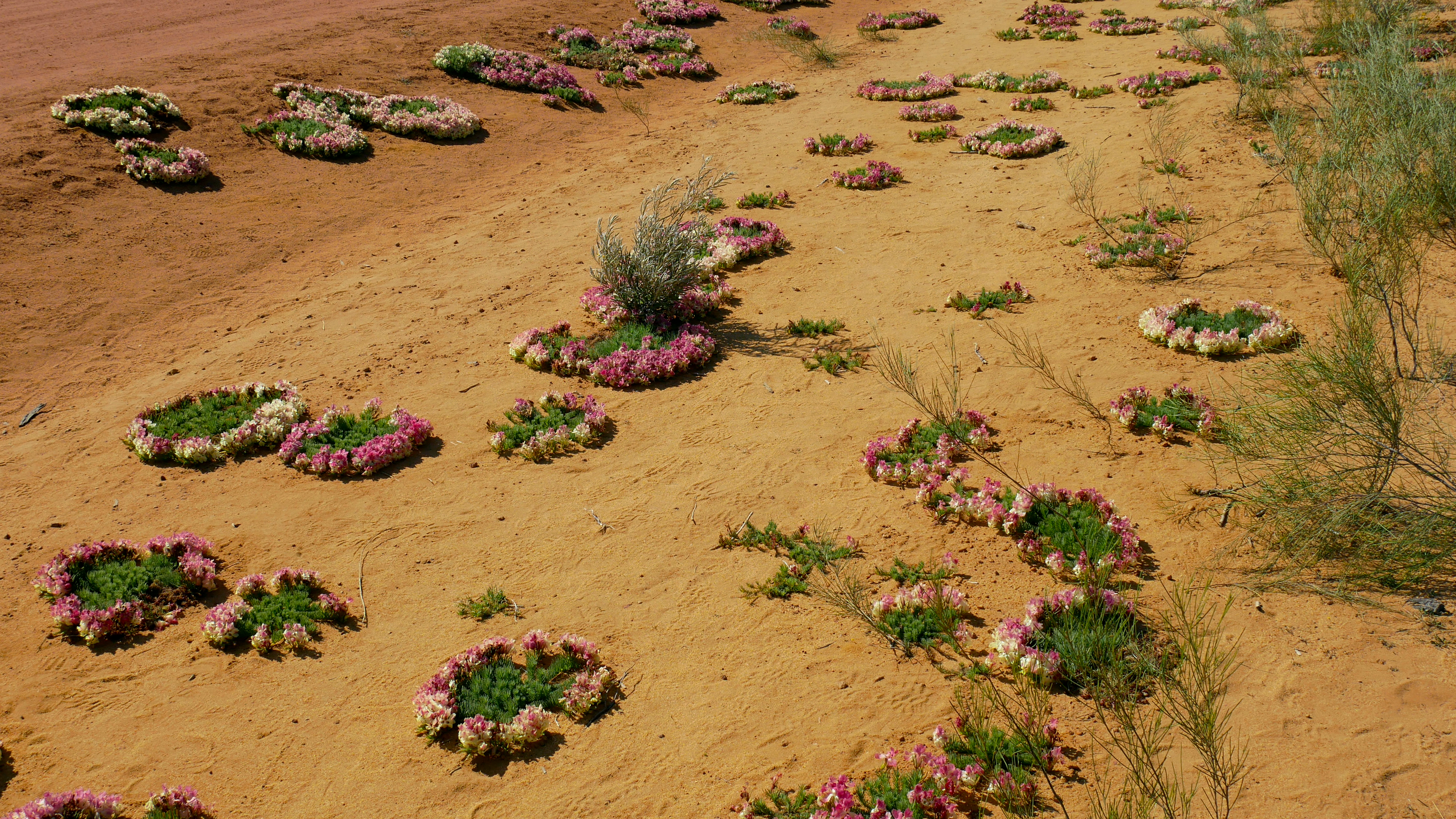

Scientific classification
- Kingdom: Plantae
- Clade: Tracheophytes
- Clade: Angiosperms
- Clade: Eudicots
- Clade: Asterids
- Order: Asterales
- Family: Goodeniaceae
- Genus: Lechenaultia
- Species: L. macrantha

Binomial name
- Lechenaultia macrantha K.Krause

= Lechenaultia macrantha =

Wreath leschenaultia

Species of flowering plant

Lechenaultia macrantha, commonly known as wreath leschenaultia, is a species of flowering plant in the family Goodeniaceae and is endemic to inland areas of south-western Western Australia. It is a low-lying, wreath-like herb or subshrub with narrow, rather fleshy leaves, and yellow petals with deep pink or red wings.

== Description ==
Lechenaultia macrantha is a wreath-like, low-lying, mostly glabrous herb or subshrub with few branches, typically up to 15 cm (5.9 in) high and about 1 m (3 ft 3 in) in diameter. The leaves are crowded, narrow, rather fleshy and 25–45 mm (0.98–1.77 in) long. The flowers are arranged in compact groups, the sepals 20.5–33 mm (0.81–1.30 in) long and the petals 25–35 mm (0.98–1.38 in) long and densely hairy inside the petal tube. The petals are yellow with deep pink or red wings 4.5–8.5 mm (0.18–0.33 in) wide. The upper petal lobes are erect, the lower lobes spreading. Flowering occurs from August to November, and the fruit is 22–33 mm (0.87–1.30 in) long.

== Taxonomy ==
Lechenaultia macrantha was first formally described in 1912 by Kurt Krause in Adolf Engler's journal Das Pflanzenreich from material collected by Max Koch near Wubin in 1905. The specific epithet (macrantha) means "large-flowered".

== Distribution and habitat ==
Wreath lechenaultia grows in open areas in sandy or gravelly soil between Tallering Peak on Tallering Station and Coorow, and near Nerren Nerren Station near Kalbarri and Boolardy Station, in the Avon Wheatbelt, Geraldton Sandplains, Murchison and Yalgoo biogeographic regions of inland south-western Western Australia.

== Conservation status ==
This lechenaultia is listed as "not threatened" by the Government of Western Australia Department of Biodiversity, Conservation and Attractions.

== Use in horticulture ==
Lechenaultia macrantha is not well-known in cultivation and is difficult to maintain for more than a couple of years. It is readily propagated from cuttings and may be grown in a well-drained pot.
