= Lechenaultia subcymosa =

Wide-branching leschenaultia

Scientific classification
- Kingdom: Plantae
- Clade: Tracheophytes
- Clade: Angiosperms
- Clade: Eudicots
- Clade: Asterids
- Order: Asterales
- Family: Goodeniaceae
- Genus: Lechenaultia
- Species: L. subcymosa

Binomial name
- Lechenaultia subcymosa C.A.Gardner & A.S.George

Species of shrub

Lechenaultia subcymosa, commonly known as wide-branching leschenaultia, is a species of flowering plant in the family Goodeniaceae, endemic to the far west of Western Australia. It is an ascending herb or subshrub with only a few widely spreading branches, narrow, rigid leaves crowded on short, leafy stems, and creamy-white to pale mauve flowers.

== Description ==
Lechenaultia subcymosa is an ascending herb or subshrub that typically grows to a height of up to 30 cm (12 in) and has only a few widely spreading branches. The leaves are narrow, rigid, 7–11.5 mm (0.28–0.45 in) long and scattered on flowering stems, crowded on short, leafy stems. The flowers are creamy-white to pale mauve, the sepals 1.0–2.5 mm (0.039–0.098 in) long, and the petals 14–19 mm (0.55–0.75 in) long with soft hairs inside the petal tube. The wings on the lower lobes are 1–3 mm (0.039–0.118 in) wide, and on the upper lobes are 0.2–0.6 mm (0.0079–0.0236 in) wide. Flowering occurs sporadically in response to rainfall, and the fruit is 19–33 mm (0.75–1.30 in) long.

== Taxonomy ==
Lechenaultia subcymosa was first formally described in 1963 by Charles Gardner and Alex George in the Journal of the Royal Society of Western Australia from specimens collected by George near Learmonth in 1962. The specific epithet (subcymosa) means "somewhat cymose".

== Distribution and habitat ==
Wide-branching leschenaultia grows in shallow soil over limestone in low shrubland in near-coastal areas on the North West Cape and on islands in Shark Bay, in the Carnarvon, Geraldton Sandplains, and Yalgoo biogeographic regions of far Western Australia.

== Conservation status ==
This lechenaultia is listed as "not threatened" by the Government of Western Australia Department of Biodiversity, Conservation and Attractions.
