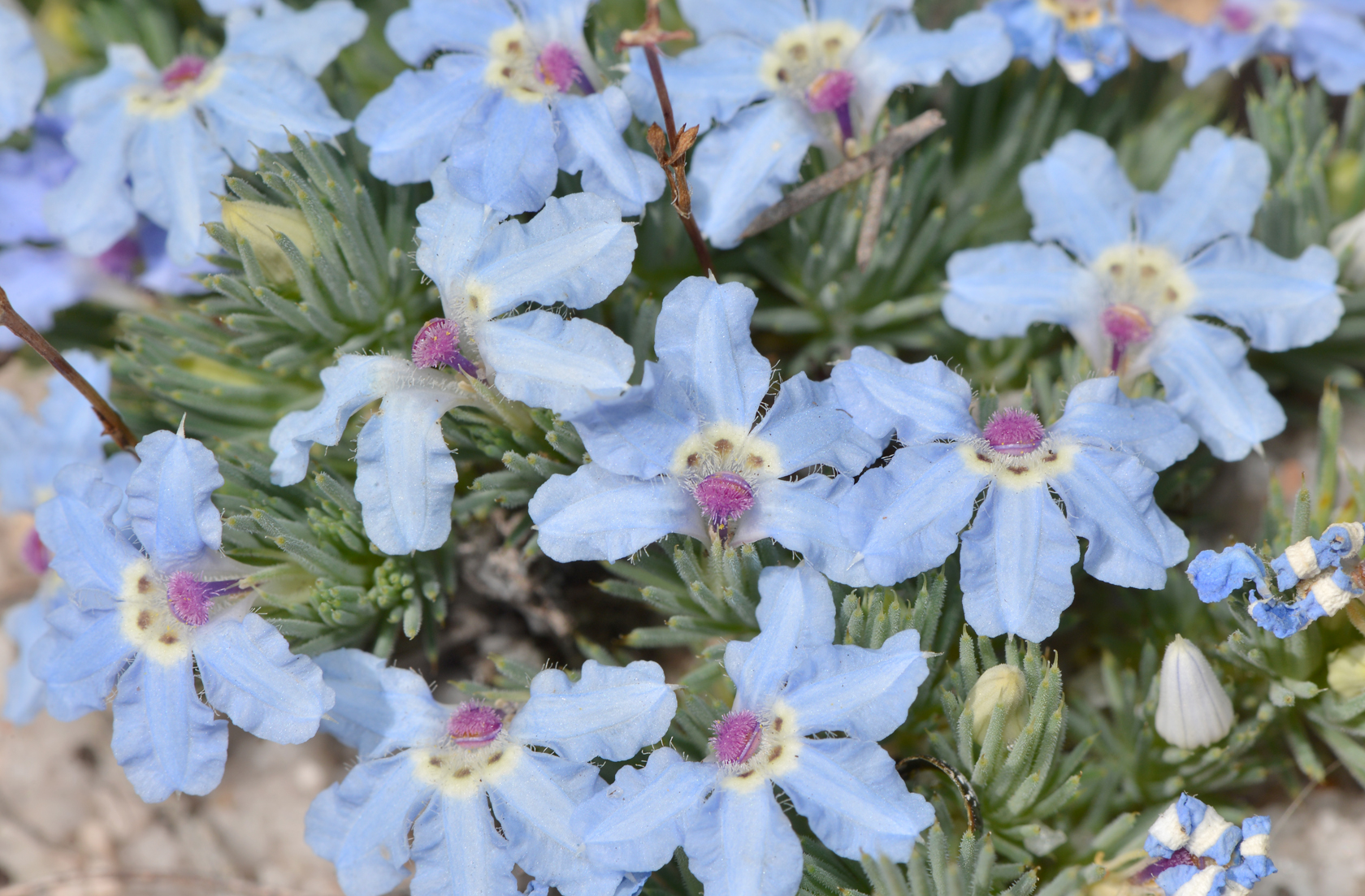
- Lechenaultia pulvinaris

Conservation status
- Priority Four — Rare Taxa (DEC)

Scientific classification
- Kingdom: Plantae
- Clade: Tracheophytes
- Clade: Angiosperms
- Clade: Eudicots
- Clade: Asterids
- Order: Asterales
- Family: Goodeniaceae
- Genus: Lechenaultia
- Species: L. pulvinaris

Binomial name
- Lechenaultia pulvinaris C.A.Gardner

= Lechenaultia pulvinaris =

Cushion leschenaultia

Species of shrub

Lechenaultia pulvinaris, commonly known as cushion leschenaultia, is a species of flowering plant in the family Goodeniaceae and is endemic to inland areas of south-western Western Australia. It is a low-lying, hemispherical shrub with narrow, rigid, crowded, hairy leaves, and pale blue or purple flowers.

== Description ==
Lechenaultia pulvinaris is a low-lying, hemispherical shrub that typically grows to a height of 3–20 cm (1.2–7.9 in) and has narrow, rigid, woolly-hairy leaves 4.5–8.5 mm (0.18–0.33 in) long. The flowers are pale blue or purple, each flower on a pedicel 2–4 mm (0.079–0.157 in) long, the sepals 3.5–4.0 mm (0.14–0.16 in) long and the petals 9–11 mm (0.35–0.43 in) long with soft hairs inside the petal tube. The wings on the lobes are more or less equal and 0.8–1.0 mm (0.031–0.039 in) wide. Flowering occurs from October to December, and the fruit is 5–7 mm (0.20–0.28 in) long.

== Taxonomy ==
Lechenaultia pulvinaris was first formally described in 1964 by Charles Gardner in the Journal of the Royal Society of Western Australia from specimens he collected near Corrigin. The specific epithet (pulvinaris) means "resembling a cushion".

== Distribution and habitat ==
Cushion leschenaultia grows in open patches of sand in low scrub between Corrigin and Wagin in the Avon Wheatbelt and Jarrah Forest biogeographic regions of south-western Western Australia.

== Conservation status ==
This leschenaultia is listed as "Priority Four" by the Government of Western Australia Department of Biodiversity, Conservation and Attractions, meaning that it is rare or near threatened.
