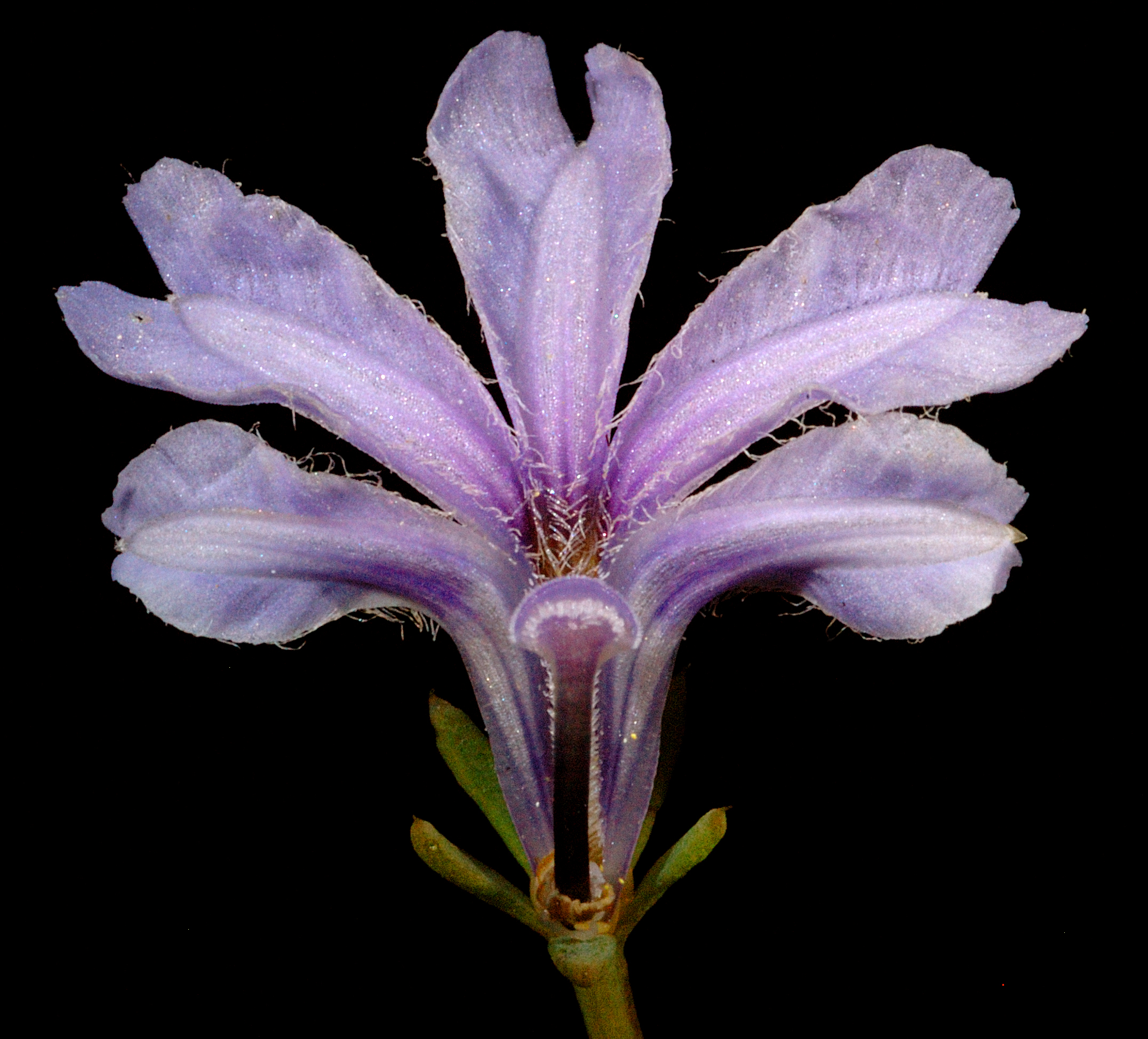
- Lechenaultia floribunda

Scientific classification
- Kingdom: Plantae
- Clade: Tracheophytes
- Clade: Angiosperms
- Clade: Eudicots
- Clade: Asterids
- Order: Asterales
- Family: Goodeniaceae
- Genus: Lechenaultia
- Species: L. floribunda

Binomial name
- Lechenaultia floribunda Benth.

= Lechenaultia floribunda =

Free-flowering leschenaultia

Species of flowering plant

Lechenaultia floribunda, commonly known as free-flowering leschenaultia, is a species of flowering plant in the family Goodeniaceae and is endemic to the south-west of Western Australia. It is an openly-branched shrub or subshrub with crowded, narrow, fleshy leaves and compact groups of pale blue to pale mauve or creamy white flowers.

== Description ==
Lechenaultia floribunda is an openly-branched shrub or subshrub that typically grows up to 1 m (3 ft 3 in) high. Its leaves are crowded, narrow, fleshy and 4.5–7.5 mm (0.18–0.30 in) long. The flowers are arranged in compact groups in leaf axils, and have sepals 3.0–4.5 mm (0.12–0.18 in) long. The petals are pale blue to pale mauve or creamy white, 11–15 mm (0.43–0.59 in) long and softly-hairy inside the tube. The petal lobes are more or less equal in size, the upper lobes 1.3–2.2 mm (0.051–0.087 in) wide and the lower lobes mostly 0.4–0.8 mm (0.016–0.031 in) wide. Flowering occurs from August to December.

== Taxonomy ==
Lechenaultia floribunda was first formally described in 1837 by George Bentham in Enumeratio plantarum quas in Novae Hollandiae ora austro-occidentali ad fluvium Cygnorum et in sinu Regis Georgii collegit Carolus Liber Baro de Hügel from specimens collected near the Swan River by Charles von Hügel. The specific epithet (floribunda) means "flowering profusely".

== Distribution and habitat ==
Free-flowering leschenaultia grows in heath, scrub or woodland and is found in near-coastal areas between Kalbarri and Perth, and inland as far as Wongan Hills in the Avon Wheatbelt, Carnarvon, Geraldton Sandplains, Jarrah Forest, Swan Coastal Plain and Warren biogeographic regions of south-western Western Australia.

== Conservation status ==
Lechenaultia floribunda is listed as "not threatened" by the Government of Western Australia Department of Biodiversity, Conservation and Attractions.
