= Lechenaultia ovata =

Scientific classification
- Kingdom: Plantae
- Clade: Tracheophytes
- Clade: Angiosperms
- Clade: Eudicots
- Clade: Asterids
- Order: Asterales
- Family: Goodeniaceae
- Genus: Lechenaultia
- Species: L. ovata

Binomial name
- Lechenaultia ovata D.A.Morrison

Species of shrub

Lechenaultia ovata is a species of flowering plant in the family Goodeniaceae and is endemic to the Northern Territory. It is a perennial herb with rather fleshy, egg-shaped leaves, and white flowers.

== Description ==
Lechenaultia lutescens is a glabrous, perennial herb up to 10 cm (3.9 in) high and 15 cm (5.9 in) wide with many more or less erect stems. The leaves are egg-shaped, rather fleshy, 7.5–10 mm (0.30–0.39 in) long and 1.6–2.0 mm (0.063–0.079 in) wide. The flowers are arranged singly on the ends of stems, the lower sepal lobes 3–4 mm (0.12–0.16 in) long and the upper lobes 1 mm (0.039 in) longer than the others. The petals are white, 8–10 mm (0.31–0.39 in) long, the upper lobes erect with very narrow wings, the lower lobes spreading with wings 0.7–0.8 mm (0.028–0.031 in) wide. Flowering occurs sporadically, and the fruit is 22–28 mm (0.87–1.10 in) long.

== Taxonomy ==
Lechenaultia ovata was first formally described in 1988 by David A. Morrison in the journal Telopea from specimens collected near Jabiru by Lyndley Craven in 1973. The specific epithet (ovata) means "wider below the middle".

== Distribution and habitat ==
This leschenaultia grows with sedges in sandy depressions in a few places on the Top End of the Northern Territory.

== Conservation status ==
This leschenaultia is listed as of "least concern" under the Northern Territory Territory Parks and Wildlife Conservation Act 1976.
