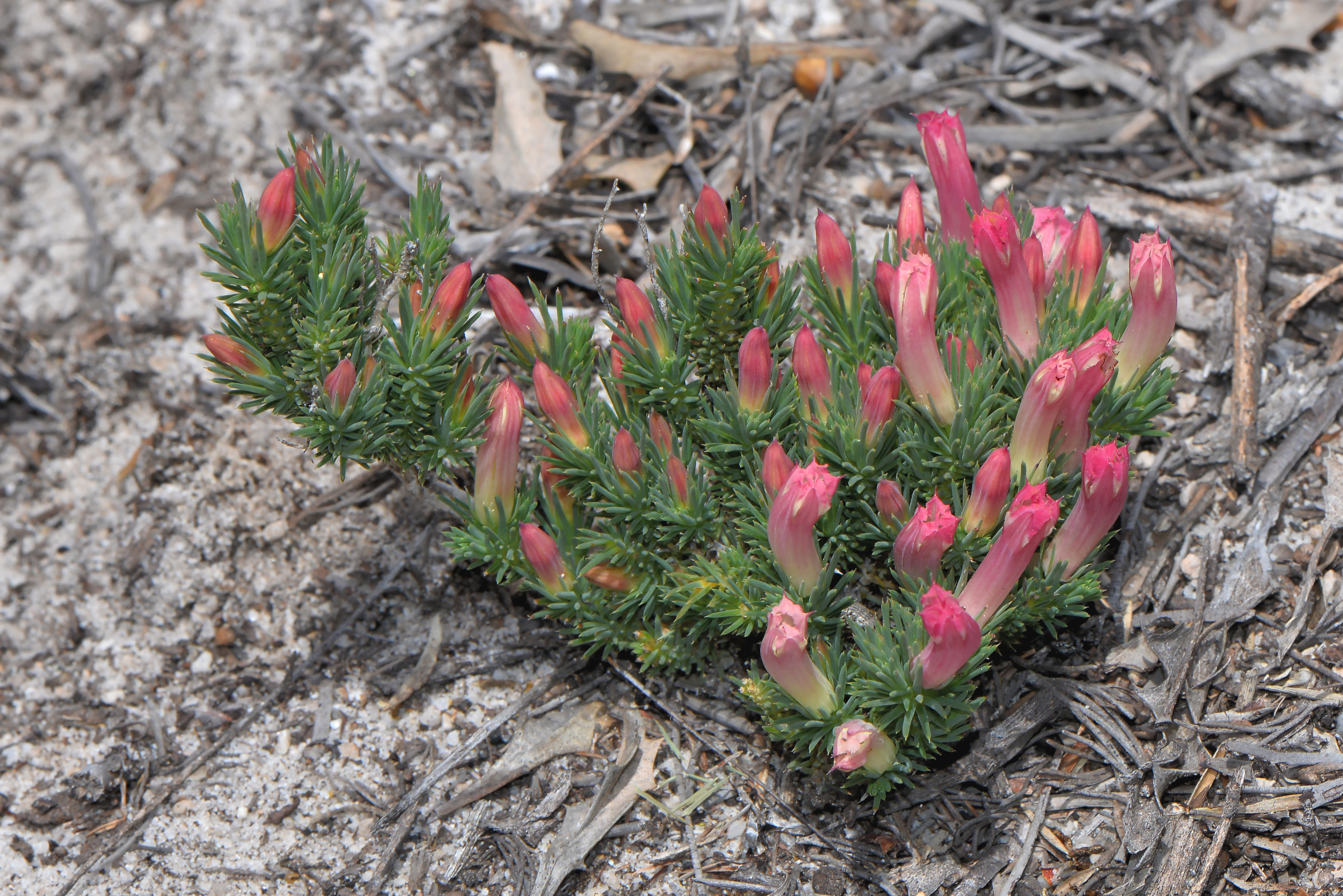

Scientific classification
- Kingdom: Plantae
- Clade: Tracheophytes
- Clade: Angiosperms
- Clade: Eudicots
- Clade: Asterids
- Order: Asterales
- Family: Goodeniaceae
- Genus: Lechenaultia
- Species: L. tubiflora

Binomial name
- Lechenaultia tubiflora R.Br.

Synonyms
- Ericopsis formosus C.A.Gardner; Lechenaultia pinastroides Lehm.; Lechenaultia tubiflora var. purpurea E.Pritz.; Lechenaultia tubiflora R.Br. var. tubiflora; Leschenaultia tubiflora R.Br. orth. var.; Leschenaultia tubiflora var. purpurea E.Pritz. orth. var.

= Lechenaultia tubiflora =

Species of plant

Lechenaultia tubiflora, commonly known as heath leschenaultia, is a species of flowering plant in the family Goodeniaceae and is endemic to the south-west of Western Australia. It is a hemispherical subshrub or more or less erect perennial with crowded, narrow, rigid leaves and variably-coloured, tube-shaped flowers.

== Description ==
Lechenaultia tubiflora is a hemispherical or more or less erect perennial, mostly glabrous subshrub, typically up to 70 cm (28 in) high and 60 cm (24 in) wide with many, often suckering stems. The leaves are crowded, and rigid, 7.5–11.5 mm (0.30–0.45 in) long and narrow. The flowers are arranged singly on the end of branchlets, the sepals 4.0–5.5 mm (0.16–0.22 in) long and the petals forming a bright red, to pale yellow or creamy-white tube. The tube is hairy inside and there are often orange red or blue marks on the petal wings and lobes. The petal lobes are all about the same size with wings 0.3–0.7 mm (0.012–0.028 in) wide. Flowering mainly occurs from August to December and the fruit is 5–7 mm (0.20–0.28 in) long.

== Taxonomy ==
Lechenaultia subcymosa was first formally described in 1810 by Robert Brown in Prodromus Florae Novae Hollandiae et Insulae Van Diemen. The specific epithet (tubiflora) means "tube-flowered".

== Distribution and habitat ==
Heath leschenaultia grows on sand in heath or woodland between Coorow and Albany, and in near-coastal areas between Albany and Israelite Bay in the Avon Wheatbelt, Esperance Plains, Geraldton Sandplains, Jarrah Forest, Mallee, Swan Coastal Plain, and Warren biogeographic regions of south-western Western Australia.

== Conservation status ==
This leschenaultia is listed as "not threatened" by the Government of Western Australia Department of Biodiversity, Conservation and Attractions.
