= Lechenaultia brevifolia =

Scientific classification
- Kingdom: Plantae
- Clade: Tracheophytes
- Clade: Angiosperms
- Clade: Eudicots
- Clade: Asterids
- Order: Asterales
- Family: Goodeniaceae
- Genus: Lechenaultia
- Species: L. brevifolia

Binomial name
- Lechenaultia brevifolia D.A.Morrison

Species of flowering plant

Lechenaultia brevifolia is a species of flowering plant in the family Goodeniaceae and is endemic to inland south-western Western Australia. It is a tufted, sparsely-branched subshrub with crowded, narrow, fleshy leaves and white and blue, tube-shaped flowers.

== Description ==
Lechenaultia brevifolia is a tufted, sparsely-branched subshrub that typically grows to a height of up to 50 cm (20 in) and often forms suckers. The leaves are glabrous, crowded, 2–3 mm (0.079–0.118 in) long, narrow and fleshy. The flowers are arranged in loose clusters, the sepals 3.0–4.5 mm (0.12–0.18 in) long and glabrous. The petals are usually white with dark blue wings and petal lobes, 13–18 mm (0.51–0.71 in) long, the lower petal lobes triangular, 2.5–3.5 mm (0.098–0.138 in) wide and the upper lobes 0.1–1.0 mm (0.0039–0.0394 in) wide. Flowering occurs from July to December and the fruit is 22–29 mm (0.87–1.14 in) long.

== Taxonomy ==
Lechenaultia brevifolia was first formally described in 1987 by David A. Morrison in the journal Brunonia from specimens collected by Richard Helms in 1891. The specific epithet (brevifolia) means "short-leaved".

== Distribution and habitat ==
Lechenaultia brevifolia grows in low heath and scrub between Southern Cross and the Cape Arid National Park in the Avon Wheatbelt, Coolgardie, Great Victoria Desert and Mallee biogeographic regions of inland, south-western Western Australia.
