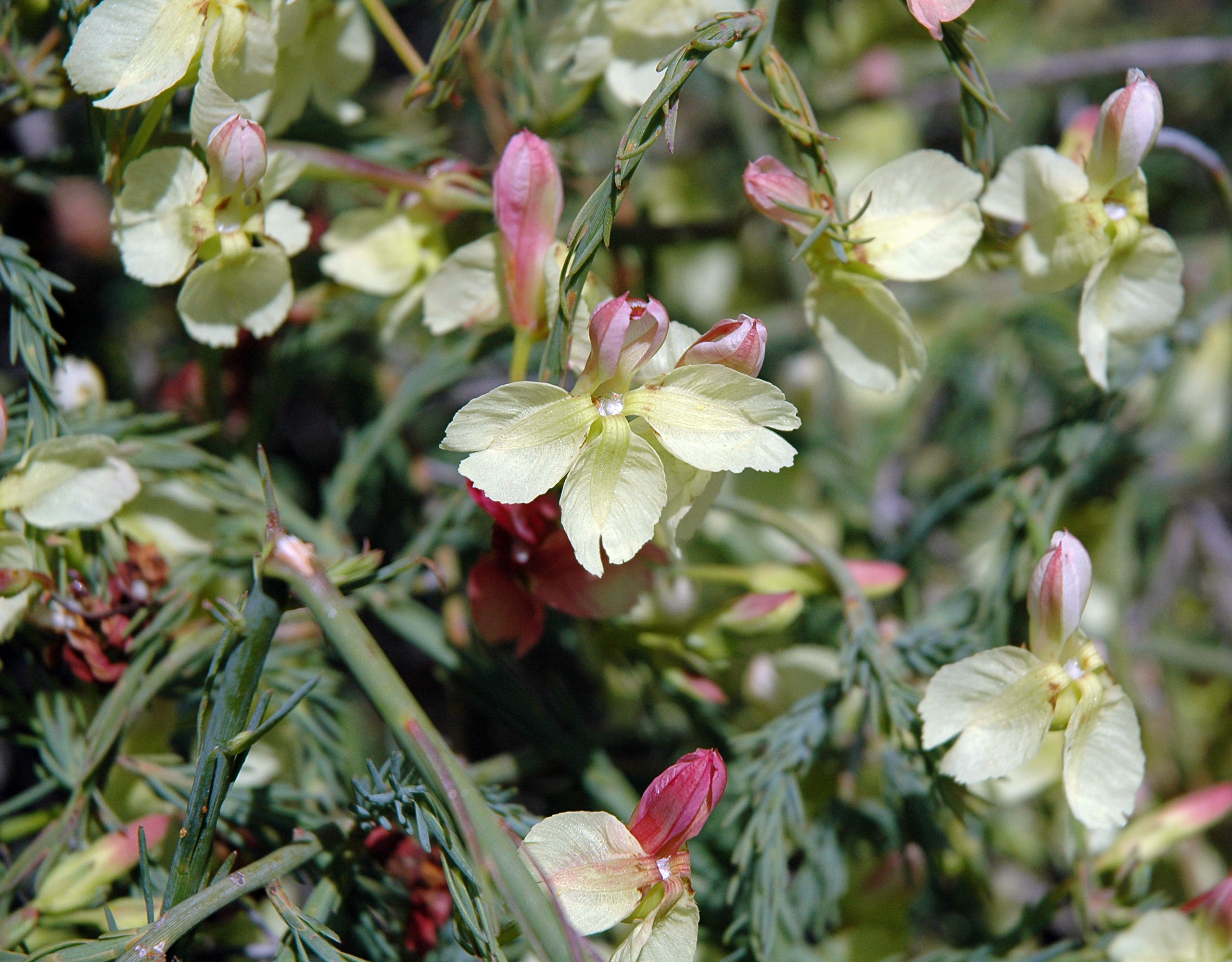
- Lechenaultia linarioides

Scientific classification
- Kingdom: Plantae
- Clade: Tracheophytes
- Clade: Angiosperms
- Clade: Eudicots
- Clade: Asterids
- Order: Asterales
- Family: Goodeniaceae
- Genus: Lechenaultia
- Species: L. linarioides

Binomial name
- Lechenaultia linarioides DC.

Synonyms
- List: Lechenaultia arcuata de Vriese; Lechenaultia grandiflora (Benth.) Druce nom. illeg.; Leschenaultia grandiflora Druce orth. var.; Leschenaultia linarioides DC. orth. var.; Scaevola grandiflora Benth.

= Lechenaultia linarioides =

Yellow leschenaultia

Species of shrub

Lechenaultia linarioides, commonly named yellow leschenaultia, is a species of flowering plant in the family Goodeniaceae and is endemic to near-coastal areas in the west of Western Australia. It is a sprawling subshrub with many tangled branches, narrow, crowded, rather fleshy leaves, and yellow and deep pink to purplish red flowers.

== Description ==
Lechenaultia linarioides is a sprawling subshrub that typically grows to a height of up to 1.5 m (4 ft 11 in) and has many tangled branches. The leaves are crowded along the stems, narrow, rather fleshy and 8.0–12.5 mm (0.31–0.49 in) long. The flowers are arranged singly or in small groups, the sepals usually 5.0–6.5 mm (0.20–0.26 in) long and the petals 16–22 mm (0.63–0.87 in) long and densely hairy inside the petal tube. The petal lobes are more or less the same size, the upper lobes erect, 1.8–2.5 mm (0.071–0.098 in) wide and deep pink to purplish red, the lower lobes yellow. Flowering occurs sporadically throughout the year, and the fruit is 19–33 mm (0.75–1.30 in) long.

== Taxonomy ==
Lechenaultia linarioides was first formally described in 1839 by Augustin Pyramus de Candolle in Prodromus Systematis Naturalis Regni Vegetabilis from specimens collected in the Swan River Colony by James Drummond. The specific epithet (linarioides) means "Linaria-like".

== Distribution and habitat ==
Yellow leschenaultia usually grows in heath or scrub and is found in near-coastal areas of Western Australia from Shark Bay to Perth.

== Conservation status ==
This leschenaultia is listed as "not threatened" by the Government of Western Australia Department of Biodiversity, Conservation and Attractions.
