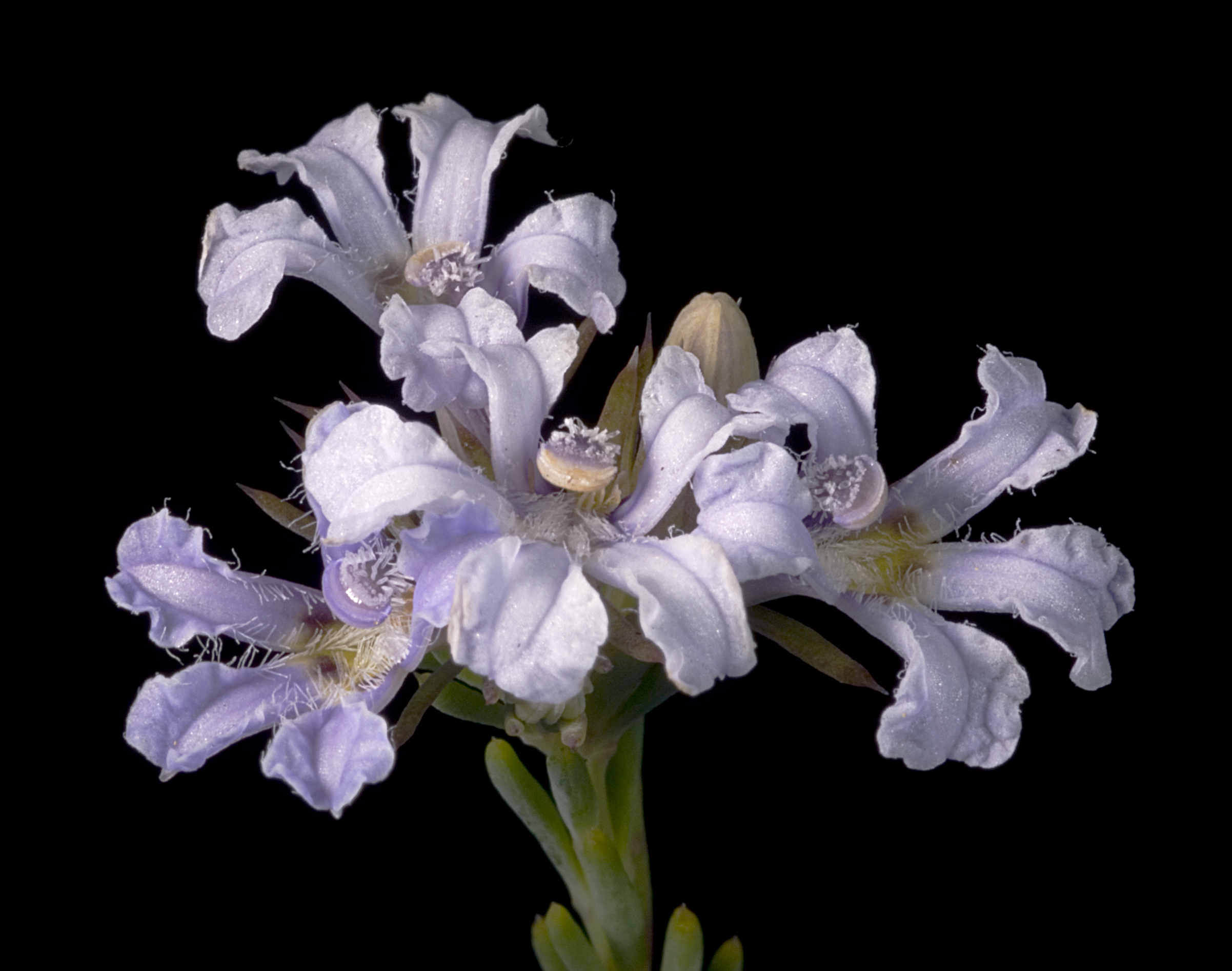

Scientific classification
- Kingdom: Plantae
- Clade: Tracheophytes
- Clade: Angiosperms
- Clade: Eudicots
- Clade: Asterids
- Order: Asterales
- Family: Goodeniaceae
- Genus: Lechenaultia
- Species: L. expansa

Binomial name
- Lechenaultia expansa R.Br.

= Lechenaultia expansa =

Species of flowering plant

Lechenaultia expansa is a species of flowering plant in the family Goodeniaceae and is endemic to the south-west of Western Australia. It is a prostrate to erect subshrub with wand-like branches, crowded, narrow, fleshy leaves and pale purple-blue, tube-shaped flowers.

== Description ==
Lechenaultia expansa is a prostrate or erect subshrub that typically grows to a height of up to 60 cm (24 in) and has wand-like branchlets. The leaves are glabrous, crowded, 5.5–9.5 mm (0.22–0.37 in) long, narrow and fleshy. The flowers are arranged in dense clusters in leaf axils, the sepals 4.5–5.5 mm (0.18–0.22 in) long and glabrous. The petals are 9–11 mm (0.35–0.43 in) long, pale purplish-blue, sparsely hairy and joined at the base to form a pale yellowish-white tube, the petal wings 1.0–1.6 mm (0.039–0.063 in) wide. Flowering occurs from October to January and the fruit is 5–10 mm (0.20–0.39 in) long.

== Taxonomy ==
Lechenaultia expansa was first formally described in 1810 by Robert Brown in his Prodromus Florae Novae Hollandiae et Insulae Van Diemen. The specific epithet (expansa) means "spread out" or "unfolded".

== Distribution and habitat ==
This lechenaultia grows in and near swampy heath and winter-wet areas in near-coastal areas of south-western Western Australia in the Avon Wheatbelt, Jarrah Forest, Mallee, Swan Coastal Plain and Warren biogeographic regions.
