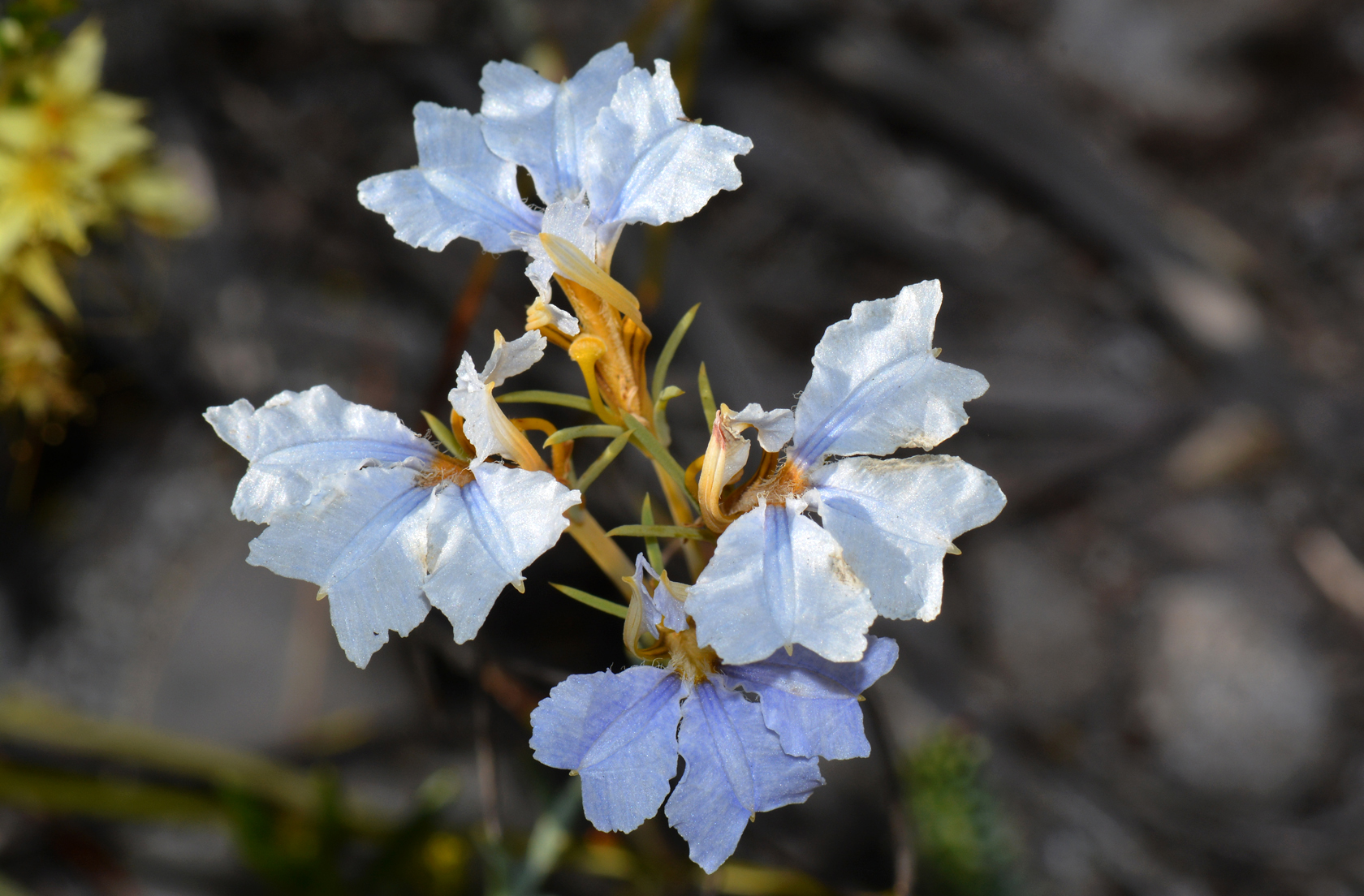
- Lechenaultia hortii in Wandoo National Park

Conservation status
- Priority Two — Poorly Known Taxa (DEC)

Scientific classification
- Kingdom: Plantae
- Clade: Tracheophytes
- Clade: Angiosperms
- Clade: Eudicots
- Clade: Asterids
- Order: Asterales
- Family: Goodeniaceae
- Genus: Lechenaultia
- Species: L. hortii

Binomial name
- Lechenaultia hortii L.W.Sage

= Lechenaultia hortii =

Hort's leschenaultia

Species of flowering plant

Lechenaultia hortii, commonly known as Hort's leschenaultia, is a species of flowering plant in the family Goodeniaceae and is endemic to a restricted part of the south-west of Western Australia. It is an erect to spreading subshrub or herb with fleshy stems, linear leaves, and blue to pale blue and white flowers.

== Description ==
Lechenaultia hortii is an erect to spreading subshrub or herb that typically grows to a height of up to about 40 cm (16 in), and has fleshy, glabrous stems. Its leaves are crowded, especially on the lower stems, linear to narrow egg-shaped, 1.4–10 mm (0.055–0.394 in) long and 0.5–1 mm (0.020–0.039 in) wide. The flowers are arranged in groups near the ends of branchlets, and have linear sepals 5–10 mm (0.20–0.39 in) long. The petals are blue to pale blue and white, 10.5–24 mm (0.41–0.94 in) long and have long, soft hairs inside the petal tube. The petal lobes are more or less equal in length, the upper lobes 4–10 mm (0.16–0.39 in) wide and the lower lobes 4.0–10.5 mm (0.16–0.41 in) long with wings 1–4 mm (0.039–0.157 in) wide. Flowering mainly occurs from November to December.

== Taxonomy ==
Lechenaultia hortii was first formally described in 2006 by Leigh W. Sage in the journal Nuytsia from specimens collected south-west of York in 2003. The specific epithet (hortii) honours Fred Hort, for his efforts in flora conservation in Western Australia.

== Distribution and habitat ==
Hort's leschenaultia grows in open woodland, and is known from only three locations in a national park near York in the Jarrah Forest biogeographic region of south-western Western Australia.

== Conservation status ==
This leschenaultia is listed as "Priority Two" by the Western Australian Government Department of Biodiversity, Conservation and Attractions, meaning that it is poorly known and from only one or a few locations.
