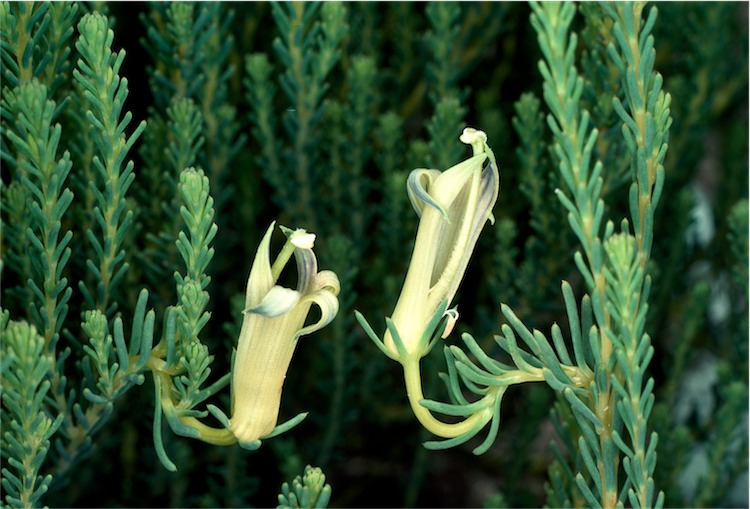
- Lechenaultia acutiloba in the Australian National Botanic Gardens

Conservation status
- Priority Three — Poorly Known Taxa (DEC)

Scientific classification
- Kingdom: Plantae
- Clade: Embryophytes
- Clade: Tracheophytes
- Clade: Spermatophytes
- Clade: Angiosperms
- Clade: Eudicots
- Clade: Asterids
- Order: Asterales
- Family: Goodeniaceae
- Genus: Lechenaultia
- Species: L. acutiloba

Binomial name
- Lechenaultia acutiloba Benth.

= Lechenaultia acutiloba =

Wingless leschenaultia

Species of flowering plant

Lechenaultia acutiloba, commonly known as wingless leschenaultia, is a species of flowering plant in the family Goodeniaceae and is endemic to the south-west of Western Australia. It is a dome-shaped shrub with crowded, linear leaves and many tube-shaped, pale greenish-yellow flowers with blue tips.

== Description ==
Lechenaultia acutiloba is a dome-shaped shrub that typically grows up to 1 m (3 ft 3 in) high and 1.5 m (4 ft 11 in) wide, often with many thin stems. Its leaves are crowded, linear, glabrous 3.0–5.5 mm (0.12–0.22 in) long and greyish green. There are many sessile flowers arranged singly on the ends of branchlets with glabrous, lance-shaped sepals 3–5 mm (0.12–0.20 in) long. The petals form an erect, greenish-yellow tube with blue tips 21–25 mm (0.83–0.98 in) long, the tube white and hairy inside. Flowering occurs from mid-September to late December.

== Taxonomy ==
Lechenaultia acutiloba was first formally described in 1868 by George Bentham in Flora Australiensis from specimens collected near the Young River by George Maxwell. The specific epithet (acutiloba) means "sharp-pointed lobes", referring to the petals.

== Distribution and habitat ==
Wingless leschenaultia usually grows near river banks, sometimes in swamps and is found between Ongerup and Ravensthorpe in the Esperance Plains and Mallee biogeographic regions of south-western Western Australia.

== Conservation status ==
Lechenaultia acutiloba is listed as "Priority Three" by the Government of Western Australia Department of Biodiversity, Conservation and Attractions, meaning that it is poorly known and known from only a few locations but is not under imminent threat.
