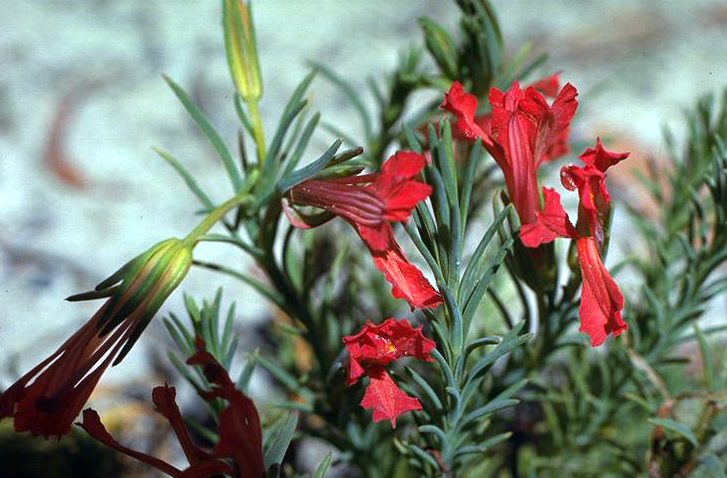
- Lechenaultia longiloba in the ANBG

Conservation status
- Priority Four — Rare Taxa (DEC)

Scientific classification
- Kingdom: Plantae
- Clade: Tracheophytes
- Clade: Angiosperms
- Clade: Eudicots
- Clade: Asterids
- Order: Asterales
- Family: Goodeniaceae
- Genus: Lechenaultia
- Species: L. longiloba

Binomial name
- Lechenaultia longiloba F.Muell.

= Lechenaultia longiloba =

Irwin leschenaultia

Species of shrub

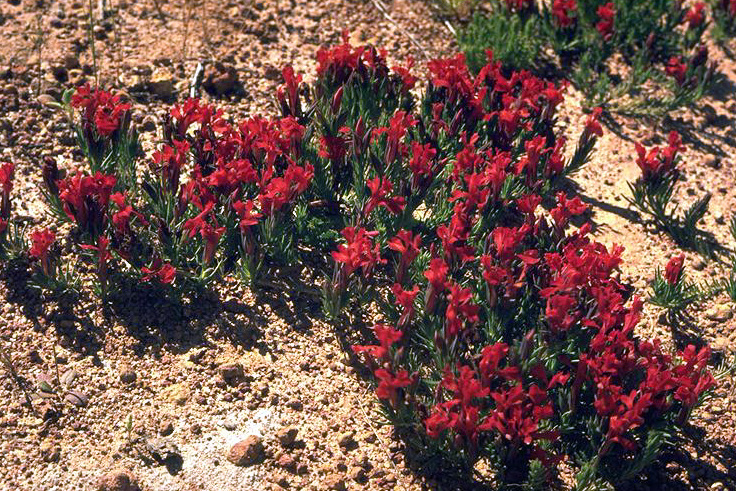
Habit near Coalseam

Lechenaultia longiloba, commonly named Irwin leschenaultia, is a species of flowering plant in the family Goodeniaceae and is endemic to the south-west of Western Australia. It is a straggling, low-lying herb or subshrub with narrow, rather fleshy leaves, and pale yellow or green petals with deep pink or red wings.

== Description ==
Lechenaultia longiloba is a straggling, mostly glabrous, low-lying herb or subshrub that typically grows to a height of up to 30 cm (12 in), has few branches and often forms suckers. The leaves are narrow, rather fleshy and 9.5–26 mm (0.37–1.02 in) long. The flowers are arranged in compact groups, the sepals 16.5–21 mm (0.65–0.83 in) long and the petals 25–35 mm (0.98–1.38 in) long and densely hairy inside the petal tube. The petals are pale yellow or green with deep pink or red wings 1.7–4.2 mm (0.067–0.165 in) wide. The petal lobes are more or less the same size, the upper lobes erect and the lower lobes spreading. Flowering occurs from July to October, and the fruit is 20–26 mm (0.79–1.02 in) long.

== Taxonomy ==
Lechenaultia longiloba was first formally described in 1867 by Ferdinand von Mueller in Fragmenta Phytographiae Australiae from specimens collected by James Drummond. The specific epithet (longiloba) means "long-lobed", referring to the sepals.

== Distribution and habitat ==
Irwin leschenaultia grows in sandy soil in heath and is found from Dongara to Mullewa in the Geraldton Sandplains biogeographic region of south-western Western Australia.

== Conservation status ==
This leschenaultia is listed as "Priority Four" by the Government of Western Australia Department of Biodiversity, Conservation and Attractions, meaning that it is rare or near threatened.
