= Lechenaultia papillata =

Scientific classification
- Kingdom: Plantae
- Clade: Tracheophytes
- Clade: Angiosperms
- Clade: Eudicots
- Clade: Asterids
- Order: Asterales
- Family: Goodeniaceae
- Genus: Lechenaultia
- Species: L. papillata

Binomial name
- Lechenaultia papillata D.A.Morrison

Species of shrub

Lechenaultia papillata is a species of flowering plant in the family Goodeniaceae and is endemic to inland areas of south-western Western Australia. It is a diffuse, ascending shrub or subshrub with papillate, crowded, slightly fleshy leaves, and pale blue flowers.

== Description ==
Lechenaultia papillata is a diffuse, ascending shrub or subshrub that typically grows to a height of up to 45 cm (18 in) and has glabrous, papillate leaves, sepals, ovaries and fruit. The leaves are crowded, narrow, slightly fleshy and 1.5–3 mm (0.059–0.118 in) long. The flowers are arranged in compact groups, the sepals 3–5 mm (0.12–0.20 in) long and the petals pale blue and 11–14 mm (0.43–0.55 in) long with long hairs inside the petal tube. The wings on the upper lobes are 0.8–1.6 mm (0.031–0.063 in) wide, on the lower lobes triangular and 1.9–2.6 mm (0.075–0.102 in) wide. Flowering occurs in October and November, and the fruit is 10–16 mm (0.39–0.63 in) long.

== Taxonomy ==
Lechenaultia papillata was first formally described in 1987 by David A. Morrison in the journal Brunonia from specimens collected north of the mouth of the Oldfield River by Hansjörg Eichler in 1968. The specific epithet (papillata) means "papillate".

== Distribution and habitat ==
This leschenaultia grows in heath, scrub or mallee in the Coolgardie, Esperance Plains and Mallee biogeographic regions of inland south-western Western Australia.

== Conservation status ==
This leschenaultia is listed as "not threatened" by the Government of Western Australia Department of Biodiversity, Conservation and Attractions.
