= Lechenaultia chlorantha =

Kalbarri leschenaultia

Conservation status
- Vulnerable (EPBC Act)

Scientific classification
- Kingdom: Plantae
- Clade: Tracheophytes
- Clade: Angiosperms
- Clade: Eudicots
- Clade: Asterids
- Order: Asterales
- Family: Goodeniaceae
- Genus: Lechenaultia
- Species: L. chlorantha

Binomial name
- Lechenaultia chlorantha F.Muell.

Synonyms
- Lechenaultia formosa var. chlorantha (F.Muell.) K.Krause; Leschenaultia formosa var. chlorantha (F.Muell.) K.Krause orth. var.

Species of flowering plant

Lechenaultia chlorantha, commonly known as Kalbarri leschenaultia, is a species of flowering plant in the family Goodeniaceae and is endemic to a restricted area near Kalbarri in Western Australia. It is a subshrub or shrub with many branches, crowded, narrow, fleshy leaves and pale bluish-green, tube-shaped flowers.

== Description ==
Lechenaultia chlorantha is an openly-branched subshrub or shrub that typically grows to a height of up to 30 cm (12 in), has many branches and often forms suckers. The leaves are glabrous, crowded, 6.5–13.5 mm (0.26–0.53 in) long, narrow and fleshy. The flowers are arranged singly on the ends of branchlets, the sepals 7.5–9.0 mm (0.30–0.35 in) long and glabrous. The petals are pale bluish-green, 21–25 mm (0.83–0.98 in) long, the wings on the lower petal lobes triangular, 4.5–6.0 mm (0.18–0.24 in) wide, on the upper lobes 0.1–1.5 mm (0.0039–0.0591 in) wide. Flowering occurs from August to September and the fruit is 18–23 mm (0.71–0.91 in) long.

== Taxonomy ==
Lechenaultia chlorantha was first formally described in 1860 by Ferdinand von Mueller in Fragmenta Phytographiae Australiae from specimens collected near the Murchison River. The specific epithet (chlorantha) means "green-flowered".

== Distribution and habitat ==
Kalbarri leschenaultia grows in rocky sandstone near the mouth of the Murchison River at Kalbarri in the Geraldton Sandplains biogeographic region of south-western Western Australia.

== Conservation status ==
This lechenaultia is listed as "vulnerable" under the Australian Government Environment Protection and Biodiversity Conservation Act 1999 and as "Threatened Flora (Declared Rare Flora — Extant)" by the Department of Biodiversity, Conservation and Attractions
