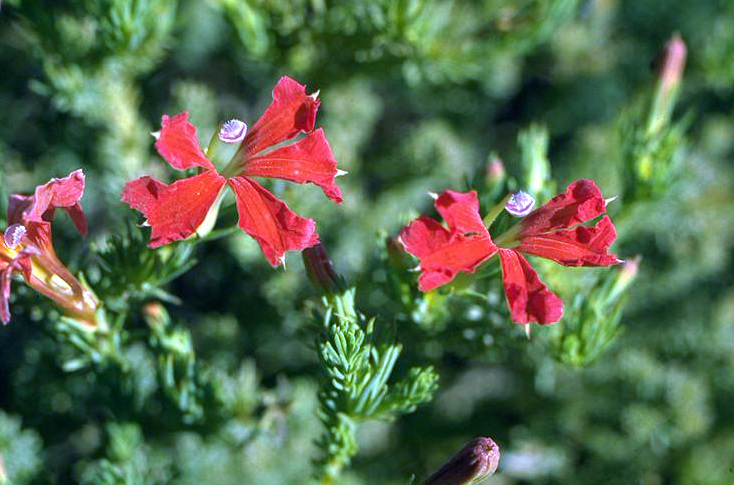
- Lechenaultia laricina

Conservation status
- Declared rare (DEC)

Scientific classification
- Kingdom: Plantae
- Clade: Tracheophytes
- Clade: Angiosperms
- Clade: Eudicots
- Clade: Asterids
- Order: Asterales
- Family: Goodeniaceae
- Genus: Lechenaultia
- Species: L. laricina

Binomial name
- Lechenaultia laricina Lindl.

Synonyms
- List: Lechenaultia splendens Hook.; Lechenaultia splendens Hook. var. splendens; Lechenaultia splendens var. stricta Hook.; Leschenaultia laricina Lindl. orth. var.; Leschenaultia splendens Hook. orth. var.; Leschenaultia splendens var. stricta Hook. orth. var.

= Lechenaultia laricina =

Scarlet leschenaultia

Species of flowering plant

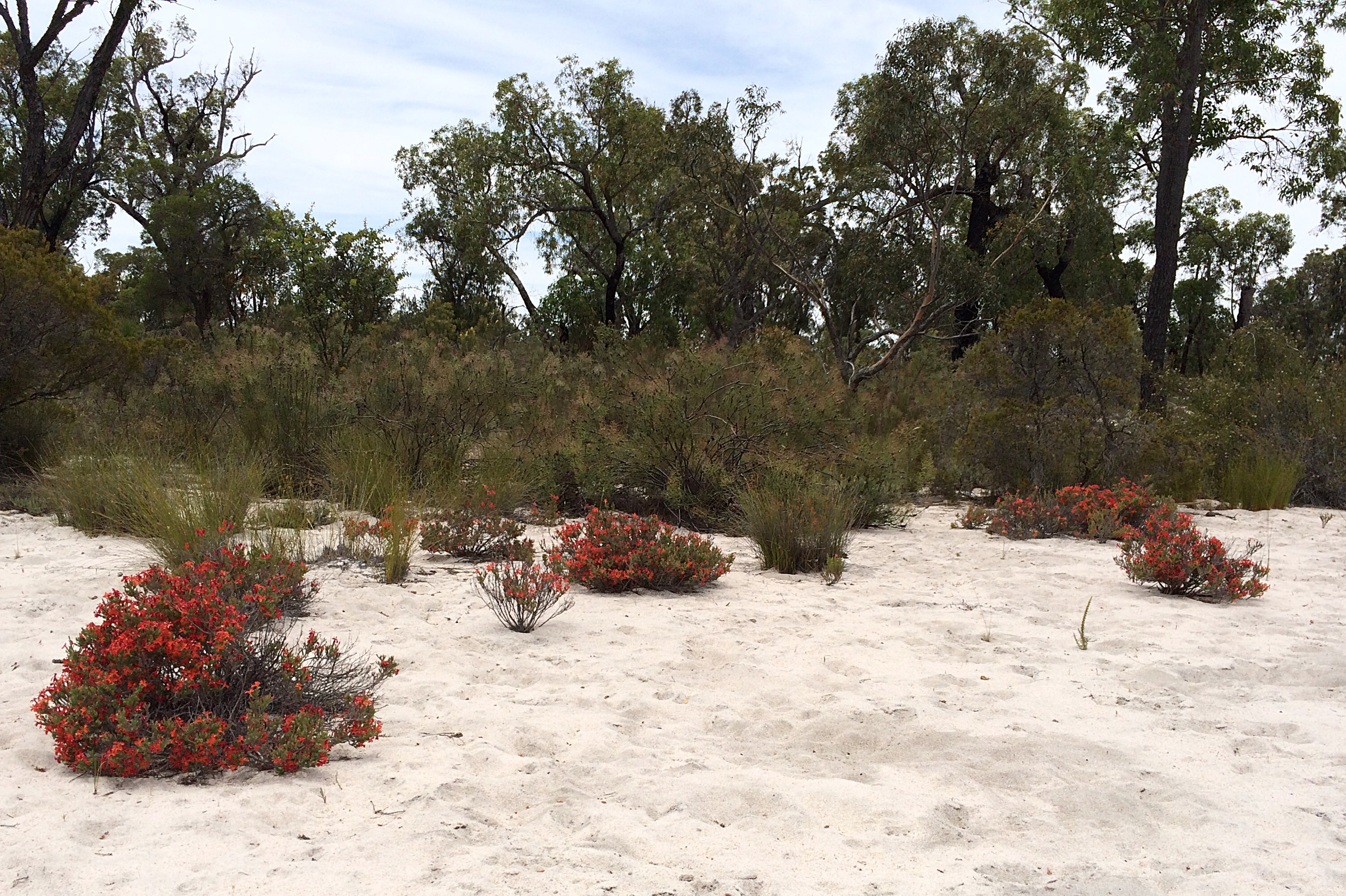
Habit

Lechenaultia juncea, commonly known as scarlet leschenaultia, is a species of flowering plant in the family Goodeniaceae and is endemic to the south-west of Western Australia. It is an open, ascending shrub with narrow, crowded, rather fleshy leaves, and scarlet to orange-red flowers.

== Description ==
Lechenaultia juncea is an open, ascending shrub that typically grows to a height of up to about 70 cm (28 in), with many branches and that often suckers. Its leaves are crowded, narrow, rather fleshy, 5.5–11.5 mm (0.22–0.45 in) long. The flowers are arranged in compact groups, the sepals 5.0–7.5 mm (0.20–0.30 in) long, the petals scarlet to orange-red, 19–23 mm (0.75–0.91 in) long and densely hairy inside the petal tube. The wings on the lower lobes are triangular, 1.5–2.5 mm (0.059–0.098 in) wide and the upper petal lobes are erect. Flowering mainly occurs from September to December and the fruit is 17–29 mm (0.67–1.14 in) long.

== Taxonomy ==
Lechenaultia laricina was first formally described in 1839 by John Lindley in A Sketch of the Vegetation of the Swan River Colony. The specific epithet (laricina) means "larch-tree like".

== Distribution and habitat ==
Scarlet leschenaultia usually grows in sandy soils in woodland between Meckering, Clackline and Kukerin in the Avon Wheatbelt, Jarrah Forest and Mallee biogeographic regions of south-western Western Australia.

== Conservation status ==
This leschenaultia is listed as "Threatened Flora (Declared Rare Flora — Extant)" by the Department of Biodiversity, Conservation and Attractions.
