= Lechenaultia juncea =

Reed-like leschenaultia

Conservation status
- Priority Three — Poorly Known Taxa (DEC)

Scientific classification
- Kingdom: Plantae
- Clade: Embryophytes
- Clade: Tracheophytes
- Clade: Spermatophytes
- Clade: Angiosperms
- Clade: Eudicots
- Clade: Asterids
- Order: Asterales
- Family: Goodeniaceae
- Genus: Lechenaultia
- Species: L. juncea

Binomial name
- Lechenaultia juncea E.Pritz.

Species of flowering plant

Lechenaultia juncea, commonly known as reed-like leschenaultia, is a species of flowering plant in the family Goodeniaceae and is endemic to the south-west of Western Australia. It is an erect, perennial herb or shrub with crowded, fleshy leaves, and pale blue flowers.

== Description ==
Lechenaultia juncea is an erect, perennial herb or shrub that typically grows to a height of up to about 50 cm (20 in), and is sparsely branched. Its leaves are fleshy, crowded on the lower stems, sparsely arranged on the flowering stems, 8.5–16 mm (0.33–0.63 in) long. The flowers are arranged in loose groups, the sepals 5–6 mm (0.20–0.24 in) long, the petals pale blue, 14–18 mm (0.55–0.71 in) long with long, soft hairs inside the petal tube. The wings on the lower lobes are 2.5–3.5 mm (0.098–0.138 in) wide and those on the upper petal lobes, if present, are 0.3–0.9 mm (0.012–0.035 in) wide. Flowering occurs from November to December.

== Taxonomy ==
Lechenaultia juncea was first formally described in 1905 by Ernst Georg Pritzel in Botanische Jahrbücher für Systematik, Pflanzengeschichte und Pflanzengeographie from specimens collected near Watheroo. The specific epithet (juncea) means "rush-like".

== Distribution and habitat ==
Reed-like leschenaultia grows in heath in gravel or sandy soils between Three Springs and Gunyidi in the Avon Wheatbelt and Geraldton Sandplains biogeographic regions of south-western Western Australia.

== Conservation status ==
This leschenaultia is listed as "Priority Three" by the Government of Western Australia Department of Biodiversity, Conservation and Attractions, meaning that it is poorly known and known from only a few locations but is not under imminent threat.
