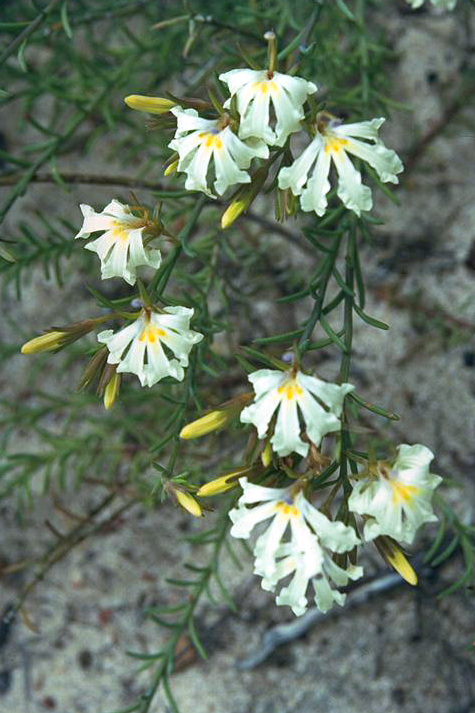
- Lechenaultia stenosepala near Jurien Bay

Scientific classification
- Kingdom: Plantae
- Clade: Tracheophytes
- Clade: Angiosperms
- Clade: Eudicots
- Clade: Asterids
- Order: Asterales
- Family: Goodeniaceae
- Genus: Lechenaultia
- Species: L. stenosepala

Binomial name
- Lechenaultia stenosepala E.Pritz.

= Lechenaultia stenosepala =

Narrow-sepaled leschenaultia

Species of shrub

Lechenaultia stenosepala, commonly known as narrow-sepaled leschenaultia, is a species of flowering plant in the family Goodeniaceae and is endemic to the south-west of Western Australia. It is an open, more or less erect perennial herb or shrub with crowded, narrow leaves, and blue to pale blue or creamy-white flowers.

== Description ==
Lechenaultia stenosepala is an open, more or less erect perennial herb or shrub that typically grows to a height of 50 cm (20 in) and often forms suckers. The leaves are crowded on short stems, scattered on flowering stems and are 7.5–13 mm (0.30–0.51 in) long but narrow. The flowers are arranged in compact groups and are blue to pale blue or creamy-white. The sepals are 7.5–11 mm (0.30–0.43 in) long and the petals 13–19 mm (0.51–0.75 in) long with soft hairs inside the petal tube. The wings on the lobes are more or less equal and 0.9–2 mm (0.035–0.079 in) wide. Flowering occurs from October to December, and the fruit is 5–7 mm (0.20–0.28 in) long.

== Taxonomy ==
Lechenaultia stenosepala was first formally described in 1964 by Ernst Georg Pritzel in the Botanische Jahrbücher für Systematik, Pflanzengeschichte und Pflanzengeographie from specimens collected near Dandaragan. The specific epithet (stenosepala) means "narrow-sepalled".

== Distribution and habitat ==
Narrow-sepaled leschenaultia grows in low, open heath between Three Springs and Gingin in the Avon Wheatbelt, Geraldton Sandplains, Jarrah Forest and Swan Coastal Plain biogeographic regions of south-western Western Australia.

== Conservation status ==
This leschenaultia is listed as "not threatened" by the Government of Western Australia Department of Biodiversity, Conservation and Attractions.
