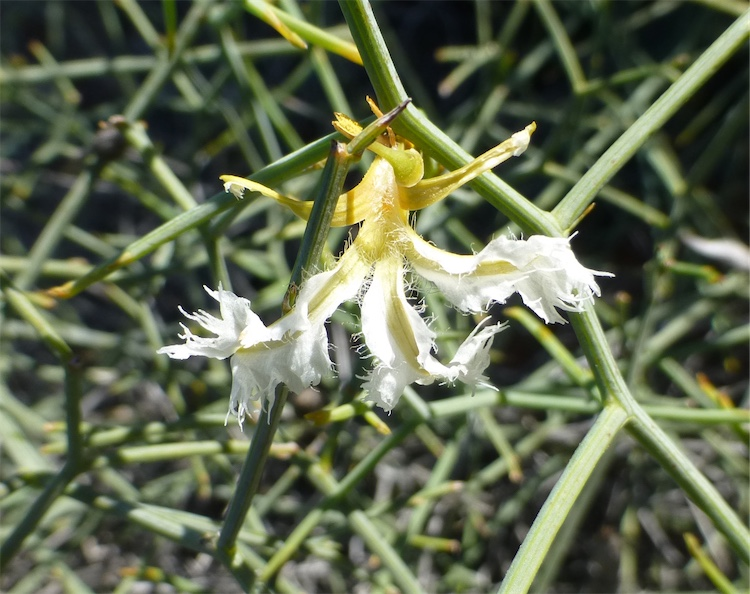
- In the Poeppel Corner region of Queensland

Scientific classification
- Kingdom: Plantae
- Clade: Tracheophytes
- Clade: Angiosperms
- Clade: Eudicots
- Clade: Asterids
- Order: Asterales
- Family: Goodeniaceae
- Genus: Lechenaultia
- Species: L. divaricata

Binomial name
- Lechenaultia divaricata F.Muell.

= Lechenaultia divaricata =

Tangled leschenaultia

Species of flowering plant

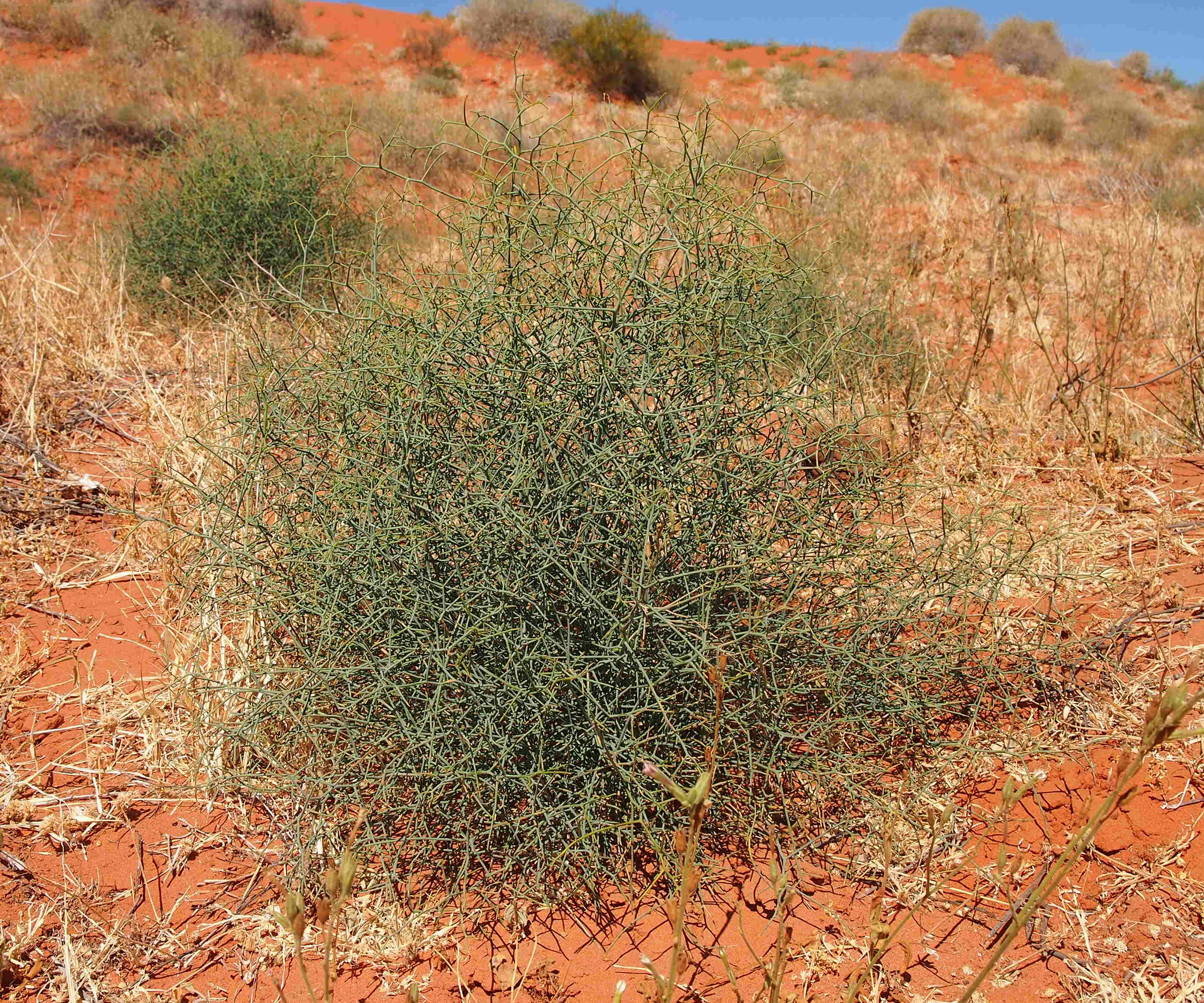
Habit

Lechenaultia divaricata, commonly known as tangled leschenaultia, wirenetting bush or wirebush, is a species of flowering plant in the family Goodeniaceae and is endemic to arid and semi-arid areas of central Australia.

== Description ==
Lechenaultia divaricata is an erect subshrub that typically grows to a height of up to 100 cm (39 in) and has many spreading branches and glabrous foliage. The leaves are reduced to scattered, membrane-like, triangular scales 1–3 mm (0.039–0.118 in) long. The flowers are arranged singly on the ends of branchlets, the sepals 1.5–2.0 mm (0.059–0.079 in) long. The petals are creamy-white to yellow, 13–20 mm (0.51–0.79 in) long, the wings on the lower petal lobes triangular, 1.5–2.5 mm (0.059–0.098 in) wide and fringed, on the upper lobes up to 0.4 mm (0.016 in) wide. Flowering occurs sporadically throughout the year and the fruit is a cylindrical capsule 9–32 mm (0.35–1.26 in) long.

== Taxonomy ==
Lechenaultia divaricata was first formally described in 1862 by Ferdinand von Mueller in Fragmenta Phytographiae Australiae from specimens collected near Coopers Creek. The specific epithet (divaricata) means "widely-spreading".

== Distribution and habitat ==
Tangled leschenaultia grows in sand, often on sand dunes in mulga scrub and woodland in arid and semi-arid areas of inland South Australia, the Northern Territory, Queensland and New South Wales.
