= Wooroloo Regional Park =

Conservation area in Western Australia

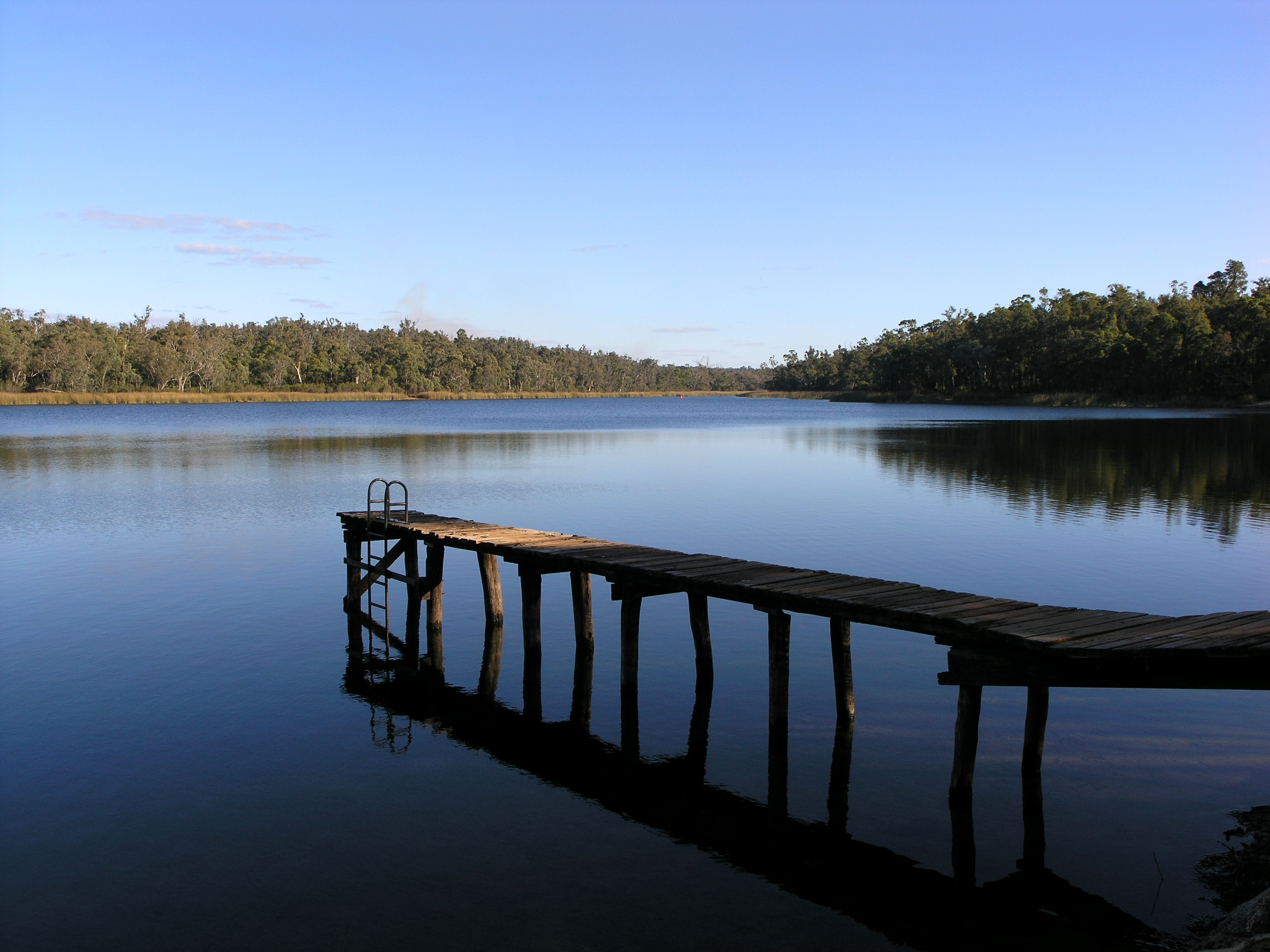
- Lake Leschenaultia in 2006
- Interactive map of Wooroloo Regional Park
- Type: Regional park
- Location: Shire of Mundaring
- Coordinates: 31°50′06″S 116°17′00″E
- Administrator: Department of Biodiversity, Conservation and Attractions
- Website: parks.dpaw.wa.gov.au/park/wooroloo

Wooroloo Regional Park, formerly Chidlow Regional Park, is a conservation park near Chidlow in the Perth Hills, 40 kilometres north-east of Perth, Western Australia, located within the Shire of Mundaring.

== Overview ==
Wooroloo, historically also spelled Worrilow and Warriloo, is an Aboriginal word of the Nyungar language, first recorded in 1841. A Noongar elder who was consulted during the renaming process translated Wooroloo as "come back again" or "you will return".

The regional park was renamed in 2008, alongside two other regional parks and three national parks in the area. Prior to 2008 Wooroloo, along with three other regional parks had, been part of the larger Darling Range Regional Park which had been formed in the 1990s.

Wooroloo is one of eleven regional parks in the Perth region of Western Australia. The purpose of these regional parks is to serve as urban havens to preserve and restore cultural heritage and valuable ecosystems as well as to encourage sustainable nature-based recreation activities.

== Area ==
Wooroloo Regional Park consists of the following reserves:

| Image | Name | Location | Description | Co-ordinates |
|---|---|---|---|---|
| | Beechina Nature Reserve | Beechina | | 31.856247°S 116.317172°E |
| | Beechina North Nature Reserve | Beechina | | 31.844947°S 116.313396°E |
| | Brookside Park | Parkerville | | 31.879427°S 116.135129°E |
| | Falls Park | | | |
| | Keaginine Nature Reserve | Copley | | 31.812722°S 116.362145°E |
| | Lake Leschenaultia | Chidlow | | 31.854167°S 116.250556°E |
| | Leschenaultia Conservation Park | Chidlow | | 31.867383°S 116.233732°E |
| | Milligan Park | Stoneville | | 31.881331°S 116.168919°E |
| | Yennerdin Park | Parkerville | | 31.881406°S 116.137523°E |
