= Mundaring Hotel =

The Mundaring Hotel
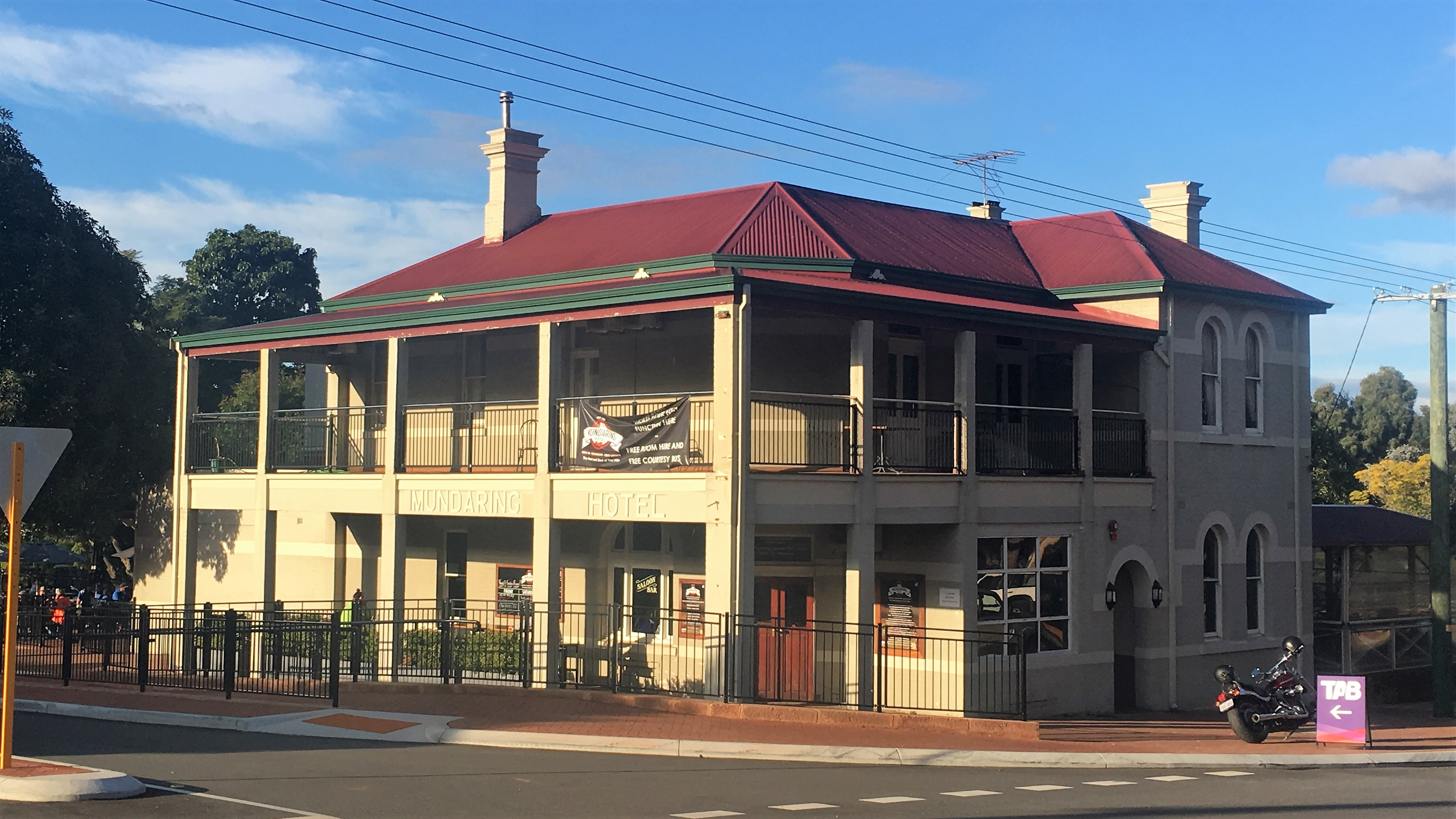
- Interactive map of the The Mundaring Hotel area

General information
- Status: Trading
- Type: Hotel
- Location: Corner Nichol Street & Jacoby Street, Mundaring, Australia
- Coordinates: 31.9036°S 116.1658°E
- Opened: 1899

Website
- http://mundaringhotel.com.au/

The Mundaring Hotel was opened in 1899 in Mundaring, a hills suburb of Perth, Western Australia.

== History ==
On 22 October 1898, soon after the Mundaring townsite was gazetted in May 1898, Henry Augustus Hummerston, known as Harry, then licensee of the Helena Vale Hotel in Midland, acquired land on the corner of Nichol Street and Jacoby Street close to the newly built Mundaring railway station. In April 1899, the first publican, Michael Hummerston (Henry's father), opened the hotel for business; he only held the licence for less than a year. Then it was taken over by Albert Muddock, and it quickly became a very fashionable weekend retreat.

By June 1900, his lease had been taken over by John Chipper. Chipper successfully sued member of parliament Mathieson Jacoby MLA for "buying votes with beer" after one of his staff refused to pay his bar debt.

After the original owner, Henry Augustus Hummerston, died in 1932, Fred Jacoby bought the place. Later licensees of the hotel were Bob Crawford, Charles Howe, H.C. Scott, A.A. Gregory, Thomas Clipson, C. Comyns, T. Carrington, and William Gill.

The Mundaring Hotel was a two-storey, brick building and became a landmark in the town. It was strategically situated and as a result was the social centre for the district. The hotel held everything from sporting club lunches, to wine and fruit growers contests, and hosted the local masonic lodge and progress committee.

Mundaring was considered a healthy retreat from Perth and the goldfields, with "nature to be seen in its primitive state all around", and the Mundaring Hotel was a popular place to stay during the holidays.

Mundaring was seen as a major attraction for Perth. In 1914, whilst on a tour to inspect the Australian Army, Sir Ian Hamilton, Premier John Scaddan, Minister for Lands Thomas Bath, Chief of the General Staff Brigadier-General Joseph Gordon and Commandant of the 5th Military District Colonel Godfrey Irving visited Mundaring and lunched at the Mundaring Hotel.

At times the licensees names were part of the common name of the hotel, like in 1917, when it was known as "Richardsons".

== Architectural character ==
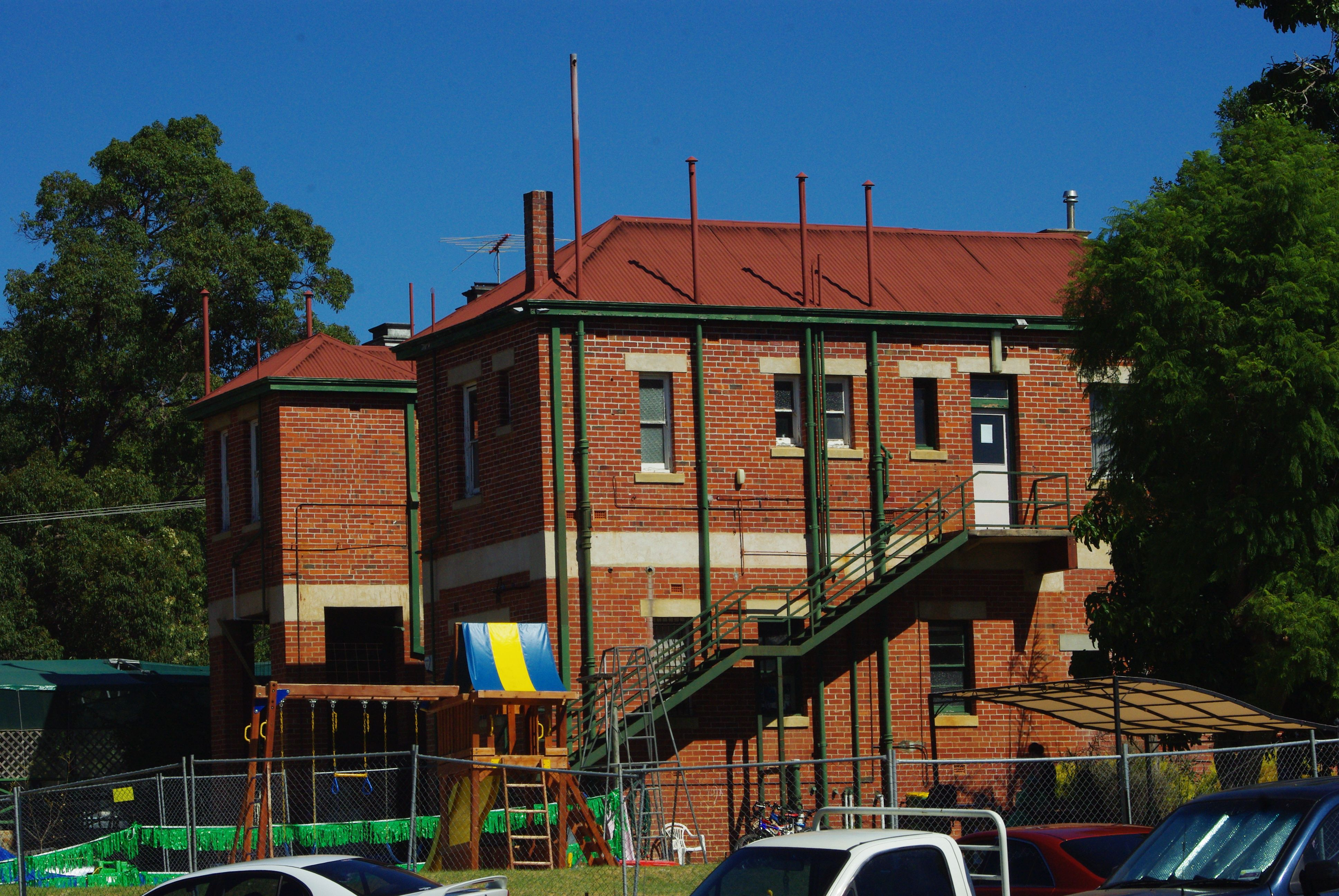
Before the paint - the north side brickwork in 2009

The hotel is a two storey Federation Free Style building and has landmark qualities. The first floor verandahs and balustrades still overhang the footpath and have not been removed as has been the fate of most of the hotels throughout the state. The verandahs wrap around the street frontage from Nichol Street to Jacoby Street, terminating at a projecting "residents" entry featuring narrow, arched windows and door. The corrugated iron roof is painted red and has a simple hipped form punctuated by two, relatively tall brick chimneys with decorative rendered mouldings.

== Heritage value ==
The Mundaring Hotel is positioned prominently in the old heart of Mundaring, opposite the Railway Reserves Heritage Trail and on the adjacent corner of the Mundaring Hall.

The Mundaring Hotel has very high visual, social and historic significance and is a local landmark with its associations with the old heart of Mundaring and prominent people involved with the development of the district.

In 1997 the Mundaring Hotel was categorised as having exceptional significance on the Shire of Mundaring municipal inventory and in 2016 was listed on Western Australia’s Heritage Register for the contribution made by the place to Western Australia’s cultural heritage.

== See also ==
- Mount Helena Tavern
- Mundaring Weir
- Parkerville Tavern
