= Mundaring and Hills Historical Society =

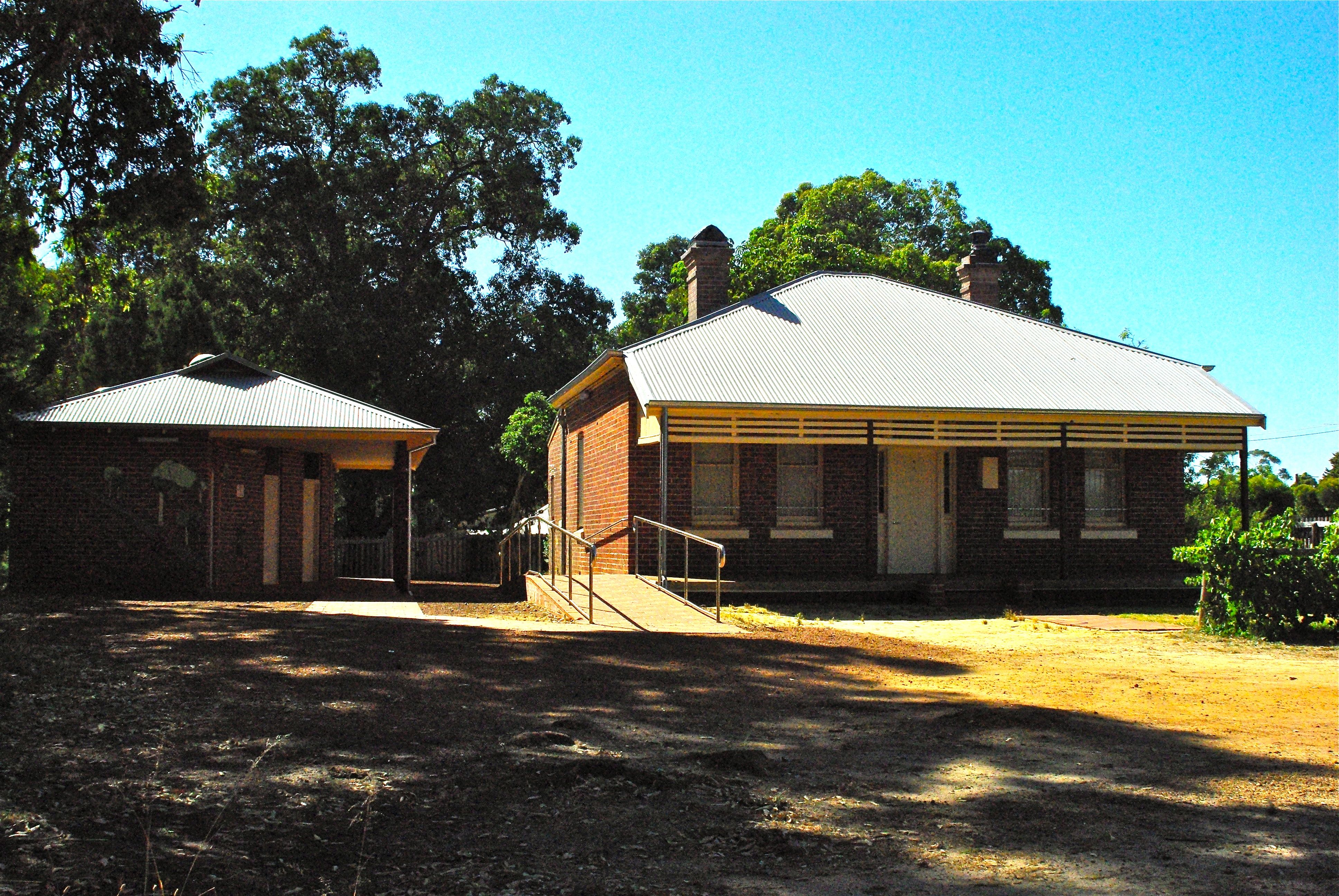
Mundaring station master's house, adjacent to the former Mundaring railway station, the current location of the society

The Mundaring and Hills Historical Society (MHHS) is a local history society for the Shire of Mundaring, based in Mundaring, Western Australia.

Affiliated with the Royal Western Australian Historical Society, the Society is a vital conduit for the disparate heritage and history issues in the Shire area. In earlier times a group of scattered communities linked by the railway branches that now constitutes the Railway Reserve Heritage Trail.

== Overview ==
The Mundaring and Hills Historical Society was formed in 1989. Prior to this historical and heritage issues in the Hills region saw significant losses of information, and loss of details of people and properties. The Society has corrected this, being able to attract significant funding and patronage to maintain a museum and to collect a wide range of materials and information. It is also one of the organisations heavily involved in the annual Trek the Trail that utilises sections of the Railway Reserve Heritage Trail as an outdoor event.

The Mundaring and Hills Historical Society was a finalist in the 2011 Western Australian Heritage Awards.

== Projects ==
Projects that the Mundaring and Hills Historical Society have been involved in include:

- Childow Proclamation Train Sculpture 2004 – to mark the 175th anniversary of Western Australia and Proclamation Day 2004. Chidlow was the last stopping point, prior to entering Perth, for the WA Governor's train carrying WA's first constitution in 1890. The MHHS was successful in obtaining a grant for the purpose of marking this event.
- Parkerville Roll of Honour Restoration 2004 – Restoration was made possible via a grant from the ANZAC Day Working Group's Small Grant Scheme and with a significant contribution by the local Ratepayers and Residents Group. Mundaring and Hills Historical Society researched the Roll and were able to provide new insights into the men honoured on the roll.

== Publications ==
- Mundaring and Hills Historical Society (2000), Patchwork of memories : the story of women in Mundaring whose lives made a difference, Bruce Publishing, ISBN 978-1-875372-21-8
- Duckham, Ian; Mundaring and Hills Historical Society (issuing body.); Duckham, Ian (2011), All fired up : a history of the volunteer bush fire brigades in the Shire of Mundaring 1903-2010, [Mundaring, Western Australia] Mundaring and Hills Historical Society, ISBN 978-0-9870954-0-4
- Bertola, Shelley; Mundaring & Hills Historical Society (1997), Mundaring centenary, 1898-1998, Mundaring & Hills Historical Society (published 1998), ISBN 978-0-646-31122-7
- Mundaring Arts Centre; Mundaring and Hills Historical Society (2002), Memory rewind play, Mundaring and Hills Historical Society in conjunction with the Mundaring Arts Centre

== Mundaring District Museum ==
The Society has its operational headquarters in a heritage property – the brick and iron Mundaring Station Master's House. The Society also operates a museum in the former Mundaring School building, known as the Mundaring District Museum.
