= 2014 Perth Hills bushfire =

Bushfire in Perth, Western Australia in 2014

2014 Perth Hills bushfire (Parkerville fire)
- Date: 12 January – 1 February
- Coordinates: 31°52′46″S 116°9′00″E (approximate ignition point on corner of Granite Rd. and Johnson Road, Parkerville)

Statistics
- Burned area: At least 386 hectares (1,000 acres)
- Land use: Residential; Pasture; Uncleared private property

Impacts
- Structures destroyed: 57 houses (6 damaged); Several non-residential buildings
- Cost: At least A$13 million

Ignition
- Cause: Accidental (power pole falls, igniting vegetation)

Map
- Location of the approximate ignition point, relative to the Perth central business district in Western Australia

The 2014 Perth Hills bushfire, sometimes referred to as the Parkerville fire, was a bushfire that burned from 12 January to 1 February and affected the Mundaring municipality of the Perth Hills in the Australian state of Western Australia. During a major run of the fire on the afternoon and evening of 12 January, fifty-seven houses and numerous non-residential buildings were completely destroyed, and a further six houses were damaged in the suburbs of Mount Helena, Stoneville, and Parkerville. Approximately 386 hectares (1,000 acres) of uncleared land and pasture—the majority on private property—were burned during the 21-day duration of the fire. None of the residential subdivisions impacted had been formally declared as being within a bushfire prone area.

The cause of the fire was recorded as accidental by the Department of Fire and Emergency Services (DFES). The source of ignition was determined by both the DFES and Energy Safety to have been a fallen power pole, which ignited extremely dry vegetation at approximately 11:00 AWST (UTC+8) during a period of easterly winds gusting up to moderate gale force and temperatures in excess of 40 °C (104 °F). A considerable quantity of property in Stoneville was destroyed following a wind change that brought fresh breezes from the south west to the fire ground, just prior to 15:00 AWST.

== Background ==
In the Mt. Helena, Parkerville, and Stoneville suburbs of Mundaring Shire there are a mixture of large properties with stands of open woodland and pastures, and standard residential blocks with trees in a close vicinity to houses. The majority of the area eventually burned was within a broad valley sloping gently upward, west to east. The fuels were typical of a Eucalypt open forest; an over-story composed primarily of jarrah (eucalyptus marginata) and marri (corymbia calophylla), with scrub, leaf litter and patches of grass constituting the fuel load in the under-story. The estimated average fuel load was 15 tonne per hectare (t/ha), with a maximum fuel load of 20 t/ha in some areas of the fire ground.

== Aftermath ==
https://www.perthnow.com.au/news/bushfires/parkerville-pole-owner-never-warned-about-fire-risk-ng-b88914030z

== See also ==
- Bushfires in Australia
- List of Australian bushfire seasons
