= Echo Newspapers =

Newspaper company in Perth, Western Australia

The Echo is a weekly newspaper founded in 1985 and delivered every Saturday in the eastern suburbs of Perth, Western Australia.

The paper has a circulation of 64, 063 and covers the City of Swan and the Perth Hills, including the Shire of Mundaring and the City of Kalamunda.
