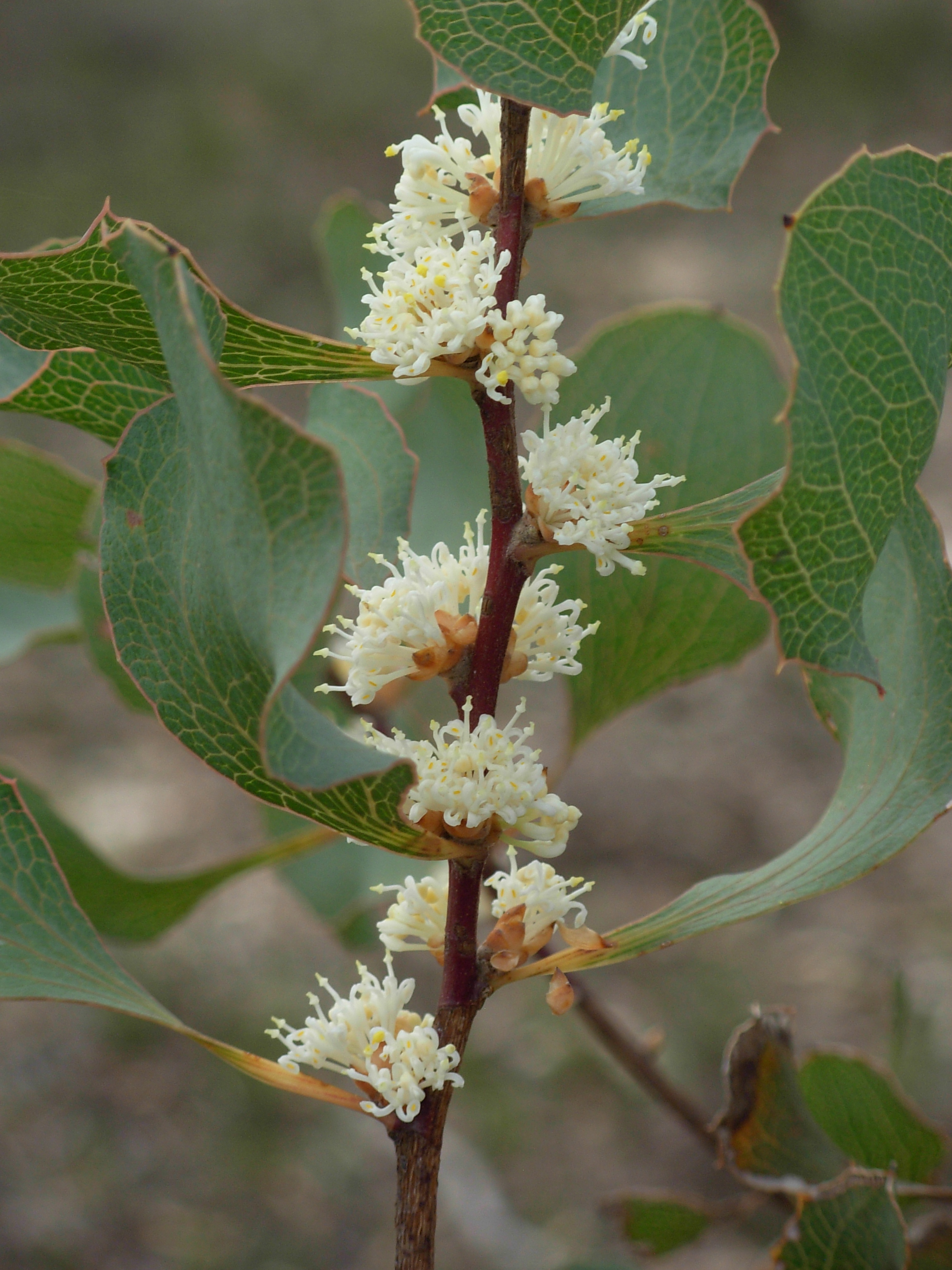
- Hakea cristata

Conservation status
- Near Threatened (IUCN 3.1)

Scientific classification
- Kingdom: Plantae
- Clade: Tracheophytes
- Clade: Angiosperms
- Clade: Eudicots
- Order: Proteales
- Family: Proteaceae
- Genus: Hakea
- Species: H. cristata

Binomial name
- Hakea cristata R.Br.
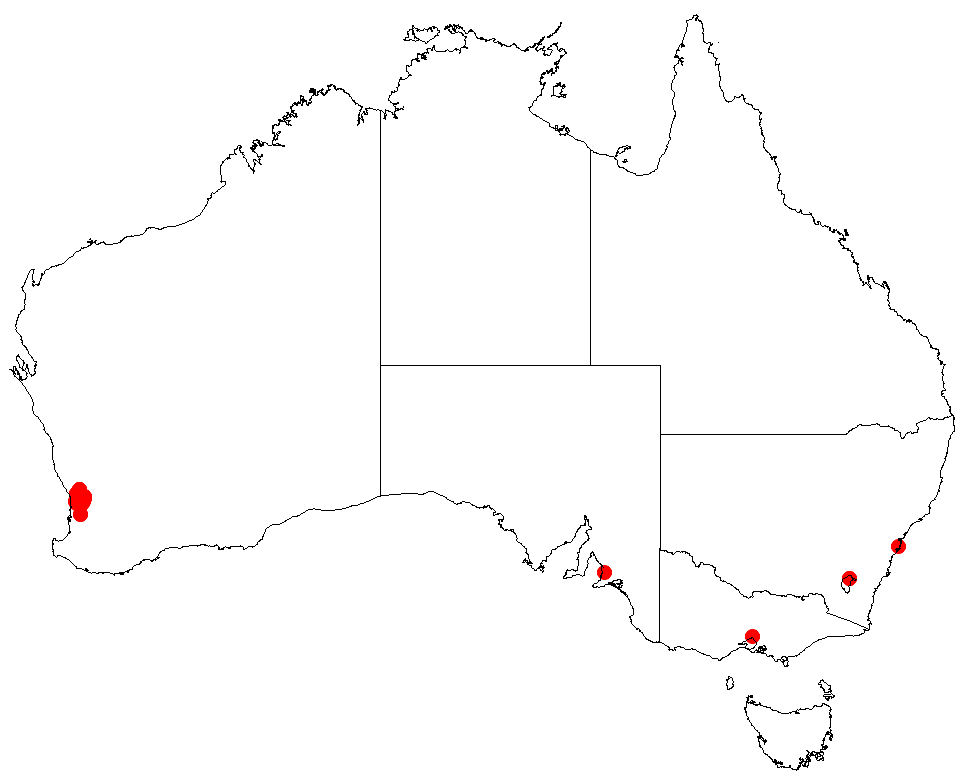

- Occurrence data from Australasian Virtual Herbarium Fruit

= Hakea cristata =

Snail hakea

Species of shrub found in Western Australia

Hakea cristata, commonly known as the snail hakea, is a shrub in the family Proteaceae native to Western Australia. An ornamental prickly shrub with attractive foliage and creamy white rounded flowers appearing in profusion in the winter months.

== Description ==
Hakea cristata is a straggly, upright, multi-stemmed shrub typically growing to a height of 1 to 3.5 metres (3 to 11 ft), smaller branches smooth. The leaves grow alternately are more or less egg-shaped tapering toward the base, 4.5 to 8 centimetres (1.8 to 3.1 in) long and 2 to 5 cm (0.8 to 2.0 in) wide. The leaf margins are toothed and prickly, new growth smooth and an attractive pink-reddish colour. The smooth mid-green leaves have a central vein ending in a stiff sharp point. Each inflorescence is composed of 24–42 faintly scented cream white flowers and appear in upper leaf axils from May to August. The perianth is 2 to 4 mm (0.079 to 0.157 in) long and smooth. The style is smooth. The fruit distinguish this species having a toothed crest that runs along each side of the underside of the fruit valve ending in a triangular horn at the apex. Fruit grow at an angle on the stalk are egg-shaped 3.5 to 5 cm (1.4 to 2.0 in) long and 2.3 to 3 cm (0.91 to 1.18 in) wide. The surface has spiky toothed ridges, fruit may remain green even at maturity. The winged elliptic seeds are 3 to 3.4 cm (1.18 to 1.34 in) long.

== Taxonomy and naming ==
Hakea cristata was first formally described by the botanist Robert Brown in 1830 and published in Supplementum primum prodromi florae Novae Hollandiae. The specific epithet (cristata) is derived from the Latin word cristatus meaning "tufted" or "crested", referring to the crests along each side of the fruit.

== Distribution and habitat ==
The snail hakea is specifically associated with lateritic soils and granite outcrops in the jarrah forests of the Darling Scarp between Chittering and Mundaring. It is usually part of open Eucalyptus wandoo woodland communities.
