= Hills, Western Australia =

Hills, Western Australia may refer to:

- Perth Hills
- Wongan Hills, Western Australia
