= Regional parks in Western Australia =

The regional parks of Perth, Western Australia

Regional parks in Western Australia are conservation areas with the purpose of serving as urban havens to preserve and restore cultural heritage and valuable ecosystems as well as to encourage sustainable nature-based recreation activities.

As of 2021, there are eleven regional parks in the Perth region of Western Australia, as well as regional parks outside the metropolitan area.

Apart from the already existing regional parks, future proposals exist, like the recently approved Kalgulup Regional Park, located within the City of Bunbury, Shire of Capel, Shire of Dardanup and Shire of Harvey, which encompass the former Preston River to Ocean Regional Park proposal, proposed for almost 40 years, and the Leschenault Regional Park along the Collie and Brunswick Rivers.

Another one, the Darling Range Regional Park in the Darling Scarp, was proposed as the largest regional park in Australia, with 11,703 hectares, but never fully realised and eventually replaced by a number of smaller national and regional parks.

== History ==
The concept of regional spaces in Western Australia open to the public was first proposed in 1955, when the Stephenson-Hepburn Report recommended preserving private land for future public use in what would become the Perth Metropolitan Region in 1963. The Environmental Protection Authority (EPA) identified areas of significant conservation, landscape and recreation value in a report in 1983. In 1989, the state Government allocated the responsibility of managing regional parks to the Department of Conservation and Land Management.

A Regional Parks Taskforce was established in 1990 but the EPA reported in 1993 that the establishment of these parks encountered difficulties but, from the mid-1990s, a number of regional parks were established in Western Australia.

== List of Western Australian regional parks ==
The list of regional parks in Western Australia:

| Name | LGA | Size | Co-ordinates | Image | Source |
|---|---|---|---|---|---|
| Banyowla Regional Park | City of Gosnells City of Armadale | 2,607 ha (6,440 acres) | 32°03′15″S 116°02′27″E | | |
| Beeliar Regional Park | City of Cockburn City of Kwinana City of Melville | 3,171 ha (7,840 acres) | 32°10′03″S 115°49′57″E | | |
| Canning River Regional Park | City of Canning | 266 ha (660 acres) | 32°01′41″S 115°54′58″E | | |
| Chapman River Regional Park | City of Greater Geraldton | 300 ha (740 acres) | 28°43′35″S 114°37′16″E | | |
| Herdsman Lake Regional Park | City of Stirling | 400 ha (990 acres) | 31°55′12″S 115°48′25″E | | |
| Jandakot Regional Park | City of Armadale City of Canning City of Cockburn City of Gosnells City of Kwinana Shire of Serpentine-Jarrahdale | 2,362 ha (5,840 acres) | 32°12′20″S 115°52′41″E | | |
| Kalgulup Regional Park | City of Bunbury Shire of Capel Shire of Dardanup Shire of Harvey | 3,100 ha (7,700 acres) | 33°13′40″S 115°41′23″E | | |
| Meelup Regional Park | City of Busselton | 577 ha (1,430 acres) | 33°33′00″S 115°04′00″E | | |
| Mundy Regional Park | City of Kalamunda | | 31°59′47″S 116°1′49″E | | |
| Rockingham Lakes Regional Park | City of Rockingham | 4,270 ha (10,600 acres) | 32°17′44″S 115°47′26″E | | |
| Woodman Point Regional Park | City of Cockburn | 54 ha (130 acres) | 32°08′06″S 115°44′31″E | | |
| Wooroloo Regional Park | Shire of Mundaring | | 31°50′06″S 116°17′00″E | | |
| Wungong Regional Park | City of Armadale | | 32°11′59″S 116°03′46″E | | |
| Yellagonga Regional Park | City of Joondalup | 1,400 ha (3,500 acres) | 32°44′42″S 115°47′06″E | | |

== See also ==
- List of protected areas of Western Australia
