= Mundaring railway line =

Former railway branch line in Western Australia

The Mundaring branch railway is a historical section of the original Eastern Railway main line across the Darling Scarp in the Western Australian Government Railways (WAGR) system.

== Name variation ==
It has had a number of names in WAGR records – including:

- Smiths Mill Line (locality later known as Glen Forrest) after the Eastern Railway was moved to the new line to the north – 1890s to 1920s
- The Mundaring Loop, or Mundaring Line – 1930s to 1950s

There was confusion in the naming of the Mahogany Creek Deviation. The Mahogany Creek railway stopping place was on the Mundaring branch between Glen Forrest and Mundaring. However the Mahogany Creek Deviation was the incorrect name for the new line that followed the line of the Jane Brook to Mount Helena. It was on the second route of the Eastern Railway constructed in the 1880s to early 1890s, and it passed through the Swan View Tunnel, well to the north of the original Mahogany Creek stopping place and the creek itself.

== Connections ==
The branch commenced at Bellevue railway station, moving up the slope to Greenmount. Steep gradients and deviation inclines occurred through to Glen Forrest.

It connected with the newer line at Mount Helena.

Mundaring was the junction point where the Mundaring Weir branch railway commenced.

Timetabled passenger services on this branch (until closure in early 1954) tended to terminate at Sawyers Valley.

== Closure ==
Traffic ceased running in 1954; the line was closed by Parliament in 1966, the closure including divestment of the land of the rail route to the local council.

Following closure, it eventually became part of the Railway Reserve Heritage Trail.

== Stopping places and sidings ==
- Bellevue
- Greenmount
- Greenmount Quarry siding
- Mountain Quarry siding
  - Cape Horn, a section of line with accidents
- Boya
- Hudman Road Quarry siding
- Darlington
- Glen Forrest, originally Smith's Mill
- Statham Brickworks Siding
- Nyaannia
- Zamia, highest point on line at 307 metres (1,007 ft)
- Mundaring
- Mundaring Weir railway line just east of Mundaring railway yard
- Sawyers Valley
- Mount Helena
