= Lake Leschenaultia =

Lake in Perth, Western Australia

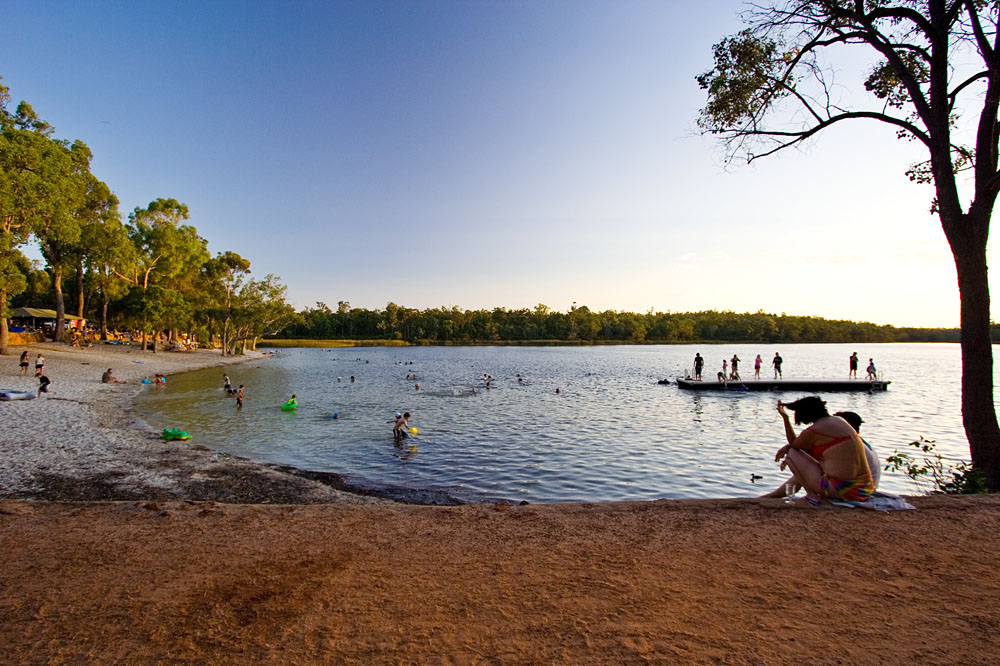
- The beach and pontoon at the north-eastern end of the lake

- Location within Western Australia
- Interactive map of Lake Leschenaultia
- Location: Western Australia
- Coordinates: 31°51′15″S 116°15′2″E
- Type: reservoir
- Basin countries: Australia
- Water volume: 520 million litres (420 acre⋅ft)

Western Australia Heritage Register
- Designated: 3 June 2005
- Reference no.: 8568

Lake Leschenaultia, Western Australia is a former railway dam that is now a recreational lake in the Shire of Mundaring just north of the location of an important railway stopping place on the original Eastern Railway. The dam holds approximately 520 million litres of water.

== Location ==
It is located off Rosedale Road in Chidlow, about 45 minutes from Perth by car in the Perth Hills.

== History ==
Lake Leschenaultia is a man-made lake constructed c.1897 as key infrastructure for the Western Australian Government Railways. It is the largest reservoir constructed on the Eastern Railway line and supplied water to steam trains for almost 50 years. Since 1949 it has been used as a recreation area for both locals, interstate and overseas visitors. Many locals learned to swim at the Lake, especially before the 1960s when there were no public swimming pools available locally. In 2005, Lake Leschenaultia gained a heritage listing based on the railway history, recreational significance and other factors. In 2006, the 40m timber jetty (constructed in 1971) was removed due to safety issues and has since been replaced with a pontoon. Since early in 2007, Lake Leschenaultia has been the venue for the monthly local market.

The name "Leschenaultia" comes from the lake colour's resemblance to the Blue Leschenaultia flower.

== Attractions and facilities ==
water spilling from Lake Leschenaultia over the spillway August 2025

The recreational area adjoining the lake is managed by the Shire of Mundaring, which, as of January 2013, does not charge an entry fee. However, costs apply for camping, canoe hire and picnic area hire. The lake is advertised as offering a number of attractions, including picnics and camping; physical activities such as bushwalking, canoeing and swimming; and views of native flora and fauna, such as birdwatching. Facilities provided include a café, kiosk, toilets, playground, barbecues, picnic areas, grassed areas, camp ground with camp kitchen and walking and cycling trails. No dogs or fishing are allowed.
