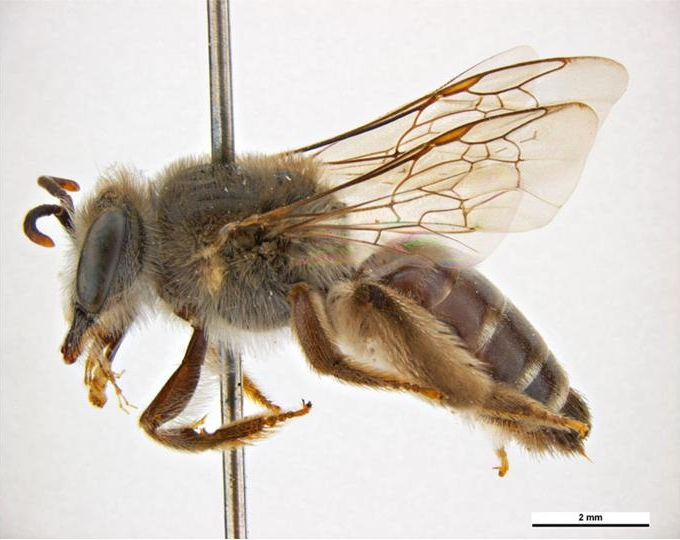
- Female

Scientific classification
- Kingdom: Animalia
- Phylum: Arthropoda
- Clade: Pancrustacea
- Class: Insecta
- Order: Hymenoptera
- Family: Colletidae
- Genus: Leioproctus
- Species: L. floccosus

Binomial name
- Leioproctus floccosus Maynard 1992

= Leioproctus floccosus =

Species of bee

Leioproctus floccosus, or Leioproctus (Cladocerapis) floccosus, is a species of bee in the family Colletidae and subfamily Colletinae. It is endemic to Australia. It was described by Australian entomologist Glynn Maynard in 1992.

== Etymology ==
The specific epithet floccosus (Latin: "with tufted hair") is an anatomical reference.

== Description ==
Female body length is about 10 mm. Integumental colouration is mainly black, the metasoma very dark red-brown; the hair is white, with lateral tufts on the metasoma.

== Distribution and habitat ==
The species occurs in south-west Western Australia. The type locality is The Dell, near Mundaring.

== Behaviour ==
The adults are flying mellivores.
