= Leschenaultia (disambiguation) =

Leschenaultia, or Leschenaultia is the name of plants, animals, and places that refer to Jean-Baptiste Leschenault de La Tour

- Leschenaultia, a genus of insects in the family Tachinidae
- Leschenaultia, a spelling variant and synonym of the plant genus Lechenaultia
- Leschenault's leaf-toed gecko
- Lake Leschenaultia, a lake in Western Australia
