= Mount Helena Tavern =

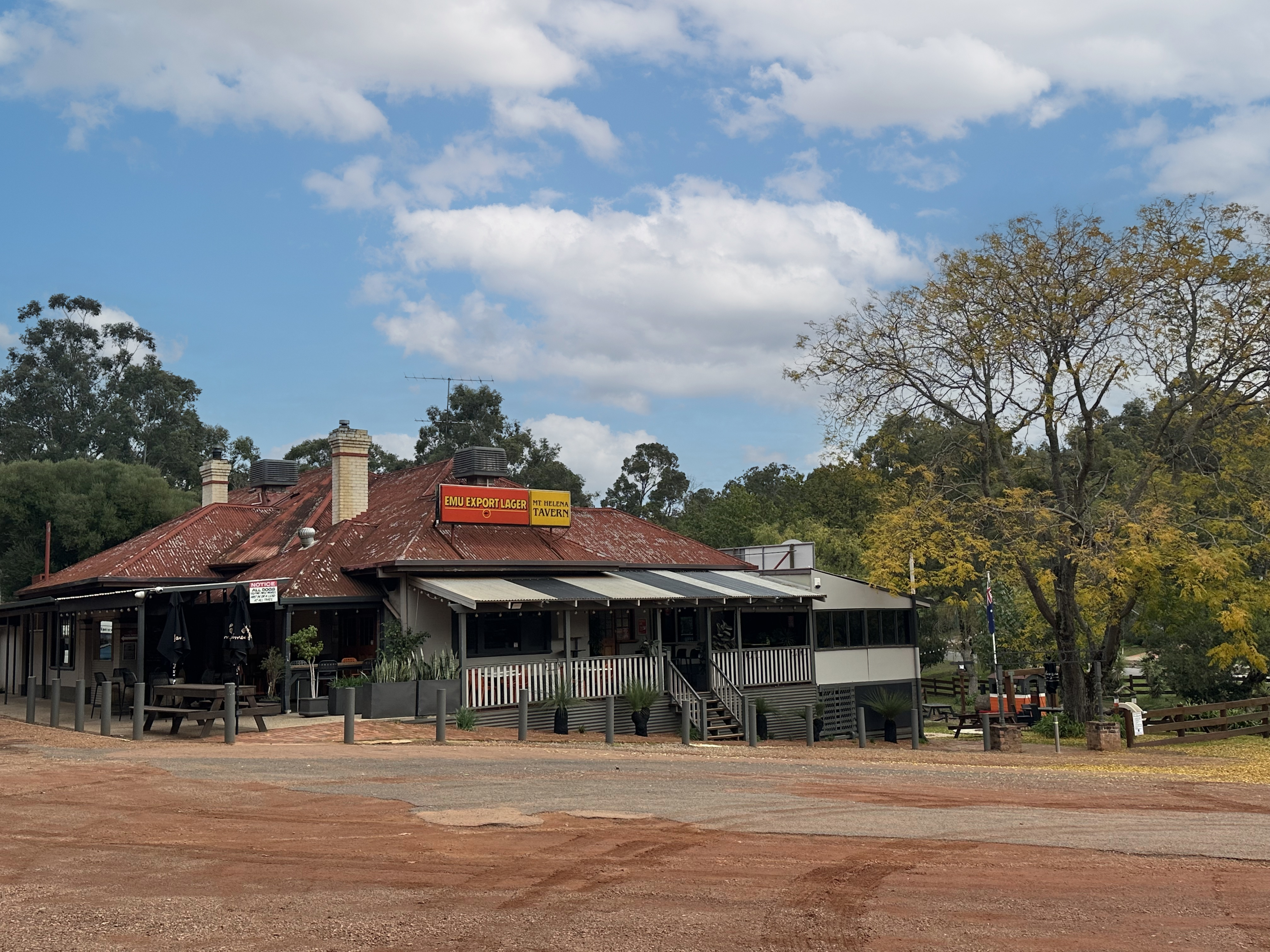
- Former names: Lion Mill Hotel; Mount Helena Hotel

General information
- Status: Trading
- Type: Tavern
- Location: 900 Keane Street Street W, Mount Helena, Australia
- Coordinates: 31.8796°S 116.2079°E
- Opened: 1902

Website
- http://www.mounthelenatavern.com/

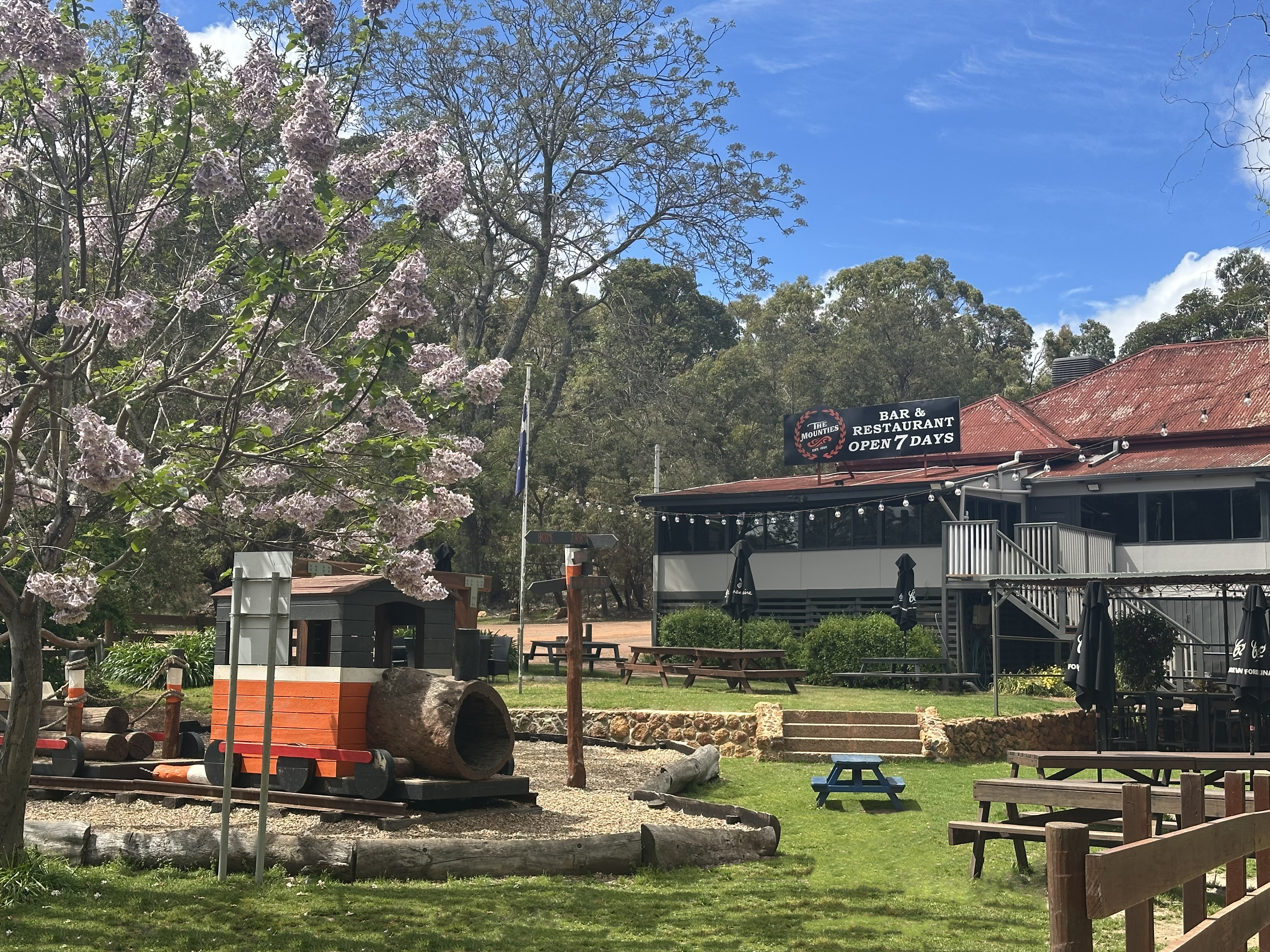
Mount Helena Tavern playground and partial building

The Mount Helena Tavern was opened in 1902 in Mount Helena, a hills suburb of Perth, Western Australia. It was originally called the Lion Mill Hotel, then the Mount Helena Hotel, before acquiring its current name. Locally it is referred to as The Mounties.

== History ==
In 1882 Mount Helena began as White's Mill. The timber mill was established to provide sleepers for the Eastern Railway that linked Guildford to Chidlow's Well. White's Mill closed in 1888 and was replaced by Lion Mill.

Due to logging and the junction of two railway lines, Ernest Forsyth built and licensed a hotel. The original weatherboard Lion Mill Hotel was built by local carpenters and completed in September 1902. The land and finance for the hotel came from local timber mill owner Richard Hummerston.

After opening the tavern, the license was transferred months later to Frederick Foweraker in December 1902.

Foweraker and his wife also served as the local ambulance, administering first aid to the serious injuries that occurred in the local sawmills. The townspeople raised money to obtain an ambulance chest for them and have the Foweraker's run first aid classes for local people.

Since opening, the Tavern served as a meeting place for those living in or visiting the district, hosting dances and public meetings. It also hosts local cricket and football teams, politicians and even log chopping competitions.

In 1908 Mitchell Graham became licensee and in 1909 was charged and found guilty with watering his whisky.

In recent times the venue has featured in news articles for more positive reasons. In January 2025 The West Australian dedicated a piece to its annual Australia Day celebrations and in September 2025 Perth Now mentioned the venue as a great place to watch the 2025 AFL Grand Final on their big screen TV.

The Tavern has been finalists in numerous competitions in the 21st century such as:

- 2023 AHA Hospitality Awards For Excellence in the following categories; Bar team award, family dining award, outdoor area award and redeveloped venue award.
- 2023 AHA Best Steak Sandwich top 3 final cook-off
- 2024 Voted top 3 in the Triple M's best pub in Perth competition

The tavern has changed hands many times over the years and licensees have included Thomas Radley, Ethel Bullen, Cornelius Sheahan, Stan O'Grady, William Harburn and Murray Collins. The licensee is currently Dannyel Broadbent, she has been running the venue since late 2013.

During the First World War route marches were conducted by the Australian Army from Blackboy Hill training camp in Greenmount to the hotel, and the hotel provided entertainments for returning wounded soldiers.

The town was renamed Mount Helena in 1924 and industry changed from saw mills to fruit growers and poultry farmers. In 1925 the tavern changed name from the Lion Mill Hotel to the Mount Helena Hotel.

In 1940 Bernard McGrath was charged with the unlawful killing of Henry Tilbrook after a fight in the carpark of the Tavern. After a four-day trial McGrath was found not guilty of the crime.

== Architectural character ==
The Mount Helena Tavern is a single story, iron roofed, weatherboard building adjacent to the Railway Reserve Heritage Trail. The building has a true-blue Australian feel, having been added to at various times along with verandas but maintains the expression of when it was originally built. Internally the tavern has been modified and several walls removed however much of the original structure remains with original exposed lath and plaster visible in the restaurant. The venues outdoor setting has upgraded over time with a large screen TV featuring in the beer garden. An orange train in the playground reflects the logging history of the town.

== Heritage value ==
The Mount Helena Tavern has an aesthetic, social and historic significance for the Mount Helena community and the community's contribution to the development of Perth through its timber and fruit growing industry.

In 2016 the Mount Helena Tavern was listed on Western Australia's Heritage Register for the contribution made by the place to Western Australia's social heritage.
