= John Joseph Jones (writer) =

Australian musician and writer

- Born: 3 February 1930; London, England, United Kingdom
- Died: August 2000 (aged 70)
- Education: University of Western Australia
- Occupations: Poet; folk singer; musician; playwright; theatre director

John Joseph Jones (3 February 1930– August 2000) was a British and Australian poet, folk singer, musician, playwright, and theatre director.

== Biography ==
Born in London in 1930, Jones first arrived in Australia in 1948. Between 1950 and 1952, he worked briefly in England, Canada, and Fiji, but settled permanently in Australia in 1952. He graduated from University of Western Australia with a Bachelor of Arts, majoring in Anthropology and English (1959).

He lived in Parkerville and developed and sustained the Parkerville Amphitheatre during his lifetime. The amphitheatre became the site for a number of 1970s concerts, including John Farnham, Cold Chisel, and Jo Jo Zep and the Falcons. A documentary on the Parkerville Amphitheatre, "Sets, Bugs & Rock n Roll", by Tempest Productions, was shown at the Revelation Film Festival in Perth in July 2015.

=== Music ===
- Condamine Bells: Songs and Stories of the Australian Outback, poems by Jack Sorensen, Joseph Jones and Patsy Durack. Perth, W.A.: Carroll's, 1961
- Australian New Folk and Art Songs: with full piano accompaniments and guitar chord symbols by John Joseph Jones. Kewdale, W.A.: John Joseph Jones, 1966
- A Singer and his Songs of Early Australia, Sydney: Southern Music, 1970
- Pipedream: original libretto with revisions and additions by the librettist, by John Joseph Jones; set to music by Kevin Fenner. Perth, W.A.: Hovea Music Press, 1995

=== Poetry ===
- Love, with paintings by Astrid Dahl. Perth, W.A.: Artlook Books, 1983
- A Day at Hiroshima, Parkerville and other poems, with drawings by Lawrence John Jones, Hovea, W.A.: Parkerville Amphitheatre, 1983
- Three Poems of Celebration, with artwork by Daniel Argyle. Claremont, W.A.: Hovea Press, 1994
- Summertime Poems, with artwork by Lawrence John Jones, Claremont, W.A.: Hovea Press, 1994
- The love sonnets of John Joseph Jones: a guide to the archival resource manuscripts available with notes on their composition, publication and other aspects. Parkerville Amphitheatre, 1999

=== Theatre ===
- The Undivided: a verse play in three acts. Foreword by E. J. Stormon. Perth: John Joseph Jones and Co. 1965
