= Sawyers Valley, Western Australia =

Sawyers Valley
- Suburb
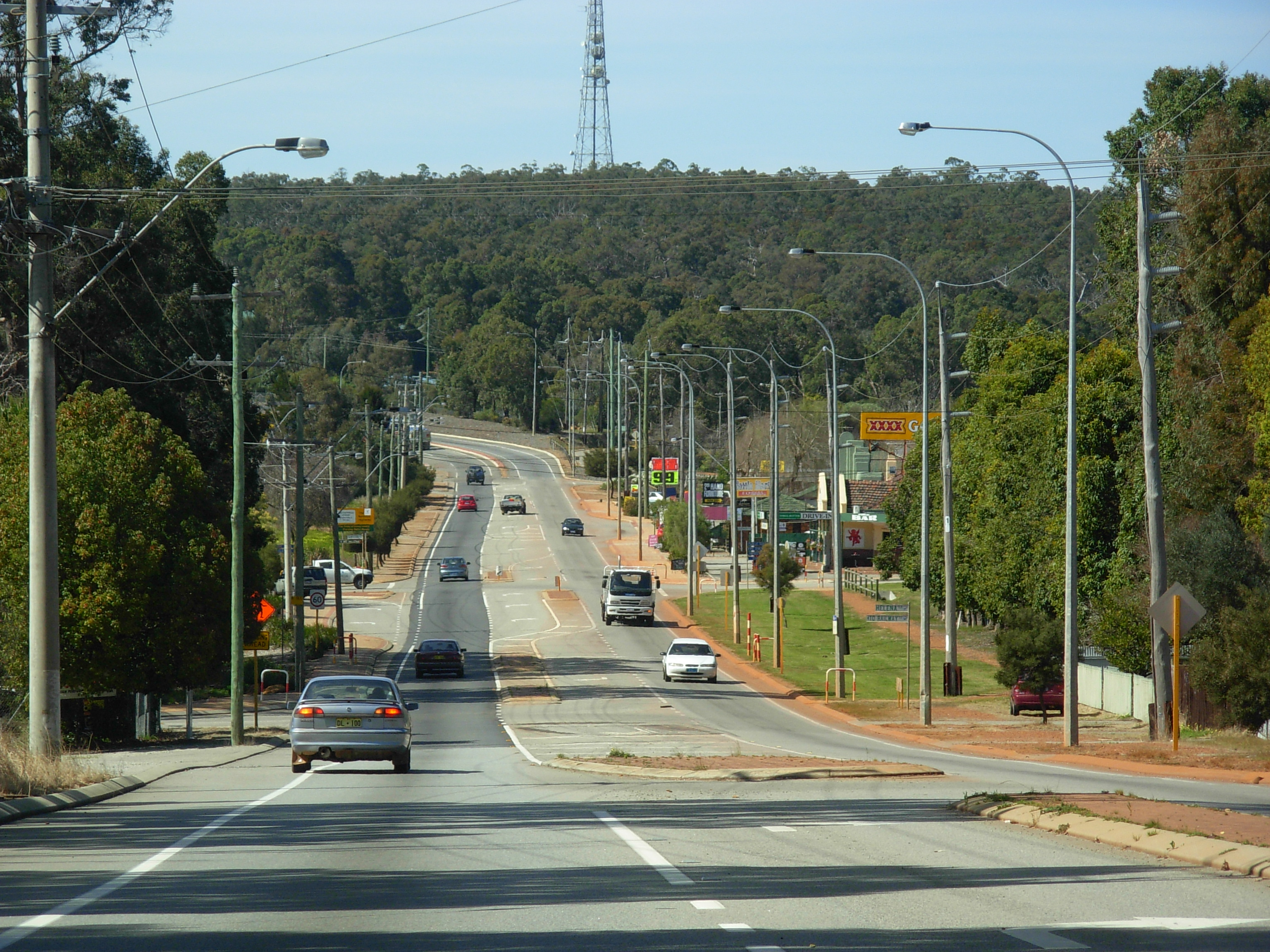
- Great Eastern Highway in Sawyers Valley from the west
- Interactive map of Sawyers Valley
- Coordinates: 31.946°S 116.246°E
- Country: Australia
- State: Western Australia
- City: Perth
- LGA: Shire of Mundaring

Government
  - State electorate: Electoral district of Darling Range
  - Federal division: Hasluck

Population
  - Total: 1,001 (SAL 2021)
- Postcode: 6074
Suburbs around Sawyers Valley
Stoneville	Mount Helena	Chidlow
Mundaring	Sawyers Valley	Gorrie
Mundaring Weir	Reservoir	Reservoir

Sawyers Valley is sited on the Great Eastern Highway about 40 kilometres from Perth, Western Australia in the Shire of Mundaring. The community began as a sawmill and railway siding to process timber from the forest surrounding the Helena River to the south. Local employment included forest and Goldfields Water Supply Scheme maintenance, small orchards, and the Midland Railway Workshops. The suburb's name comes from the occupation of many of the first European settlers to the area in the 1860s, who were sawyers working at the local saw-pits. The Sawyers Valley Tavern, which sits on the Highway opposite the Railway Reserve Heritage Trail, was first established in 1882 and the Sawyers Valley railway station was built in 1884.

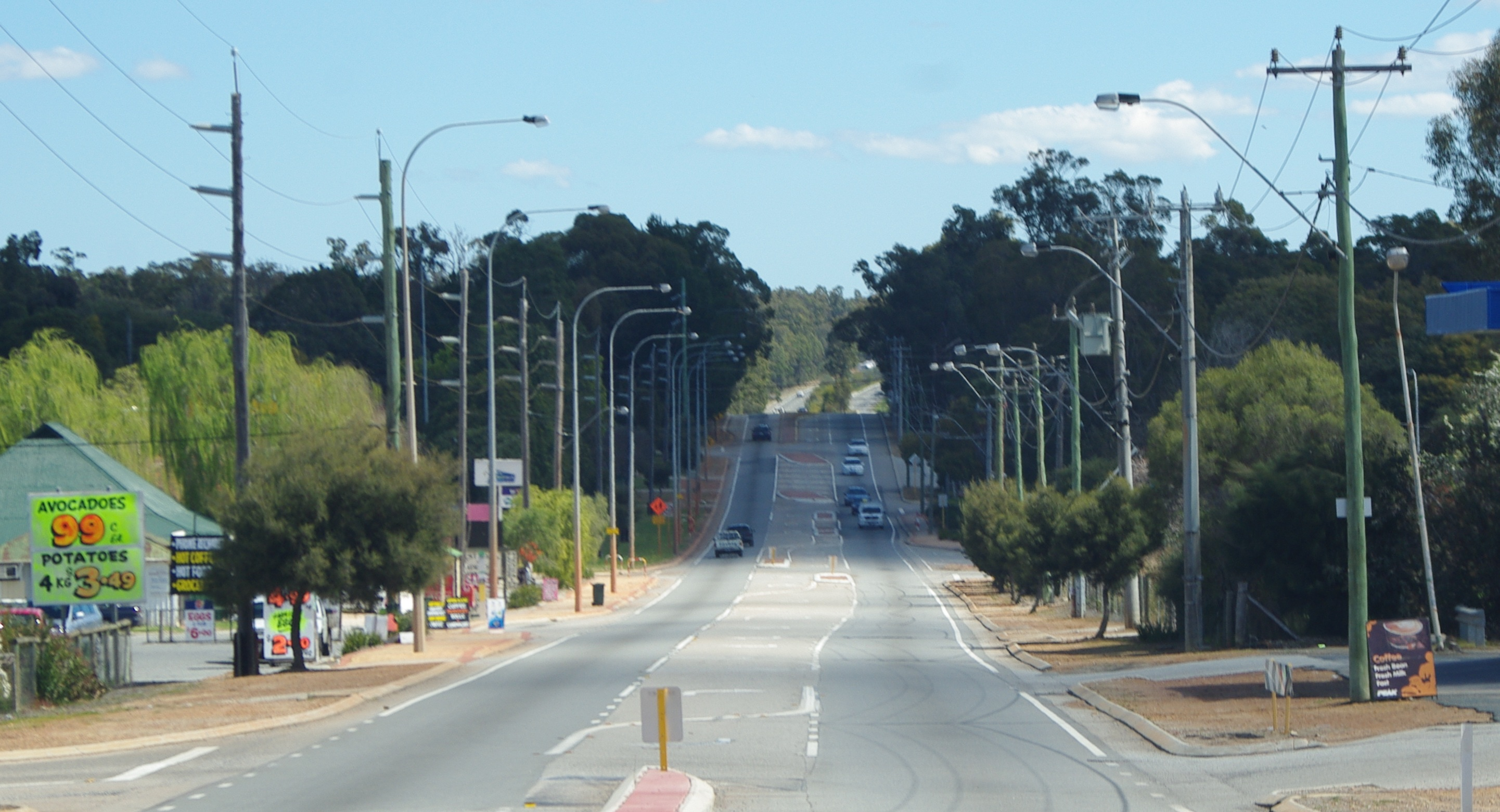
Looking west - Great Eastern Highway through Sawyers Valley in 2010

== Local activities ==
The Sawyers Valley township, situated on the north-east corner of Beelu National Park, has many active sporting and community groups, including the Sawyers Valley Voluntary Bush Fire Brigade and the Sawyers Valley Primary School.

The Railway Reserve Heritage Trail and the Golden Pipeline Heritage Trail pass through Sawyers Valley.
