= Mahogany Creek, Western Australia =

Mahogany Creek
- Suburb
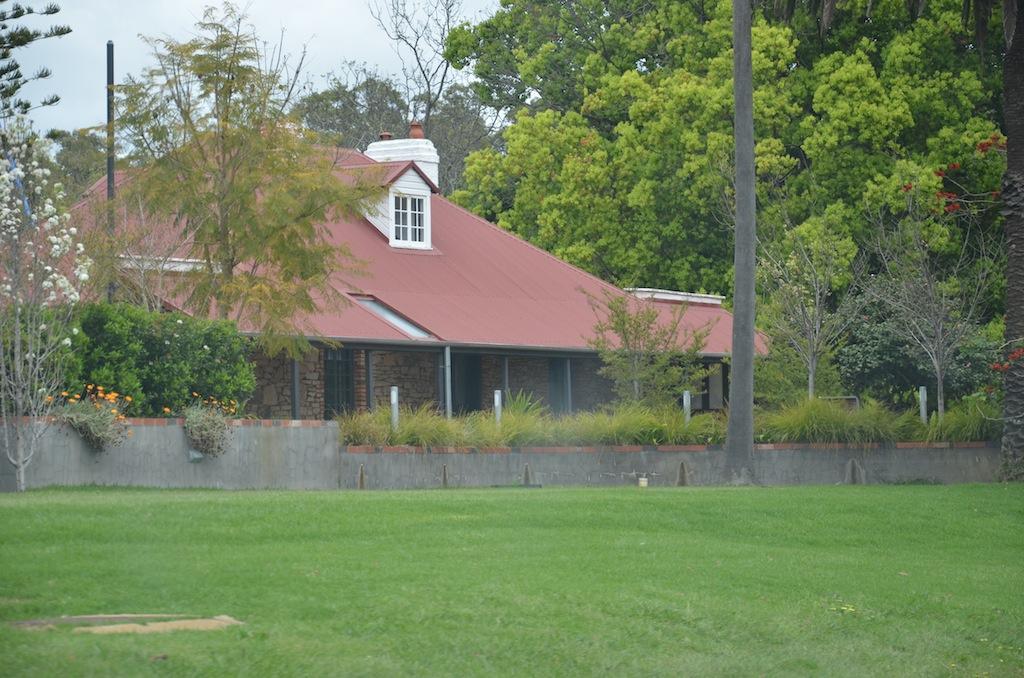
- Mahogany Inne old building facing Great Eastern Highway
- Interactive map of Mahogany Creek
- Coordinates: 31.906°S 116.135°E
- Country: Australia
- State: Western Australia
- City: Perth
- LGA: Shire of Mundaring

Government
  - State electorate: Swan Hills
  - Federal division: Bullwinkel

Population
  - Total: 829 (SAL 2021)
- Postcode: 6072
Suburbs around Mahogany Creek
Hovea	Parkerville	Parkerville
Glen Forrest	Mahogany Creek	Mundaring
Glen Forrest	Paulls Valley	Mundaring

Mahogany Creek is a suburb of Perth, the state capital of Western Australia. It is part of the Shire of Mundaring local government area.

Its name is derived from the historic Mahogany Inn, constructed in about 1880, and situated on what was the York Road, now known as the Great Eastern Highway. The inn is heritage listed.

"Swan River Mahogany" was the name by which Eucalyptus marginata, one of the colony's earliest exports, was known in its European market.

Mahogany Creek is also the location of the steepest section of the Great Eastern Highway after Greenmount Hill.

The suburb had a population of 763 in 1991, and in 1996 it was 822.

There was a railway station on the original route of the Eastern Railway, and there have been a number of shops close to the railway station. Only one remains, now an antique shop.

== Transport ==
=== Bus ===
- 320 Midland Station to Mundaring – serves Great Eastern Highway, Brooking Road, Strettle Road and Homestead Road
- 328 Midland Station to Chidlow – serves Great Eastern Highway
