= Parkerville Tavern =

Hotel in Parkerville, Western Australia

The Parkerville Tavern
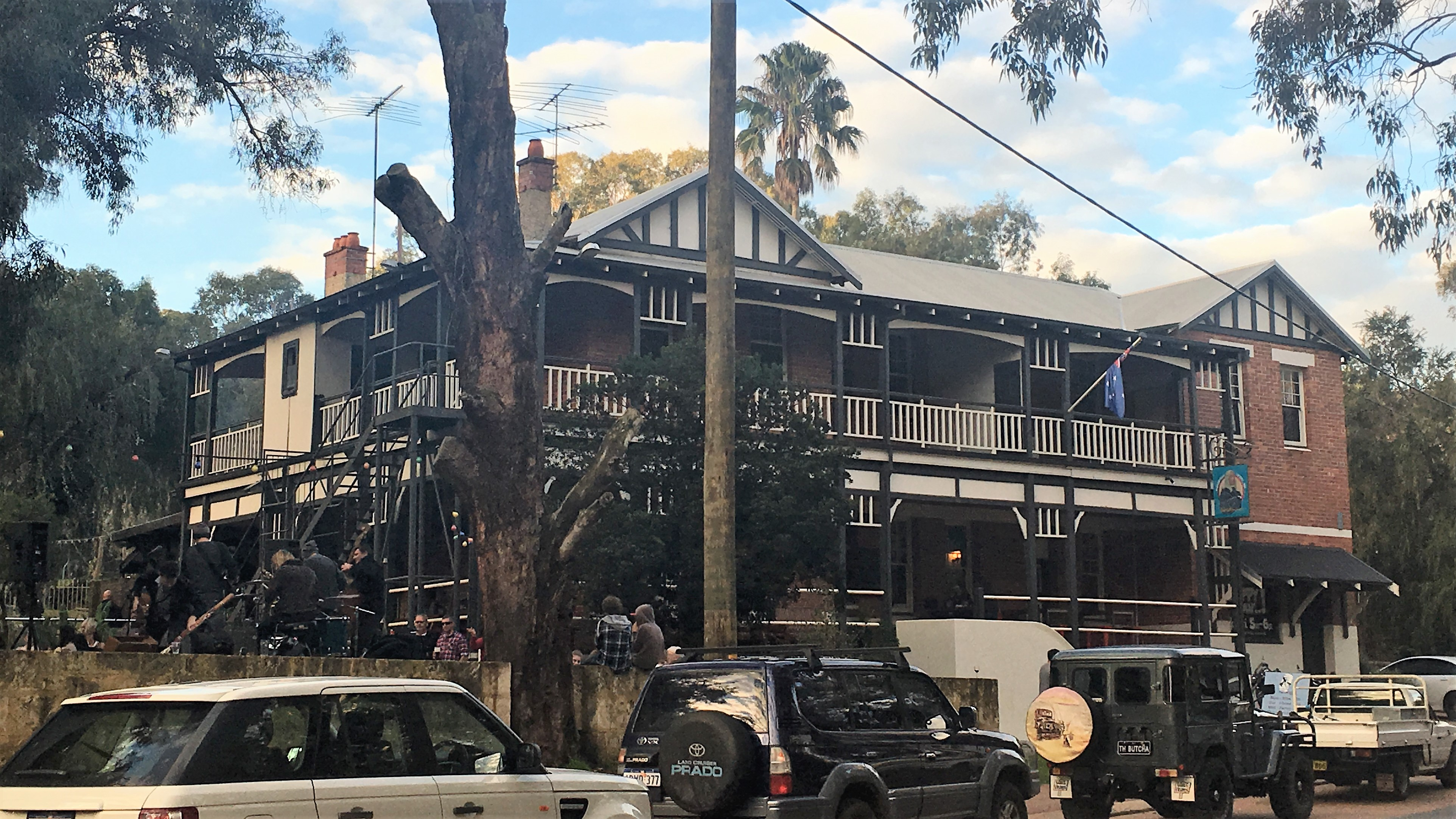
- Interactive map of the The Parkerville Tavern area
- Former names: The Railway Hotel; The Parkerville Hotel

General information
- Status: Trading
- Type: Hotel
- Location: 6 Owen Road, Parkerville, Australia
- Coordinates: 31.8772°S 116.1359°E
- Opened: 1902
- Landlord: T’Anne Mills and Ryan Chandler since December 2019

Website
- http://www.parkervilletavern.com.au/

The Parkerville Tavern was opened in 1902 in Parkerville a hills suburb of Perth, Western Australia. It was originally called The Railway Hotel and later The Parkerville Hotel before adopting its current name in the 1970s.

== Killing of Joseph Ottey ==
Joseph Ottey was a timber worker in the Western Ranges of Victoria. He had a reputation for a violent temper and was routinely cruel to his family and animals. He had threatened to kill his wife Alice and his assaults had left her unconscious. The gold rushes bought many timber workers to Western Australia to provide wood for the buildings and railways. In 1896, Joseph Ottey, with his wife and eight children, took up 22 acres (8.9 ha) in the new land division of Parkerville and they built their timber and iron house where the Tavern stands now.

His daughter Catherine obtained work in Kalgoorlie. One day one of her younger brothers showed at her house having walked the 550 kilometres (340 mi) distance after a particularly bad beating. Joseph showed within days and the Police required her brother to return to Parkerville with him. Alice attempted to obtain a restraining order from the Magistrate in Guildford but was unsuccessful.

On 4 December 1900 Joseph and Alice Ottey entered into a violent fight. He first beat his son and then Catherine who had returned home. Joseph grabbed Alice by the throat pushing her onto a table. Catherine fearing for her mother’s life grabbed a revolver from the bedroom and returning to the kitchen shot her father twice. He continued to fight but now they could escape. The police were called and Joseph conveyed to Guildford but he died whilst being operated on.

Catherine was first accused of wilful murder, but this was later changed to manslaughter. The case was led by Robert Burnside for the prosecution and Frederick Moorhead for the defence. On 18 March 1901, after hearing the long history of domestic violence, the jury, took only five minutes to return a verdict of not guilty.

== History ==
In 1902, widow Alice Ottey obtained a wine and beer licence for her house. The premises were known as The Railway Hotel. With many squatters living in the surrounding bush and a flurry of activity from the local sawmills, gravel quarry, and fruit orchards, it wasn’t long before the hotel was reported to be “in full swing”. Catherine married and returned to Kalgoorlie. Alice married Charles Hebb. Alice rented the hotel to W. W. Bramwell and subsequently to W.H. Angove. Angove made substantial additions to the place and received a full public house licence, changing the name to The Parkerville Hotel.

The Parkerville Tavern closed in 1921 and reopened in 1928. The tavern has had numerous owners since then including Robert Congdon, Eileen Smith, Bill Harrison, Gary Manolas, Thomas Martin and Ian O’Connor.

The Tavern has always remained a social hub for Parkerville, enjoying Celebrations, Dancing, Motorcycle runs, Wood chopping and Sunday sessions. The Tavern survived a fire in 1990 and has had further restoration work.

The Parkerville Tavern’s name board features Sir Stephen Henry Parker, whom the town was named after.

There is a 5-acre (2.0 ha) park behind the tavern named The Alice Hebb Reserve.

== Architectural character ==
The Tavern is a brick, two storey building, sitting close to the road overlooking the Jane Brook and Railway Reserve Heritage Trail. It has large verandas and balustrades on both floors across most of the south and west facing frontages which contributes to the building's impact on its surroundings. The timber veranda detailing has arched underside veranda beams together with unflamboyant ladder friezes; the dominant projecting roof gables over the front veranda; the remnant of rough cast render combined with brickwork on the chimney are of a later 'Bungalow' style, whilst the rendered bands of brickwork, rendered sills and lintels, the double hung timber windows, Georgian mullioned in the top sash and the odd surviving elements of stained glass all express the building's character from the federation period.

== Heritage value ==
The Parkerville Tavern has very high aesthetic significance for the style, scale and landmark value the building has as well as high social significance for the role and focus the place has provided.

In 2016 the Parkerville Tavern was listed on Western Australia’s Heritage Register for the contribution made by the place to Western Australia’s cultural heritage.
