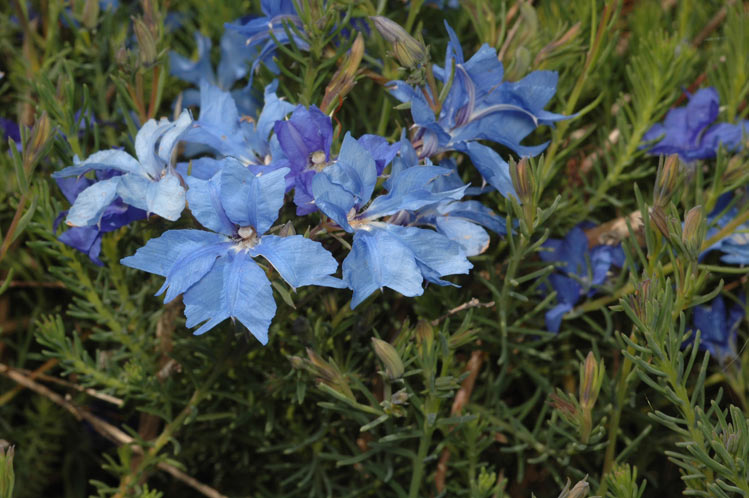

Scientific classification
- Kingdom: Plantae
- Clade: Embryophytes
- Clade: Tracheophytes
- Clade: Spermatophytes
- Clade: Angiosperms
- Clade: Eudicots
- Clade: Asterids
- Order: Asterales
- Family: Goodeniaceae
- Genus: Lechenaultia
- Species: L. biloba

Binomial name
- Lechenaultia biloba Lindl.

Synonyms
- Lechenaultia biloba Lindl. var. biloba; Lechenaultia drummondii de Vriese; Lechenaultia grandiflora DC. nom. illeg.; Lechenaultia grandiflora Lindl. nom. superfl.; Leschenaultia biloba Lindl. orth. var.; Leschenaultia drummondii de Vriese orth. var.; Leschenaultia grandiflora DC. orth. var.

= Lechenaultia biloba =

Blue leschenaultia

Species of flowering plant

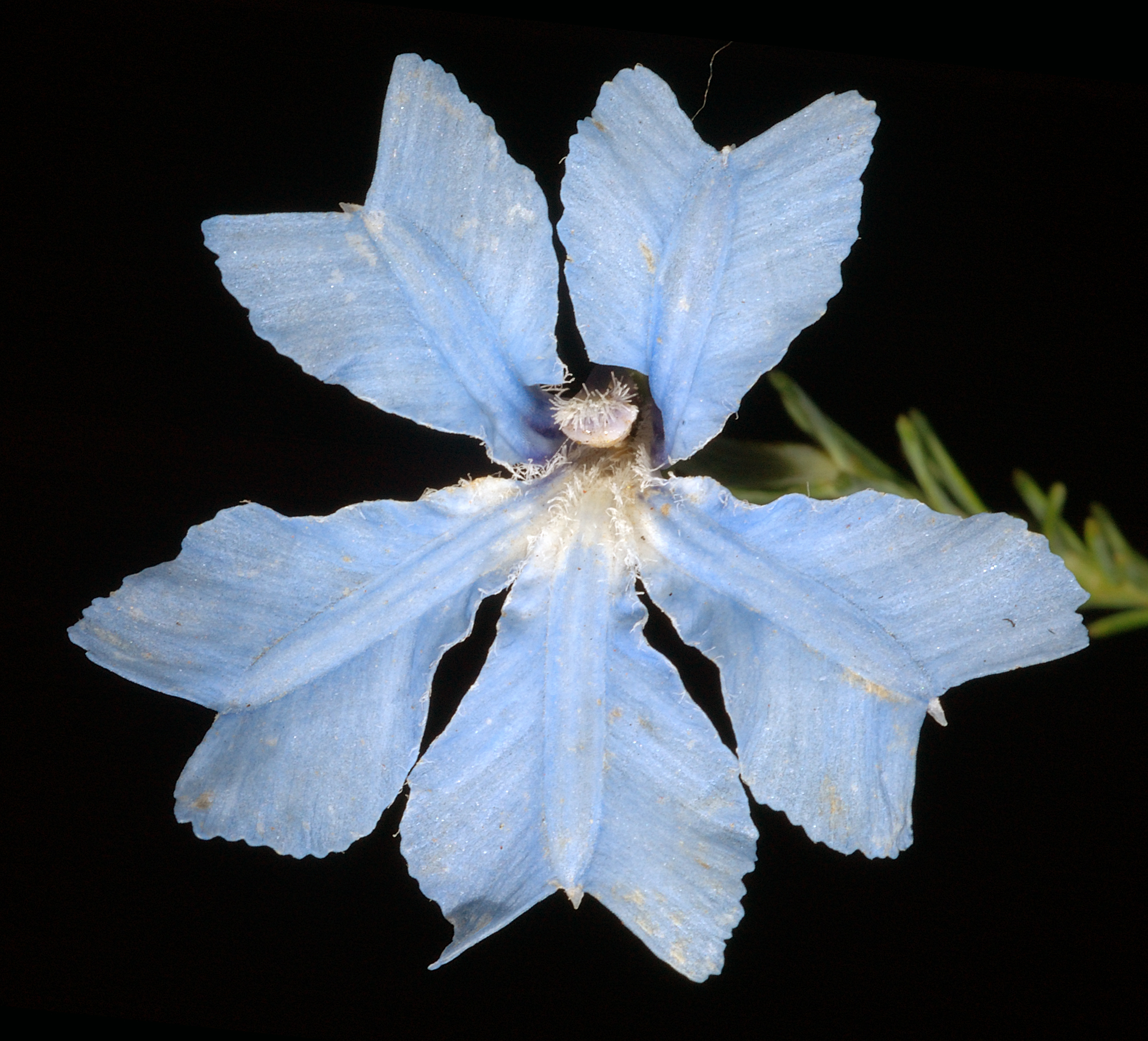
Flower detail

Lechenaultia biloba, commonly known as blue leschenaultia, is a species of flowering plant in the family Goodeniaceae and is endemic to the south-west of Western Australia. It is a glabrous herb or subshrub with spreading branches, thin, heathlike leaves and blue, tube-shaped flowers.

== Description ==
Lechenaultia biloba grows as a spreading shrub typically growing to a height of 100 cm (39 in), sometimes to 160 cm (63 in), and often forms suckers. The grey-green to green leaves are crowded, linear, 6–15 mm (0.24–0.59 in) long, about 1 mm (0.039 in) wide and fleshy. The flowers are arranged in compact clusters, the sepals 6–7 mm (0.24–0.28 in) long and the petals dark blue to light blue or cream-coloured, the range of colours sometimes appearing in a single population of plants. (Cream-coloured forms are found on the western sandplains). The petal wings are triangular to lobed and 3–6 mm (0.12–0.24 in) wide. Flowering takes place from July to December and the fruit is usually 23–25 mm (0.91–0.98 in) long.

== Taxonomy ==
Lechenaultia biloba was first formally described in 1839 by John Lindley in A Sketch of the Vegetation of the Swan River Colony. No type specimen was originally recorded, but David Morrison in his 1987 paper on the genus selected a lectotype that was collected in 1839 by James Drummond in the Swan River Colony. Augustin Pyramus de Candolle described L. grandiflora from a collection from the Vasse River, which was synonymised with L. biloba by George Bentham and subsequent authors. Lechenaultia biloba is the type species in the section Patentes in the genus. Its closest relatives (according to a cladogram based on morphological features) appear to be L. stenosepala, L. expansa and L. pulvinaris. The specific epithet (biloba) refers to the two petal lobes of the flowers. Blue lechenaultia is a very variable species.

== Distribution and habitat ==
Lechenaultia biloba is found across a wide swathe of Western Australia, from the Geraldton sandplains south through to the southwestern corner of the state and east to Esperance. It grows on granite- or laterite soils, where it is found on hills or flat areas.

== Use in horticulture ==
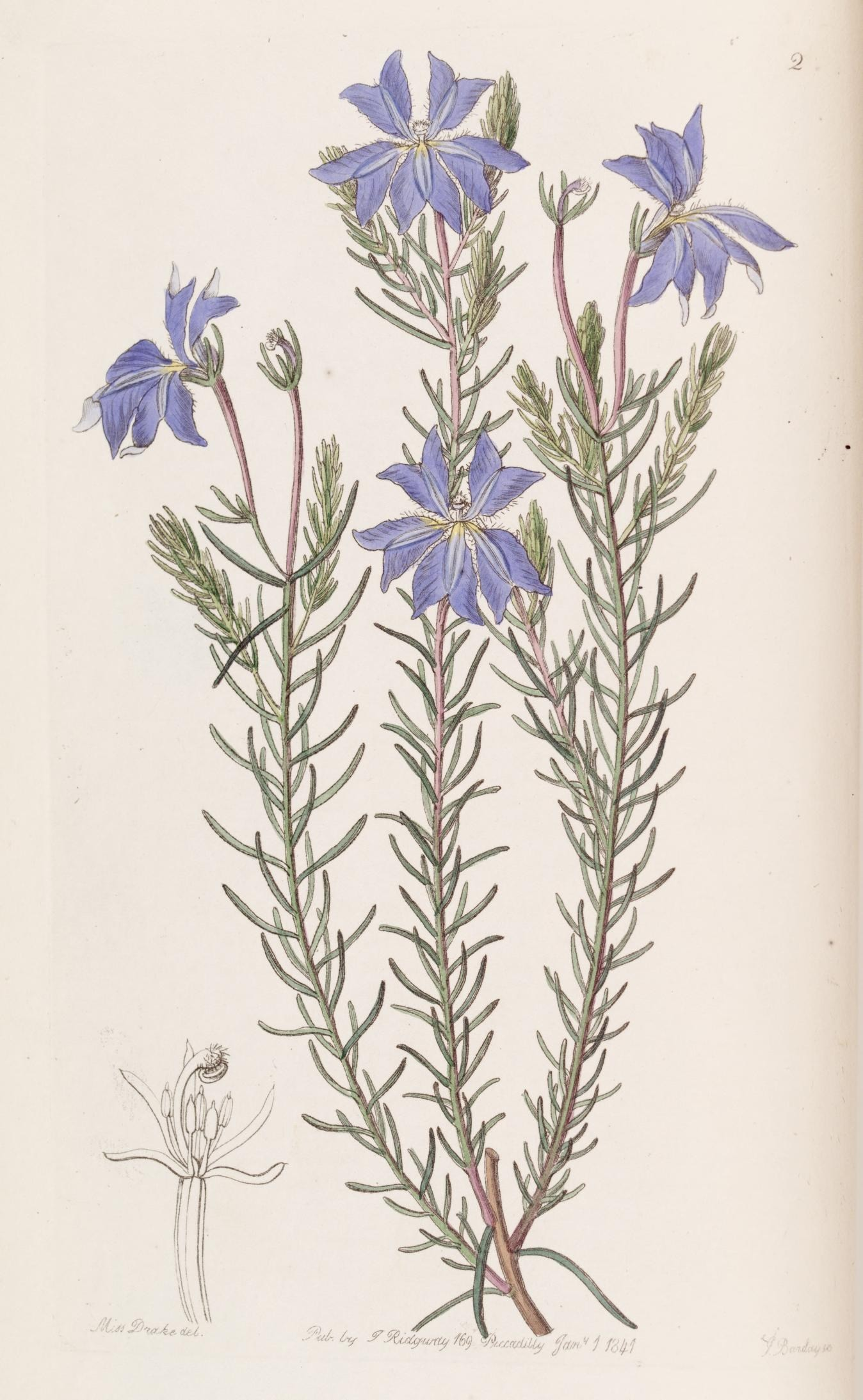
Illustration from Edwards's botanical register

The most familiar member of the genus, L. biloba is commonly grown in Australian gardens. Renowned for its vivid blue flowers, it was first grown in the United Kingdom in the 1840s. Many cultivars were sold in the 1960s that are no longer available. It grows best in well-ventilated locations with very good drainage, otherwise it is prone to fungal disease, in particular grey mould (Botrytis cinerea) of the branches and soil-borne Phytophthora and Pythium, and is often short-lived, lasting four to six years in a good location, or perishing within a year in a poor one. It is readily propagated by cuttings.

Lechenaultia biloba is grown in rockeries or hanging baskets.
