= Eastern Metropolitan Regional Council =

Regional local government body of Perth, Western Australia

The EMRC logo

The Eastern Metropolitan Regional Council (EMRC) is a regional local government body in Perth, Western Australia. The EMRC is composed of two member councils – the Town of Bassendean and City of Bayswater. The City of Kalamunda, Shire of Mundaring, City of Swan and City of Belmont were previously members.

== History ==
The EMRC was established in August 1983. While its original function was to provide large scale waste management and disposal services in Perth's eastern region, this has been extended to include urban and natural environmental services, waste management consultancy services, sustainability programs and circular economy initiatives.

In partnership with its member councils, the EMRC works to develop and implement suitable resource recovery solutions for Perth's eastern region. The EMRC also publishes various reports, strategies and information. The EMRC owns the Red Hill waste management facility and the Hazelmere Resource Recovery Park.

The City of Kalamunda joined in August 1995.

In 2021, the City of Belmont left the council, followed by the City of Kalamunda in 2023, and the Shire of Mundaring and City of Swan in 2025.
