= Parkerville, Western Australia =

Suburb of Perth, Western Australia

Parkerville
- Suburb
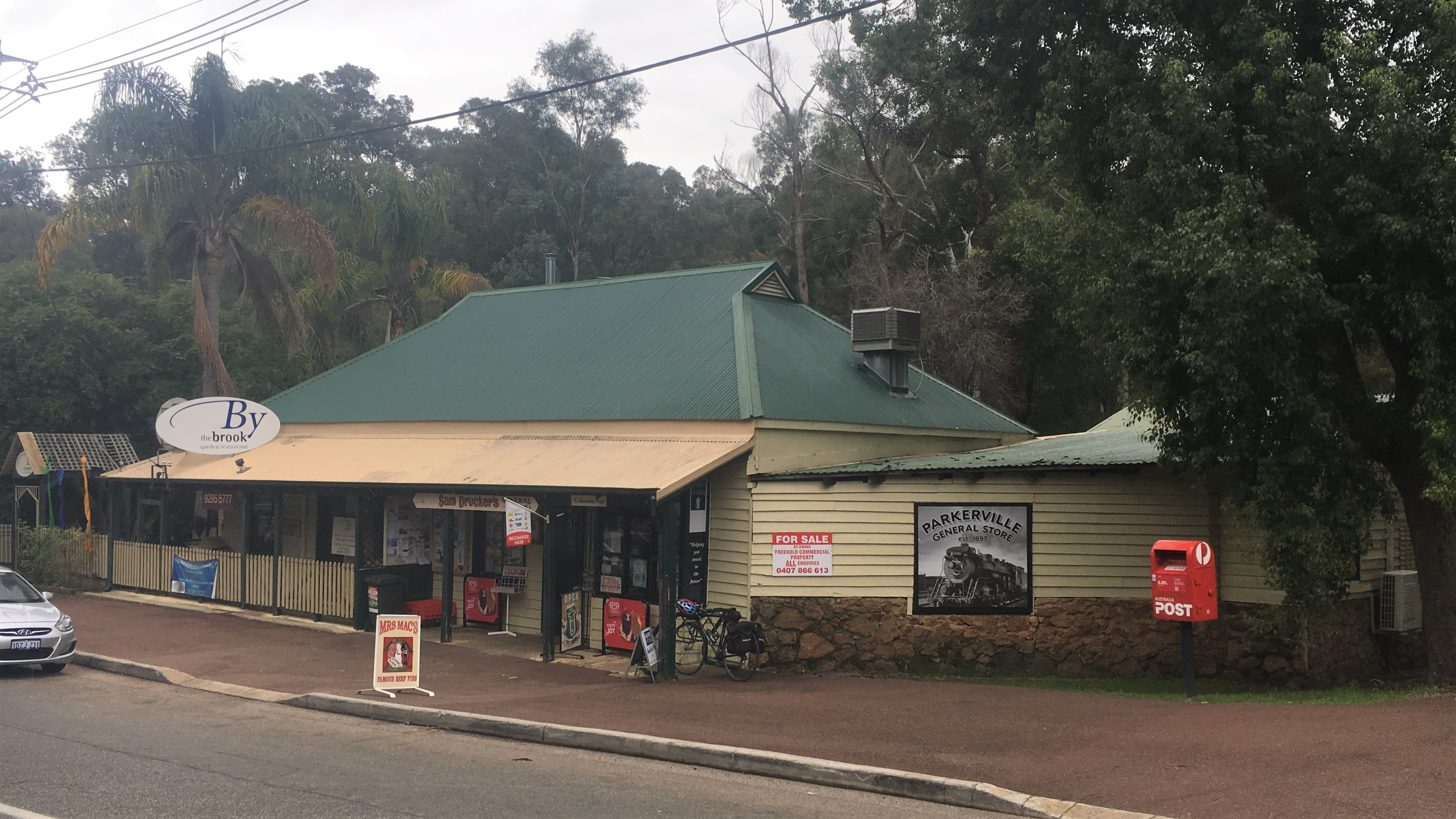
- Parkerville General Store
- Interactive map of Parkerville
- Coordinates: 31.874°S 116.145°E
- Country: Australia
- State: Western Australia
- City: Perth
- LGA: Shire of Mundaring

Government
  - State electorate: Swan Hills
  - Federal division: Bullwinkel

Population
  - Total: 2,432 (SAL 2021)
- Postcode: 6081
Suburbs around Parkerville
Red Hill	Gidgegannup	Gidgegannup
Hovea	Parkerville	Stoneville
Mahogany Creek	Mundaring	Mundaring

Parkerville is a suburb in the Shire of Mundaring in Perth Western Australia.

Jane Brook flows through Parkerville on its way down to the Swan River through John Forrest National Park.

== History ==
The Nyoongar people were the original custodians of the land. The arrival of British colonisers in 1829 on the Swan Coastal Plain eventually led to Nyoongar dispossession in the Hills behind Perth. The Parkerville Suburban Area was made open for selection in June 1895.

Parkerville was one of the first stations to be constructed on the railway line that once ran between Bellevue and Mount Helena, opening for traffic in 1896. The Railway Hotel, now the Parkerville Tavern, opened in 1902.

The town was named in honour of Stephen Henry Parker whose country home, now the Old Mahogany Inn, was situated nearby. Parker was a prominent member of Perth's legal fraternity.

In 1903 Sister Kate of the Community of the Sisters of the Church, purchased 20 acres (81,000 m^{2}) of land at Parkerville for the "League of Charity Home" for children, which became the Parkerville Children's Home.

The historic Parkerville Children's Home bush cemetery is located approximately three kilometres east of the Home. Clutterbuck Creek is named after Sister Kate's parents. In 1909 the construction of the chapel was completed. Sally Morgan, in her landmark novel My Place, writes how three-year-old Gladys is taken to this orphanage.

In 1966 the railway line was closed as part of a change of route to the Avon Valley. The railway route has become the Railway Reserve Heritage Trail as a bridle and walking path.

The Parkerville Amphitheatre was owned and operated by John Joseph Jones. This and other nearby locations have been used for filming children's television series, Parallax. A documentary about John Joseph Jones and the Parkerville Amphitheatre was released at the Revelation Film Festival in Perth in 2015, directed by Susie Conte and Jenny Crabb, "Parkerville Amphitheatre: Sets, Bugs and Rock 'n Roll". It can be found on vimeo - https://vimeo.com/122621542

By the early 2000s, Perth's suburban growth was placing development pressures on Parkerville.

In January 2014 houses in Parkerville and neighbouring suburbs were destroyed in a bushfire.

== Education ==
There are three schools in Parkerville today: Parkerville Primary School, the Silver Tree Steiner School and Mundaring Christian College.

== Transport ==
=== Bus ===
- 320 Midland Station to Mundaring – serves Great Eastern Highway
- 328 Midland Station to Chidlow – serves Great Eastern Highway, Seaborne Street, Byfield Road and Richardson Road
