= Gorrie, Western Australia =

Suburb within Shire of Mundaring in Perth, Western Australia

Gorrie
- Suburb
- Interactive map of Gorrie
- Coordinates: 31.909°S 116.313°E
- Country: Australia
- State: Western Australia
- City: Perth
- LGA: Shire of Mundaring
- Location: 43 km (27 mi) E of Perth CBD
- Established: 1997

Area
  - Total: 28.9 km^{2} (11.2 sq mi)

Population
  - Total: 0
  - Density: 0.000/km^{2} (0.00/sq mi)
- Postcode: 6556

Gorrie is a suburb of Shire of Mundaring, Perth, Western Australia.

It was created in 1997 in an area to the east of Sawyers Valley in the Shire of Mundaring. The name was obtained from nearby Mt Gorrie, which was named after the family that settled in the area at the beginning of the twentieth century.

Mt Gorrie contains a 16 km (10 mi) walking trail called Mount Gorrie Walk.
