= Mundaring, Western Australia =

Suburb of Perth, Western Australia

Mundaring
- Suburb
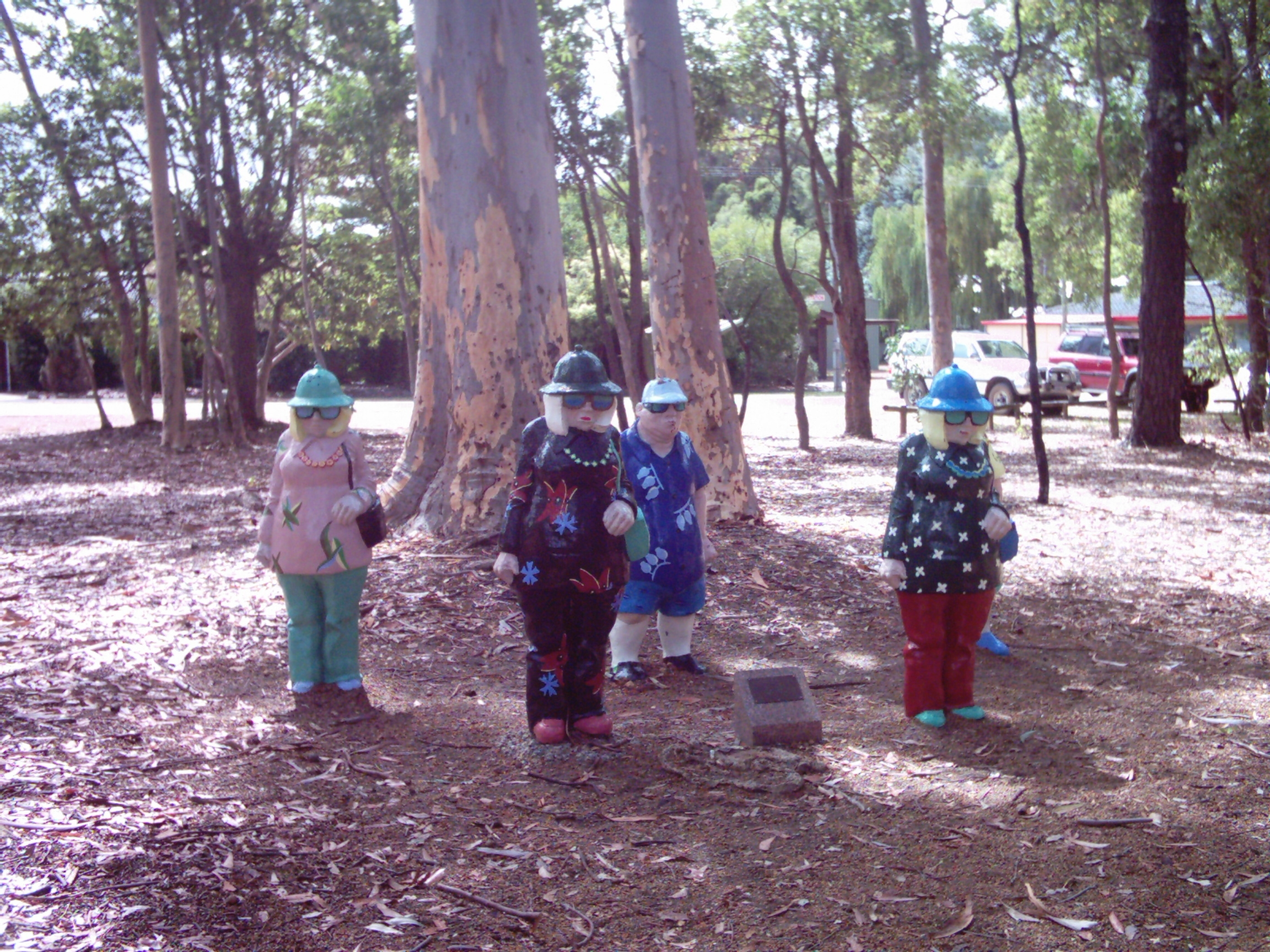
- Statues in Sculpture Park, Mundaring
- Interactive map of Mundaring
- Coordinates: 31.897°S 116.171°E
- Country: Australia
- State: Western Australia
- City: Perth
- LGA: Shire of Mundaring
- Established: 1890s

Government
  - State electorate: Kalamunda
  - Federal division: Bullwinkel

Population
  - Total: 3,190 (SAL 2021)
- Postcode: 6073
Suburbs around Mundaring
Parkerville	Stoneville	Mount Helena
Mahogany Creek	Mundaring	Sawyers Valley
Paulls Valley	Paulls Valley	Mundaring Weir

Mundaring (pron: mun-DAIR-ing) is a suburb located 34 km east of Perth, Western Australia on the Great Eastern Highway. The suburb is located within the Shire of Mundaring.

The Aboriginal name of the area "Mindah-lung", said to mean "a high place on a high place", was anglicised to become "Mundaring".

The Mundaring area is considered to be part of the Perth Hills area.

== Newspapers ==
The Mundaring region is currently well served by weekly and monthly newspapers:

- Chidlow Chatter
- Darlington Review – locality specific
- Echo Newspapers – weekly – Midland based

Former newspapers in the area included:

- The Darling
- Swan Express – although Midland based, had considerable space to "Hills" stories
  - It is also extracted in entries in the J S Battye Library catalogue with items about the Hills.
- Hills Gazette (Community Newspaper Group) – weekly
- Mundaring magazine – monthly

== Railway ==
The only railway line current in the Mundaring Shire – is the third route of the Eastern Railway which passes through Bellevue and Swan View. The railway routes mentioned below – first route and second route are no longer operational – and constitute sections of the Railway Reserve Heritage Trail.

The Eastern Railway passed through Mundaring on its first route through to Chidlow. Mundaring railway station, and the branch railway leading from it – the Mundaring Weir branch railway were significant locations for the construction of the Mundaring Weir. Following the construction of the second route of the Eastern Railway, the Mundaring line served as an alternative to the second route at the time of accidents and derailments, until its closing to traffic in 1954.

The line through Mundaring was known as the Mundaring loop to railway administration in its later years of operation, while in earlier years it was known as Smiths Mill branch (the earlier name for Glen Forrest). The line served a small population but played an integral part in the development and history of Mundaring.

The Mundaring Hotel opened opposite the Mundaring railway station in 1899 and served patrons on the route.

== Mundaring Geophysical Observatory ==
Mundaring was the location of a Bureau of Mineral Resources Geophysical Observatory from 1959 to April 2000.

The annual reports from the Observatory constituted the seismic record of the state of Western Australia for that period of time as well as reports and summaries of activity.

== Environment ==
The town lies within the Mundaring-Kalamunda Important Bird Area, so identified by BirdLife International because of its importance as a non-breeding season roost site and foraging base for the long-billed black cockatoos.

== Transport ==
=== Bus ===
- 320 Mundaring to Midland Station – serves Craig Street, Mundaring Weir Road and Great Eastern Highway
- 331 Mundaring to Wundowie – serves Craig Street, Mundaring Weir Road and Stoneville Road
