= Perth Hills =

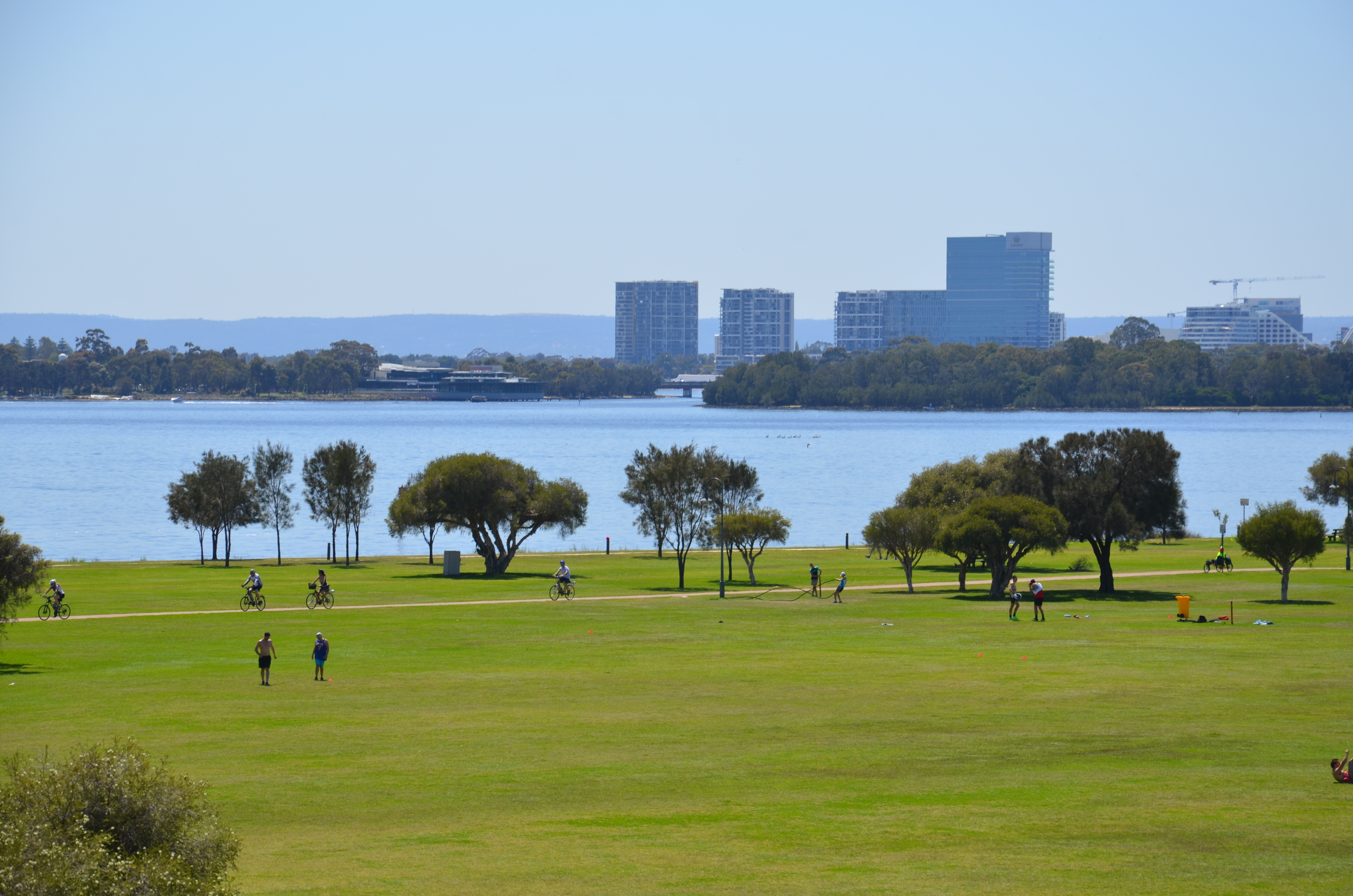
- Perth Hills in context with Perth - the blue line on the horizon is the Darling Scarp which defines the western side of the Perth Hills area
- Country: Australia
- State: Western Australia
- LGAs: Shire of Mundaring; City of Kalamunda; City of Swan

Perth Hills is a term used primarily for marketing purposes to identify the part of the Darling Scarp and hinterland east of the scarp that lies within the Shire of Mundaring, City of Swan, and the City of Kalamunda and as part of the constituent bodies belonging to the Eastern Metropolitan Regional Council of Perth, Western Australia.

The term is most commonly found on tourist maps, and on the government Department of Environment and Conservation pamphlets and materials relating to the regional headquarters at Mundaring Weir – The Perth Hills National Parks Centre (formerly known as the Hills Forest Discovery Centre) and its "Nearer to Nature" programs and activities. It is also sometimes used in books and pamphlets.

In earlier usage of the term "The Hills" by people living in Perth, the identification of specific locations along the Darling Scarp (also called the Darling Range) found some places more commonly referred to than others.

Both Kalamunda and Darlington, as separate and specific areas, were frequently referred to specifically as "The Hills", due to their presence on the edge of the scarp.

Greenmount Hill is often considered the "entrance point to the Hills", because the main road – the Great Eastern Highway – passes through this location, adjacent to the route of the much earlier road, the York Road.

The "Swan Hills" is a name often given to a part of the range centred on Toodyay Road and its corridor through the north-eastern part of the City of Swan and Gidgegannup. However, the term "Swan Hills" is also used in other ways as well.

A "Welcome to Perth Hills" sign within 100 metres of Chippers Leap on Greenmount Hill is the entry point for that part of the hills in the Mundaring shire.

Another "Welcome to Perth Hills" sign is on Kalamunda Road, before the road climbs to Kalamunda. The area also includes the Bickley and Carmel Wine region.

The hills above Armadale and localities are quite separate from the other hills localities.

== Wine region ==
Perth Hills is also a wine region, with some 35 wineries. The climate of warmer days and cooler nights makes it a very different region to the neighbouring Swan Valley. Larger wineries in the region combine vineyards with popular restaurants.

The Australian Geographical Indication "Perth Hills" was entered in the Register of Protected Names on 25 March 1999.

== Bushfires ==
Bushfires in the area are often cited in news media as fires in the Perth Hills.

The serious bushfire in 2014 was frequently referred to as the Perth Hills bushfire, rather than the Parkerville bushfire, in reports and media.

A fire in February 2021 - the 2021 Wooroloo bushfires was reported as a fire in the Perth Hills.
