= Stoneville, Western Australia =

Stoneville
- Suburb
- Interactive map of Stoneville
- Coordinates: 31.878°S 116.169°E
- Country: Australia
- State: Western Australia
- City: Perth
- LGA: Shire of Mundaring

Government
  - State electorate: Kalamunda
  - Federal division: Bullwinkel

Population
  - Total: 2,489 (SAL 2021)
- Postcode: 6081
Suburbs around Stoneville
	Gidgegannup
Parkerville	Stoneville	Mount Helena
Mundaring	Mundaring	Sawyers Valley

Stoneville is a suburb east of Perth in the Shire of Mundaring, Western Australia. It is named after Edward Albert Stone, who was Chief Justice of Western Australia when the place was named in 1905. The name was chosen by the local residents, who were developing the district for fruit growing. The town's population is 2,050, with a median age of 36 years and 7.1% of residents aged over 65.

In a bushfire in January 2014 a considerable number of houses were destroyed.

In 2019 local residents resorted to activism in a bid to stop a proposal by Satterley for the North Stoneville Structure Plan 34 development in favour of more sustainable housing. External studies showed that existing road infrastructure could only cater for approximately 70 more dwellings and Main Roads Western Australia confirmed there were no upgrades planned for the area intersecting Great Eastern Highway. A special councillors' meeting was held in August 2019, at which the Mundaring Shire unanimously rejected the proposal. In July 2020 the structure plan was refused by the Western Australian Planning Commission. In September 2026 the planning commission's decision was upheld by the State Administrative Tribunal.

== Transport ==
=== Bus ===
- 328 Midland station to Chidlow – serves Richardson Road, Ayres Road, Hawke Street, Bentley Street, Stoneville Road, Traylen Road, Kevin Street and Osborne Street
- 331 Mundaring to Wundowie – serves Stoneville Road, Richardson Road, Ayres Road, Hawke Street, Bentley Street, Traylen Road, Kevin Street and Osborne Street
