= Mount Helena, Western Australia =

Mount Helena
- Suburb
- Interactive map of Mount Helena
- Coordinates: 31.875°S 116.208°E
- Country: Australia
- State: Western Australia
- City: Perth
- LGA: Shire of Mundaring

Government
  - State electorate: Kalamunda
  - Federal division: Bullwinkel

Population
  - Total: 3,373 (SAL 2021)
- Postcode: 6082
Suburbs around Mount Helena
Gidgegannup	Gidgegannup	Gidgegannup
Stoneville	Mount Helena	Chidlow
Mundaring	Sawyers Valley	Sawyers Valley

Mount Helena is a suburb on the outskirts of Perth, in Western Australia, 35 km from the city, in the Shire of Mundaring. Its population in 2016 was 3,185 people.

== History ==
Mount Helena was originally known as White's Mill, a reference to Abraham White who, with Edward Vivien Harvey Keane and James Wright, in 1882 built a saw mill to supply sleepers for the construction of the Eastern Railway from Guildford to Chidlows Well. From 1898 the area was known as Lion Mill until it was renamed Mount Helena in 1924. The chief instigator in the hunt for a new name was the local Progress Association whose first choice, "Hillcrest", had been rejected by the authorities because of a duplication in New South Wales. The next suggestion, "Mount Helena", was more successful, indicative of the terrain and because the suburb was situated centrally in the Helena River district.

== Education ==
Mount Helena has two schools, Mount Helena Primary School and Eastern Hills Senior High School. They are situated next to each other on Keane Street East.

== Local activities ==
Mount Helena has several active community and sporting groups, including the Mount Helena Voluntary Bush Fire Brigade, the Mount Helena Resident and Ratepayers Association, and a badminton club at the local Eastern Hills High School.

The Railway Reserve Heritage Trail passes behind the Mount Helena Tavern on its way through the suburb.

== Local events ==
For many years the Mount Helena Whim Festival has been held in Pioneer Park biannually since 2008; in 2018 the inaugural Hills Billy Cart Festival was held down Evans Street. 2019 saw the two events combine under the Mount Helena Classic. Currently the Hills Billy Cart Festival is held annually in October by the Hills Billy Carts Inc and the Mount Helena Whim Festival is held biannually on its historic date, the last Sunday of October by the Mount Helena Residents and Ratepayers Progress Association.

== Transport ==
=== Bus ===
- 328 Chidlow to Midland Station – serves Elliott Road, Keane Street, Sawyers Road, Stretch Road and Osborne Street
- 331 Mundaring to Wundowie – serves Osborne Street, Stretch Road, Keane Street, Sawyers Road, Evans Street, Dibble Street, Princess Road, Cook Street, Chidlow Street and Elliott Road
