= Railway Reserves Heritage Trail =

Trail in Shire of Mundaring, Western Australia

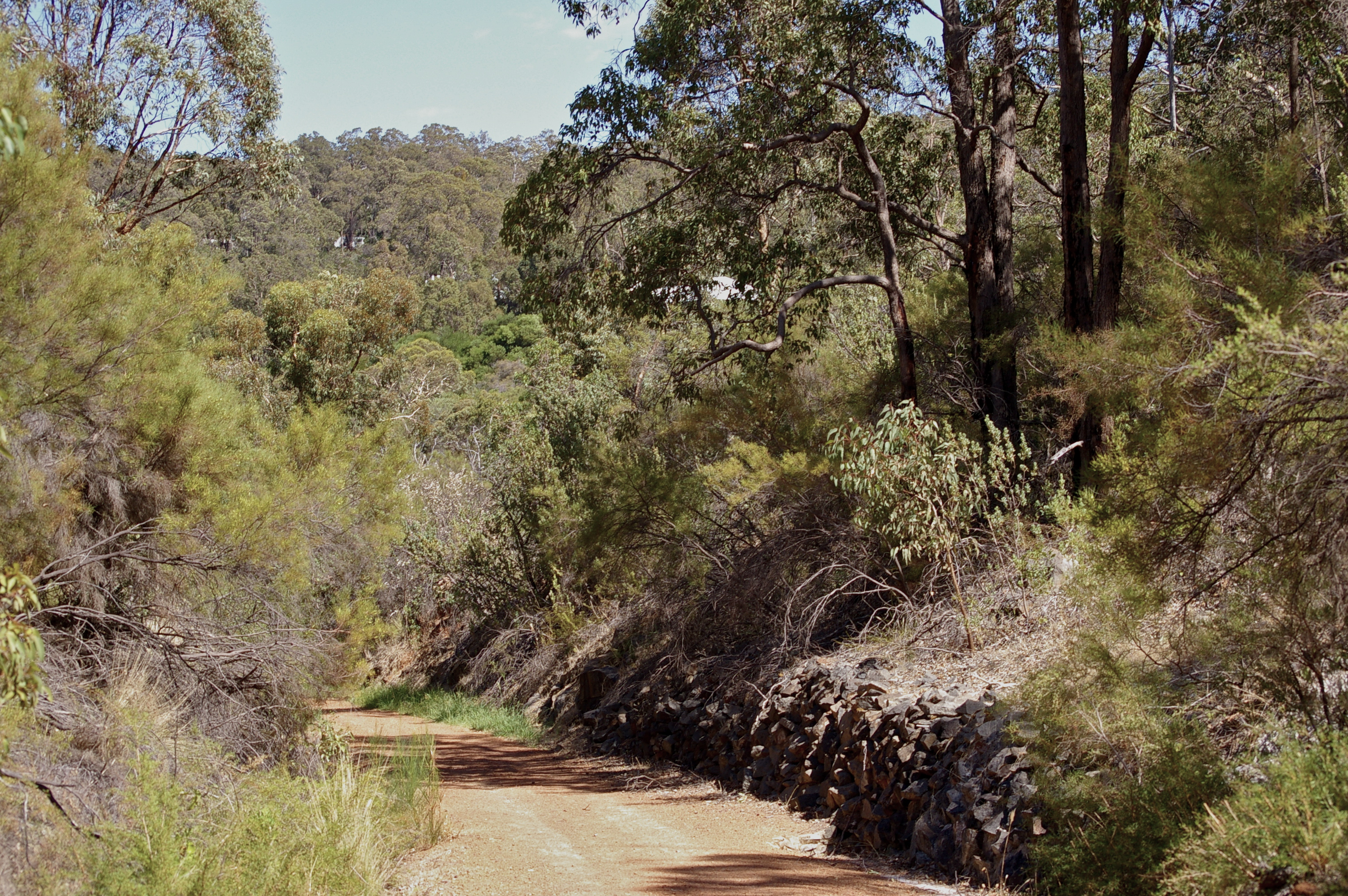
Trail near border between Glen Forrest and Darlington

The Railway Reserves Heritage Trail – also on some maps as Rail Reserve Heritage Trail or Rail Reserves Historical Trail, and frequently referred to locally as the Bridle Trail or Bridle Track – is within the Shire of Mundaring in Western Australia.

== Names and sections ==
The Railway Reserves Heritage Trail follows 59 km (37 mi) of historic Eastern Railway routes between Bellevue and Wooroloo.

The trail comprises a loop between Bellevue and Mount Helena, and a line from Mount Helena to Wooroloo.

The loop, called Trail Loop, is 40.8 km (25.4 mi) in length, and follows the two Eastern Railway routes travelling east from Bellevue and meeting up again in Mount Helena, thus forming a loop. The southern route, which traverses Mundaring, is the First Route, opened in 1884. In contrast, the northern route, which passes through John Forrest National Park, follows the Second Route, opened in 1896.

In Mount Helena the Railway Reserves Heritage Trail continues as a line 22.5 km (14.0 mi) in length, called Eastern Extension, onto Wooroloo. The line is coincident with this part of the 75-kilometre-long (47 mi) Kep Track, which continues along the old railway route as far as Northam.

In Kalamunda there is a railway heritage trail that follows the alignment of the old Upper Darling Range railway.

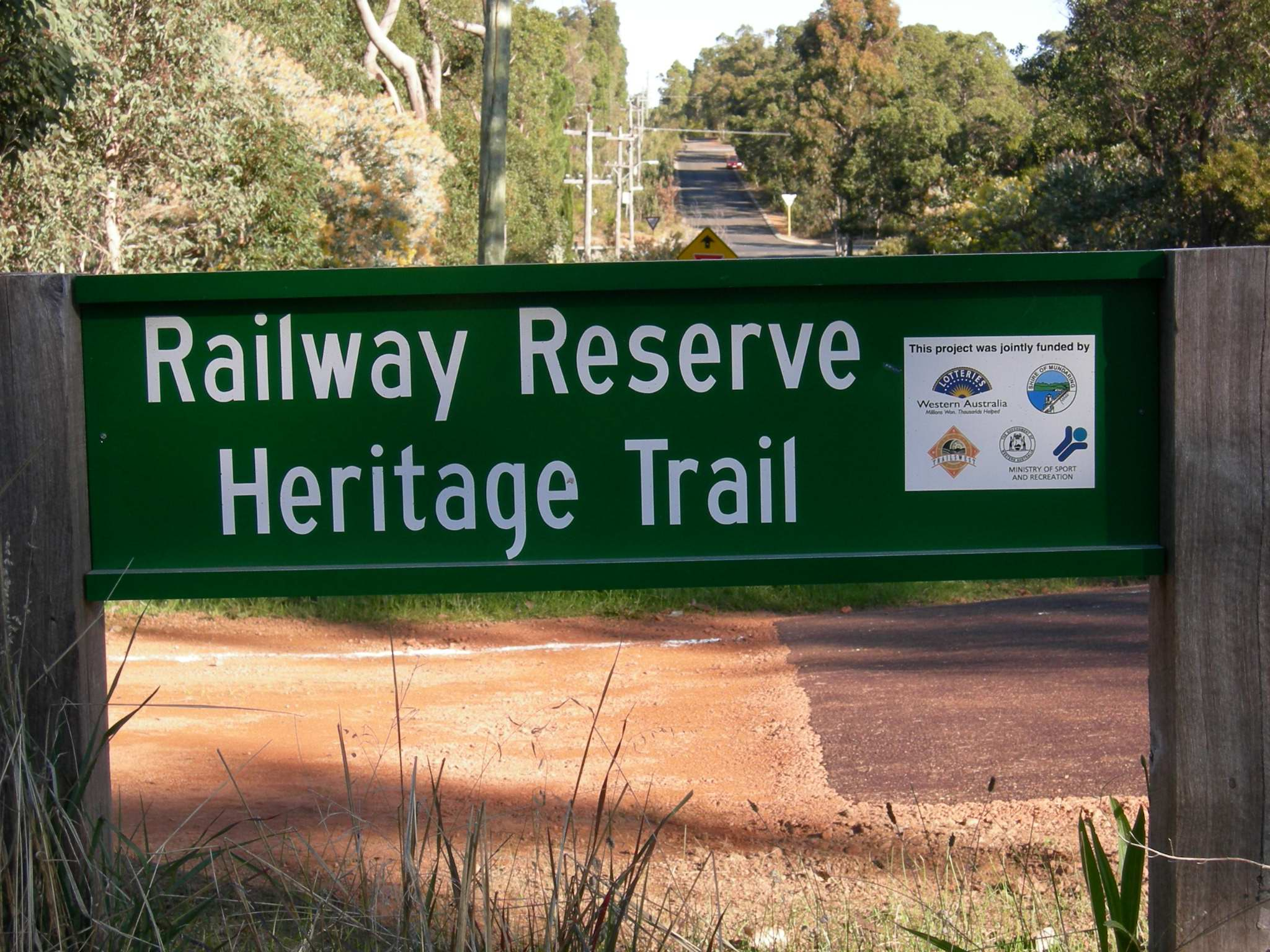
Sign identifying sponsors of upgrades to trail and facilities

== History ==
It was created following the Western Australian Government Railways (the WAGR, as it was commonly known) ceasing to operate on the Bellevue to Northam railway following the construction of the Standard Gauge Railway in 1966.

The first two attempts at the Eastern Railway from Bellevue to Chidlow, Western Australia both constructed before 1900 failed to have sufficiently low gradients for the increasing tonnages on the railway system. The Avon Valley route taken by the new Standard Gauge line, was the third and final attempt to take the railway system out of the metropolitan area across the Darling Scarp.

The first two Eastern Railway formations were closed by an Act of Parliament in the 1960s, and the lands were vested with the Mundaring Council. As a result, most of the removable property of the WAGR - was removed from the reserve. Notably the Mundaring and Darlington concrete railway platforms remain, and approximately three telegraph poles remain along the original formation. Otherwise all rails, sleepers and buildings no longer remain. The Koongamia platform, although in use for only about five years in the 1960s, was re-built as public sculpture in the 2000s.

Interesting exceptions to the removal of railway operations assets are the stationmaster's houses in Mundaring and Glen Forrest - these have been preserved and maintained. The Mundaring house is currently the location of the office of the Mundaring and Hills Historical Society.

Considerable alterations have been made to the original railway formations by telecommunication, power, road and other authorities. In parts, roads named "Railway Terrace", and other old roads running parallel to the reserve remain unchanged.

== Australian Bicentenary ==
In 1988 the Australian Bicentenary saw 17 Heritage Trails funded by the Commonwealth and Western Australian governments under the Commonwealth State Bicentennial Commemorative Program - as the W.A. Heritage Trail Network. The Railway Reserves Heritage Trail was developed by the Mundaring Bicentennial Community Committee, and a pamphlet and signage on the trail was funded by this as well. In the pamphlet and on the signage - the main stopping places as annotated, and the details go as far as Wooroloo.

== Current conditions ==
In some parts the reserve is an important wildlife corridor, while other parts have been degraded by erosion and bushfire damage. It passes through the John Forrest National Park and is one of a number of named trails in the park. Considerable funds have been given to the Mundaring shire to maintain the reserve for use by walkers, cyclists and horse riders (hence the Bridle Trail name recurring). However, despite restraints, motor cyclists and others provide a regular hazard.

== Ecology and environmental context ==
The two earlier routes of the Eastern Railway followed closely the line of two creeks – the first route followed Nyaania Creek which is part of the Helena River catchment, while the second followed Jane Brook which joins the Swan River at Middle Swan.

Sections of the reserve have important ecological features that contain examples of a range of conditions found in the region. The whole trail is in effect a vital Wildlife corridor creating connections between adjacent parks and nature reserves:

First Route or southern section

- Greenmount National Park - adjacent reserve grounds - Greenmount and Boya
- Darlington Recreation Ground - Darlington
- Binbrook Park - Darlington
- Glen Forrest Super Block - Glen Forrest
- Strettle Road Reserve - Mahogany Creek
- State Forest - Sawyers Valley

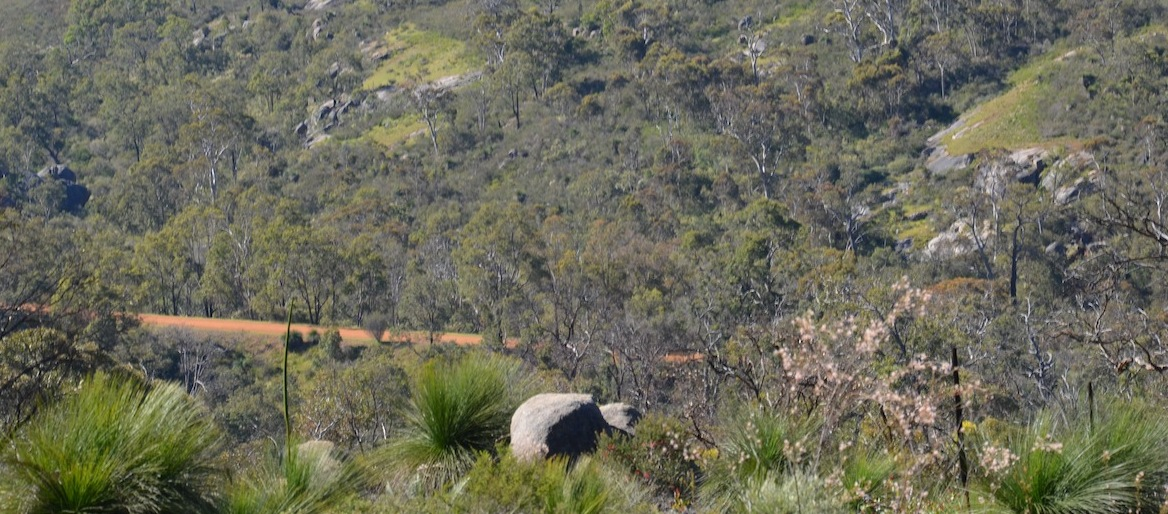
John Forrest National Park section of trail east of Swan View

Second Route or northern section

- John Forrest National Park - Swan View and Hovea
- Brookside Park - Hovea
- Milligan Park - Stoneville
- Leschenaultia Conservation Reserve - Chidlow
- Beechina Nature Reserve - Beechina
- Beechina North Nature Reserve - Beechina
- Needham Nature Reserve - Wooroloo

It also has named parks and reserves either within or linked in the legal bounds of the land designated as the trail:

- Whybourne Park - Bellevue
- Darlington Station Reserve - Darlington
- M.J. Morgan Reserve - Glen Forrest
- Thomas Park - Glen Forrest
- Sculpture Park - Mundaring
- Jarrah Creek Reserve -Sawyers Valley
- Chidlow Recreation Reserve - Chidlow

== Trek the Trail ==
Trek the Trail is a free walking and cycling event that takes place every September along a section of Railway Reserves Heritage Trail. This annual event, jointly run by the Shire of Mundaring, Mundaring Arts Centre, Mundaring Tourism Association and Mundaring and Hills Historical Society, encourages participants to enjoy art, entertainment, local history, activities and the physical challenge along the Trail.

The event was conducted from Wooroloo to Chidlow in 2004, Mount Helena to Parkerville in 2005, Mundaring to Darlington in 2006, Chidlow to Sawyers Valley in 2007, Mundaring to Mundaring Weir in 2008, Mundaring to Darlington in 2009 and Parkerville to Swan View in 2010.

== Distances ==
- Pechey Road, Swan View 00.0 km 40.8 km
- Swan View Tunnel eastern entrance 1.2 km 39.6 km
- Parkerville 8.9 km 31.9 km
- Stoneville 11.9 km 28.9 km
- Mount Helena 15.9 km 24.9 km
- Sawyers Valley 19.0 km 21.8 km
- Mundaring 22.6 km 18.2 km
- Coppin Road, Mundaring 24.1 km 16.7 km
- Bailey Road, Glen Forrest 27.8 km 15.2 km
- Hardey Road, Glen Forrest 29.0 km 11.8 km
- Darlington 31.7 km 9.1 km
- Boya 34.0 km 6.8 km
- Scott Road, Greenmount 35.7 km 5.1 km
- RSL Hall, Bellevue 35.7 km 3.3 km

Most road crossings on the trail have signs showing distances to the next number of locations or road crossings.

== Cycling ==
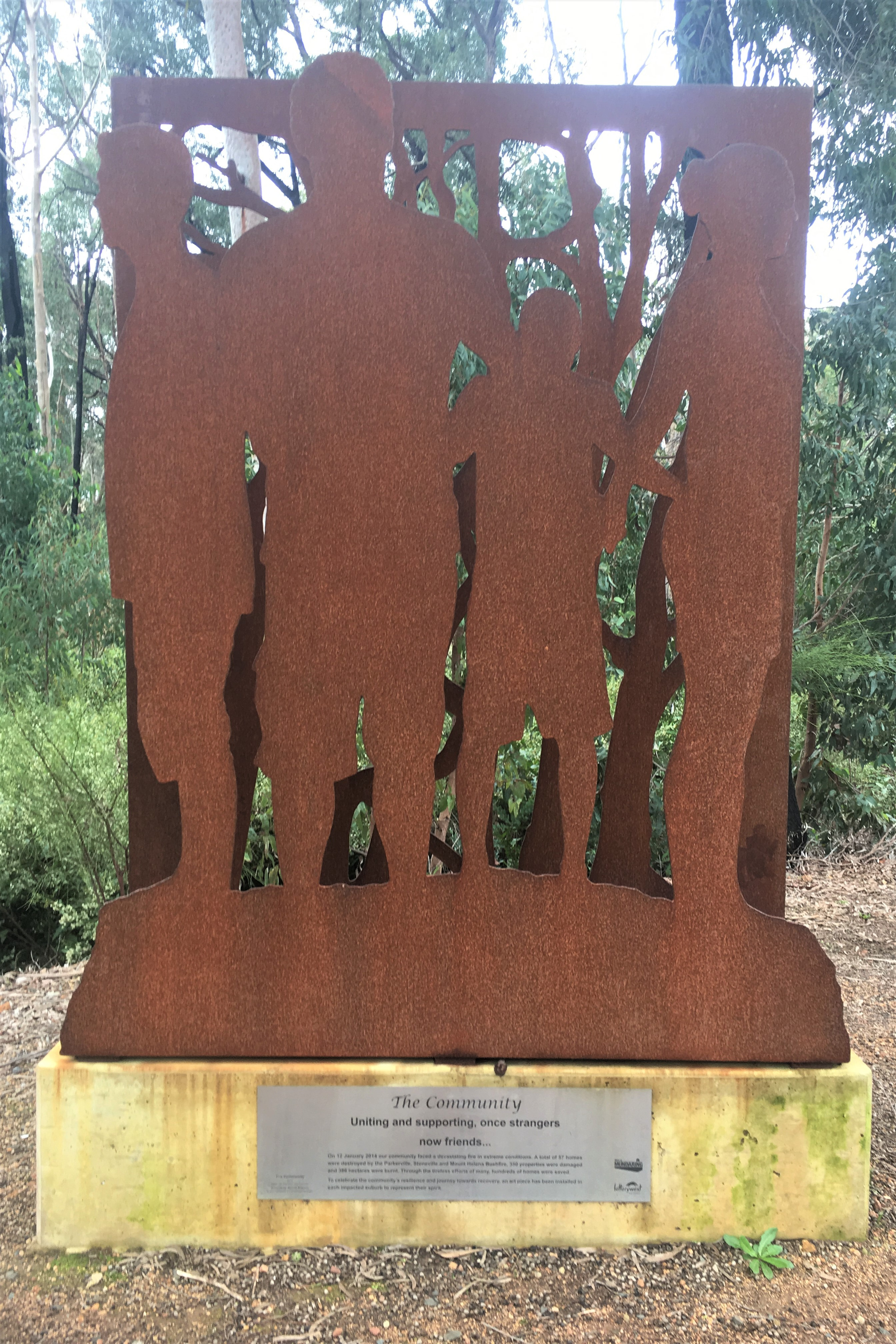
The Community, art piece on the Railway Reserves Heritage Trail, Stoneville

As the trail is a shared trail – cyclists, horse riders and pedestrians share the trail – one route suggested by the Department for Planning and Infrastructure utilises part of the trail.

== Information ==
An older pamphlet produced in conjunction between Trailwest, Bikewest, WAMBA, Mundaring Shire, DEC, and Lotteries West - Bikewest Mountain Bike Maps - Railway Reserve Trail - Midland-Mt Helena-Midland recommends a starting point of the Morrison Road-Pechey Road intersection in Swan View. It has a map, terrain profile, and a brief history of the two sections/routes.

A newer pamphlet produced by the Mundaring Shire Railway Reserves Heritage Trail is linked with the new website.

== See also ==
- List of rail trails
