= Shire of Mundaring =

Local government area in Perth, Western Australia

Coordinates: 31°53′49″S 116°10′16″E

- Local government area
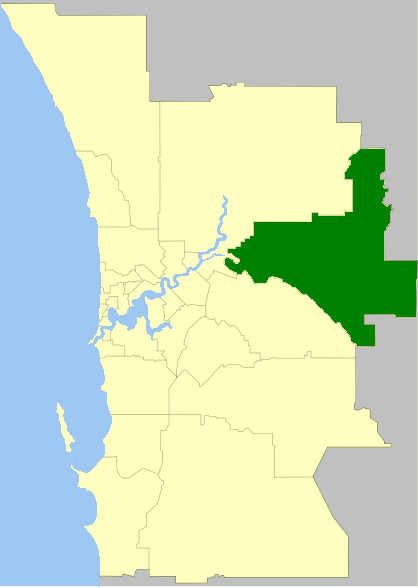
- The Shire of Mundaring within the Perth Metropolitan Area

- Interactive map of Shire of Mundaring
- Country: Australia
- State: Western Australia
- Region: Eastern Metropolitan Perth Darling Scarp
- Established: 1903
- Council seat: Mundaring

Government
  - Shire President: Paige McNeil
  - State electorate: Darling Range, Kalamunda, Midland, Swan Hills
  - Federal division: Hasluck, Bullwinkel

Area
  - Total: 644.9 km^{2} (249.0 sq mi)

Population
  - Total: 39,166 (LGA 2021)
- Website: Shire of Mundaring
LGAs around Shire of Mundaring
Swan	Swan	Northam
Swan	Shire of Mundaring	York
Kalamunda	Kalamunda	York

The Shire of Mundaring is a local government area in eastern metropolitan Perth, the capital of Western Australia. The Shire covers an area of 645 square kilometres (249 sq mi) and had a population of approximately 38,000 as at the 2016 Census.

== History ==
The Greenmount Road District was created on 17 April 1903. On 29 March 1934, it was renamed the Mundaring Road District. On 1 July 1961, it became the Shire of Mundaring following the passage of the Local Government Act 1960, which reformed all remaining road districts into shires.

== Statistics ==
Mundaring Shire has published the following statistics for the period 1994-2006:

- Population: 35,097
- Area: 643.32 km^{2}
- Rateable area: 205.91 km^{2}
- Rateable properties: 15,251
- Revenue: A$50.1M
- Vested reserves: 104.60 km^{2}
- Forests and National Parks: 238.30 km^{2}

== Wards ==
The shire is divided into four wards.

- West Ward - three councillors
- South Ward - three councillors
- Central Ward - three councillors
- East Ward - three councillors

== National Parks ==
The Shire contains three national parks and numerous nature reserves:

- Beelu National Park
- Greenmount National Park
- John Forrest National Park
- Lake Leschenaultia
- Mundaring Weir and Interpretation Precinct

== Trails ==
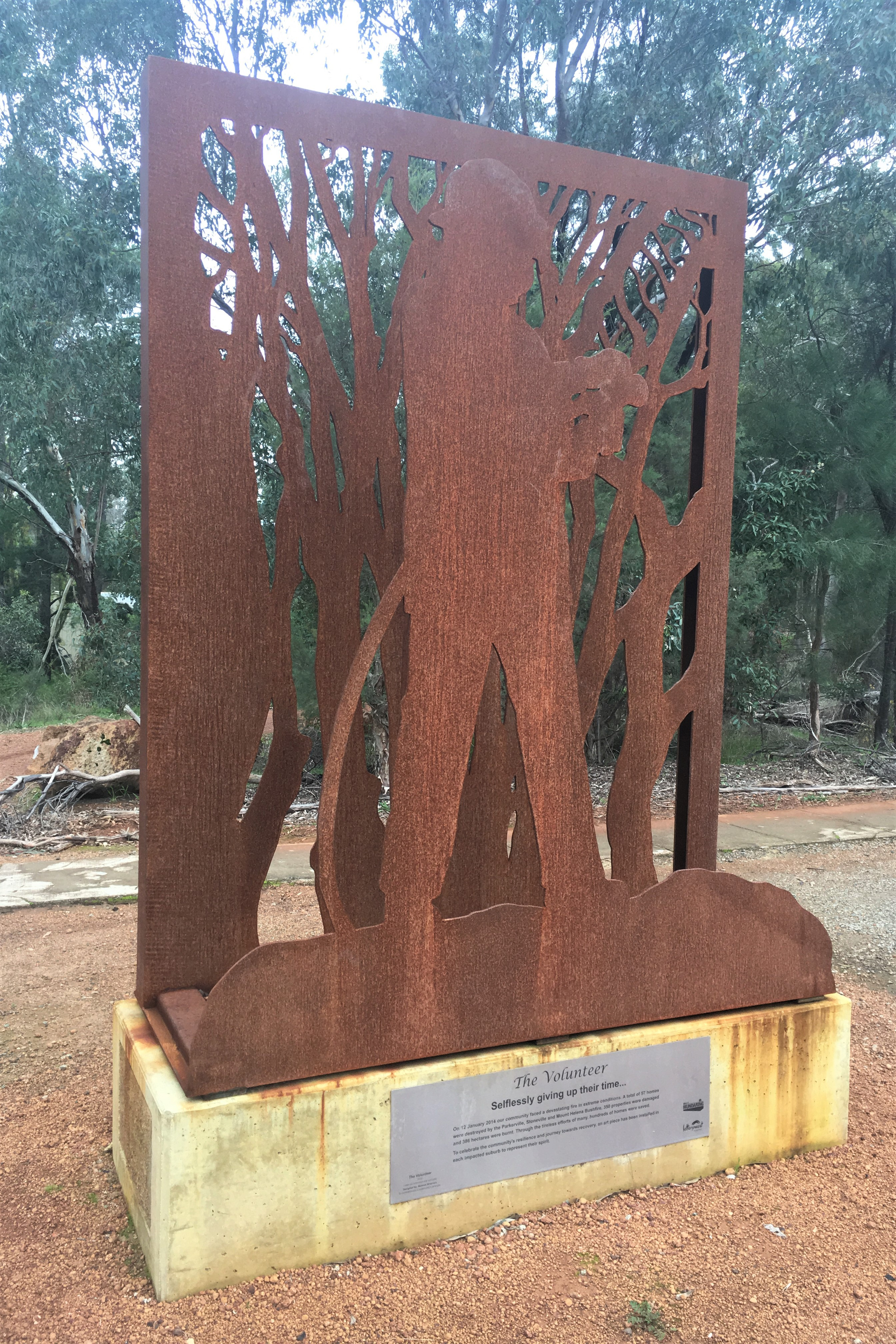
The Volunteer, art piece on the Railway Reserves Heritage Trail, Parkerville

The Shire is recognised for its natural environment and has numerous walk and ride trails:

- Bibbulmun Track
- C Y O'Connor Trail
- Eagle View Walk Trail
- Forsyths Mill Mountain Bike Track
- Kep Track
- Lake Leschenaultia Trails
- Munda Biddi Trail
- Railway Reserves Heritage Trail
- Weir View Walk

== Suburbs and localities ==
The suburbs and localities of the Shire of Mundaring with population and size figures based on the most recent Australian census:

Suburb	Population	Area	Map
Bailup	54 (SAL 2021)	47 km^{2} (18 sq mi)	
Beechina	128 (SAL 2021)	6.8 km^{2} (2.6 sq mi)	
Bellevue	1,514 (SAL 2021)	3 km^{2} (1.2 sq mi)	
Boya	669 (SAL 2021)	1.9 km^{2} (0.73 sq mi)	
Chidlow	1,821 (SAL 2021)	44.8 km^{2} (17.3 sq mi)	
Darlington	3,725 (SAL 2021)	12.2 km^{2} (4.7 sq mi)	
Glen Forrest	2,789 (SAL 2021)	13.2 km^{2} (5.1 sq mi)	
Greenmount	2,666 (SAL 2021)	4.8 km^{2} (1.9 sq mi)	
Gorrie	0 (SAL 2016)	26.3 km^{2} (10.2 sq mi)	
Helena Valley	4,130 (SAL 2021)	6.3 km^{2} (2.4 sq mi)	
Hovea	713 (SAL 2021)	31.6 km^{2} (12.2 sq mi)	
Mahogany Creek	829 (SAL 2021)	6.1 km^{2} (2.4 sq mi)	
Midvale	2,283 (SAL 2021)	2.9 km^{2} (1.1 sq mi)	
Mount Helena	3,373 (SAL 2021)	28.7 km^{2} (11.1 sq mi)	
Mundaring	3,190 (SAL 2021)	31.7 km^{2} (12.2 sq mi)	
Parkerville	2,432 (SAL 2021)	19 km^{2} (7.3 sq mi)	
Sawyers Valley	1,001 (SAL 2021)	170.2 km^{2} (65.7 sq mi)	
Stoneville	2,489 (SAL 2021)	18.2 km^{2} (7.0 sq mi)	
Swan View	7,889 (SAL 2021)	7.5 km^{2} (2.9 sq mi)	
The Lakes	20 (SAL 2021)	31 km^{2} (12 sq mi)	
Wooroloo	2,613 (SAL 2021)	47.5 km^{2} (18.3 sq mi)	

== Population ==
Historical population

Year	Pop.	±% p.a.
1911	2,716	—
1921	3,296	+1.95%
1933	4,975	+3.49%
1947	6,072	+1.43%
1954	7,619	+3.30%
1961	8,104	+0.89%
1966	8,925	+1.95%
1971	12,018	+6.13%
1976	16,867	+7.01%

Year	Pop.	±% p.a.
1981	20,786	+4.27%
1986	24,415	+3.27%
1991	29,184	+3.63%
1996	31,462	+1.51%
2001	33,281	+1.13%
2006	35,095	+1.07%
2011	36,529	+0.80%
2016	38,157	+0.88%
2021	39,166	+0.52%

== Heritage-listed places ==
As of 2024, 144 places are heritage-listed in the Shire of Mundaring, of which 26 are on the State Register of Heritage Places, among them John Forrest National Park, Lake Leschenaultia and the Swan View Tunnel.

== See also ==
- 2014 Perth Hills bushfire
- 2021 Wooroloo bushfire
