= York Road, Western Australia =

Historic road in Western Australia

Coordinates: 31°53′58″S 116°03′45″E

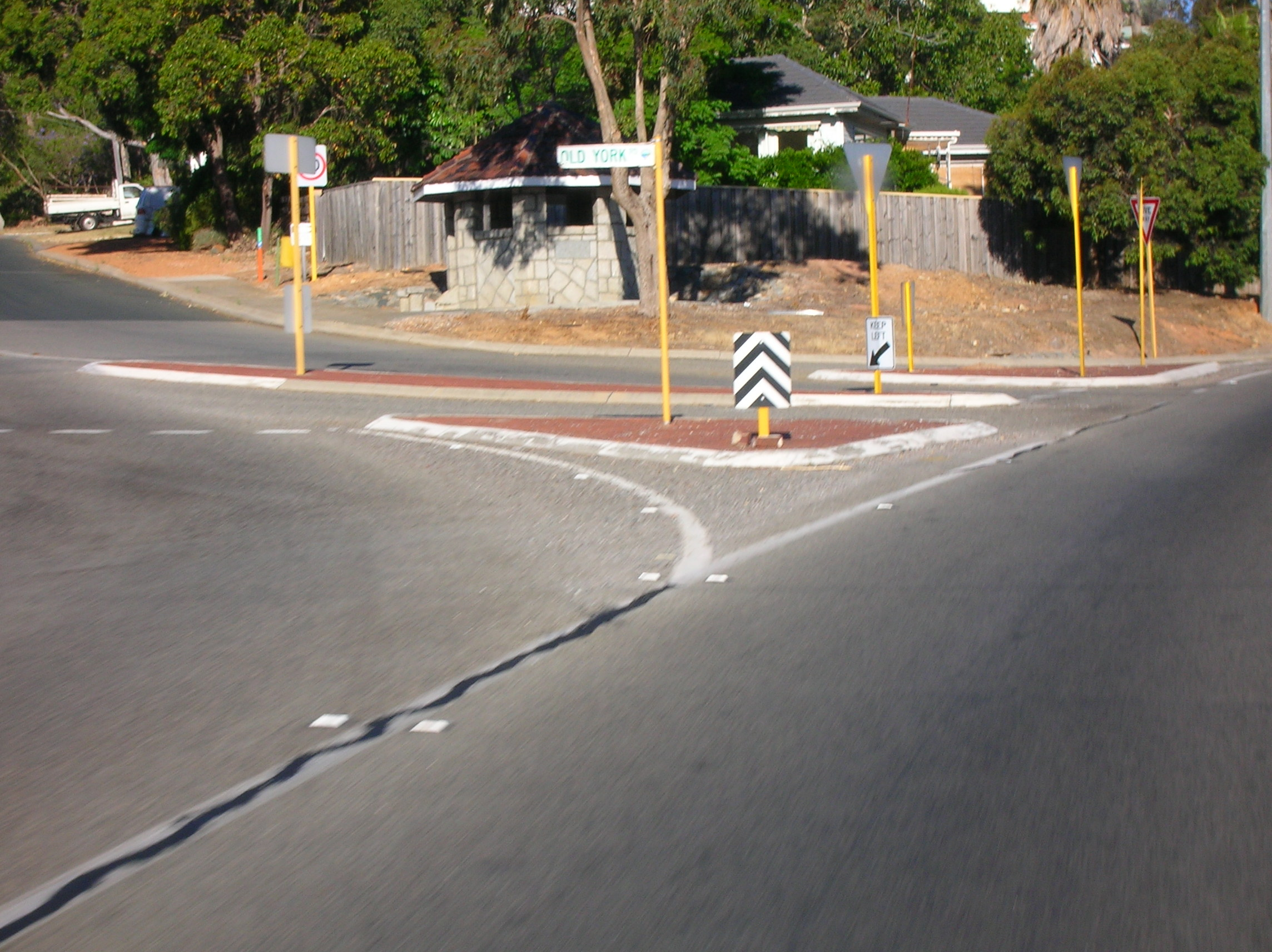
Greenmount junction of Old York Road and Great Eastern Highway

York Road, currently known in parts as the Old York Road, was the main road connecting Guildford and York, in Western Australia, during the 19th and 20th centuries.

Its origins in a talk in 1929 claim an earlier name King Dick Road, and the first settlers usage of the route being on 6 September 1831.

It became, in the 20th century, portions of the Great Eastern Highway, and the portion of the road traversing the Darling Scarp at Greenmount was named the Old York Road. The re-aligned Great Eastern Highway removed some of the problems of the steep grades along the old alignment.

The road name was also a truncation of the usage of the name Old York-Perth Road. The York Road had convict era sites along its traverse. In the metropolitan area, Chippers Leap, Bilgoman Well, Mahogany Inn (still operating), and other sites have connections with that era, and the remaining original section on Greenmount Hill is still named Old York Road.
