= Chippers Leap =

Granite outcrop on Greenmount Hill, Western Australia

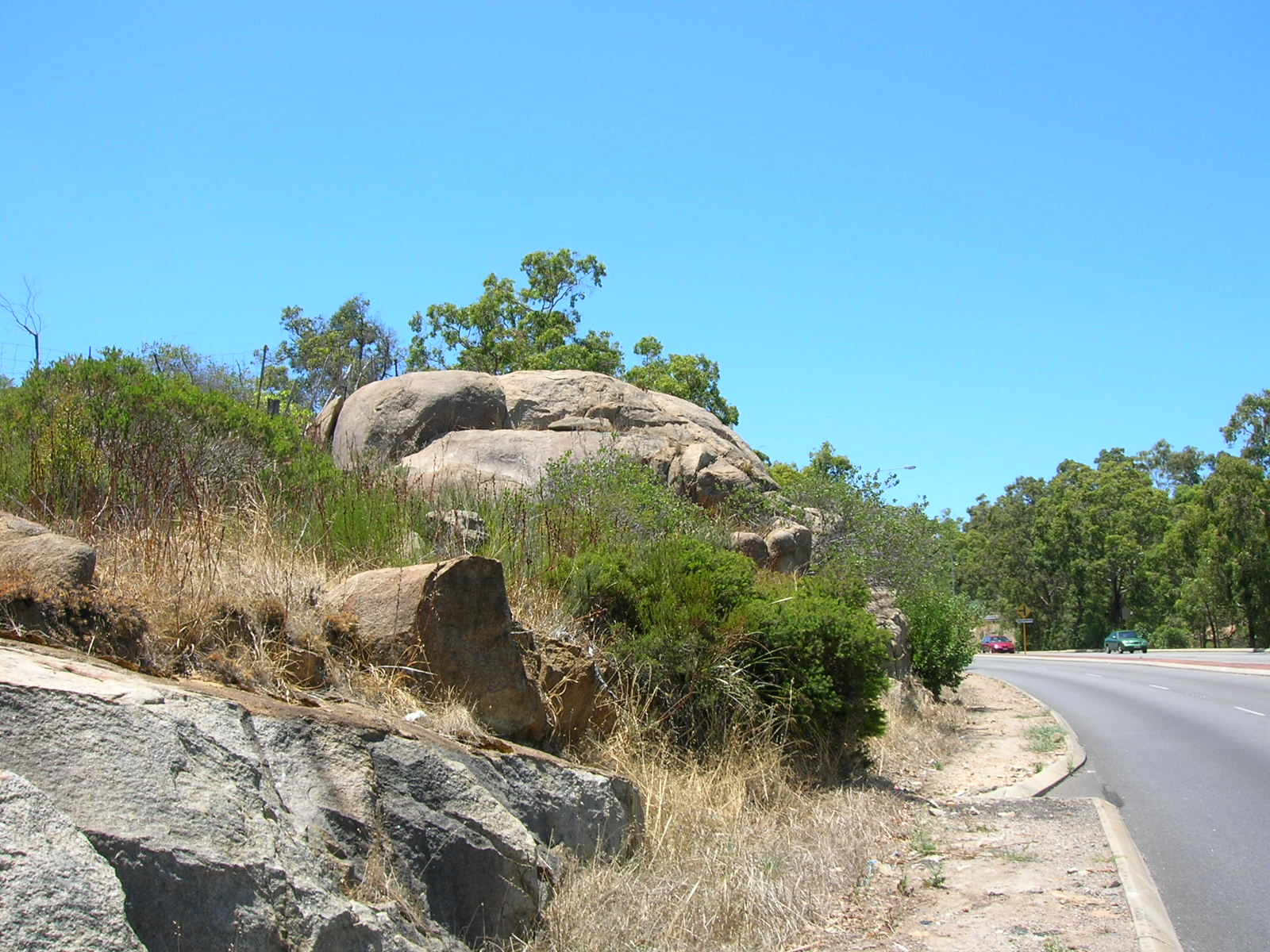
Approach to Chippers Leap in 2006

Chippers Leap, formerly known as Chipper's Leap, is a granite outcrop on Greenmount Hill in Perth, Western Australia. It is located at 31°54′00″S 116°04′09″E, on the northern side of Great Eastern Highway, near the border between the suburbs of Swan View and Greenmount.

== History ==
Chippers Leap is named for John Chipper, who jumped from the rock on 3 February 1832 while trying to escape an attack by a party of Noongars. Chipper and an 11-year-old boy named Reuben Beacham had been driving Mr Leroux's cart from Guildford to his property in York via the York Road (now Old York Road) when they were attacked by Noongars. Chipper was speared once in the side before turning around to escape. A second spear pierced his shoulder as he jumped from the rock in order to save himself. Chipper ran for approximately 6.4 kilometres (4 mi) before eventually reaching Governor James Stirling's house at Woodbridge.

In the early 1930s the Main Roads Board planned a realignment of the York Road that ultimately resulted in the construction of the present Great Eastern Highway. The original plans had the road passing through Chippers Leap. After representations by the Western Australian Historical Society, the plans were changed to allow the road to pass close by the rock, thus not only preserving the rock but also increasing its visual effect and exposure. The road itself was not constructed until the 1960s.

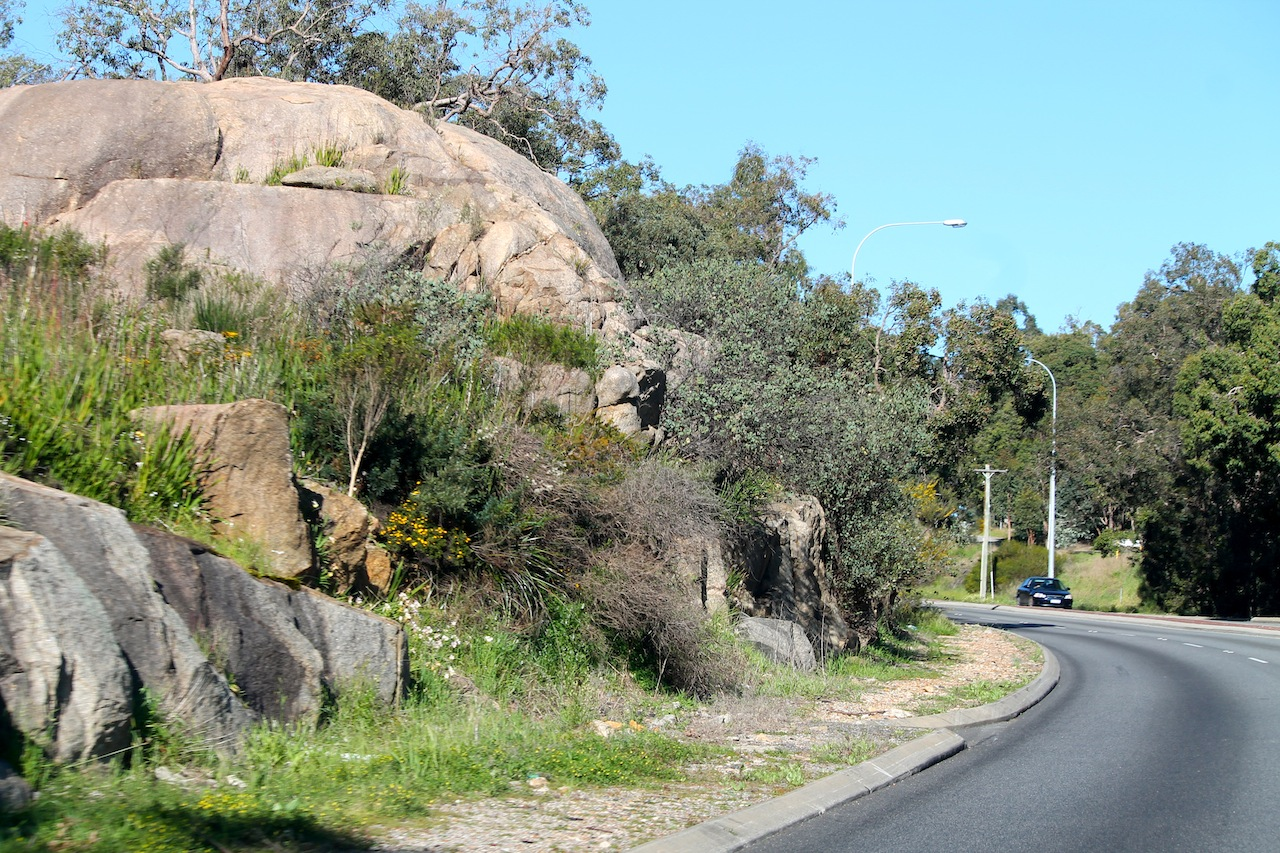
Chippers leap in 2012

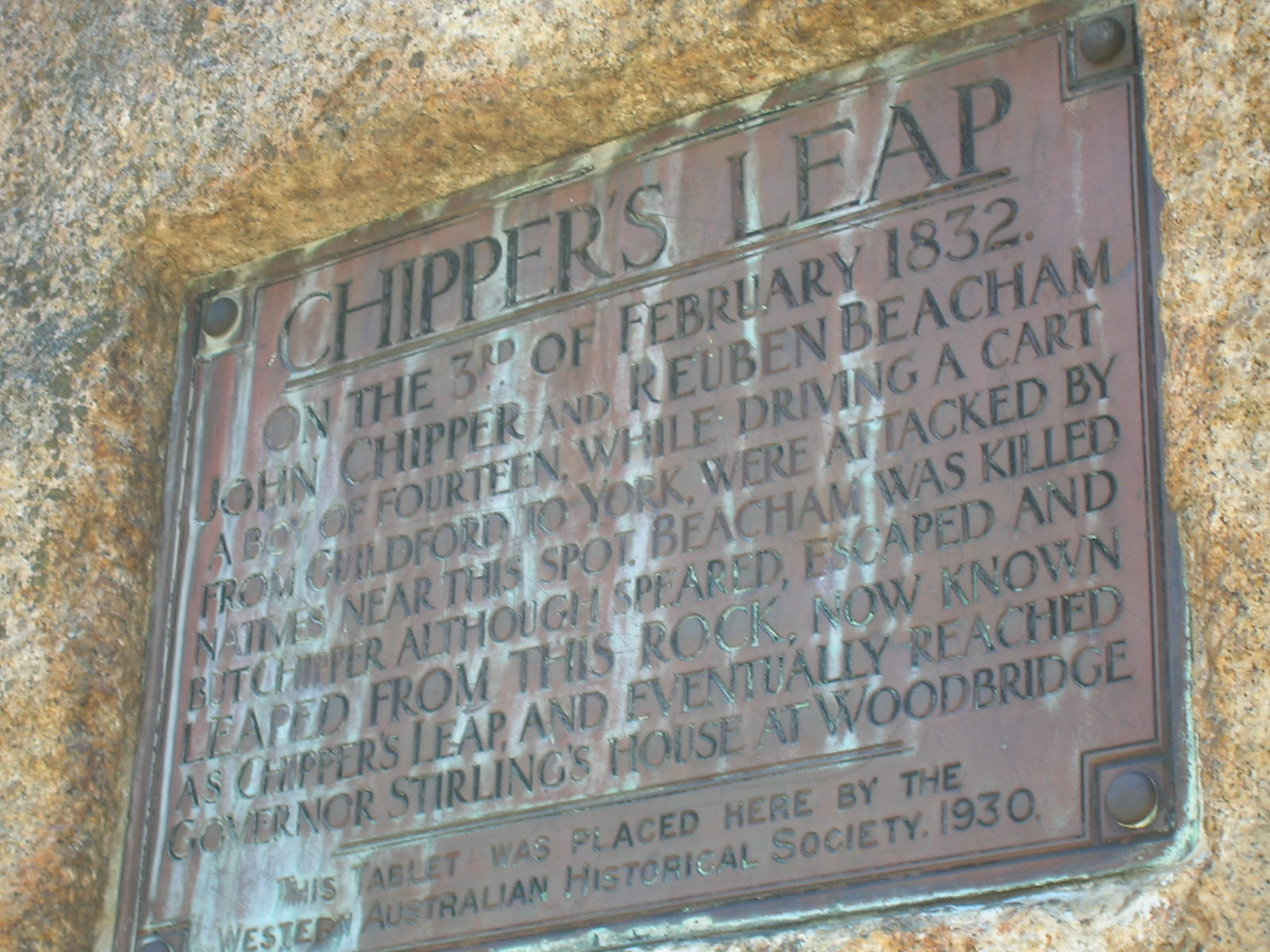
The plaque at Chippers Leap

At 8:30 pm on 3 February 1932, the centenary of Chipper's leap, the Western Australian Historical Society dedicated a plaque in memory of the event. Around 200 people attended a dedication ceremony at the rock. The plaque reads: (Note: Reuben Beacham was not 14 years of age. Reuben was born in Barnham Sussex and baptised on 20 September 1820, making him 11 and a half years old.)

On the 3rd of February 1832. John Chipper and Reuben Beacham a boy of fourteen, while driving a cart from Guildford to York, were attacked by natives near this spot. Beacham was killed but Chipper although speared, escaped and leaped from this rock, now known as Chipper's Leap, and eventually reached Governor Stirling's house at Woodbridge

For most of the 1960s through to the 1980s the rock face just west of the plaque featured an item of graffiti in white paint, reading "All have sinned". Towards the end of the 1990s it was replaced for a short time by "Please Turn Over". For at least the last ten years now it has been painted out and graffiti free.

The plaque is adjacent to a very busy highway with no facilities for pedestrians, so it is not recommended as a stopping place at any time of day or night. A small section of parking area on the highway is available 100 metres (330 ft) to the west, just before a new sign for Perth Hills.

It is listed on the Places Database of the Heritage Council of Western Australia, but is not afforded legislative protection. There are plaques at other sites from the same year placed by the Western Australian Historical Society; one can be found at the Round House in Fremantle.

There are similar granite outcrops in this area of the Darling Scarp in John Forrest National Park to the north, and to the south Darlington, and Boya, Western Australia.

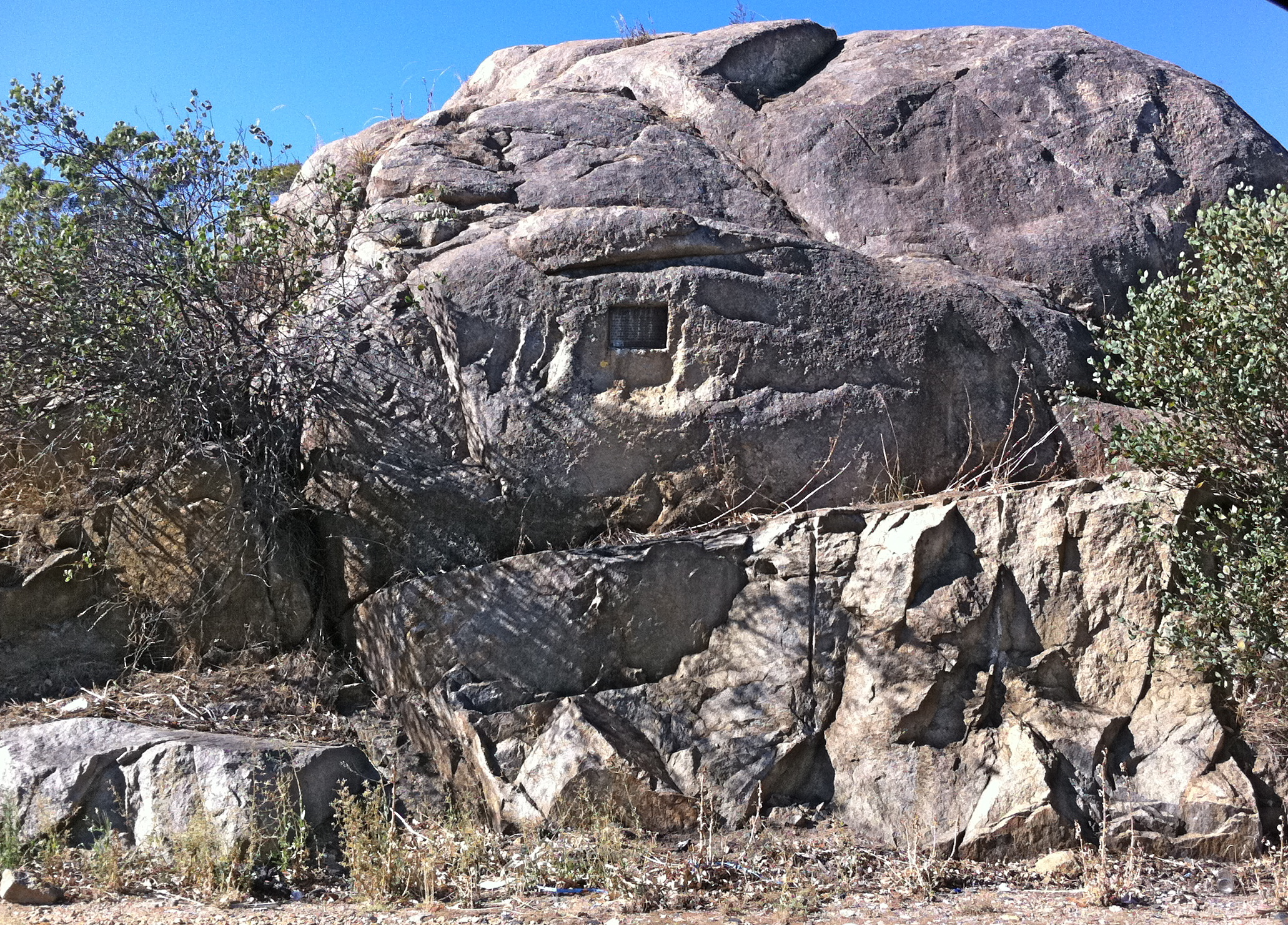
The rock from the south – from the highway

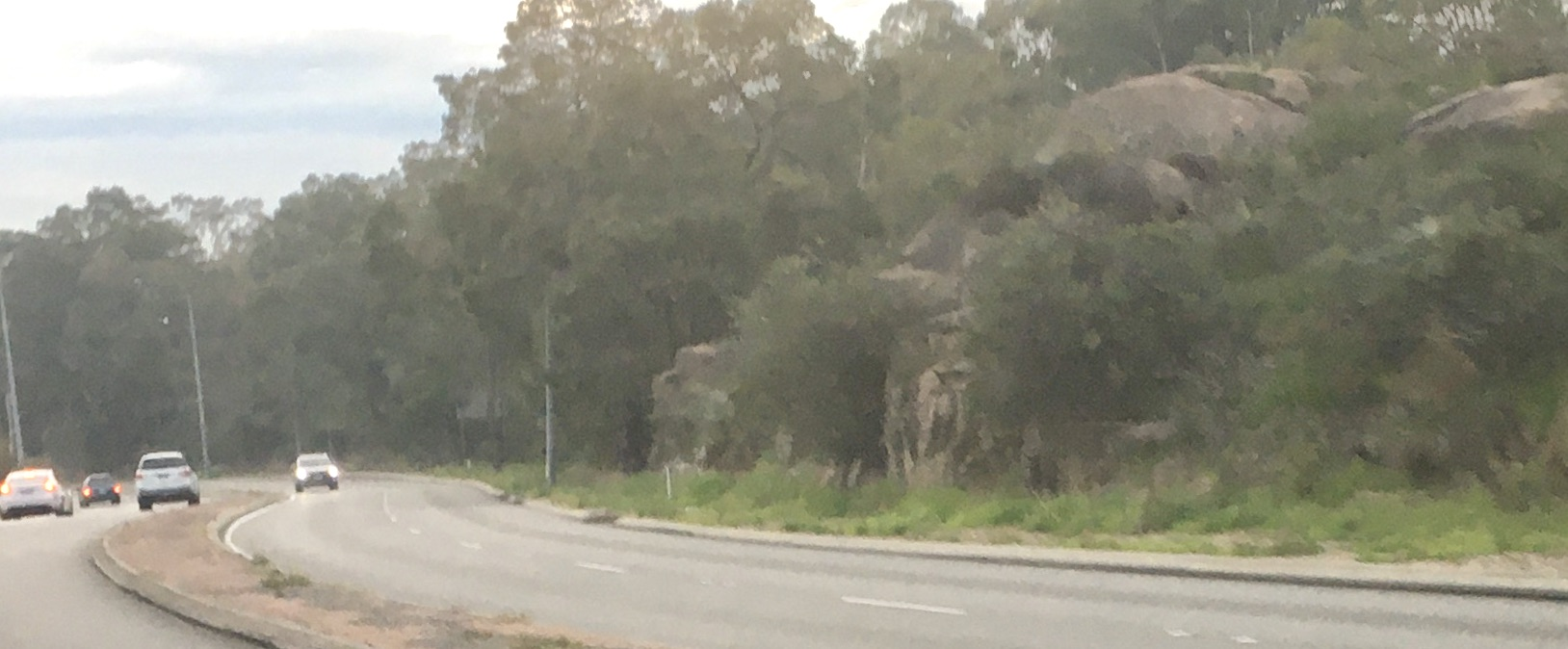
From the east in 2020
