= Electoral results for the district of Midland =

Western Australian district election results

This is a list of electoral results for the electoral district of Midland in Western Australian state elections.

== Members for Midland ==
Member	Party	Term
Michelle Roberts	Labor	1996–present

== Election results ==
=== Elections in the 2020s ===
2025 Western Australian state election: Midland
Party	Candidate	Votes	%	±%
Labor	Steve Catania	10,670	40.5	−26.6
Liberal	Mike Matich	7,037	26.7	+8.7
Greens	Sarah Nielsen-Harvey	2,660	10.1	+3.5
Independent	Sarah Howlett	1,936	7.3	+7.3
One Nation	Julie Anne Cottam	1,530	5.8	+3.6
Legalise Cannabis	Jane-Marie Southworth	1,298	4.9	+4.9
Christians	Brian Warburton	662	2.5	−0.2
Animal Justice	Delia Richardson	569	2.2	+2.2
Total formal votes		26,362	96.5	+1.0
Informal votes		955	3.5	−1.0
Turnout		27,317	83.3	+5.6
Two-party-preferred result
Labor	Steve Catania	16,014	61.1	−15.8
Liberal	Mike Matich	10,200	38.9	+15.8
Labor hold		Swing	−15.8	

Results are not final. Last updated on 26 March 2025 at 5:30 PM AWST

2021 Western Australian state election: Midland
Party	Candidate	Votes	%	±%
Labor	Michelle Roberts	16,684	65.8	+16.6
Liberal	Jo Cicchini	4,892	19.3	−9.9
Greens	Brendan Sturcke	1,697	6.7	−2.2
Christians	Ester Nabate	685	2.7	+2.7
One Nation	Teresa Olow	545	2.1	−5.8
No Mandatory Vaccination	Steve Kelly	399	1.6	+1.6
Western Australia	Brad Bedford	360	1.4	+0.5
WAxit	Mohit Bhasin	104	0.4	−0.6
Total formal votes		25,366	95.6	+0.3
Informal votes		1,169	4.4	−0.3
Turnout		26,535	83.9	+0.3
Two-party-preferred result
Labor	Michelle Roberts	19,131	75.5	+12.6
Liberal	Jo Cicchini	6,221	24.5	−12.6
Labor hold		Swing	+12.6	

=== Elections in the 2010s ===
2017 Western Australian state election: Midland
Party	Candidate	Votes	%	±%
Labor	Michelle Roberts	12,060	49.6	+7.3
Liberal	Daniel Parasiliti	7,032	28.9	−16.7
Greens	Matthew Biggs	2,127	8.8	−0.5
One Nation	Tony D'Angelo	1,915	7.9	+7.9
Shooters, Fishers, Farmers	Trent Passmore	690	2.8	+2.8
Micro Business	John Biltoft	249	1.0	+1.0
Matheson for WA	Greg Ross	230	0.9	+0.9
Total formal votes		24,303	95.3	+1.8
Informal votes		1,195	4.7	−1.8
Turnout		25,498	86.1	+1.4
Two-party-preferred result
Labor	Michelle Roberts	15,315	63.0	+12.6
Liberal	Daniel Parasiliti	8,976	37.0	−12.6
Labor hold		Swing	+12.6	

2013 Western Australian state election: Midland
Party	Candidate	Votes	%	±%
Liberal	Daniel Parasiliti	9,362	46.2	+11.5
Labor	Michelle Roberts	8,489	41.9	−4.9
Greens	Pippa Tandy	1,905	9.4	−5.6
Christians	Isaac Moran	520	2.6	−1.0
Total formal votes		20,276	93.6	−0.0
Informal votes		1,386	6.4	−0.0
Turnout		21,662	89.5	+2.6
Two-party-preferred result
Labor	Michelle Roberts	10,142	50.1	−8.2
Liberal	Daniel Parasiliti	10,118	49.9	+8.2
Labor hold		Swing	−8.2	

=== Elections in the 2000s ===
2008 Western Australian state election: Midland
Party	Candidate	Votes	%	±%
Labor	Michelle Roberts	8,968	46.8	−1.8
Liberal	Peter McDowell	6,645	34.7	+0.6
Greens	Caz Bowman	2,869	15.0	+4.5
Christian Democrats	Lukas Butler	687	3.6	+0.0
Total formal votes		19,169	93.6	−0.9
Informal votes		1,304	6.4	+0.9
Turnout		20,473	86.9	
Two-party-preferred result
Labor	Michelle Roberts	11,174	58.3	−1.3
Liberal	Peter McDowell	7,977	41.7	+1.3
Labor hold		Swing	−1.3	

2005 Western Australian state election: Midland
Party	Candidate	Votes	%	±%
Labor	Michelle Roberts	10,614	47.2	+3.2
Liberal	Charlie Zannino	7,884	35.1	+7.8
Greens	Tim Hall	2,428	10.8	+1.2
Christian Democrats	Karen Chew	837	3.7	+3.7
One Nation	Albert Caine	718	3.2	−7.1
Total formal votes		22,481	94.7	+0.2
Informal votes		1,263	5.3	−0.2
Turnout		23,744	90.4	
Two-party-preferred result
Labor	Michelle Roberts	13,126	58.5	−2.5
Liberal	Charlie Zannino	9,324	41.5	+2.5
Labor hold		Swing	−2.5	

2001 Western Australian state election: Midland
Party	Candidate	Votes	%	±%
Labor	Michelle Roberts	10,874	47.8	+0.7
Liberal	Ian James	5,689	25.0	−14.8
One Nation	David Gunnyon	2,539	11.2	+11.2
Greens	Jane Bremmer	1,916	8.4	+8.4
Democrats	Peter Markham	793	3.5	−9.7
Independent	Kev Cusworth	421	1.9	+1.9
Independent	Peter Bucknell	204	0.9	+0.9
Independent	Charles Eadon-Clarke	177	0.8	+0.8
Curtin Labor Alliance	John Burt	142	0.6	+0.6
Total formal votes		22,755	94.4	−0.1
Informal votes		1,348	5.6	+0.1
Turnout		24,103	90.9	
Two-party-preferred result
Labor	Michelle Roberts	14,306	63.5	+9.2
Liberal	Ian James	8,219	36.5	−9.2
Labor hold		Swing	+9.2	

=== Elections in the 1990s ===
1996 Western Australian state election: Midland
Party	Candidate	Votes	%	±%
Labor	Michelle Roberts	10,340	47.1	+0.4
Liberal	Anne Fergusson-Stewart	8,745	39.8	+1.2
Democrats	Michael Preston	2,890	13.2	+11.7
Total formal votes		21,975	94.5	−0.6
Informal votes		1,278	5.5	+0.6
Turnout		23,253	91.9	
Two-party-preferred result
Labor	Michelle Roberts	11,912	54.3	0.0
Liberal	Anne Fergusson-Stewart	10,032	45.7	0.0
Labor hold		Swing	0.0	
