= Darling Fault =

Geological fault in Western Australia

The Darling Fault is one of the longest and most significant faults in Australia, extending for at least 1,500 kilometres (930 mi) in a north–south orientation near the west coast of southern Western Australia. It is a major geological boundary separating the Archaean Yilgarn craton in the east from the younger Pinjarra Orogen and overlying Phanerozoic Perth Basin to the west. The fault zone is very ancient and initially formed during the Proterozoic Eon.

In the Perth area, the Darling Fault must once have coincided with the Darling Scarp, the abrupt escarpment immediately east of the city of Perth, but the scarp has since eroded eastward of the fault, leaving a formation of foothills known as the Ridge Hill Shelf. The fault is located on the western edge of the Ridge Hill Shelf; a good reference point of its location is the point where the Great Eastern Highway passes over the current Eastern railway line in Bellevue. When Greater Perth is viewed from an aerial perspective, a faint line can be seen running down the edge of the hills.

== General references ==
- Myers, J. S. (1992) Pinjarra Orogen, in Geology and Mineral Resources of Western Australia: Western Australia Geological Survey, Memoir 3, 77–119.
- Seddon, George (2004). Sense of Place (Facsimile ed.). Melbourne: Bloomings Books. ISBN 1-876473-53-3.
