= Greenmount, Western Australia =

Greenmount
- Suburb
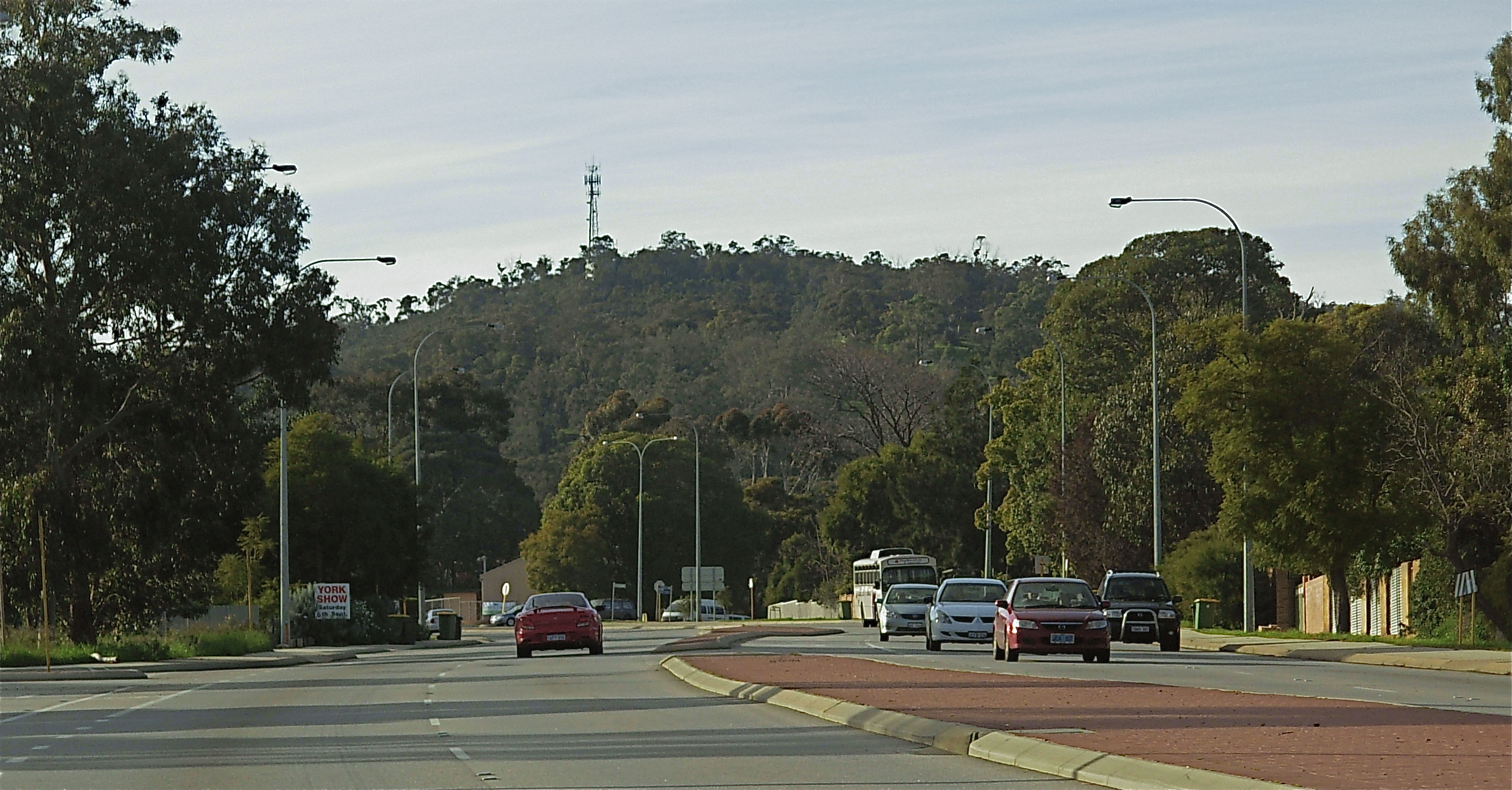
- Greenmount Hill from the Great Eastern Highway
- Interactive map of Greenmount
- Coordinates: 31.857°S 116.057°E
- Country: Australia
- State: Western Australia
- City: Perth
- LGA: Shire of Mundaring

Government
  - State electorate: Midland
  - Federal division: Bullwinkel

Population
  - Total: 2,666 (SAL 2021)
- Postcode: 6056
Suburbs around Greenmount
| Midvale | Swan View | Hovea |
| Bellevue | Greenmount | Darlington |
| Koongamia | Boya | Darlington |

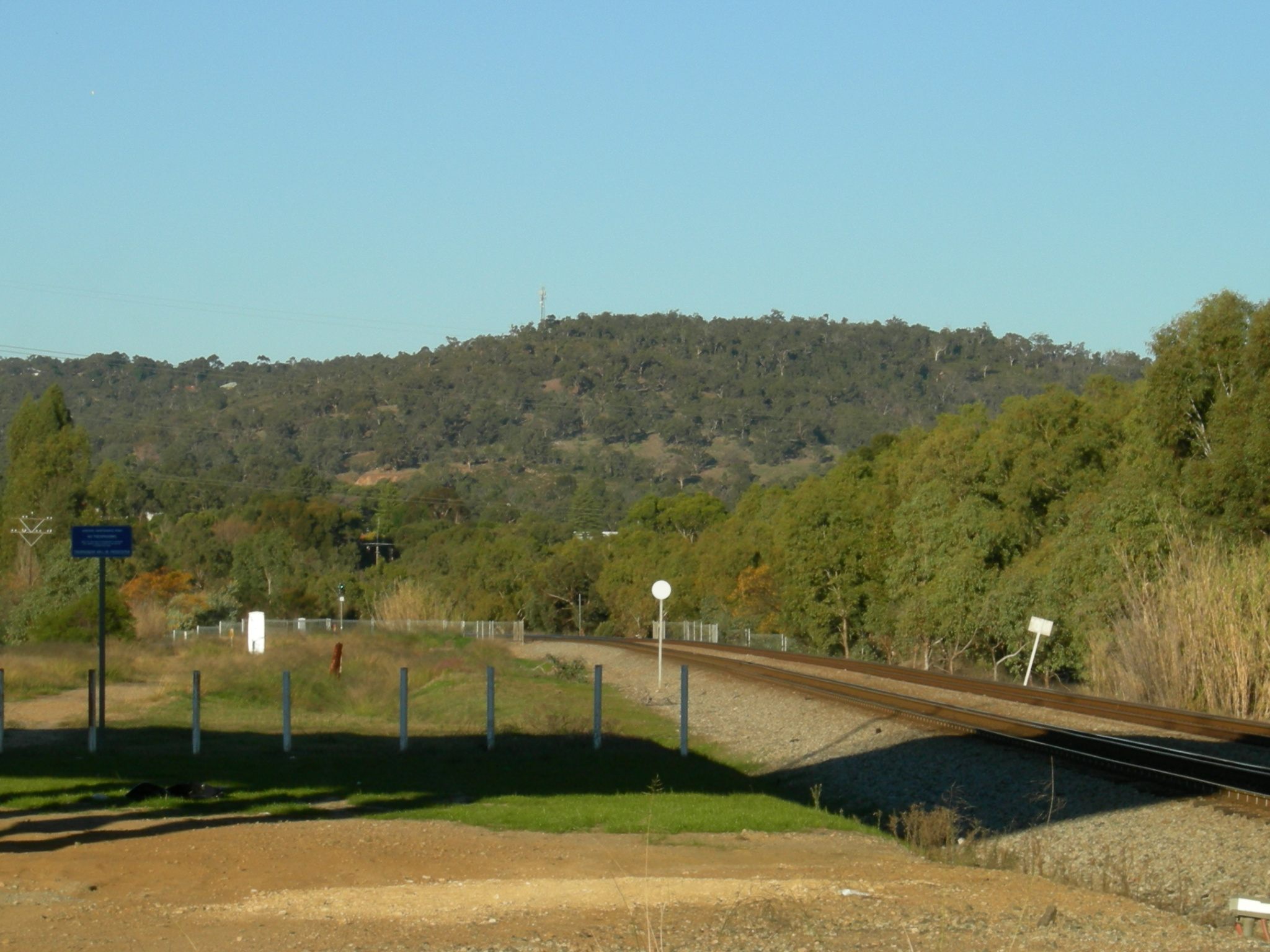
Greenmount Hill from rail underpass of Roe Highway

Greenmount is a locality and a geographical feature in the Shire of Mundaring, Western Australia, on the edge of the Darling Scarp. It is a vital point in the transport routes from the Swan Coastal Plain into the hinterland of Western Australia.

== Early colonial history ==
Ensign Robert Dale reached the summit on 18 October 1829. John Septimus Roe communicated with Dale over the York Road he had used the name Green Mount.

In the era of the Swan River Colony the name Greenmount was used for two points on the Darling Scarp. In the 1840s the York Road was known as York Greenmount, and the road further north along the scarp was known as Toodyay Greenmount. It is possible that these two locations might have had slightly different coloured foliage compared to the grey-blue-green colour of the scarp.

In 1854, Edward Du Cane was the supervisor of the building of a convict depot on the slopes of the hill. In the 1870s a government bluestone quarry was developed on the western slope of the hill.

== Chippers Leap ==
Chippers Leap is a memorial stone on the northern edge of the Great Eastern Highway between the two points where the Old York Road remains linked with the highway.

== Highway ==
Greenmount Hill, either by Old York Road or Great Eastern Highway, is the main ascent to, or descent from the Darling Scarp, and has been a regular site of vehicle breakdowns and accidents due to the slope.

Due to a large increase of heavy truck traffic using the hill, the truck arrester bed located at the lower end of the hill has been in place since an accident in 1993.

== Railway ==
On its western slopes and southern slopes the original Eastern Railway route travelled. On its western slopes and just to the north the later national park deviation ran. The current railway route still passes within a few kilometres to the west and north of the hill. Greenmount was a railway stopping place until 1954 when the Mundaring Loop was closed for passenger traffic; however, trains continued to work on the line to the Mountain Quarry in Boya until 1962.

== Transport ==
=== Bus ===
- 323 Midland Station to Swan View – serves Innamincka Road and Wooloomooloo Road

Bus routes serving Great Eastern Highway and Old York Road:

- 320 Midland Station to Mundaring
- 321 Midland Station to Glen Forrest
- 328 Midland Station to Chidlow

== Quarries ==
On its western slope and near its southern slope it has three unused quarries: Greenmount Quarry, Mountain Quarry, and Hudman Road Quarry. Greenmount Quarry was known as the Blue Stone Quarry in the 1870s, and was later associated in the late nineteenth century with Alexander Forrest. Mountain Quarry was a working quarry from the 1920s until the early 1960s. It is now a dedicated abseiling location, and is often designated as Boya Quarry. Hudman Road Quarry has in the past been known as Mr O'Connor's quarry, the Fremantle Harbour Works Darlington Quarry, the Public Works Quarry, and the Government Quarry.

Due to its visibility and lack of development on the hill, it has remained "green" since its naming in the 1820s. It has attracted the interest of some artists and photographers. The only spoiling is the front part of the hill (locally known as Sugarloaf), which was a pasture for over 60 years, and has a "green" that is not the endemic green of the jarrah forest that once covered the hill. Also bisection by a Western Power line across the hill, which corresponds with the old border of the Greenmount National Park, has created an eyesore, as well as a serious point of erosion.

It has also been the site of aircraft warning lights, since removed, and currently has a police communication tower on the western edge. It also has a mobile telephone tower with Optus and Telstra equipment near Padbury Road. Road access through the Greenmount National Park has been closed due to vandalism, except where permission and keys have been obtained from the Department of Environment and Conservation regional office in Mundaring.

The Greenmount locality is bisected by the Great Eastern Highway and other important roads.

== Undercliffe ==
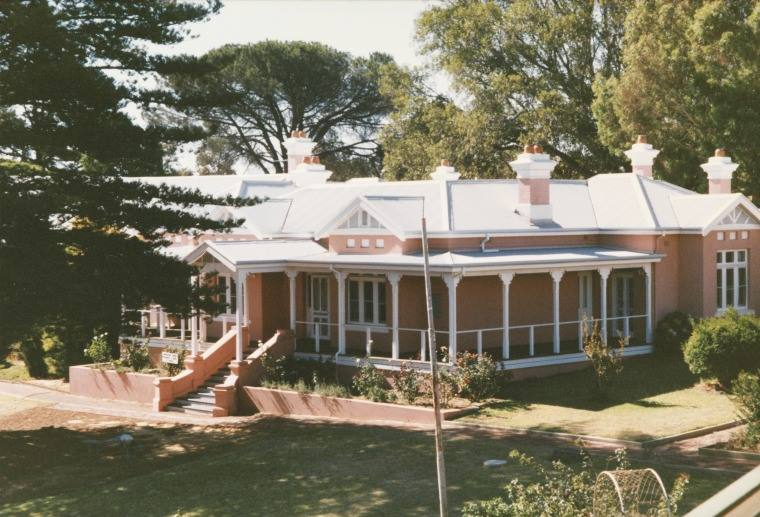
Undercliffe House

Undercliffe estate, located at Coongan Avenue, Greenmount is a Western Australia Government heritage listed site The original land parcel was south of the York Road and near what is now Wortley Road. It sits on an elevated site looking south over the former railway reserve and towards Helena Valley. In 1897, the estate was owned by Edmund Gilyard Lacey, who also owned a nearby sawmill, brickworks and granite quarry. He later sold it to his son-in-law, Percy Ford Robinson. In 1902, Robinson built Undercliffe House, an example of Australian Federation Queen Anne architecture, using the bricks from his father-in-law's quarry. The front entry door is surrounded by stained glass and highlights, which incorporates the name Undercliffe into its design, and the side panels contain the initials of Robinson.

During the Great Depression, Undercliffe House was used as a parish poorhouse eventually being donated to John Bell in 1937, which he then converted into a convalescent home. In World War II it housed convalescing soldiers. After the war, it was used as a nursing home, and continued in this capacity until 1981 when it was developed into a hospital. The facilities were upgraded and new buildings added for an additional nursing home, maternity wing and specialist consulting rooms.

In the early 20th century, the grounds and garden of the estate were an attraction to artists, train travellers and motorists. The substantial gardens remain in the large spaces between the buildings, together with some significant trees from the original garden. These include a large Moreton Bay fig tree, a Tree Society heritage-listed rare South American cyprus, a Norfolk pine, and several old date palms.

== Mundaring Municipal Inventory ==
The Shire of Mundaring Municipal Inventory has Greenmount Hill – as a landmark – with high aesthetic, social, historic and scientific significance.

== See also ==
- Greenmount National Park

== Sources ==
- Bourke, Michael J. (1987). On the Swan : a history of Swan District, Western Australia. Nedlands, W.A.: University of Western Australia Press for the Swan Shire Council. ISBN 0-85564-258-0.
- Elliot, Ian (1983). Mundaring – A History of the Shire (2nd ed.). Mundaring: Mundaring Shire. ISBN 0-9592776-0-9.
- Spillman, Ken (2003). Life was meant to be here: community and local government in the Shire of Mundaring. Mundaring: Mundaring Shire. ISBN 0-9592776-3-3.
