= Greenmount National Park =

National park in Western Australia

- IUCN category II (national park)
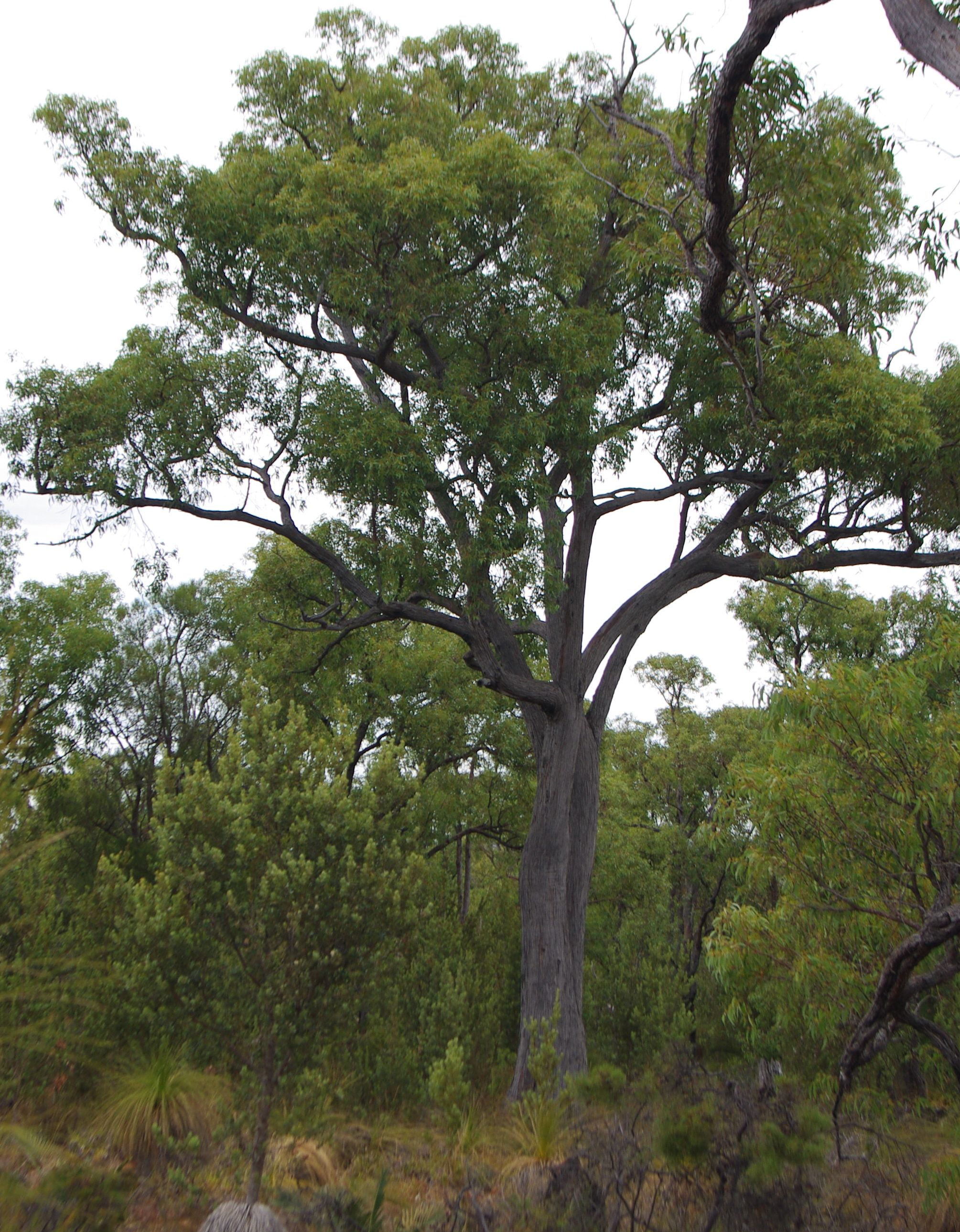
- Jarrah tree, Greenmount Hill National Park

- Location within Western Australia
- Location: Western Australia
- Nearest city: Perth
- Coordinates: 31°54′23″S 116°03′36″E
- Area: 2.02 km^{2} (0.78 sq mi)
- Established: 1970
- Governing body: Department of Environment and Conservation
- Website: Official website

Greenmount National Park is a national park in the locality of Greenmount, Western Australia, 22 kilometres (14 mi) east of Perth.

It is one of the smaller national parks along the Darling Scarp and is a component of the Darling Range Regional Park. Due to its proximity to John Forrest National Park, which used to be known as Greenmount National Park until 1928, and relationship to subsequent reserves to the south it is a vital scarp wildlife corridor.

Bus tours were available from Perth in 1933 with Hill's Bus Tours offering passengers a tour around the park on Sundays in September. Beam Transport Ltd. offered a similar service through the Park to Mundaring Weir in 1937.

As a feature adjacent to the Helena River Valley it has significance in Aboriginal folklore, and also featured very early on in early European settler's diaries.

Mountain Quarry is one of several blue stone quarries located within the park, popular with rock climbers and walkers. Vehicle access to the quarry site is restricted; however a car-park and picnic facilities including toilets are within walking distance of the main site, which is completely accessible on foot. There are several panels containing historical information about the site spread around as part of the popular Railway Reserves Heritage Trail, which runs close to the quarry.

The Boya/Koongamia leg of the Railway Reserves Heritage Trail, also known as the Bridle Trail, curves around the south-western edge of the park, crossing through the Mountain Quarry car-park and picnic area.

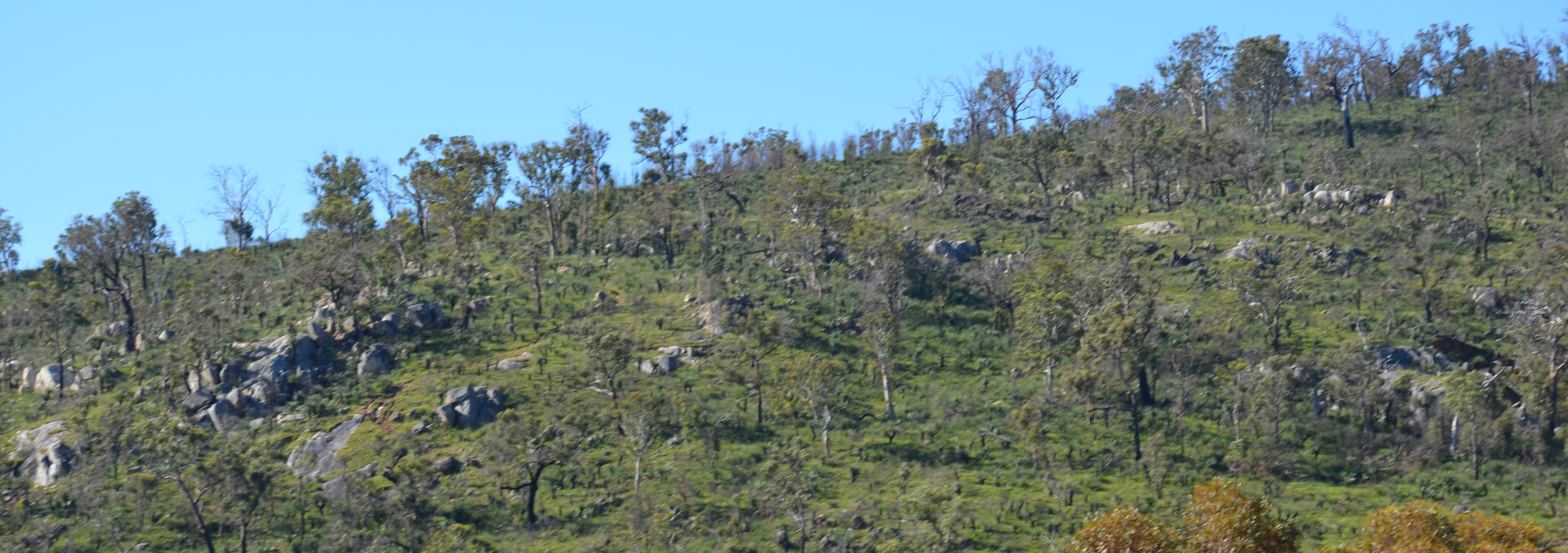
Over-burnt south west side of Greenmount Hill affected by regular bush fires

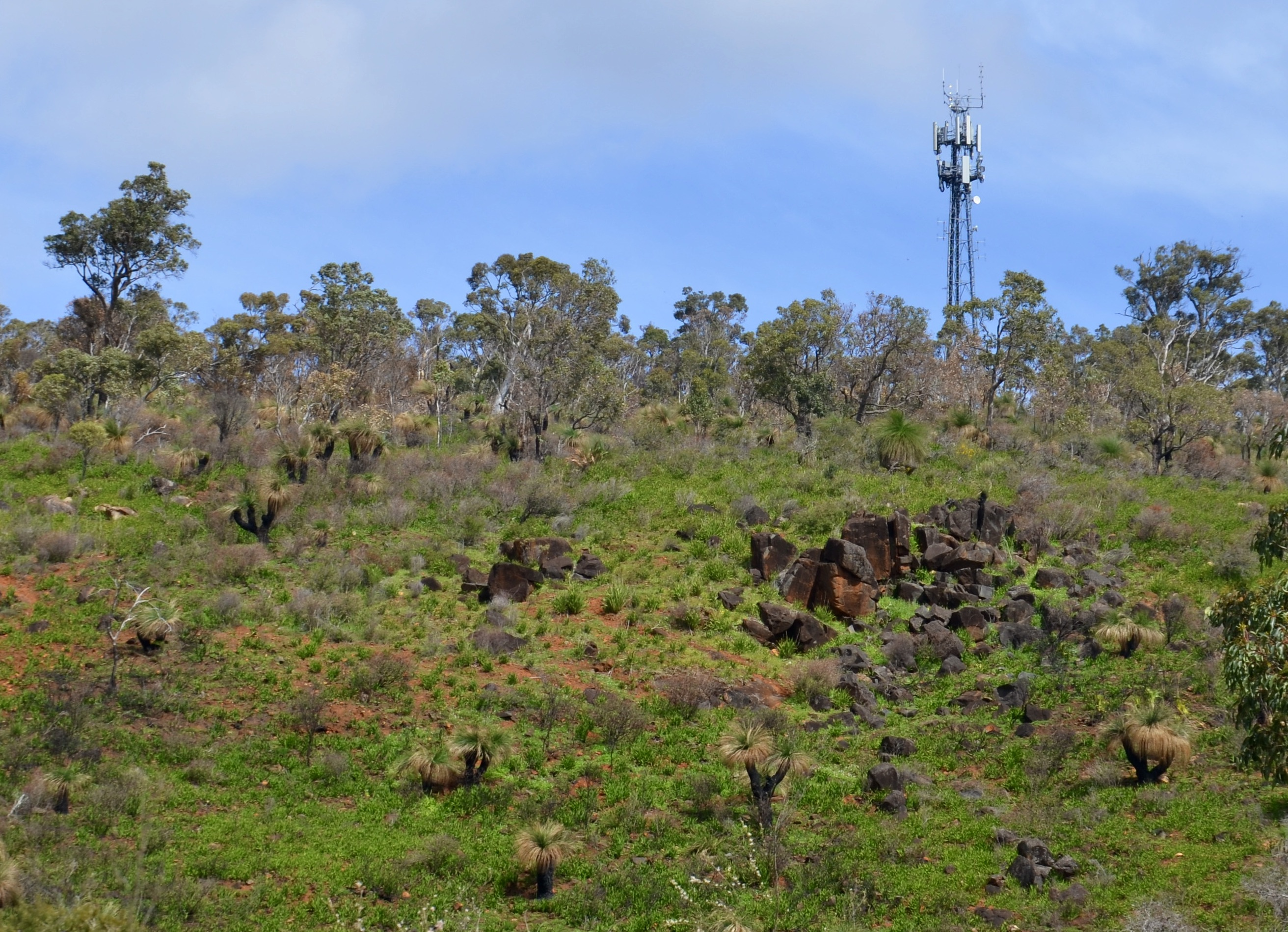
North side slope and communication tower

In the early 2000s significant bushfire damage occurred on the southern slopes of this park. Large fire-breaks bisect the park, serving as popular walking routes among locals.

The western and northern slopes, visible from Great Eastern Highway, have extensive Watsonia infestations.

In late 2005, the government authority in charge of the national park was taking steps to prevent vehicular access along the top of the ridge to the lookout due to vandalism and issues with residents adjacent to the park.

The park is situated along the side of Greenmount Hill and has views over the Swan Coastal Plain below and Perth to the west. The dominant vegetation in the park is eucalypts such as marri and wandoo along with an array of wild flowers and heathland along the northern slopes. The hill is steep and contain several breakaways and rocky outcrops.

== See also ==
- Protected areas of Western Australia
