= Molecap Greensand =

Geologic formation of Western Australia

- Stratigraphic range: Cenomanian-Santonian; ~99–85 Ma
- Type: Geological formation
- Unit of: Coolyena Group
- Underlies: Gingin Chalk
- Overlies: Osborne Formation
- Thickness: Up to 80 m (260 ft)

Lithology
- Primary: Greensand
- Other: Sandstone, claystone

Location
- Coordinates: 31.3°S 115.9°E
- Approximate paleocoordinates: 58.1°S 96.7°E
- Region: Western Australia
- Country: Australia
- Extent: Perth Basin
- Molecap Greensand (Australia)

The Molecap Greensand is a Late Cretaceous geologic formation, located in the state of Western Australia in Australia.

A proximal pedal phalanx from an indeterminate theropod has been recovered from the formation, alongside a jaw fragment of a pterosaur, possibly an ornithocheirid. Fossils of a mosasaur, cf. Platecarpus sp. were also reported from the formation.

== See also ==
- Cretaceous Australia
- List of dinosaur-bearing rock formations
- List of stratigraphic units with indeterminate dinosaur fossils
- South Polar region of the Cretaceous
