= Perth Basin =

Sedimentary basin in Western Australia

The Perth Basin is a thick, elongated sedimentary basin in Western Australia. It lies beneath the Swan Coastal Plain west of the Darling Scarp, representing the western limit of the much older Yilgarn craton, and extends further west offshore. Cities and towns including Perth, Busselton, Bunbury, Mandurah and Geraldton are built over the Perth Basin.

== Geological setting and evolution ==
The Perth Basin began forming in the Late Permian during the breakup of Gondwana, as the Australian continental plate began rifting away from the African and Indian continental plates.

During the Permian, what is now the Perth Basin was the eastern half of a rift valley that formed as the continental plates were pulled apart. This pulling apart, which continued until the Jurassic, led to the central zone subsiding as a graben allowing the sea to enter with the subsequent deposition of transgressive marine sediments. The Perth Basin architecture is dominated by listric, extensional faulting that formed during sedimentation and controlled the distribution of the sediments.

The primary mechanism for sedimentation was originally subsidence creating accommodation (space for sediments to accumulate), followed by fault extension and more recently, sediment loading, i.e. the basin continuing to subside because of the weight of sediments within it.

The eastern boundary of the main Perth Basin is the Darling Fault, topographically expressed as the Darling Scarp. Small outliers of the Perth Basin, such as the Collie Sub-basin, lie east of the Darling Fault.

== Stratigraphy ==
Letters in brackets after the formation name represent shorthand symbols used on geological maps.

=== Quaternary and recent ===
The Quaternary and recent sedimentation of the Perth Basin is represented by thin, impermanent sand dune systems, biogenic limestones, sandstones and some shales deposited during the last ~20 million years and during ice ages.

=== Cretaceous ===
- Lancelin Formation
  Upper Cretaceous glauconitic marl, infrequently developed on top of the Coolyena Group.
- Coolyena Group - Upper Cretaceous marine sediments.
  - Poison Hill Greensand (Kcp) consists of pale yellow unconsolidated weathered clay, glauconitic sandstone and shale. It conformably overlies the Gingin Chalk and is in turn overlain by unconsolidated Quaternary sands and alluvium.
  - Gingin Chalk (Kcg) is a weakly consolidated fossiliferous chalk composed of coccoliths, which interfingers and conformably overlies the Molecap Greensand.
  - Molecap Greensand (Kcm) is a fine to medium grained marine glauconite sandstone which unconformably overlies the Osborne Formation.
  - Osborne Formation (Kco) conformably overlies the Triassic Leederville Formation, and is composed of a marine sandstone, shale and interbedded shale-sandstone sequence from base upwards.
- Warnbro Group - Early Cretaceous marine sediments representing a transgression.
  - Parmelia Formation (J-Kp) forms the topmost hydraulic unit of the Yarragadee Aquifer. It is composed of 100–200 m thickness of well sorted fluvial sandstone deposited in the latest Jurassic to early Cretaceous. It includes a basal siltstone of lagoonal to lacustrine environment, the Otowiri Siltstone, which acts as an aquitard.
  - Leederville Formation (Kll) sandstone, siltstone, shale and mudstone deposited in deeper marine environments, with finer sediments predominant in the upper part of the unit. The unit attains a maximum thickness in the axis of the Yanchep Syncline is ~700 m, and thins eastward to approximately 500 m. The Leederville Formation interfingers and merges with the underlying Parmelia Formation in the north of the Perth Basin.
  - Gage Formation (Kwg) is a shallow lagoonal sandstone and shale deposited in shallow marine beach-dune-lagoonal environments.

=== Jurassic ===
- Yarragadee Formation (Jy) is one of the thickest units in the Perth Basin and forms a significant freshwater aquifer. It is composed primarily of non-marine fluviatile feldspathic, poorly sorted sandstones which are porous and poorly cemented, hence allowing for considerable groundwater reserves. The Yarragadee Formation grades from a shale-siltstone dominated base to a cleaner sandstone in the upper portions of the formation, probably representing increased subsidence or filling of the basin during the late Jurassic.
- Cadda Formation (Jd) conformably underlies the Yarragadee Formation and is composed primarily of shale and siltstone, with occasional beds of very coarse sandstone. The upper portions of the unit are composed of a marl grading into a marine limestone, representing stable tectonics at this time.
- Cattamarra Coal Measures (Jc) are a sequence of non-marine, probably fluviatile sandstones, shales and silts including bituminous coal, and are up to 300 m thick. The Cattamarra Coal Measures conformably overly the Eneabba Formation.
- Eneabba Formation (Je) is a lower-Jurassic terrigenous red-bed unit composed of interbedded sandstone with variably coloured limestone. The Eneabba Formation is conformable with the Lesueur Sandstone in the south of the Perth Basin and unconformable with the Kockatea Formation in the north, suggesting it is transgressive.

=== Triassic ===
- Kockatea Shale (Trk)
- Lesueur Sandstone (Trl)
- Woodada Formation (Trw)

== Economic geology ==
Cenozoic sand dune systems are locally being mined for mineral sands, mainly rutile (a source of titanium ) and zircon, by Iluka Resources and other companies.

Various formations from Cenozoic to Jurassic age are economically significant freshwater aquifers. Younger aquifers are an important suppliant to reservoir water in the city of Perth and elsewhere. The Yarragadee Formation, one of the thickest formations in the basin, is a very good aquifer in the southern part of the basin.

The Perth Basin contains Permian and Jurassic coal measures, the most important being mined primarily for electricity generation in the Collie Sub-basin at Collie in the south-west of the state.

The Perth Basin is also prospective for natural gas and oil, with recent exploration wells, including Origin Energy/Arc Energy's Hovea 2, confirming large resources of natural gas, but difficult reservoir geology and characteristics have prevented the full utilisation of these energy reserves. The oil is sourced from the Kockatea Shale.

Currently, a junior minerals exploration company is exploring the basin north of Perth for glauconite to produce potash fertilizer.

== Regions ==
Due to its shape and size, the basin has been surveyed and studied in distinctions such as offshore and onshore, north south, and central

== See also ==
- Darling Scarp
- South West Seismic Zone
