= Helena Valley, Western Australia =

Helena Valley
- Suburb
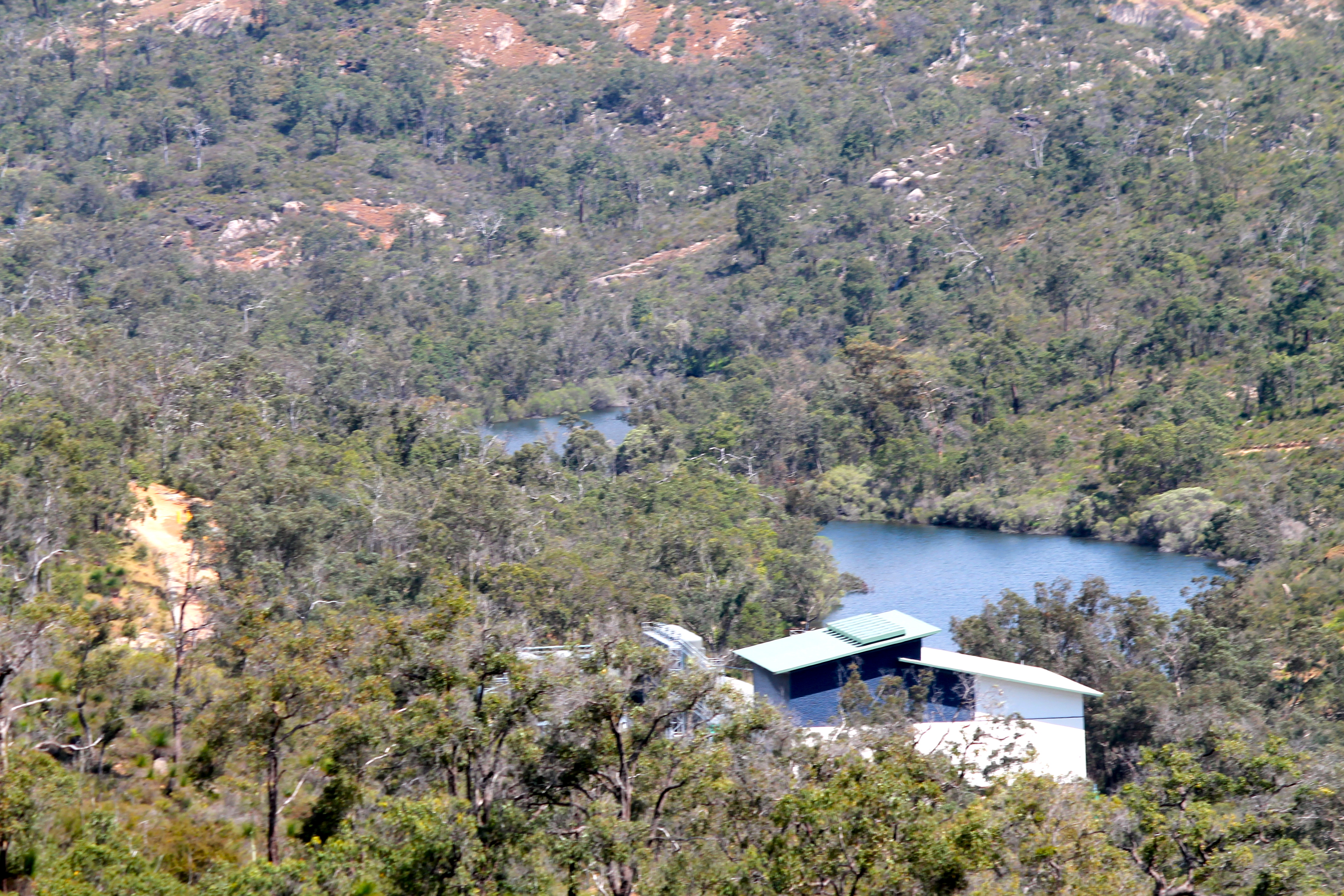
- Lower Helena Pumpback Dam
- Interactive map of Helena Valley
- Coordinates: 31.938°S 116.068°E
- Country: Australia
- State: Western Australia
- City: Perth
- LGA: Shire of Mundaring

Government
  - State electorate: Midland
  - Federal division: Bullwinkel

Population
  - Total: 4,130 (SAL 2021)
- Postcode: 6056
Suburbs around Helena Valley
Bellevue	Koongamia	Boya
Hazelmere	Helena Valley	Darlington
Bushmead	Bushmead	Gooseberry Hill

Helena Valley is the name of a river valley and a locality in the foothills of the Darling Scarp in Perth, Western Australia.

== Geology ==
The river valley is the centre of the catchment of the Helena River and extends from the edge of the Darling Scarp where Boya, Gooseberry Hill and Helena Valley define the "mouth" of the valley that opens to the Swan Coastal Plain, east and south east past Mundaring Weir and Lake C.Y. O'Connor to its origins in the region of Mount Dale.

The soils of Helena Valley are characteristic of the eastern Swan Coastal Plain, ranging from sand to loam and clay, with a neutral pH tending towards moderately acid.

== Locality ==
The locality is within the Shire of Mundaring, situated just south west of Boya and Greenmount Hill, 5 kilometres from Midland. It consists of many rural houses, but also contains six estates, and a shopping centre located in one of the estates. Helena Valley Primary School is located at the base of Greenmount Hill.

== Transport ==
=== Bus ===
- 307 Midland Station to Kalamunda bus station – serves Helena Valley Road
- 322 Midland Station to Glen Forrest – serves Scott Street

== Early settlers ==
- James Drummond, noted botanist, after whom the street Drummond Gardens is named
