= Collie Sub-basin =

Sedimentary basin in Western Australia

Coordinates: 33°25′S 116°18′E

The Collie Sub-basin is a pocket of Permian sedimentary rocks with an area of 225 km^{2}, enclosed within much older Archean rocks of the Yilgarn craton, near the town of Collie in southwestern Western Australia., Once considered a unique basin, this area, along with the smaller Wilga and Boyup Sub-basins to the south, are now classified as outliers of the Perth Basin, separated from the main area by ancient earth movements and erosion. The Collie Sub-basin contains significant coal reserves, currently being mined mainly for electricity generation.
