= Banyowla Regional Park =

Regional park in Perth, Western Australia

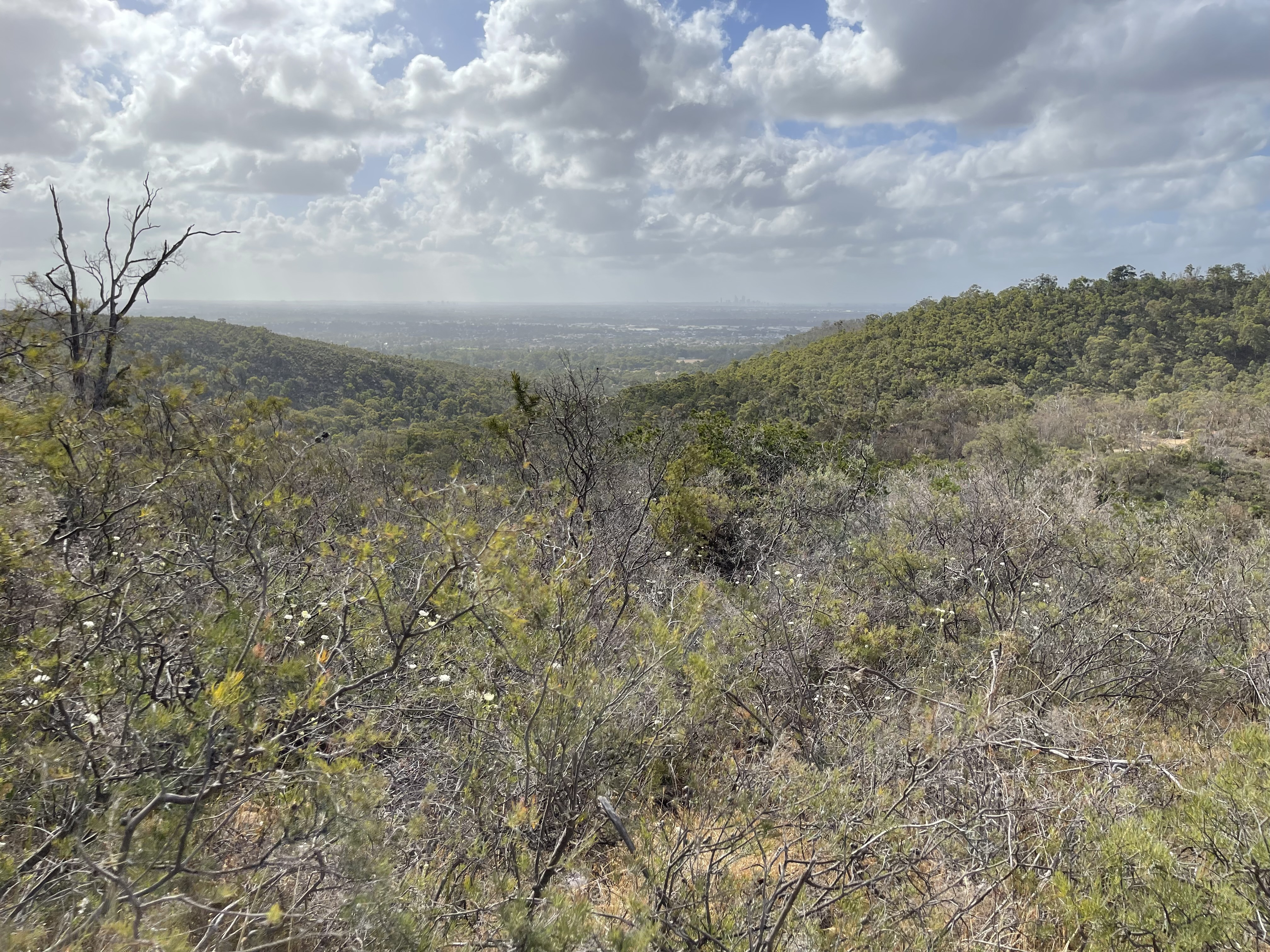
- View from Banyowla Regional Park, the Perth central business district in the distance
- Interactive map of Banyowla Regional Park
- Location: Western Australia
- Nearest city: City of Gosnells; City of Armadale
- Coordinates: 32°03′15″S 116°02′27″E
- Area: 2,607 ha (10.07 sq mi)
- Governing body: Department of Biodiversity, Conservation and Attractions
- Website: https://parks.dpaw.wa.gov.au/park/banyowla

Banyowla Regional Park, formerly Kelmscott-Martin Regional Park, is a conservation park situated 20 kilometres (12 mi) south-east of the Perth central business district in Western Australia. It is located in the Perth Hills, within the City of Gosnells and the City of Armadale. The regional park was re-named in 2008 after Banyowla, who was a Noongar elder at the time of European settlement.

Banyowla is one of eleven regional parks in the Perth region of Western Australia. The purpose of these regional parks is to serve as urban havens to preserve and restore cultural heritage and valuable ecosystems as well as to encourage sustainable nature-based recreation activities.

== History ==
The concept of regional spaces in Western Australia open to the public was first proposed in 1955, when the Stephenson-Hepburn Report recommended preserving private land for future public use in what would become the Perth Metropolitan Region in 1963. The Environmental Protection Authority (EPA) identified areas of significant conservation, landscape and recreation value in a report in 1983. In 1989, the state Government allocated the responsibility of managing regional parks to the Department of Conservation and Land Management.

A Regional Parks Taskforce was established in 1990 but the EPA reported in 1993 that the establishment of these parks encountered difficulties.

In August 2008, Minister for the Environment and Climate Change, David Templeman, announced that four regional parks and three national parks in the Perth Hills would be renamed to Aboriginal names, one of them being Kelmscott-Martin Regional Park, which became Banyowla Regional Park. These four regional parks had, prior to 2008, been part of the larger Darling Range Regional Park which had been formed in the 1990s.

== Cultural heritage ==
Both Banyowla, after whom the park is now named, and Captain Theophilus Tighe Ellis, whom the Ellis Brook Valley is named for, were involved in the 1834 Pinjarra massacre, the former as a victim and the latter as a perpetrator.

== Areas ==
The main areas of the park:

Image	Name	Suburb	Description	Co-ordinates
	Ellis Brook Valley	Martin		32.066216°S 116.040613°E
	Hardinge Park	Orange Grove		32.029506°S 116.035115°E
	Hillside Farm	Martin		32.054725°S 116.025108°E
	Lloyd Hughes Park	Kelmscott		32.117678°S 116.027393°E
