= Darling Scarp =

Scarp east of Perth, Western Australia

- Katta Moorda
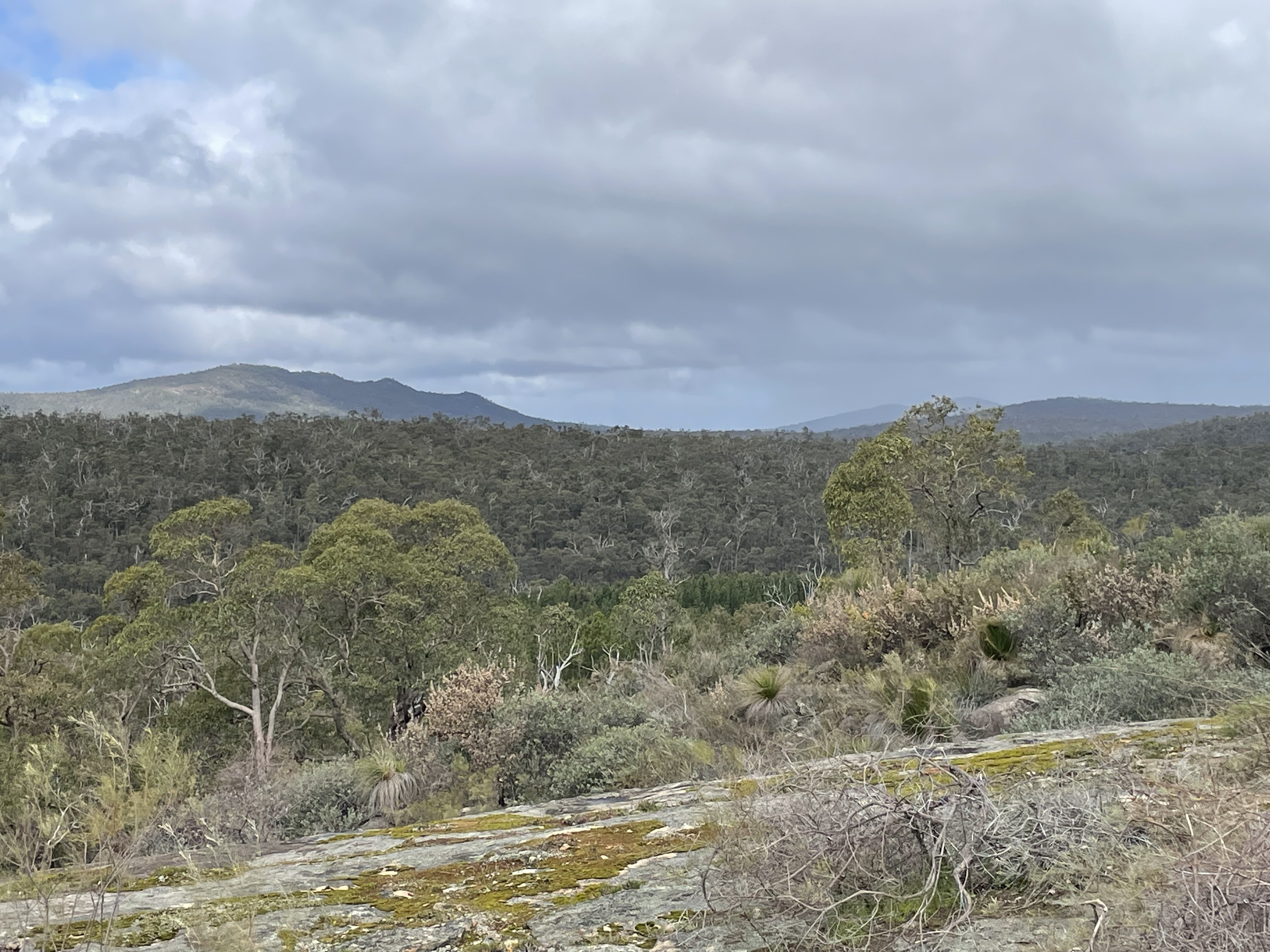
- Darling Scarp as viewed from Sullivan Rock (September 2022)

Highest point
- Peak: Mount Cooke
- Elevation: 582 m (1,909 ft); AHD
- Coordinates: 32.4239°S 116.312°E

Dimensions
- Length: 345 km (214 mi) north-south

Geography
- Country: Australia
- State: Western Australia
- Range coordinates: 32.9203°S 116.1294°E

Geology
- Formed by: Darling Fault
- Rock age: Cenozoic

The Darling Scarp (Nyungar: Katta Moorda), also referred to as the Darling Range or Darling Ranges, is a low escarpment running north–south to the east of the Swan Coastal Plain and Perth, Western Australia. The escarpment extends generally north of Bindoon, to the south of Pemberton. The adjacent Darling Plateau goes easterly to include Mount Bakewell near York and Mount Saddleback near Boddington. It was named after the Governor of New South Wales, Lieutenant-General Ralph Darling.

== History ==
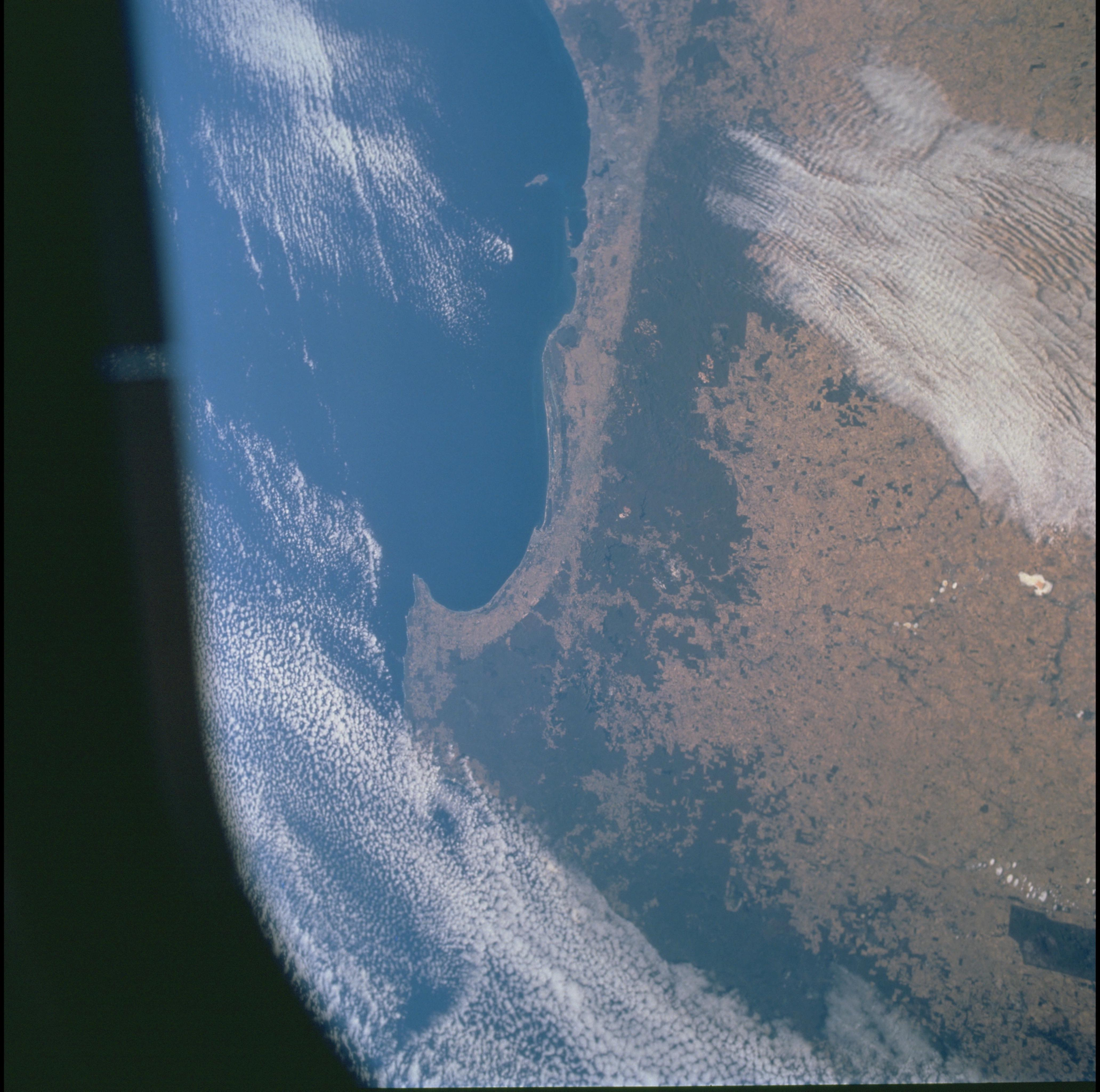
Southwest Western Australia from space. The dark green is dense vegetation on and above the scarp, which has been retained for forest reserve and water catchment purposes. The sharp vegetation boundary on the coastal side coincides with the edge of the scarp.

The feature was first recorded as General Darling Range by Charles Fraser, Government Botanist with Captain James Stirling aboard HMS Success in March 1827.

Maps from the 1830s show the scarp labelled General Darlings Range; this later became Darling Range, a name by which the formation was still commonly known in the late 20th century despite common understanding of it being an escarpment. There is also a tendency to identify the locations on or to the east of the scarp as being in the Perth Hills (or simply The Hills), despite extending over hundreds of kilometers.

The earliest traverses by British settlers in the Swan River Colony occurred in the 1830s. The best known of these is the expedition of Ensign Robert Dale, who appears to have gone from a point near Guildford, to the south side of Greenmount Hill and up through the Helena Valley.

== Geology ==
The Darling Scarp originated as the local expression, in the Perth area, of the extensive Darling Fault, a major and ancient geological discontinuity separating the Archaean Yilgarn craton in the east from the younger Pinjarra Orogen and overlying Phanerozoic Perth Basin to the west. The Darling Fault is exposed for over 1,000 kilometres (620 mi), from the area east of Shark Bay, to the southern coast of Western Australia east of Albany. The location of the scarp must once have coincided with the location of the fault, but the scarp has since eroded about 15 kilometres (9.3 mi) eastwards. The original location of the scarp is indicated in places by an unusual landform known as the Ridge Hill Shelf.

The Darling Plateau is covered by lateritic materials that cover the underlying geology.

The Archaean granites and gneisses of the Yilgarn craton form the high ground of the Perth Hills and can be observed in road cuts, with good examples in the Mundaring Weir area. The only exposed sediments of the Perth Basin, west of the fault, are of Cenozoic age, and are composed of materials such as sandy limestone, travertine and dune sand on which the city of Perth is built, including sand dunes of Pleistocene age formed during the last glacial period.

This area is also a distinct physiographic section of the larger Yilgarn Block province, which in turn is part of the larger West Australian Shield division.

=== Climate ===
The Scarp, like the rest of south west Australia, has a Mediterranean climate, with mild rainy winters and warm dry summers. Average annual rainfall is 1300 mm along the scarp, declining to the east and north.

Often the Bureau of Meteorology identifies different weather for "the hills" in comparison to that of the Swan Coastal Plain.

Also, in traditionally hot summers, strong easterly winds travelling across the scarp have presented serious issues for planes using the Perth Airport because of the alignment of the runways. On 2 September 1999, the number one engine of a Qantas Boeing 747, en route from Sydney Airport coming into land on Runway 06/24, struck the runway surface upon landing, due to wind shear caused by rolling winds on the Darling Scarp. In addition, orographic uplift is produced when rain clouds move over the hills, giving higher rainfalls in settlements in the ranges compared with their coastal neighbours.

== Flora and fauna ==
The scarp is part of the Jarrah Forest bioregion. The natural vegetation of the scarp is predominantly jarrah–marri forest, characterised by jarrah (Eucalyptus marginata) and marri (Corymbia calophylla), with bullich (Eucalyptus megacarpa) and blackbutt (Eucalyptus patens) in the valleys. The Darling Range ghost gum (Eucalyptus laeliae) is endemic to the western slopes of the scarp.

Heath is found on granite outcrops. Low woodlands of Banksia grow on sand sheets.

Native mammals include the quenda (Isoodon fusciventer), chuditch (Dasyurus geoffroii), woylie (Bettongia penicillata ogilbyi), and brush-tailed phascogale (Phascogale tapoatafa wambenger). Quokka (Setonix brachyurus) and western ringtail possum (Pseudocheirus occidentalis) are often restricted to riparian areas.

== Land use ==
The Darling escarpment has been exploited for stone quarries, forestry and bauxite mining. Extensive timber railways and timber mills and the supporting communities existed along the escarpment because of the high quality jarrah forests.

=== Dams ===
In the early twentieth century, most of the main rivers flowing off the escarpment had mainly been used for dams for water supply for metropolitan Perth. The dams on the scarp include:

- Mundaring Weir (on the Helena River)
- Serpentine Dam and Pipehead (Serpentine River)
- Wungong Dam
- Churchman Brook Dam
- North Dandalup Dam
- South Dandalup Dam (on the two Dandalup branches)
- Canning Dam (on the Canning River)

The only free flowing water from the Darling Range in the Peel Region is the Dirk Brook in Keysbrook and the Murray River.

The scarp also defines the easternmost limit of the various aquifers present in the Perth Basin sediments, most notably the Southwest Yarragadee Aquifer. The scarp forms a divide between the hypersaline groundwaters typical of the Yilgarn craton basement from the fresh ground waters of the Perth Basin. Some dams along the scarp are contaminated by seepage of saline water from the granite into the base of the dam's water column and must be periodically flushed to preserve water quality.

=== Rock quarries ===
Also in the early to mid-twentieth century numerous rock quarries existed on the edge of the escarpment - visible and affecting both the aesthetics and the environment of the escarpment.

In the area where the Helena River emerges from its valley to the sandplain, there are still four quarries evident, despite being unused as quarries for fifty years or more. Mountain and Stathams quarries are now managed as rock climbing locations.

- Bluestone quarry (1850s name), later known as Greenmount Quarry (1850s to 1920s), at Greenmount Hill on the west side of Greenmount National Park.
- Mountain Quarry (now usually signed as Boya Quarry), south of Greenmount Hill, which ceased operation in 1963.
- Byford brickworks (State Brickworks), shale scar visible from early 20th century to WW2 quarrying.
- Fremantle Harbour Works Quarry (sometimes, C. Y. O'Connor's Mole Reconstruction Quarry, and later known as the Public Works Quarry), now Hudman Road Amphitheatre at edge of Darlington - Boya localities border, operated from the 1900s to the 1930s.
- Statham's Quarry at Gooseberry Hill at northern edge of the Kalamunda Zig Zag formation.
- Armadale brickworks (State Brickworks), Bedfordale Hill, shale scar visible from 20th century quarrying, with an underground rail bypassing the South Western Highway to transport the ore.

There have also been visible quarries on the scarp in the Gosnells and Herne Hill areas.

Legislative restrictions upon such developments were initiated in the late twentieth century to prevent further visible scars on the western face of the scarp.

=== Bauxite mining ===
In the late twentieth century, the proving of bauxite deposits correlating to the extensive jarrah forests saw wide-ranging protests against the proposals to mine the forests. Campaign to Save Native Forests was one group to oppose the activity.

The lengthy process of protest forced the government and miners to check their original proposals, and wide-ranging processes to guard segments of the jarrah forests from mining ensued.

The current mining activity in the region is extensive - the main mines being Huntly and Willowdale.

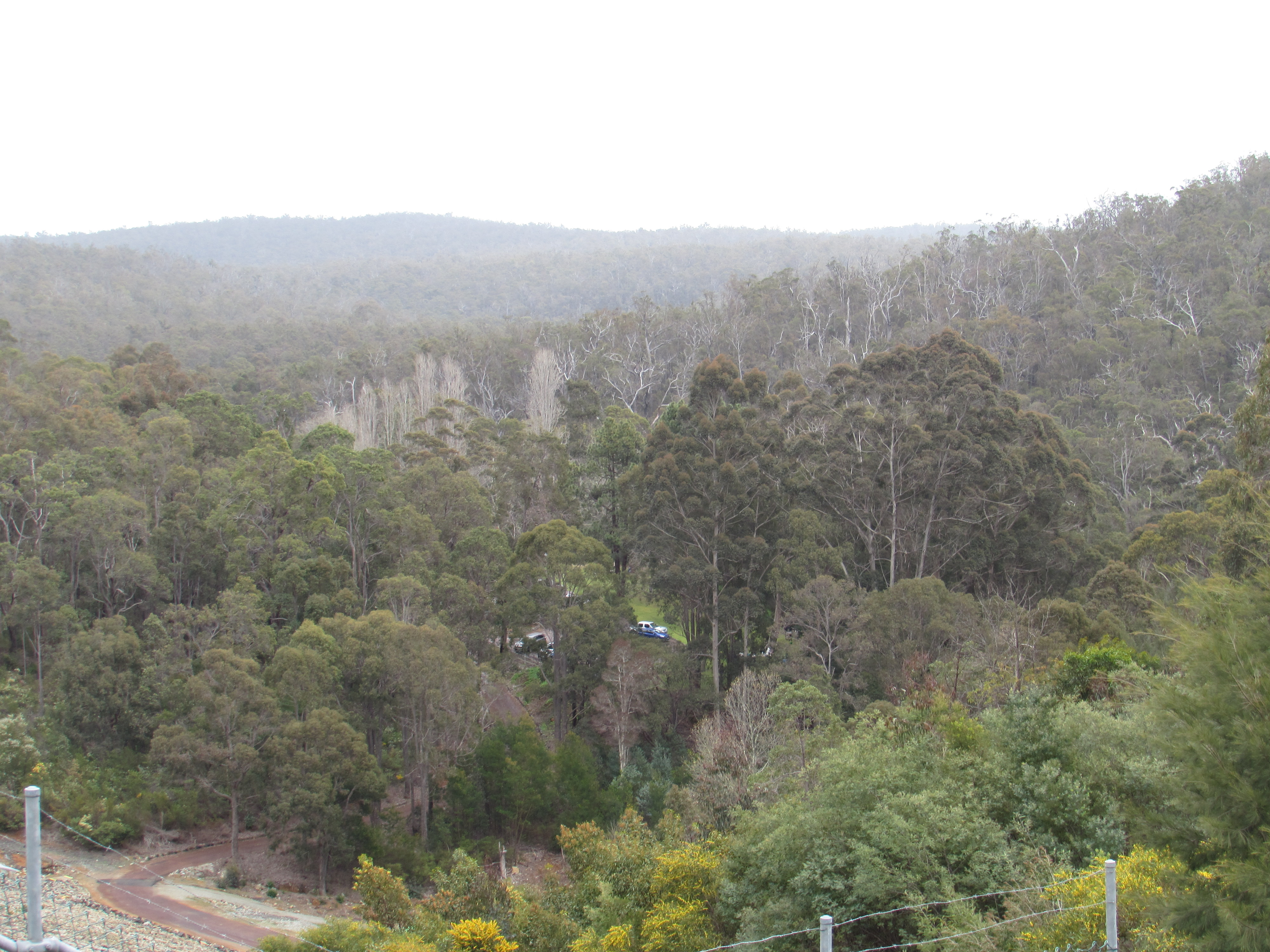
Darling scarp from Serpentine Dam

=== Railways ===
The building and developing of rail access across the scarp developed three separate main routes over eighty years.

- The Eastern Railway first traversed the Darling Scarp in the 1880s along its first route through Greenmount (where three of the above quarries were later able to use the railway).
- By the 1890s, the second route passed through Swan View Tunnel and John Forrest National Park.
- In the 1960s, the third route used easier grades through the Avon Valley
- The Kalamunda Zig Zag or Upper Darling Range railway ran up the southern steep side of the Helena Valley entrance until 1949.
- The Millars timber lines operating south to Yarloop, north through Jarrahdale up to Jarrahglen east of Byford and the Chandler mill.

=== Perth suburbs on the scarp ===
The localities or suburbs on the "edge" of the scarp are those that sit at its western edge, and in most cases command excellent views of the Swan Coastal Plain:

The suburbs near Midland and Kalamunda are often referred to as the Perth Hills.

Near Midland	Near Kalamunda	Near Armadale
Stratton	Carmel	Martin
Swan View	Gooseberry Hill	Roleystone
Greenmount	Lesmurdie	Karragullen
Darlington	Walliston	Bedfordale
Boya	Bickley	Jarrahdale
Helena Valley	Pickering Brook	Wungong

=== Television transmission towers ===
The suburbs to the south of Kalamunda are the locations of the main Perth Metropolitan television station transmission towers. There is also another site at Mount Lennard near Collie that Services the Southwest areas including Bunbury.

== Conservation ==
=== Dieback and fire ===
Also in the late twentieth century, dieback affecting jarrah timber in particular infected large tracts of the forest. Currently only the restriction of vehicle access has proved effective in slowing the spread of this disease. This gained greater acceptance and publicity through the decision to allow Rally Australia to operate along services roads provided that the vehicles had a thorough wash including the under carriage at the end of each stage.

In late 2004, the largest bushfire in the northern Jarrah Forest for at least 100 years created significant issues for the forest as well. As a result of this fire intensity the Government increased the volume of controlled burns along the entire escarpment to reduce the buildup of flammable materials.

In the early 2000s, Greenmount National Park and John Forrest National Park were repeatedly burnt by bushfires - in most cases through suspected arson.

=== Darling Range Regional Park ===
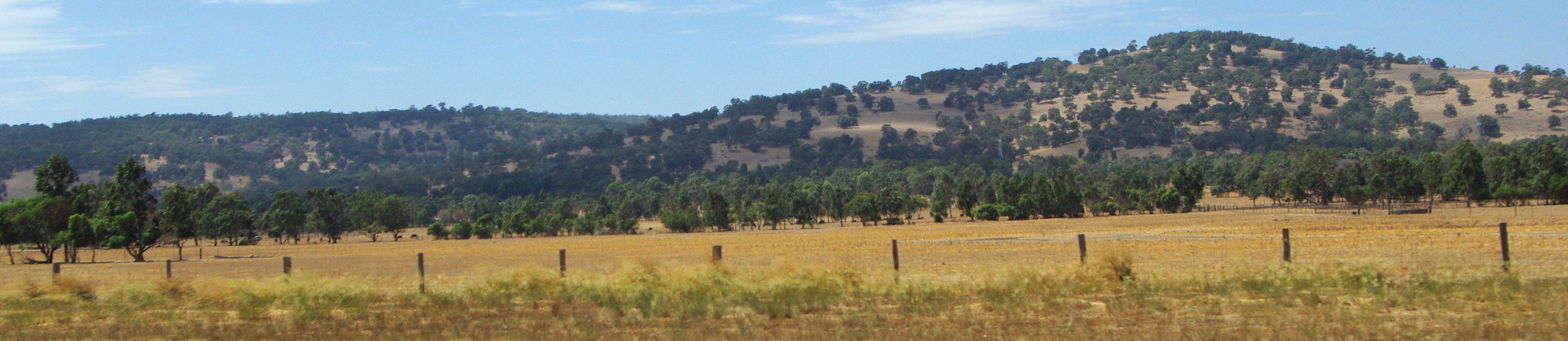
Darling scarp from South West Highway between Armadale and Pinjarra

A network of reserves of crown lands on the escarpment have been connected into a regional park to maintain and conserve parts of the escarpment.

In most cases the reserves or parks had individual names prior to being incorporated into the larger park, for example the Serpentine National Park, John Forrest National Park and the Greenmount National Park, or were simply known as State Forests (e.g. State Forest No.42).

Following a change in 2005, the separate parks have been known as the "Parks of the Darling Range", and take up 23,948 hectares on the scarp. Further in August 2008 the parks were given indigenous names:

- Beelu National Park
- Korung National Park
- Midgegoroo National Park (formerly known as Canning National Park)
- Banyowla Regional Park (formerly known as Kelmscott-Martin Regional Park)
- Mundy Regional Park (formerly known as Kalamunda Regional Park)
- Wooroloo Regional Park (formerly known as Chidlow Regional Park)
- Wungong Regional Park

== Highest points ==
- Mount Cooke – 32°25′S 116°18′E, with an elevation of 582 metres (1,909 ft) AHD
- Mount Solus – 32°28′S 116°13′E, with an elevation of 574 metres (1,883 ft) AHD
- Mount Wells – 32°41′S 116°20′E, with an elevation of 550 metres (1,800 ft) AHD
- Mount Dale – 32°08′S 116°18′E, with an elevation of 546 metres (1,791 ft) AHD

== See also ==
- List of escarpments

== General references ==
- Bean, Alison.(1993) A brief history of the Darling Range : for the Department of Planning and Urban Development. Perth, W.A. : The Dept. Darling Range Regional Park supplementary report; no. 4. ISBN 0-7309-5304-1
- Blainey, Geoffrey.(1997) White gold : the story of Alcoa of Australia St. Leonards, N.S.W. : Allen & Unwin. ISBN 1-86448-355-5
- (1970)The Darling Scarp : a natural entity: proceedings of symposium held at the Geography Department of the University of Western Australia, November 1969 Perth, W.A.: Nature Conservation Council of Western Australia,
- Department of Planning and Urban Development, Western Australia.(1993) The Natural resources of the Darling Ranges Perth, W.A. : The Dept., Darling Range Regional Park supplementary report; no. 2. ISBN 0-7309-5302-5
- Murphy, Mike.(1998) ( Coles, Helena - editor) Jarrahdalians : the story of the Jarrahdale Mine Booragoon, W.A. Alcoa of Australia. ISBN 0-646-36670-X
- Myers JS (1992) Pinjarra Orogen, in Geology and Mineral Resources of Western Australia: Western Australia Geological Survey, Memoir 3, 77-119.
- Schur, Basil. (1985)Jarrah forest or bauxite dollars? : a critique of bauxite mine rehabilitation in the jarrah forests of southwestern Australia Perth, W.A. : Campaign to Save Native Forests (W.A.). ISBN 0-9597449-7-5 (pbk.)
- Watson, Lindsay (1995) The Railway History Of Midland Junction : Commemorating The Centenary Of Midland Junction, 1895-1995 Swan View, W.A : L & S Drafting in association with the Shire of Swan and the Western Australian Light Railway Preservation Association.
