= Electoral district of Midland =

State electoral district of Western Australia

Midland Western Australia—Legislative Assembly
- Interactive map of electoral district boundaries from the 2025 state election
- State: Western Australia
- Dates current: 1996–present
- MP: Steve Catania
- Party: Labor
- Namesake: Midland
- Electors: 32,809 (2025)
- Area: 57 km^{2} (22.0 sq mi)
- Demographic: Metropolitan
- Coordinates: 31.89°S 116.03°E
Electorates around Midland:
West Swan	Swan Hills	Kalamunda
Bassendean	Midland	Kalamunda
Belmont	Forrestfield	Kalamunda

Midland is an electoral district of the Legislative Assembly in the Australian state of Western Australia.

The district is located in the eastern suburbs of Perth.

Midland has been held by the Labor since its creation, however it was retained by Labor at the 2013 election by 23 votes, which made it the most marginal seat in the Western Australian parliament during the 2013–2017 term.

== Geography ==
Midland is based in the outer eastern suburbs of Perth. It includes the communities of Bellevue, Boya, Greenmount, Guildford, Hazelmere, Helena Valley, Jane Brook, Koongamia, Midland, Midvale, Stratton, Swan View, Viveash, Woodbridge, as well as parts of the communities of Darlington, Middle Swan, Red Hill, and South Guildford.

== History ==
Midland was first created for the 1996 state election. It largely replaced the abolished seat of Helena, with another portion coming from the abolished seat of Glendalough. The district's first representative was Labor's Michelle Roberts, the last member for Glendalough. Roberts has held the seat ever since.

The seat was originally created as a marginal Labor seat, and remained so in the 1996 election. However, Roberts picked up a healthy swing of nine percent in 2001 as her party won government. She was reelected in 2005 with only a small swing against her even as her party was convincingly reelected. She served as a prominent minister in the Gallop and Carpenter governments.

A redistribution ahead of the 2008 election made Midland slightly more secure for Roberts, and she was reelected even as her party narrowly lost government. In 2013, however, Roberts was nearly defeated by Liberal challenger Daniel Parasiliti, with only Green preferences allowing her to survive by 24 votes. Roberts saw off Parasiliti with somewhat less difficulty in a 2017 rematch as her party regained government on the strength of a strong showing in Perth, picking up enough of a swing to make Midland a safe Labor seat in one stroke. She consolidated that swing in 2021 amid the massive Labor wave that swept through the state that year, and now sits on a margin of 25.5 percent. She was elected as Speaker of the Legislative Assembly, the first woman to hold the post.

== Members for Midland ==
Member	Party	Term
Michelle Roberts	Labor	1996–2025
Steve Catania	Labor	2025–present

== Election results ==
2025 Western Australian state election: Midland
Party	Candidate	Votes	%	±%
Labor	Steve Catania	10,514	40.4	−26.6
Liberal	Mike Matich	6,942	26.7	+8.7
Greens	Sarah Nielsen-Harvey	2,616	10.1	+3.5
Independent	Sarah Howlett	1,895	7.3	+7.3
One Nation	Julie Anne Cottam	1,529	5.9	+3.7
Legalise Cannabis	Jane-Marie Southworth	1,287	4.9	+4.9
Christians	Brian Warburton	657	2.5	−0.2
Animal Justice	Delia Richardson	562	2.2	+2.2
Total formal votes		26,002	95.1	−0.5
Informal votes		1,350	4.9	+0.5
Turnout		27,352	83.4	+5.7
Two-party-preferred result
Labor	Steve Catania	15,818	60.9	−16.0
Liberal	Mike Matich	10,155	39.1	+16.0
Labor hold		Swing	−16.0	
