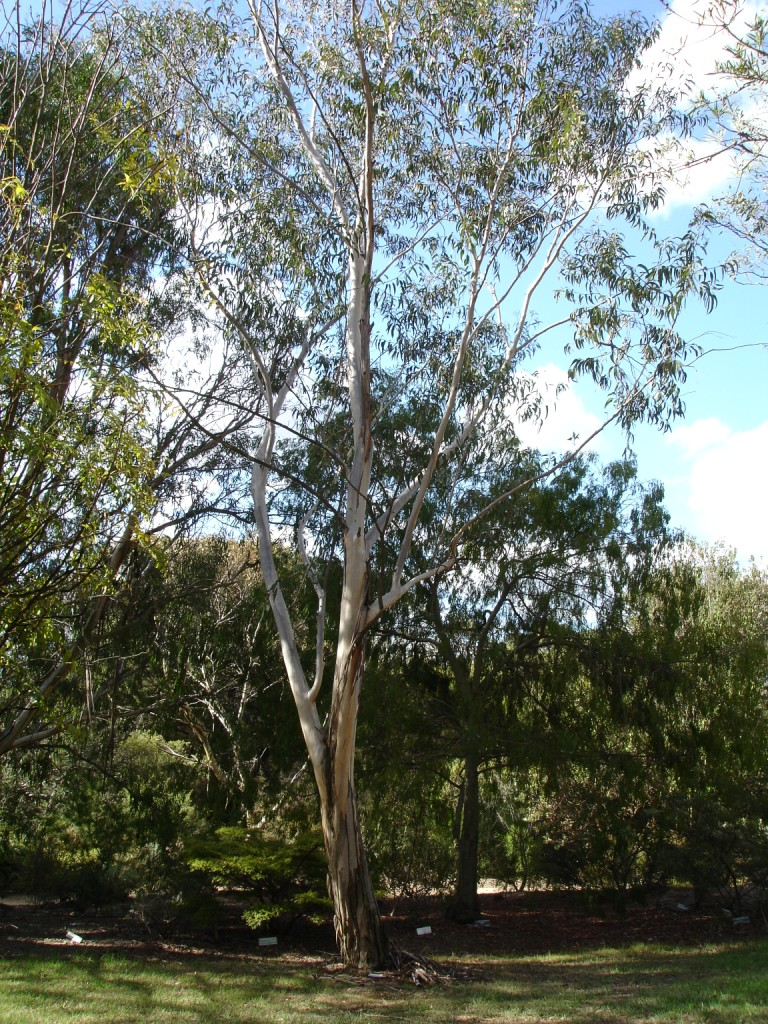
- Eucalyptus megacarpa, in Maranoa Gardens

Scientific classification
- Kingdom: Plantae
- Clade: Embryophytes
- Clade: Tracheophytes
- Clade: Angiosperms
- Clade: Eudicots
- Clade: Rosids
- Order: Myrtales
- Family: Myrtaceae
- Genus: Eucalyptus
- Species: E. megacarpa

Binomial name
- Eucalyptus megacarpa F.Muell.
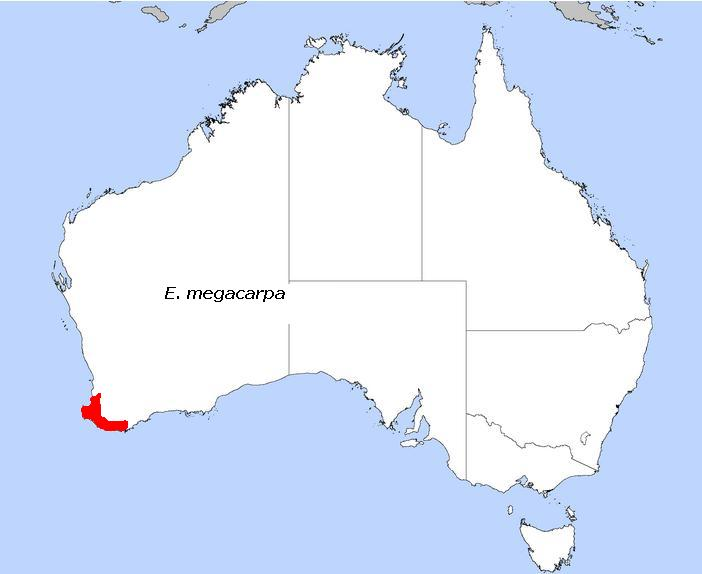
- E. megacarpa, field distribution

= Eucalyptus megacarpa =

Bullich

Species of eucalyptus

Eucalyptus megacarpa, commonly known by its Noongar name of bullich, is a species of robust mallee or small to medium-sized tree with a scattered distribution in the forests of the south-west of Western Australia. It has smooth bark throughout, lance-shaped to curved adult leaves, flower buds in groups of three, white flowers and cup-shaped, bell-shaped or hemispherical fruit.

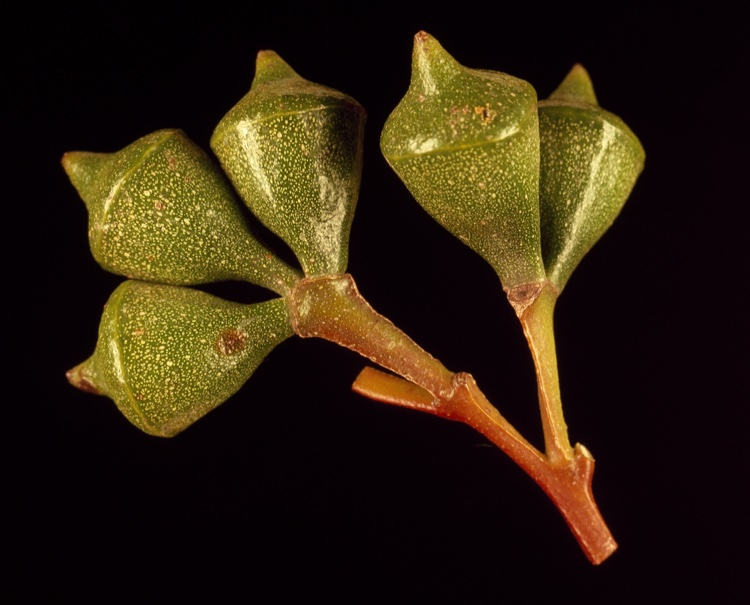
Flower buds

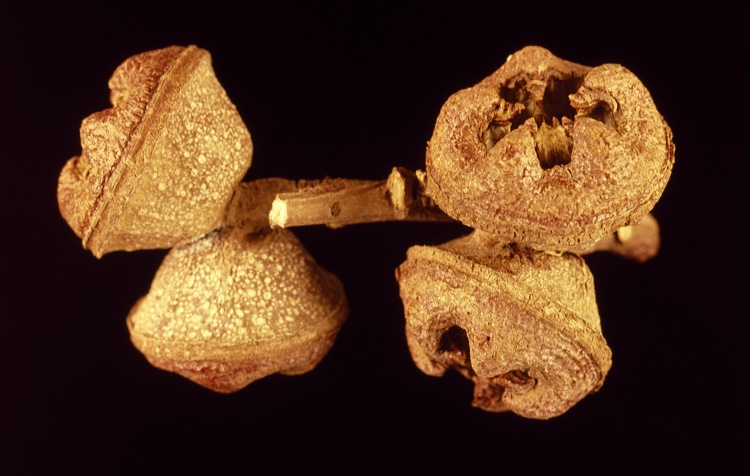
Fruit

== Description ==
Eucalyptus megacarpa is a tree that typically grows to a height of 20 to 35 metres (66 to 115 ft) or a robust mallee to 5 m (16 ft), and forms a lignotuber. The bark is smooth throughout, mottled grey, reddish-grey or white. Young plants and coppice regrowth have sessile, broadly lance-shaped leaves that are 100–130 mm (3.9–5.1 in) long and 35–50 mm (1.4–2.0 in) wide. Adult leaves are the same shade of dull to slightly glossy green on both sides, lance-shaped to curved, 70–140 mm (2.8–5.5 in) long and 15–33 mm (0.59–1.30 in) wide on a petiole 13–35 mm (0.51–1.38 in) long. The flower buds are arranged in leaf axils in groups of three on a flat, unbranched peduncle 12–20 mm (0.47–0.79 in) long, the individual buds on pedicels up to 4 mm (0.16 in) long. Mature buds are oval or pear-shaped, 15–22 mm (0.59–0.87 in) long and 12–17 mm (0.47–0.67 in) wide with a beaked operculum. Flowering occurs between April and November and the flowers are white. The fruit is a woody cup-shaped, bell-shaped or hemispherical capsule 12–19 mm (0.47–0.75 in) long and 18–30 mm (0.71–1.18 in) wide.

== Taxonomy ==
Eucalyptus megacarpa was first formally described by the botanist Ferdinand von Mueller in 1860 in Volume 2 of Fragmenta phytographiae Australiae from samples collected by George Maxwell near Wilson Inlet in 1858. The specific epithet (megacarpa) is a Latin word meaning "large-fruited".

== Distribution and habitat ==
Bullich grows in forest near swamps and along the banks of streams, although the mallee or smaller tree form is found on hillsides. It occurs from near Perth to Cape Leeuwin, Albany and the Stirling Range in the Esperance Plains, Jarrah Forest, Swan Coastal Plain and Warren bioregions where it grows in sand and sandy loam soils over limestone.

== Conservation status ==
This eucalypt is classified as "not threatened" in Western Australia by the Western Australian Government Department of Parks and Wildlife.

== Use in horticulture ==
The tree is sold commercially either in seed form or as tube stock. It grows well in a full sun position, will tolerate extended dry period and light frost. The tree can grow in a variety of soil types. It has an average growth rate and is grown as a shade tree in bush style gardens where it attracts birds.

== See also ==
- List of Eucalyptus species
