= Ridge Hill Shelf =

Geographical feature in Western Australia

The Ridge Hill Shelf is a landform that forms part of the foothills of the Darling Scarp, a low escarpment that runs parallel with the west coast in southwest Western Australia. It was formed by coastal erosion of the scarp in the Pleistocene, when the sea level was higher, and the scarp located further west than at present. The action of coastal forces produced sand dunes that subsequently lithified into eolianite, and eroded the ironstone of the scarp, resulting in an iron-rich sandstone with a laterite cap. The iron gives the sandstone a dull purple-brown colour; depending on the extent of iron-enrichment, the sandstone may appear predominantly yellow, predominantly purple-brown, or a mottled combination of the two.

The shelf is about 250 feet (76 m) high on average, and is therefore well-drained. It is largely vegetated by a forest of Eucalyptus marginata (jarrah) and Corymbia calophylla (marri), with an understorey of Banksia, Casuarina fraseriana and Xylomelum occidentale (woody pear).

Some publications identify the Ridge Hill Shelf with the foothills of the scarp, but this is incorrect. The foothills are about 15 kilometres wide, and largely continuous, whereas the Ridge Hill Shelf is no more than 3 kilometres wide and highly discontinuous.
