= Steve Catania =

Western Australian politician

Steve Catania MLA

Member of the Western Australian Legislative Assembly for Midland
- Incumbent
- Assumed office 8 March 2025
- Preceded by: Michelle Roberts

Personal details
- Party: Labor
- Relations: Vince Catania (brother)
- Parent: Nick Catania (father)
- Website: stevecatania.com.au

Steve Catania is an Australian politician from the Labor Party who is member of the Western Australian Legislative Assembly for the electoral district of Midland. He won his seat at the 2025 Western Australian state election.

Catania is a lawyer by profession. His father is Nick Catania and his brother is Vince Catania.

Western Australian Legislative Assembly
Preceded by Michelle Roberts	Member for Midland; 2025–present	Incumbent
