= Mahogany Inn =

Historic building in Mahogany Creek, Western Australia

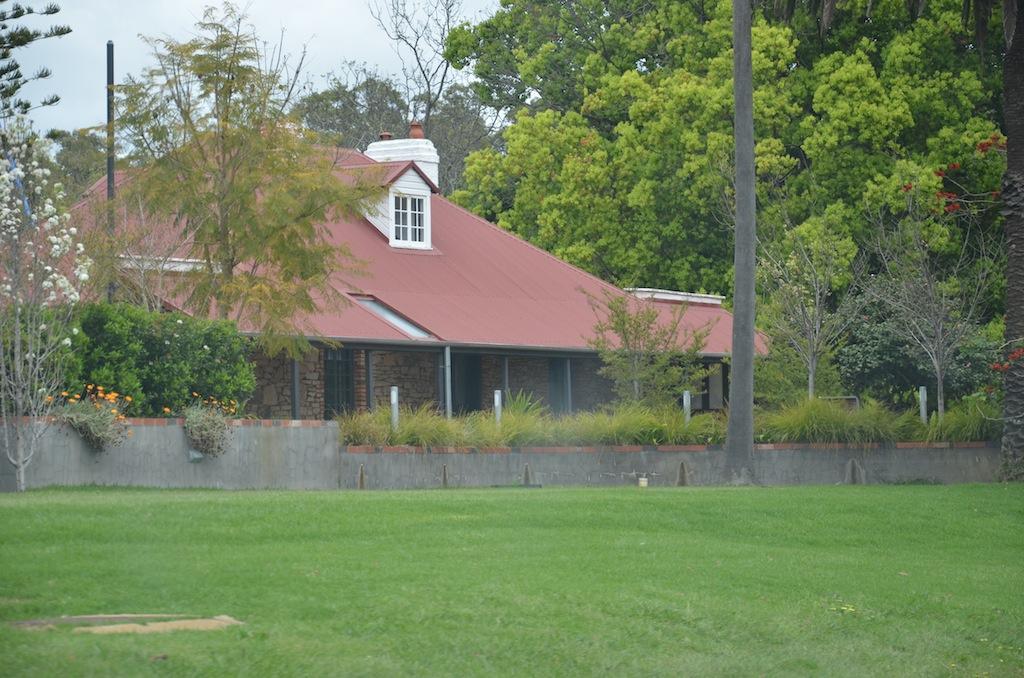

- Location within Perth

General information
- Type: Australian pub
- Location: Mahogany Creek, Western Australia
- Coordinates: 31.900717°S 116.134915°E

Western Australia Heritage Register
- Designated: 9 September 2003
- Reference no.: 1693

The Mahogany Inn, also called the Old Mahogany Inn, is an historic building at the Great Eastern Highway in Mahogany Creek in Western Australia.

Under various owners and tenants, a range of brief histories were produced of the inn, as well as the occasional newspaper article.

The inn has had a range of modifications in surrounding grounds and buildings, however the main building remains intact.
