= Boya, Western Australia =

Boya
- Suburb
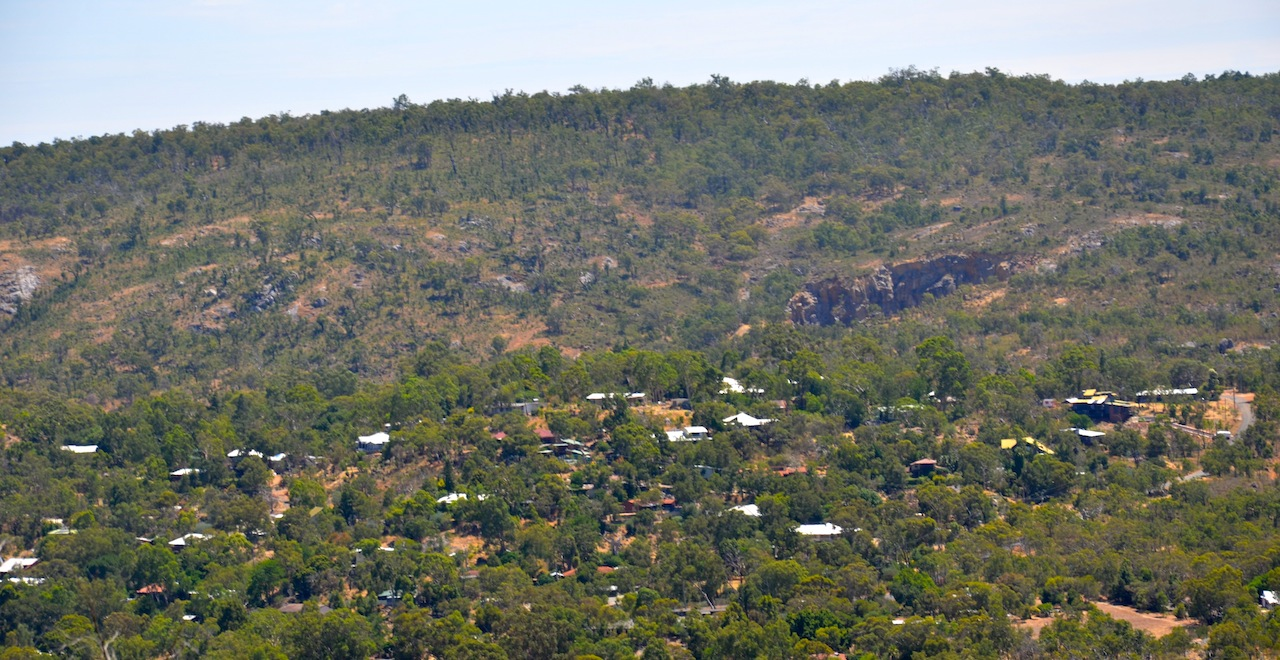
- Boya from the south, Mountain Quarry and Greenmount Hill behind
- Interactive map of Boya
- Coordinates: 31.914°S 116.056°E
- Country: Australia
- State: Western Australia
- City: Perth
- LGA: Shire of Mundaring

Government
  - State electorate: Midland
  - Federal division: Bullwinkel

Population
  - Total: 669 (SAL 2021)
- Postcode: 6056
Suburbs around Boya
Koongamia	Greenmount	Greenmount
Helena Valley	Boya	Darlington
Helena Valley	Helena Valley	Darlington

Boya is a locality on the Darling Scarp, in the Shire of Mundaring, Western Australia; it is on the south side of Greenmount Hill, and just west of Darlington.

The name of Boya is a local Noongar word meaning 'stone' or 'rock', and was imposed by government officials in the early twentieth century.

== Quarries ==
It was crucial as a site of quarries. The Mountain Quarry and the Government Quarry were both important blue stone quarries in their time.

The harbour and moles at Fremantle were built using stone from the Government Quarry.

The Government Quarry (on the south eastern part of the locality) was variously named during its time of operation as O'Connor's quarry, the Fremantle Harbour Works Darlington Quarry, the Public Works Quarry, the Government Quarry, and, currently, as Hudman Road Quarry.

Being at the edge of the Greenmount National Park and the Hudman Road Quarry, Boya has been subject to serious threatening bushfires spreading from these locations in recent years.

== Railway ==
In the history of the early Eastern Railway, which passed through Boya, Boya was the location of Cape Horn, a notorious curve at the 35-kilometre (22 mi) mark, where runaway trains derailed a number of times.

The community has a rich architectural variety of houses due to the challenge of steep and rocky blocks.

== Transport ==
=== Bus ===
- 322 Midland Station to Glen Forrest – serves Scott Street, Marriott Road and Coulston Road

== General references ==
- Elliot, Ian Mundaring – A History of the Shire. 1983 ISBN 0-9592776-0-9
- Spillman, Ken Life was meant to be here: community and local government in the Shire of Mundaring. 2003 ISBN 0-9592776-3-3
- Watson, Lindsay The railway history of Midland Junction. 1995 ISBN 0-646-24461-2
