= Koongamia, Western Australia =

Koongamia Perth, Western Australia
- Coordinates: 31.904°S 116.04°E
- Population: 985 (SAL 2021)
- Postcode(s): 6056
- LGA(s): City of Swan
- State electorate(s): Midland
- Federal division(s): Hasluck
Suburbs around Koongamia:
Bellevue	Bellevue	Bellevue
Bellevue	Koongamia	Boya
Helena Valley	Helena Valley	Boya

Koongamia /kʊŋɡəˈmaɪ.ə/ is a suburb of Perth, Western Australia, located in the City of Swan local government area.

The suburb was developed as a State Housing commission suburb, and had a brief time (1960-1962) as a location on the Perth metropolitan railway system, utilising a small portion uphill from Bellevue railway station on the track of the former Mundaring Loop railway line which was suspended since 1954 and had not been officially closed.

== Transport ==
=== Bus ===
- 322 Midland Station to Glen Forrest – serves Clayton Street, Jinda Road and Banjine Road
