= Wendy Barnes =

British overseas radio broadcaster (1916–2006)

Wendy Barnes MBE
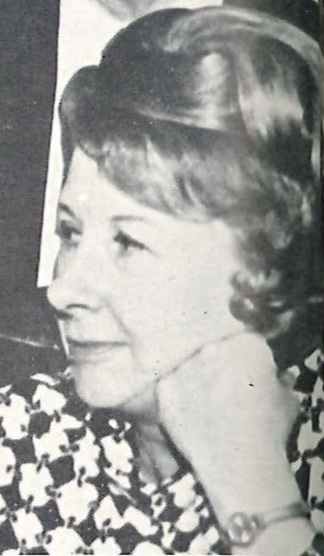
- Wendy Barnes at Time to Remember
- Born: Dorothy Wendy Barnes; 10 April 1916; London, England
- Died: 11 February 2006 (aged 89); Chipping Norton, Oxfordshire, England
- Spouse: William Orchard (m. 1995; died 1998)
- Presenting career
- Show: Time to Remember; Insight
- Stations: Forces Broadcasting Service; Kenya Broadcasting Corporation; Radio Hong Kong

Wendy Dorothy Orchard, MBE (Chinese: 班絲; 10 April 1916 – 11 February 2006), better known by her maiden name Wendy Barnes, was a British overseas radio broadcaster. From 1968 to 1974, she produced and hosted the talk show Time to Remember for Radio Hong Kong (RHK).

During her time at RHK, Barnes produced more than 200 episodes of Time to Remember. The programme featured interviews with personalities about their lives and their connections to the Far East, particularly Hong Kong. From 1971 onward, she also directed and hosted another popular current-affairs programme called Insight, which examined topical issues in depth. Later, she additionally served as RHK's Acting Controller of the English Service until she left in 1975.

Barnes began her broadcasting career with the British Broadcasting Corporation in 1942. Before joining RHK, she worked in broadcasting in London, Singapore, Vietnam, Egypt, Malta, Cyprus, and Kenya. She held positions including Station Controller of the Forces Broadcasting Service in Nairobi (1956–1959), Head of the English National Service of the Kenya Broadcasting Service (1959–1962), and, at the Kenya Broadcasting Corporation, Head of the General Service (1962–1963) and later Controller of the Television Programme Department (1963–1964).

After leaving RHK, Barnes returned to the United Kingdom and gradually withdrew from broadcasting. At 79, in 1995, she married William Orchard, a retiree at 73 who formerly served in the Hong Kong Government as an executive officer and later as a fisheries officer. She died in Chipping Norton, Oxfordshire, in 2006, at 89.

== Early life ==
Wendy Barnes was born on 10 April 1916 in London, United Kingdom. Her birth was registered as "Dorothy Wendy Barnes", although the name "Wendy Dorothy Barnes" appeared in later official records, including the Hong Kong Government Staff List and the 1976 New Year Honours List. She was more commonly known as "Wendy Barnes".

Barnes's father, John George Barnes, was an East Indian merchant, and her mother was Edith Denton. She was the second child in the family. Her elder brother was Colin Cardew Barnes, while her younger sister, Rosamond Edith Barnes, was a child actor and actress active mainly in the 1930s and 1940s. The family originally lived on Penn Road in Islington, London, and later moved to St Dunstan's Road in Fulham.

Before the Second World War, women in the United Kingdom generally had limited access to tertiary education. Even those who were better educated were typically offered clerical positions after leaving school. Roles requiring technical expertise or professional knowledge were largely held by men. According to the 1939 census, at 23, she was employed as a secretary at a film magazine.

== Early broadcasting career ==
After the outbreak of the Second World War in 1939, the United Kingdom's labour force underwent significant changes. With a substantial proportion of men called up for military service, the resulting labour shortages were increasingly alleviated by hiring women. Against this backdrop, the British Broadcasting Corporation (BBC) departed from its longstanding practice of not employing women, and in 1942 Barnes was recruited by the BBC as a programme engineer (effectively a production trainee) at Bush House in London. There, she learned on the job from the male colleagues who remained, and gradually acquired the knowledge and technical skills required for broadcasting. In her early years with the BBC, she worked primarily in the Home Service talks, light music and drama departments. Air raids became a daily routine in her working life.

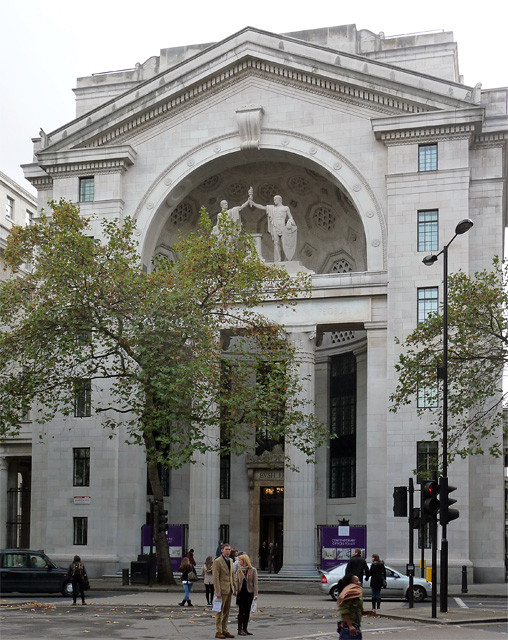
Wendy Barnes joined the BBC in 1942, initially working at its headquarters in Bush House, London (pictured).

After the war, Barnes, having spent four years at Bush House, moved to Singapore in 1946 to join the newly established British Far Eastern Broadcasting Service (BFEBS), operating under the auspices of the Foreign Office, where she again served as a programme engineer. At the time, the BFEBS and Radio Malaya were the two principal broadcasting services in British Malaya and Singapore. Radio Malaya, a government-run public service broadcaster, provided local programming, whereas the BFEBS primarily targeted non-English-speaking audiences across Southeast Asia. Its coverage extended to Burma, Siam (present-day Thailand), French Indochina (present-day Vietnam), and the Dutch East Indies (present-day Indonesia), with broadcasts transmitted in English, Cantonese, Mandarin, French, Siamese, Indonesian, Dutch, and Burmese.

In addition to her full-time role at the BFEBS, Barnes hosted a programme titled Listeners' Post on Radio Malaya. Broadcast mainly in the evenings and running for about an hour, the programme featured listener requests for contemporary music, including dance music, swing and jive. She also travelled to Saigon (present-day Ho Chi Minh City), then the capital of French Indochina, where she wrote scripts for the French Colonial Broadcasting Service. Her time there coincided with the First Indochina War. As the military conflicts between the French colonial authorities and the Democratic Republic of Vietnam, backed by the Indochinese Communist Party, intensified, insurgents made sporadic but unsuccessful attempts to blow up the broadcasting station where she worked.

In 1948, the BBC took over the BFEBS from the Foreign Office and significantly reduced its staffing and production scale. Due to the service cut, Barnes was redeployed by the Foreign Office to the British Embassy in Cairo, Egypt. Upon arrival, a shortage of hotel accommodation compelled her to live on a houseboat on the Nile. She remained in Cairo for about a year and, towards the end of her posting, was invited by Donald Maclean, then Counsellor at the Embassy, to serve as his secretary. However, she declined the offer as she thought that she had spent sufficient time in Cairo. In 1951, Maclean was exposed as a double agent for the United Kingdom and the Soviet Union, and defected to the Soviet Union in the same year.

In 1949, Barnes was transferred to Malta to work as a programme engineer at the Forces Broadcasting Service (FBS), marking her first appointment with the broadcaster. However, due to service reshuffle, FBS Malta was closed in 1951. As a result, Barnes was posted to FBS Cyprus, where she was promoted to programme organiser. The station was initially adjacent to a goat farm in the village of Lakatamia, southwest of the capital Nicosia. By this time, with nearly a decade of broadcasting experience, she was regarded by younger colleagues as a sort of elder sister and the font of broadcasting knowledge, though she was not immune to their pranks. On one occasion, while she was presenting a Christmas children's music programme in the studio, two young male colleagues pushed a goat into the studio, causing it to leap about. Barnes was startled by the prank and was forced to halt the broadcast. In 1952, a fire destroyed the Lakatamia station, and the staff members, including Barnes, were relocated to new premises in Nicosia to recommence broadcasting service.

== Kenya years ==
In 1954, Wendy Barnes was transferred to FBS Nairobi, Kenya, where she continued as programme organiser and was promoted to Station Controller in 1956. During her first two years in Kenya, she experienced the Mau Mau rebellion firsthand and had to remain constantly alert to the threat of attacks by anti-colonial insurgents in both her daily life and work. After the rebellion was suppressed by 1956, FBS Nairobi entered a period of expanded development under her management. One example of this progress was in December 1957, when Five Way Family Favourites, a radio programme for service men and women stationed abroad and their families at home in the United Kingdom, was broadcast to celebrate Christmas. Barnes served as the Nairobi presenter, joining counterparts from London, Cologne (West Germany), Cyprus and Malta.

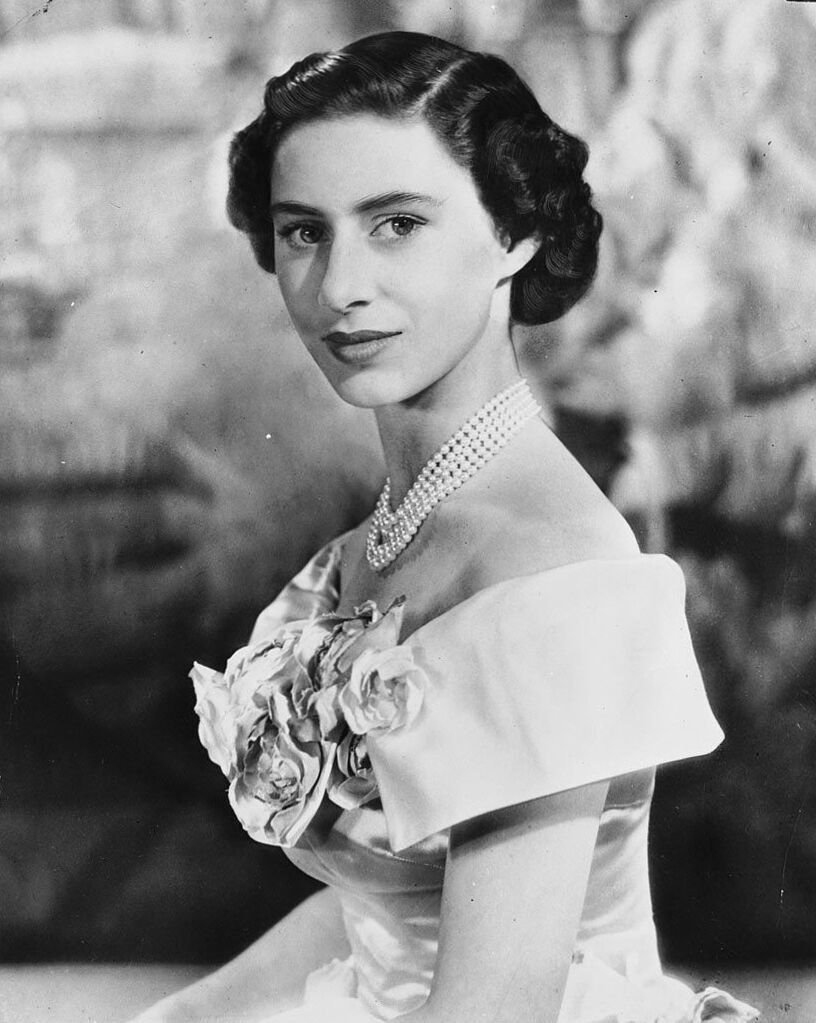
In October 1956, Wendy Barnes interviewed Princess Margaret (pictured) during her royal visit to Kenya.

After the Mau Mau rebellion subsided, visitor numbers to Kenya gradually increased, contributing to a more vibrant social life in Nairobi. As Station Controller, Barnes began interviewing visiting politicians, film stars, entertainers, and even members of the royal family. Among them was American actress Joan Crawford, who visited in 1956. However, her work as an interviewer was not without setbacks. In October 1956, she was scheduled to interview Princess Margaret during her royal visit to East Africa, with the programme planned as a live broadcast from a garden party at Government House. The Princess, however, was unwell and arrived 40 minutes late, leaving Barnes to fill the airtime alone, "adlibbing desperately", just as rain began to fall. Barnes later recalled the episode as a "rather agonising incident" and "something of a broadcaster's nightmare".

In 1958, the Kenyan colonial government established the Kenya Broadcasting Service (KBS) as a government department. The following year, it formally assumed responsibility for public radio broadcasting from Cable and Wireless Limited and the government's Department of Information, covering services in English, Swahili, Asian and many African vernacular languages. This consolidation made the government-run KBS the dominant broadcaster in Kenya. Following the takeover, the KBS was organised into four channels, namely the English National Service, the Asian National Service, the African National Service and the Regional Services. Barnes, who had been Station Controller of FBS Nairobi, joined the KBS in 1959 as Head of the English National Service, bringing to a close about a decade of service with the FBS. When she joined the KBS, the newspapers credited her with having made FBS Nairobi "one of the liveliest programmes in Africa".

Due to her love to listen to other people's stories, Barnes began producing and hosting a talk programme called A Time to Remember while she was head of KBS English National Service. Guided by her belief that "everyone has a story, if only you can draw it out of them", the programme featured interviews with individuals connected to Kenya and East Africa to revisit their lives and experiences. It soon gained popularity in Kenya and across East Africa. On one occasion, an elderly European couple who lived in rural Uganda made a trip to Nairobi, Kenya, to visit the KBS station. It turned out that they were longtime listeners of A Time to Remember and finally got to share their story with Barnes on the programme. Although Barnes later moved on to other roles, the African staff who succeeded her continued producing and hosting the programme.

A few years later in 1962, the KBS was separated from the colonial government and was reorganised, based on the BBC model, into a public corporation known as the Kenya Broadcasting Corporation (KBC), in preparation for Kenya's independence from the United Kingdom in 1963. Under this reorganisation, the former English National Service became the General Service, which Barnes continued to head. In 1963, Barnes transferred to the newly established Television Programme Department as Controller, where she was responsible for developing Kenya's newly introduced television broadcasting service. However, on the eve of Kenya's transition to a republic in 1964, the KBC was nationalised by the government and became the Voice of Kenya (VoK). As Barnes did not join the new broadcaster, her decade-long career in Kenya came to an end.

== Radio Hong Kong ==
Two years after returning from Kenya to the United Kingdom, Wendy Barnes was appointed in September 1966 as a programme supervisor at Radio Hong Kong (RHK), the predecessor of Radio Television Hong Kong (RTHK). Like the former KBS, RHK was a government department operating as a public broadcaster under the Hong Kong Government. She arrived in Hong Kong the following year to take up the post. This was not her first visit to the territory. In 1961, she had travelled from Nairobi to Hong Kong, spending four days in the colony producing a programme to promote tourism between Kenya and the Far East. Having lived in Kenya for a considerable period, she was also elected president of the East African Association (also known as the Jambo Club), an organisation formed by Hong Kong residents with an interest in East African affairs, in 1968.

At RHK, she produced and hosted more than 200 episodes of Time to Remember from 1968 to 1974. The programme was mainly broadcast on Sunday evenings on the English Service, and each episode ran about 45 to 50 minutes. Compared with the Kenyan version, most guests on the Hong Kong version were older Hong Kong residents, government officials and business figures about to leave Hong Kong, visitors with deep ties to Hong Kong, China, and the Far East, as well as others who happened to be visiting Hong Kong for various reasons. Examples of notable guests included the 24th Governor of Hong Kong, Sir David Trench, Urban Council member Elsie Elliott, ballerina Dame Margot Fonteyn, and Sir Yuet-keung Kan, chairman of the Bank of East Asia and unofficial member of the Executive Council.

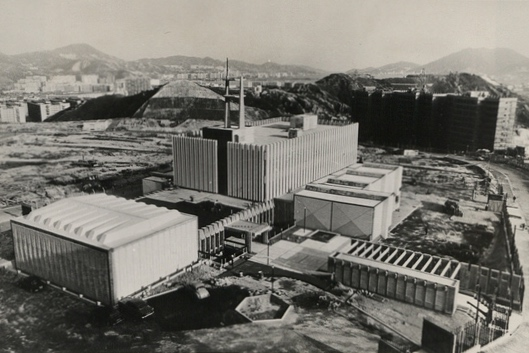
Radio Hong Kong moved into its new headquarters at the Broadcasting House on Broadcast Drive in Kowloon, in 1969 (pictured).

For more than six years on air, Time to Remember was one of RHK's most popular English-language programmes. Peter Gynt, the television and radio critic for the South China Morning Post, wrote more than once in praise of Barnes and her programme. He described her as "the finest radio producer outside the BBC", and said her "questions are carefully thought out and so we get a glimpse into the mind and background of people who are, for one reason or another, in the public eye". Her "thrusting" interview style never bored listeners and successfully "obtained for her programme just what she wanted, and how she wanted it" from her guests. The success of the programme even led journalist and writer Trea Wiltshire to interview Barnes in return, to review her broadcasting career. The interview was titled "A woman with a lifetime to remember..." and appeared in the South China Morning Post on 22 September 1968, with Wiltshire jokingly noting that "Today it is her Time to Remember".

Apart from Time to Remember, Barnes began directing and hosting a new current-affairs programme for RHK's Public Affairs Unit called Insight in May 1971. At first, the programme could be heard every Sunday and Wednesday evenings on the English Service, and later it moved to weekends. Each episode offered an in-depth examination of a current topical issue and included interviews, discussions, on the spot commentary, and detailed background information. The programme covered a wide range of current-affairs topics during her time. Examples included increased school fees, freedom of the press, the introduction of "off course betting" by the Royal Hong Kong Jockey Club, drug taking amongst the young, the Hong Kong Stock Exchange, rise in rents, the future development of Lantau, traffic problems, consumer protection, workers and conditions in factories, the establishment of the Independent Commission Against Corruption, misleading advertisements, the dangers of plastic surgery, abortion law and sex education in Hong Kong, as well as international issues such as devaluation of the US Dollars and the Common Market, among others. After its launch, Insight quickly "established itself an authoritative and well documented programme". During the February 1974 United Kingdom general election, it even mounted a 24-hour marathon coverage on 1 March, the day after polling, closely following the voting and vote-counting process. The coverage featured "up-to-the-minute" news reports interspersed with live comments from observers in both the United Kingdom and Hong Kong, enabling local listeners to keep abreast of the latest political developments in the United Kingdom alongside a range of informed analysis.

In 1973, Barnes began serving as an acting senior programme supervisor, which required her to take on a broader range of duties. When her direct supervisor, Geoffrey Weeks, Controller of the English Service, was on leave, she also acted in that capacity. Following Weeks's sudden death in September 1974, Barnes was immediately and substantially promoted to senior programme supervisor, and concurrently appointed Acting Controller of the English Service on a permanent basis. These changes brought her even heavier responsibilities. Due to production difficulties, Time to Remember went off the air in July 1974, but Barnes continued to produce and host Insight. In addition, when Queen Elizabeth II made her first royal visit to Hong Kong in May 1975, she was the chief commentator for the live broadcast on the English Service (i.e. RHK3 and RHK4) to cover the welcoming ceremony at the Hong Kong City Hall on the Queen's arrival with the Duke of Edinburgh on 4 May.

Shortly after the live radio broadcast covering the Queen's royal visit in May 1975, Barnes returned to the United Kingdom for a six-month annual leave. Although she had originally intended to remain at RHK until reaching the retirement age of 60 in 1976, news emerged in July 1975 that she had already tendered her resignation directly from the United Kingdom, having accepted an offer from the BBC and decided to remain there.

Following her departure, the position of Acting Controller of the English Service was filled by Warren Rooke, then acting senior programme supervisor, until February 1976. At that time, RHK created a new post of Controller of Radio Programmes under the Director, Deputy Director, and Assistant Director of Broadcasting to oversee both the Chinese and English Radio Services. Ken Warburton of the BBC was recruited from the United Kingdom to assume this role, and the title of Controller of the English Service was consequently revised to Deputy Controller (English Service).

In recognition of her decade-long service with RHK, Barnes was appointed a Member of the Order of the British Empire (MBE) in the 1976 New Year Honours List. The citation noted that "Her extensive broadcasting experience and great ability were used to create the highest standards in Radio Hong Kong's radio and television public affairs programmes".

== Later life ==
After returning to the United Kingdom in 1975, Wendy Barnes gradually withdrew from broadcasting and settled in London. In 1995, at the age of 79, she married William Orchard, then 73, in London; both had been victims of the infamous 1985 Hong Kong stockbroker fraud case orchestrated by Peter Scales. Orchard, whose parents were from the United Kingdom, was born in Hong Kong in 1922. He joined the Hong Kong Government as a civil servant in 1940, took part in the Battle of Hong Kong in 1941, and after the war, returned to the civil service, where he served as an executive officer, class I, and later as a senior executive officer, class II, also acting as the Commissioner of Registration. He was subsequently transferred to the Agriculture and Fisheries Department in 1955, where he became a fisheries officer until taking early retirement in April 1975. Orchard married his first wife in the United Kingdom in 1946, and the previous marriage produced two daughters.

Orchard died in London in 1998 at the age of 75, three years after their wedding. After her husband's death, Barnes moved to Chipping Norton, Oxfordshire to live nearer to her sister Rosamond. After Rosamond died in 2003, Barnes continued to reside in Chipping Norton until her own death there on 11 February 2006, at the age of 89.

== See also ==
- BBC
- British Forces Broadcasting Service
- Kenya Broadcasting Corporation
- Radio Television Hong Kong

Government offices
Preceded by Ian Woolf	Station Controller of FBS Nairobi; 1956年–1959年	Succeeded by Pat Pachebat
Preceded by Geoffrey Weeks	Acting Controller of the English Service, RHK; September 1974 - May 1975	Succeeded by Warren Rooke (Acting)
