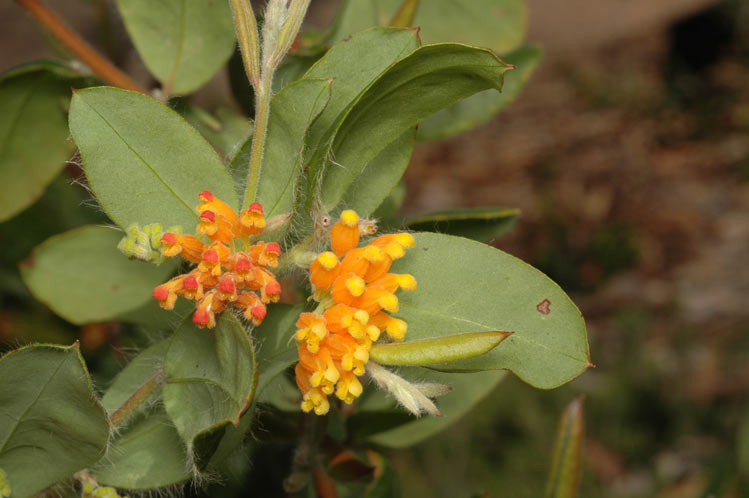

Conservation status
- Priority Four — Rare Taxa (DEC)

Scientific classification
- Kingdom: Plantae
- Clade: Tracheophytes
- Clade: Angiosperms
- Clade: Eudicots
- Order: Proteales
- Family: Proteaceae
- Genus: Grevillea
- Species: G. pimeleoides

Binomial name
- Grevillea pimeleoides W.Fitzg.

Synonyms
- Grevillea drummondii subsp. pimeleoides (W.Fitzg.) McGill.

= Grevillea pimeleoides =

Species of shrub endemic to Western Australia

Grevillea pimeleoides is a species of flowering plant in the family Proteaceae and is endemic to the south-west of Western Australia. It is an erect shrub with elliptic to egg-shaped leaves with the narrower end towards the base, and clusters of yellow or orange flowers.

== Description ==
Grevillea pimeleoides is a robust, erect shrub that typically grows to a height of 0.6–2.5 m (2 ft 0 in – 8 ft 2 in) and does not form a lignotuber. Its leaves are elliptic to egg-shaped with the narrower end towards the base, 20–65 mm (0.79–2.56 in) long, 7–20 mm (0.28–0.79 in) wide and glabrous, apart from a few hairs on the upper surface. The flowers are arranged in clusters of 13 to 18 on one side of a rachis 1–2 mm (0.039–0.079 in) long and are light orange in the bud stage, yellow as the flowers open, then orange again, the end of the style yellow, turning red, the pistil usually 7–8 mm (0.28–0.31 in) long. Flowering occurs from July to November and the fruit is an oval follicle about 15 mm (0.59 in) long.

== Taxonomy ==
Grevillea pimeleoides was first formally described in 1902 by William Vincent Fitzgerald in the Journal and Proceedings of the Mueller Botanic Society of Western Australia from specimens he collected in 1901 from a "rocky spot on [a] hill-side between Smith's Mill and Helena River". The specific epithet (pimeleoides) means "Pimelea-like".

== Distribution and habitat ==
This grevillea grows in forest or woodland with a shrubby understorey and occurs in the Helena and Canning River areas in the Jarrah Forest and Swan Coastal Plain bioregions of south-western Western Australia.

== Conservation status ==
Grevillea pimeleoides is listed as "Priority Four" by the Government of Western Australia Department of Biodiversity, Conservation and Attractions, meaning that it is rare or near threatened.
