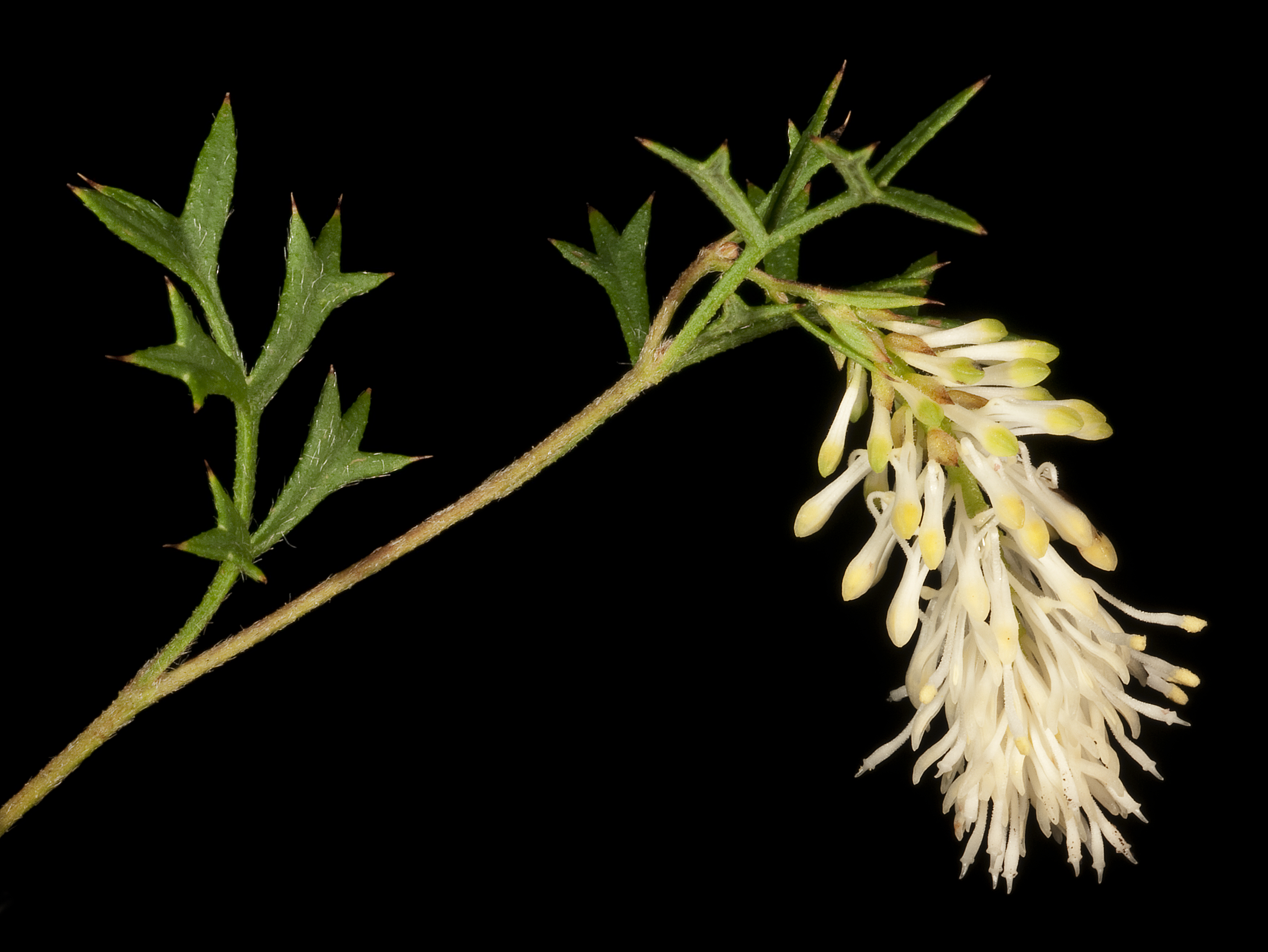

Scientific classification
- Kingdom: Plantae
- Clade: Tracheophytes
- Clade: Angiosperms
- Clade: Eudicots
- Order: Proteales
- Family: Proteaceae
- Genus: Grevillea
- Species: G. pulchella

Binomial name
- Grevillea pulchella (R.Br.) Meisn.

Synonyms
- Anadenia pulchella R.Br.

= Grevillea pulchella =

Species of shrub endemic to Western Australia

Grevillea pulchella, commonly known as beautiful grevillea, is a species of flowering plant in the family Proteaceae and is endemic to the southwest of Western Australia. It is a spreading shrub usually with pinnatisect leaves, and cylindrical clusters of white to cream-coloured flowers.

== Description ==
Grevillea pulchella is a spreading shrub that typically grows to a height of 0.2–1.5 m (7.9 in – 4 ft 11.1 in). Its leaves are 20–75 mm (0.79–2.95 in) long, 10–50 mm (0.39–1.97 in) wide and usually pinnatisect with 5 to 19 lobes, each further divided with 3 to 5 triangular or linear lobes 2–18 mm (0.079–0.709 in) long and 1.5–7 mm (0.059–0.276 in) wide. The edges of the leaves are turned down or rolled under, the lower surface usually with a few soft hairs. The flowers are arranged on the ends of branches or in upper leaf axils in cylindrical to oval clusters 15–45 mm (0.59–1.77 in) long, the flowers at the base of the cluster opening first. The flowers are white to cream-coloured, the pistil 5–8.5 mm (0.20–0.33 in) long. Flowering mainly occurs from June to December and the fruit is a glabrous but sticky follicle 5.5–9 mm (0.22–0.35 in) long.

== Taxonomy ==
This species was first formally described in 1810 by Robert Brown who gave it the name Anadenia pulchella in Transactions of the Linnean Society of London. In 1845, Carl Meissner changed the name to Grevillea pulchella in Johann Georg Christian Lehmann's Plantae Preissianae. The specific epithet (pulchella) means "beautiful and small".

== Distribution and habitat ==
Beautiful grevillea grows in variety of soils, on laterite or granite and occurs from Busselton to Manjimup and Albany, in the Stirling Range, and from the Helena River to Narrogin in the south-west of Western Australia.
