= The Boy in the Bush =

1924 novel by D. H. Lawrence and Mollie Skinner

First US edition (publ. Thomas Seltzer, 1924)

The Boy in the Bush is a novel by D. H. Lawrence set in Western Australia, first published in 1924. It is derived from a story in a manuscript given to Lawrence by Mollie Skinner, entitled The House of Ellis. The title page of the first edition gives "D. H. Lawrence and M. L. Skinner" equal billing as its authors. Lawrence and his wife Frieda stayed with Skinner at her guesthouse in Darlington, Western Australia in 1922.

== Australian television production ==
The Boy in the Bush
- Based on: The Boy in the Bush by D.H. Lawrence
- Written by: Hugh Whitemore
- Directed by: Rob Stewart
- Starring: Kenneth Branagh; Sigrid Thornton; Steve Bisley; Jon Blake
- Countries of origin: Australia; United Kingdom
- Original language: English
- No. of episodes: 2 x 2 hours

Production
- Producers: Ian Walker; Geoffrey Daniels

Original release
- Network: ABC; Channel 4
- Release: 11 March 1984

The Boy in the Bush was made into a television miniseries in 1984, directed by Rob Stewart and starring Kenneth Branagh and Sigrid Thornton.

It was one of five co-productions between the ABC and Portman Productions.

=== Cast ===
- Kenneth Branagh as Jack Grant
- Sigrid Thornton as Monica Ellis
- Steve Bisley as Esau
- Jon Blake as Tom Ellis

== Standard edition ==
Lawrence, D. H. (1924). Paul Eggert (ed.). The Boy in the Bush. Cambridge University Press.
