= Darlington Arts Festival =

Annual festival in Darlington, Western Australia

Coordinates: 31°55′04″S 116°04′29″E

Darlington Arts Festival is a festival held annually in Darlington, Western Australia.

The origins of the festival were in the 1950s, spawned from the relationship between the artists resident in Darlington and the local voluntary community fire brigade.

It has been claimed to be one of the longest lasting community festivals in Perth, Western Australia.

The festival includes an art exhibition in the local historic Darlington Hall and a fair on the adjacent cricket oval. The art exhibition has been the showcase of many new artists over the decades - from Darlington and elsewhere.

Some reviewing of the event over time enjoys the foibles of the event.

Many posters, promotional items and catalogues reflect the nature of the community, as well as showcasing some more notable artists and their legacies.

Committee membership evolves with the community changes, however one of the longest serving members was Sally Herzfeld. In 2020 a history was published, by the Darlington History Group and written by Trea Wiltshire, editor of the Darlington Review.

The 2020 text concentrated on notable public figures, artists and writers associated with Darlington over time including:

- William Boissevain
- David Gregson
- Guy Grey-Smith
- George Haynes
- Amy Heap
- Claude Hotchin
- Robert Juniper
- Hal Missingham
- Philippa O'Brien
- Katharine Susannah Prichard
- Mollie Skinner
- Richard Woldendorp
