= Lower Helena Pipehead Dam =

Dam in Western Australia

Coordinates: 31.942083°S 116.076509°E

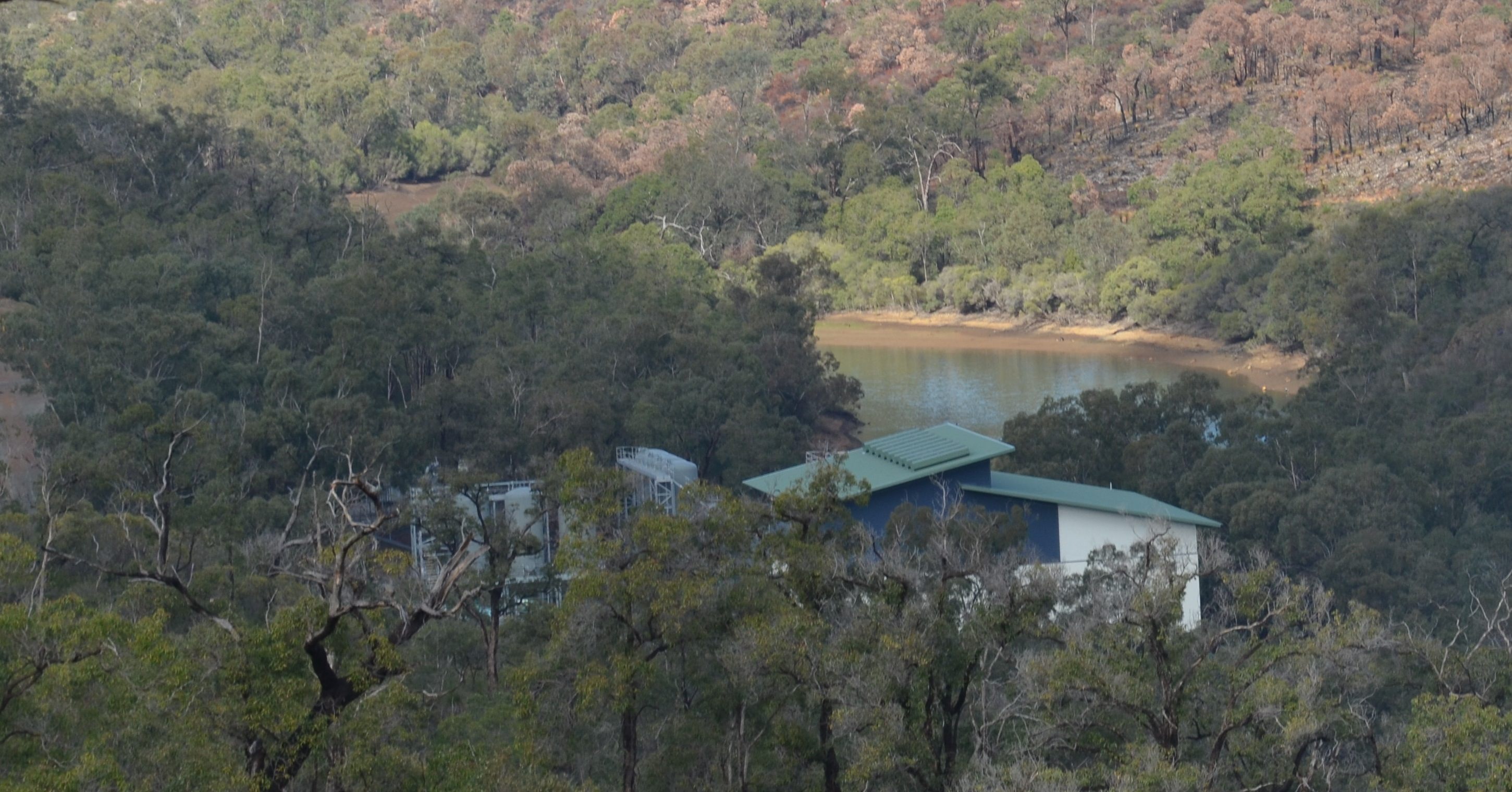
Looking from the north west at buildings and water

The Lower Helena Pipehead Dam, also known as the Lower Helena Pumpback Dam, catchment and pipeline are a part of the Goldfields Water Supply operations at Mundaring Weir, some distance east in the same valley, in the Darling Range in Western Australia.

The suburb Helena Valley is a few kilometres downstream of the dam.

The dam was first constructed in the early 1970s, on the Helena River at a location on the southern boundary of the suburb of Darlington.

By the 1980s and 1990s, the catchment and water quality saw a number of studies and reports.

Into the 2000s, further research continued, and the upper parts of the catchment area were being considered as restricted activity zones.
