= Darlington Review =

Community newspaper in Darlington, Western Australia

Darlington Review is the local monthly newspaper for Darlington, Western Australia. It is possibly one of the longest lasting community newspapers of its sort in Western Australia, having commenced in 1954.

There were a number of Darlington newspapers in the early 1950s, but they resolved to the one newspaper.

In the early 1950s most issues had limited editorial comment, but would include gardening notes, petrol station roster times, and community notes. Most articles were very short and advertising was limited. Also there were welcome notes to new residents, who were named.

Earlier "social gossip" about Darlington was published in The Western Mail in the 1930s, but in the Review in the 1950s gossip was sparse. Various groups and associations put in brief articles.

The Review had a preponderance of retired army majors involved with Gestetner produced editions, and the editors and logo changed fairly regularly until the long-standing editorial position of Trea Wiltshire, being the longest serving editor for the Review.

Other magazines have existed in the Perth Hills - most for a much shorter duration:

- Hills Gazette (1973-1990)
- Mundaring Magazine (2001-2006)

The Review is one of the sponsors of the Darlington Arts Festival, and the Darlington Village website.
