= Darlington Hall =

Hall in Darlington, Western Australia

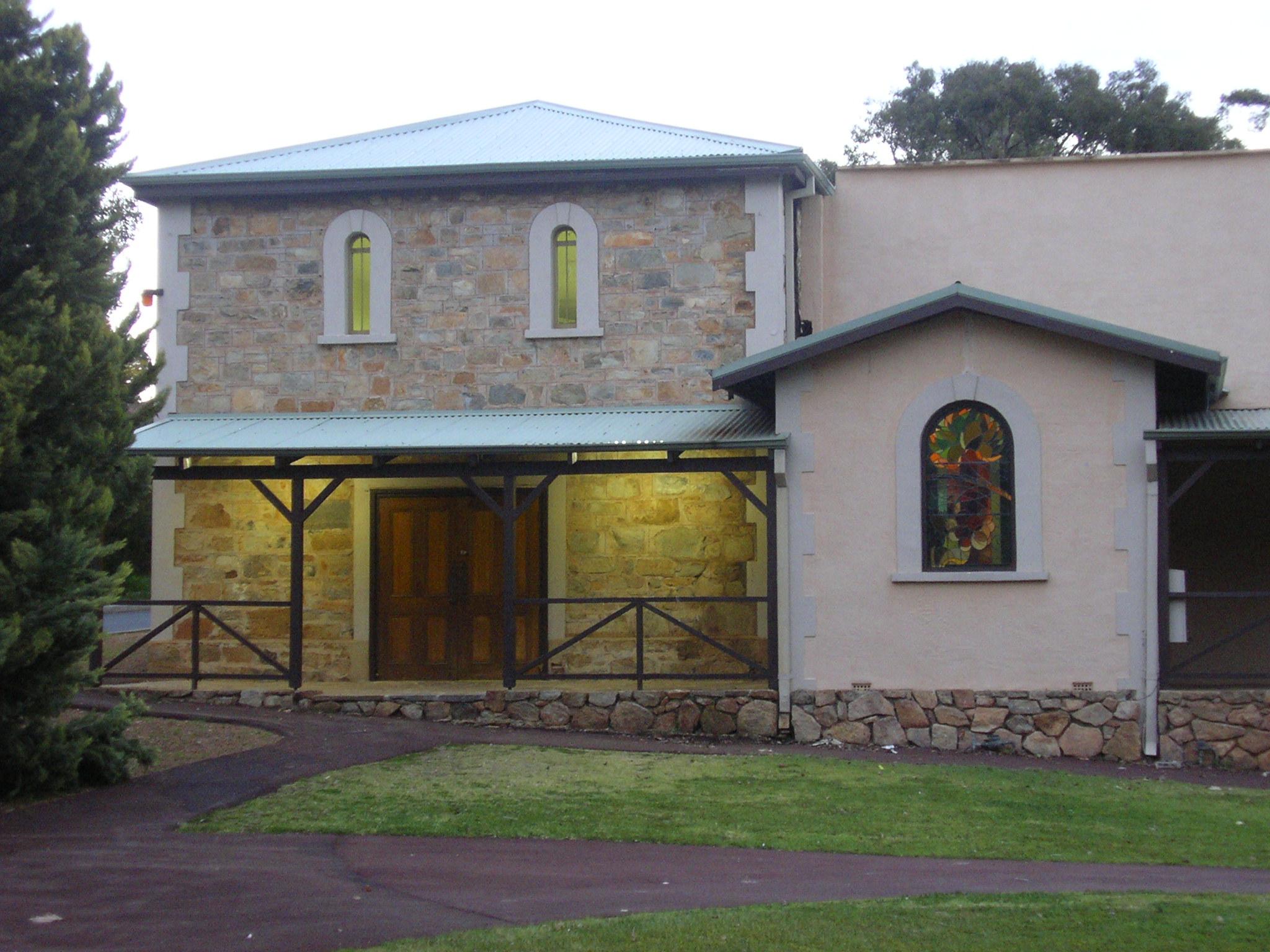
- Darlington Hall from north in 2007

- Location within Perth
- Former names: Darlington Vineyard Cellars

General information
- Type: Village hall
- Coordinates: 31.9182°S 116.0748°E
- Completed: 1890

Darlington Hall is a heritage listed building in Darlington, Western Australia.

== History ==
The original structure was a build for the nineteenth century Darlington Winery in 1890 for Alfred Waylen and Josceline Amherst.

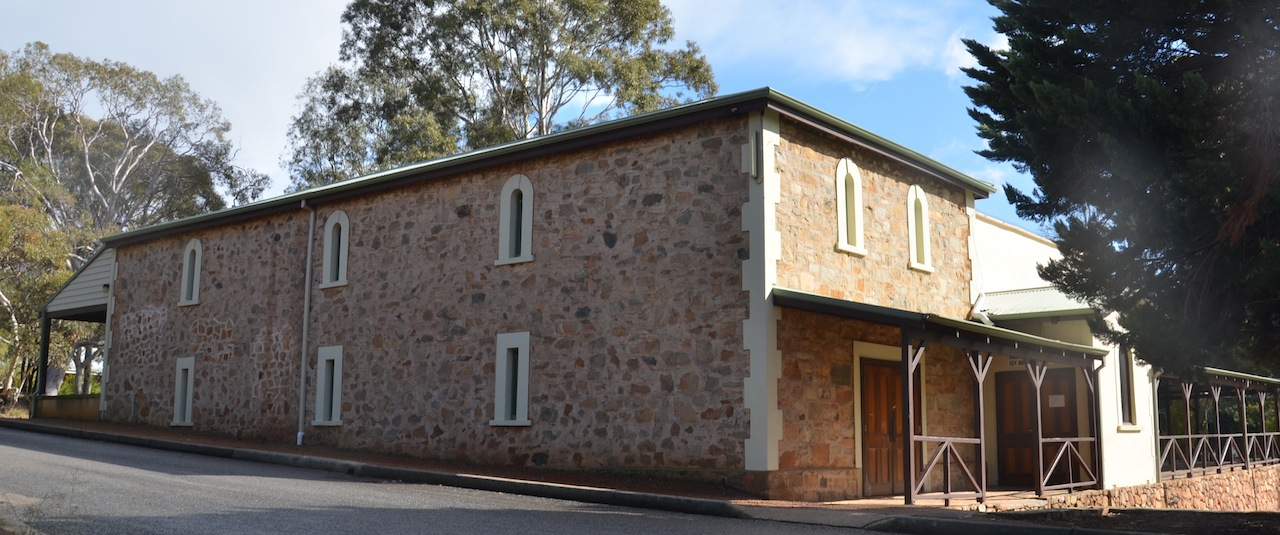
From north east in 2017

It was renovated a number of times over the years.

It is now called Darlington Hall, and a part is home to the Darlington Club. The building is registered with the Heritage Council of Western Australia.

The original structure is known as the lesser hall, while the more recent larger section on the west side is the main hall.

== Current uses ==
A large number of local groups and people have used the space for meetings and private events. The Darlington Theatre players (now the Marloo Theatre) had their first plays performed in the hall, and it hosts the art exhibition of the annual Darlington Arts Festival.

The hall has been used by the Darlington Progress Association (now the Darlington Rate Payers Association) since the 1920s.

It has been the location of the annual Darlington Concerts – also known as the Darlington Chamber Music Series.
