= Trea Wiltshire =

Journalist and writer from Western Australia

Trea Wiltshire is a Western Australian based writer.

She has worked at University of Western Australia in its publication Uniview.

== Hong Kong ==
She had lived in and written books about Hong Kong:

- (1971) Hong Kong; an impossible journey through history
- (1989) Old Hong Kong
- (1991) Echoes of Old China
- (1991) Hong Kong: last prize of empire
- (1993) Saturday's child
- (1995) Encounters with China
- (1997) Old Hong Kong (5th edition)
- (1997) Old Hong Kong: 1860 - 30 June 1997
- (1997) Hong Kong: the last prize of empire (4th edition)
- (2005) Hong Kong: pages from the past
- (2017) A Stroll through Old Hong Kong

and about China:

- (1995) Encounters with China
- (2001) A street in China
- (2004) Echoes of old China (3rd edition)

Related items:

- (1973) Bali
- (2003) Angkor
- (2006) Bamboo

== Darlington, Western Australia ==
She lives in Darlington, Western Australia, and has written about the history of the locality, as well as the primary school and the Darlington Arts Festival. She has been the longest duration editor of the Darlington Review.

In Western Australia she has also written about a number of popular tourist destinations, including Rottnest Island and Margaret River.
