= Nyaania Creek =

Seasonal creek in Western Australia

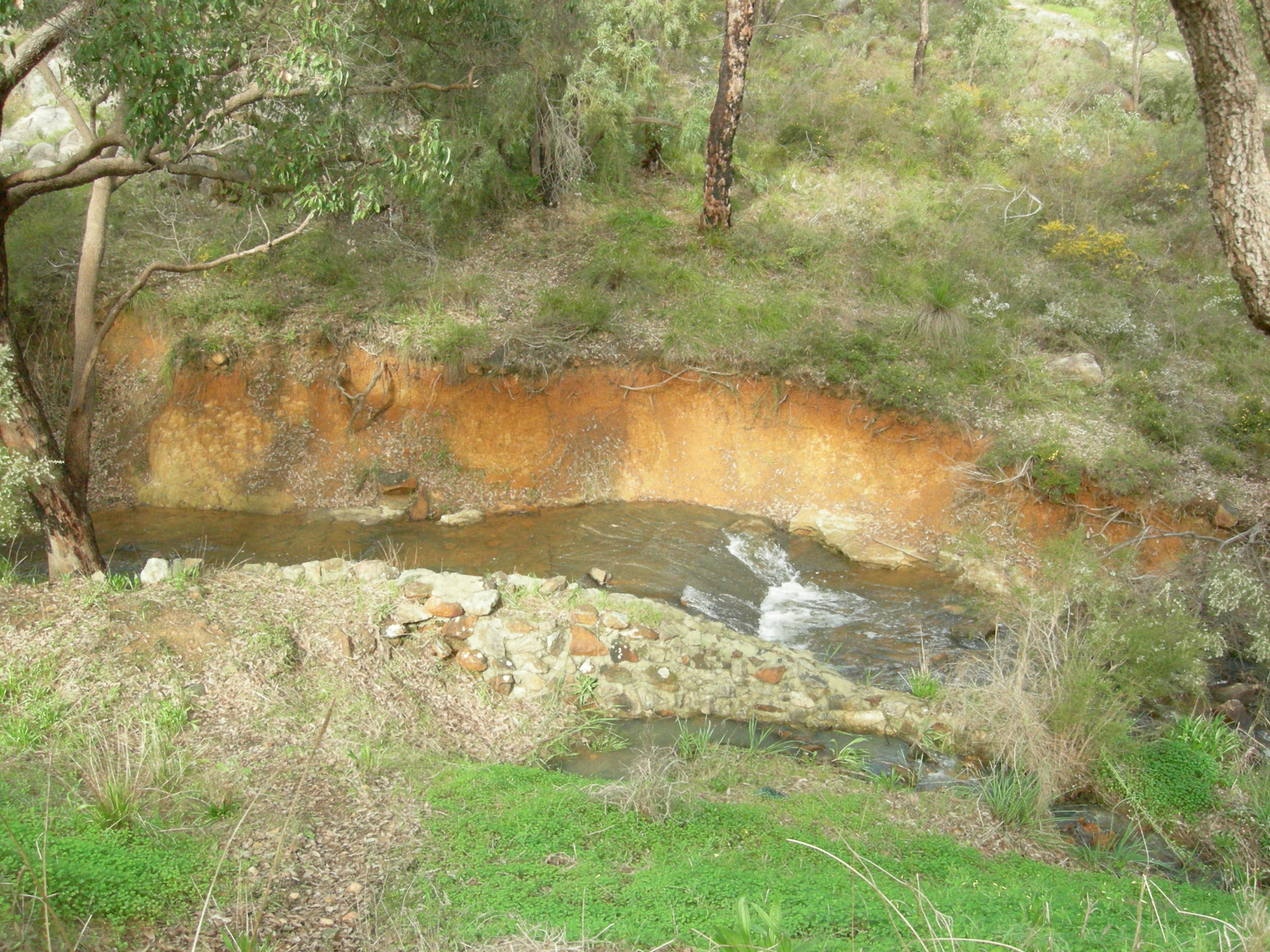
Part of the diverted Nyaania creek on the south side of the Eastern railway as it moves from Darlington to Glen Forrest near the 'Devils Terror' area of the original rail workings

Nyaania Creek (31°55′S 116°03′E) is a creek in Western Australia. (Note: Nyaania was also a stopping place and locality name at 31°54′S 116°06′E, associated with the first route of the Eastern Railway between Bellevue and Mundaring in Western Australia.) It is a seasonal tributary that flows into the Helena River with a catchment that moves through a number of hills suburbs just east of the Darling Scarp. Its source is in Mahogany Creek, and it flows through Glen Forrest, Darlington, and Boya before meeting the Helena River at Helena Valley.

It was originally known as the Smiths Mill Brook on maps between 1902 and 1920. In the 1920s it became known as Nyaania Brook, and in 1945 it officially took the current name.

Its importance stems from the fact that it flows through private land for most of its length, linked to issues that affect watercourses in the Darling Scarp region:

- usages of herbicides and other contaminants that can become waterborne
- excess nutrients from fertilisers used in domestic gardens
- inappropriate exotic weeds that flourish in difficult to access locations

It has significant areas of reserves either adjacent, or within 100 metres (330 ft) either side of its main creek bed. It runs in a number of places along what was rail reserve of the Eastern Railway – which is now the southern part of the Railway Reserve Heritage Trail.

== Upper reaches ==
The creek is small in size and width and moves through numerous private properties.

The upper portion of the creek has the Strettle Road Reserve on its north side – which is at the west end of Mahogany Creek which although completely a regenerated plot of land following extensive firing and logging in the last hundred years is a significant reserve.

Near the ex-Statham quarry in Glen Forrest it enters into its first reserve, the Thomas Park reserve.

In Glen Forrest the Glen Forrest Super Block is on its south side just prior to the border with Darlington and near Devil's Terror.

== Devil's Terror Springs ==
Historically it achieved its significance in the construction of the Eastern Railway where a surveyed route of the railway encountered difficulties with the creek and creek bed. As a cutting was being constructed (near the bottom of Dalry Road) clay was struck followed by an underground stream which flooded the clay and turned it into a bottomless bog. The locality earned the name in the Perth newspapers of the 1880s as The Devil's Terror and they cite the example of workers sinking in mud.

That section of the railway had to be resurveyed and was shifted 100 metres (330 ft) south along the bed of Nyaania creek. The creek above Glen Forrest was diverted into Chittawarra Brook while a dam was thrown across the creek just to the west of Glen Forrest to hold back the water while a man made channel was built to replace the original creek bed. On completion of the channel the dam wall was breached and Nyaania Creek was allowed to run into the new channel. As a result of this construction the creek bed now runs along the top of the 3-to-5-metre-deep (9.8 to 16.4 ft) cutting. In winter the water can be heard rushing just above ones head as they walk through the cutting.

For the duration of the Eastern Railway route usage (1880s to 1953) the Nyaania Creek/Eastern Railway/Devil's Terror location point of coincidence has had springs under or next to the railway line. The sleepers and rails were removed in the mid-1960s, and ever since they have subsisted even when the Nyaania Creek is dry in the middle of a drought. Many users of the subsequent Railway Reserve Heritage Trail have had a particular attraction to their persistence.

== Lower reaches ==
Having passed through the built up area of Darlington it proceeds into a steep valley south of the riding school in Glen Road, and enters Helena River in Helena Valley.

== Rehabilitation ==
In the 2000s surrounding bushland was focused as rehabilitation areas.

== General references ==
- Elliot, Ian (1983). Mundaring - A History of the Shire (2nd ed.). Mundaring: Mundaring Shire. ISBN 0-9592776-0-9.
- Watson, Lindsay (1995). The railway history of Midland Junction. ISBN 0-646-24461-2.
