= Glen Forrest, Western Australia =

Glen Forrest
- Suburb
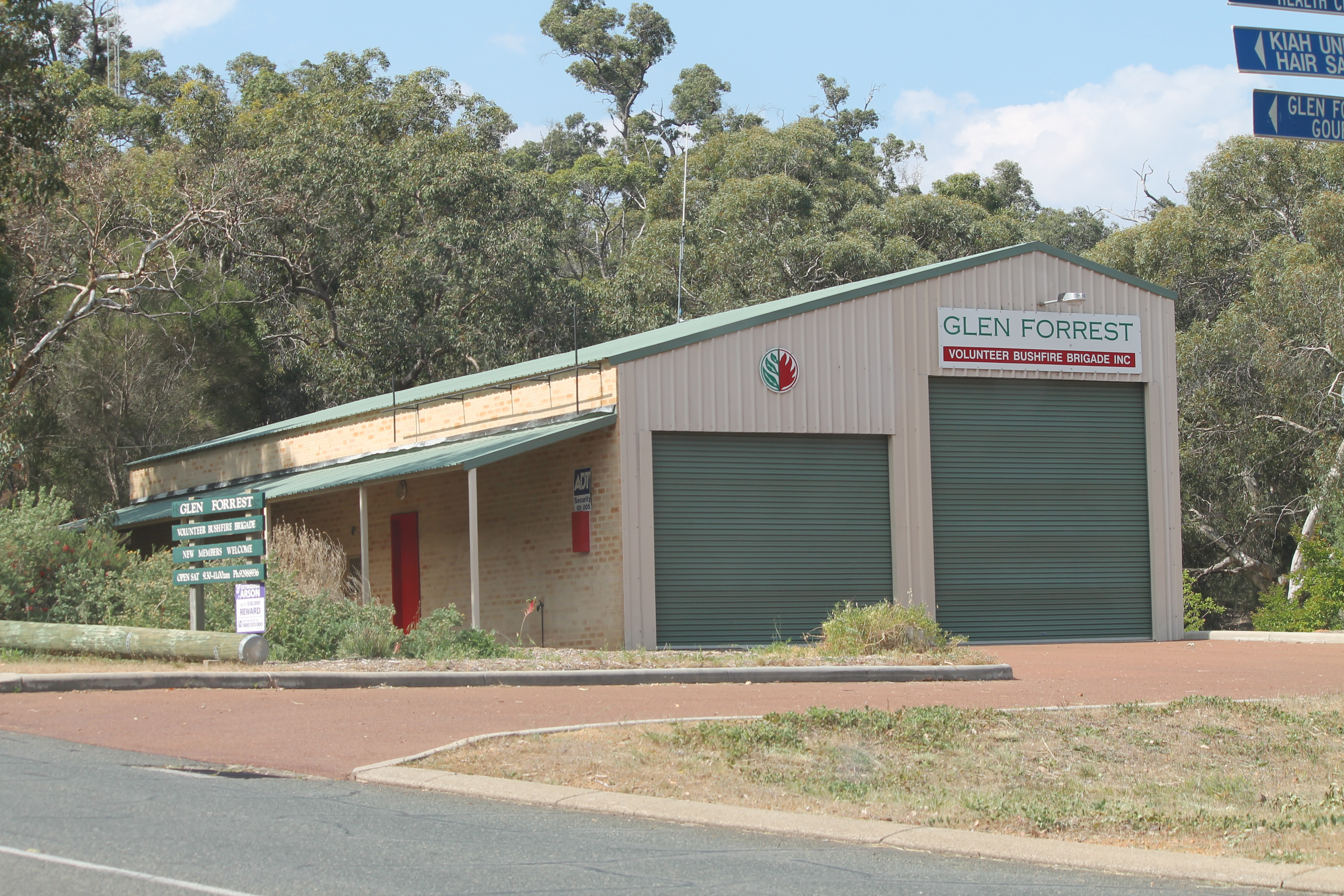
- The Glen Forrest Volunteer Fire Brigade building in 2012
- Interactive map of Glen Forrest
- Coordinates: 31.910°S 116.103°E
- Country: Australia
- State: Western Australia
- City: Perth
- LGA: Shire of Mundaring
- Established: 1877

Government
  - State electorate: Swan Hills
  - Federal division: Bullwinkel

Population
  - Total: 2,789 (SAL 2021)
- Postcode: 6071
Suburbs around Glen Forrest
Hovea	Hovea	Hovea
Darlington	Glen Forrest	Mahogany Creek
Darlington	Paulls Valley	Paulls Valley

Glen Forrest is a suburb within the Shire of Mundaring, south of John Forrest National Park, west of Mahogany Creek, east of Darlington, and north of the Helena River. Its northern boundary is determined by the Great Eastern Highway.

The area was originally named Smith's Mill, after A. C. Smith & Son's jarrah saw mill, established in October 1877. In 1915 local residents petitioned to change the area's name to Glen Forrest, to honour Sir John Forrest, first Premier of Western Australia.

The suburb is bisected by a disused railway track - the original route of the Eastern Railway - which is now known as the Railway Reserve Heritage Trail, and Nyaania Creek.

It has a number of significant conservation reserves including the Glen Forrest Super Block, which is adjacent to Ryecroft Road (the main connecting road to Darlington).

The major early industries were forestry, and the Stathams Brickworks, which had its own siding, just east of the railway yard. The brickworks was located on a patch of white clay that is now a park and recreation area.

It has two commercial areas - one adjacent to and just north of the former railway station site, and the other at the intersection of Hardey Road and Great Eastern Highway.

Like Darlington to the west, Glen Forrest had at its earliest times a winery, Glen Hardey, on the valley edge down which Hardey Road passes.

== Transport ==
=== Bus ===
- 320 Midland Station to Mundaring – serves Great Eastern Highway
- 321 and 322 Midland Station to Glen Forrest – serve Ryecroft Road, Glen Forrest Drive, Tillbrook Street, Burkinshaw Road, Bilgoman Road, Marnie Road, McGlew Road, Statham Street and Great Eastern Highway
- 328 Midland Station to Chidlow – serves Great Eastern Highway

== Gallery ==
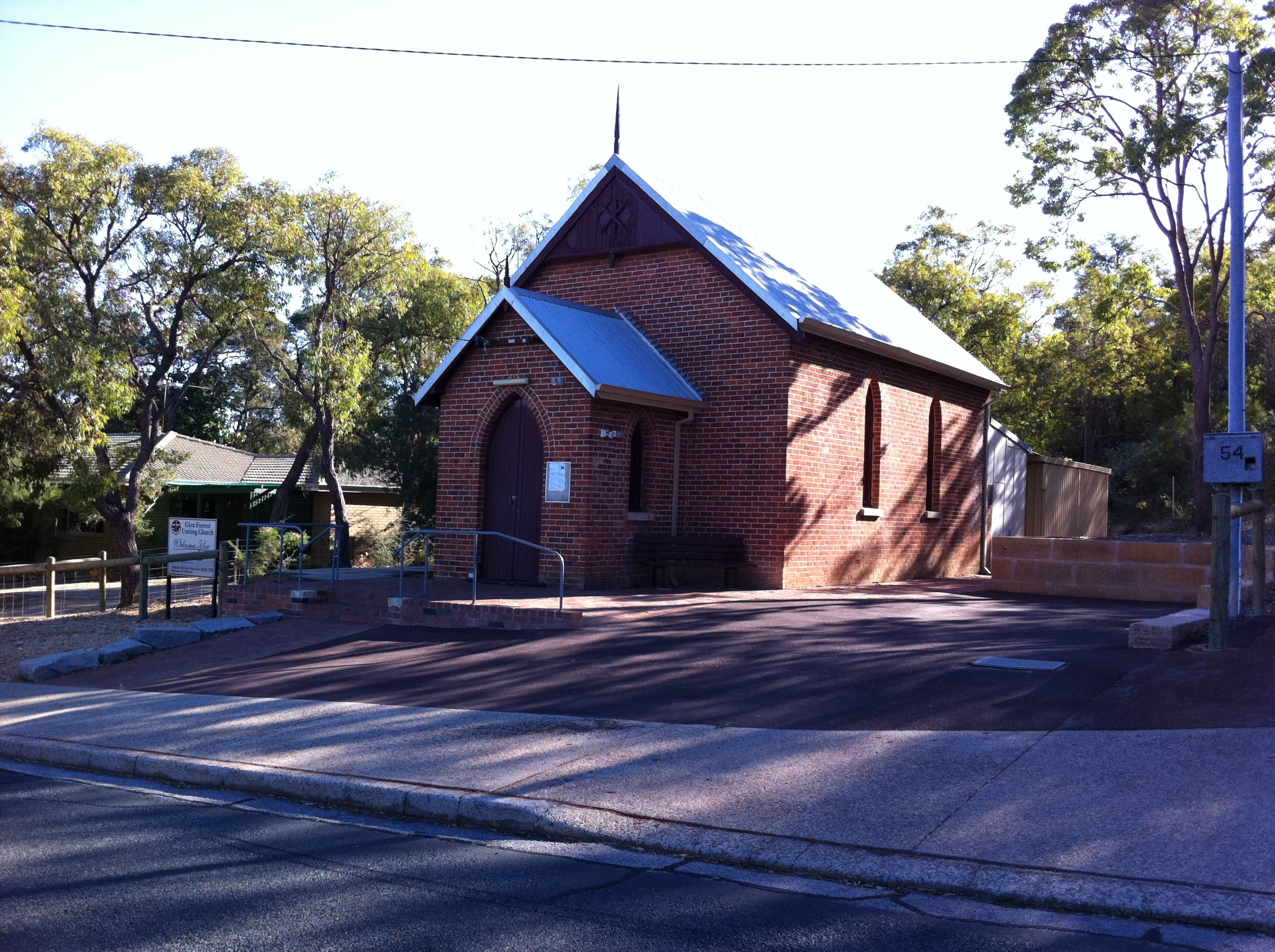

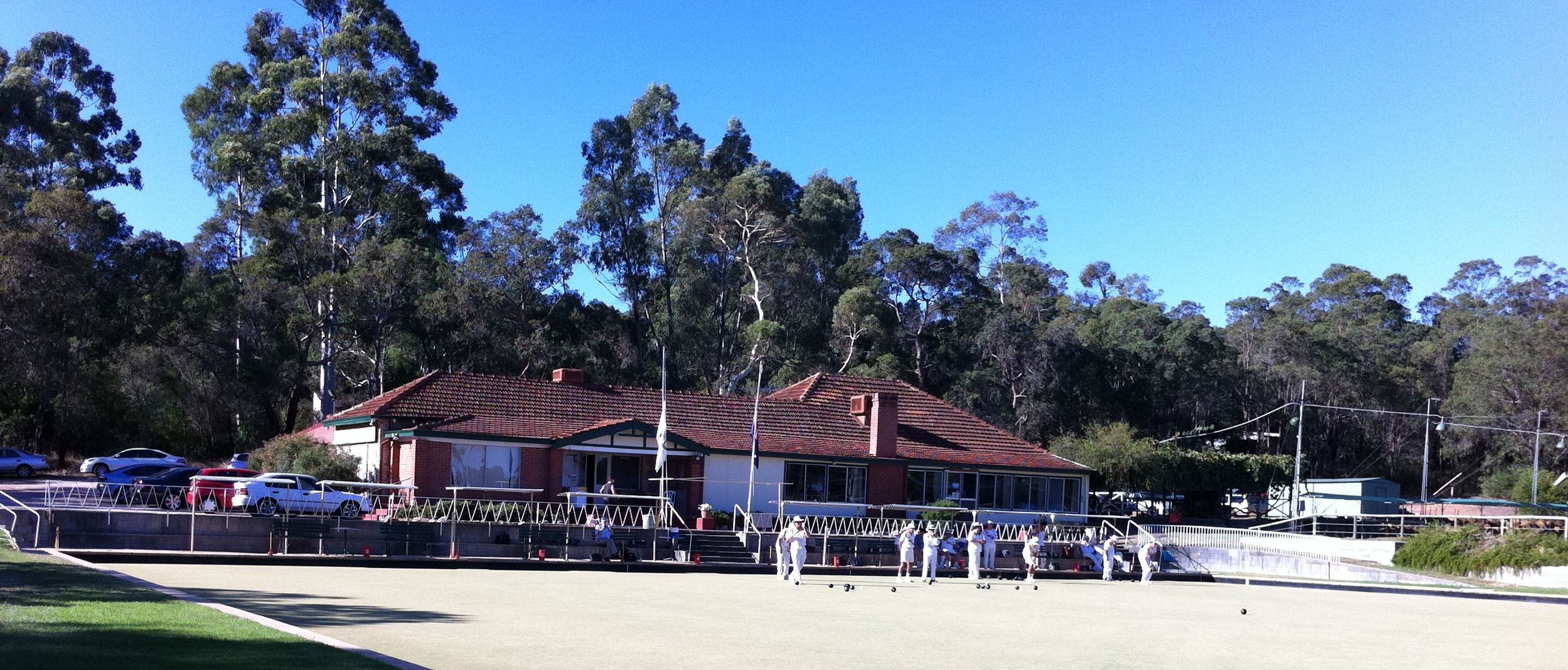
