= Abortion in Hong Kong =

Abortion is available legally in Hong Kong.

== Legislation ==
Article 47A Medical termination of pregnancy of the Offences against the Person Ordinance stipulates that termination of pregnancy is legal if the mother's life or health is at risk, or if the fetus has abnormalities that would result in serious handicaps.

Termination of pregnancy which is of more than 24 weeks duration is not authorised unless two registered medical practitioners agree that the mother's life is at risk.

== History ==
On 17 February 1981, the Legislative Council voted 40 to 7 to pass the controversial abortion bill and legalised abortion in Hong Kong.

== Statistics ==
In 2004, a news report found that the abortion rate of Hong Kong was the highest in the developed world. According to government statistics, in 2001 there were 49,144 live births and hospitals performed 20,235 abortions. The abortion rate was 29.2%. However, the actual figure could be even higher because the data did not include illegal abortions performed over the border in mainland China.

Medical experts attributed the high rate to inadequate sex education in schools. The stigma of abortion also forced women to get illegal abortions in Guangdong. Suvan Law Sui-wan, counsellor at charity group Mother's Choice, explained, "some of the girls are so confused, worried and frustrated and the first thing that comes to their mind is abortion. They think it is safe, quick and effective. In Chinese culture it's shameful to be unmarried and pregnant."

Government statistics of legally terminated pregnancies in approved hospitals or clinics by age group from 2006 to 2015
| Year | Age group | | | | | | | | | Total |
| Year | 0–14 | 15–19 | 20–24 | 25–29 | 30–34 | 35–39 | 40–44 | 45 or above | Unknown age | Total |
|---|---|---|---|---|---|---|---|---|---|---|
| 2006 | 32 | 1164 | 3201 | 2837 | 2549 | 2350 | 1231 | 146 | 0 | 13510 |
| 2007 | 30 | 1199 | 3099 | 2905 | 2612 | 2300 | 1222 | 148 | 0 | 13515 |
| 2008 | 43 | 1129 | 2900 | 2833 | 2568 | 2414 | 1155 | 156 | 1 | 13199 |
| 2009 | 28 | 1052 | 2583 | 2565 | 2305 | 2192 | 1162 | 141 | 0 | 12028 |
| 2010 | 29 | 950 | 2385 | 2356 | 2280 | 2064 | 1042 | 125 | 0 | 11231 |
| 2011 | 32 | 1011 | 2504 | 2549 | 2320 | 2208 | 1126 | 114 | 0 | 11864 |
| 2012 | 30 | 938 | 2361 | 2344 | 2263 | 2156 | 1087 | 119 | 0 | 11298 |
| 2013 | 16 | 874 | 2137 | 2179 | 2278 | 2098 | 964 | 107 | 0 | 10653 |
| 2014 | 22 | 859 | 2035 | 2149 | 2197 | 2007 | 982 | 108 | 0 | 10359 |
| 2015 | 18 | 774 | 1950 | 2042 | 2074 | 1987 | 937 | 108 | 0 | 9890 |
