= Mollie Skinner =

Western Australian writer (1876-1955)

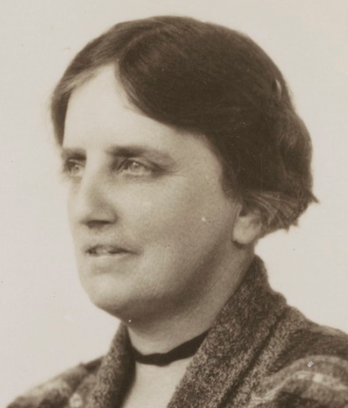
- Mollie Skinner c. 1954
- Born: Mary Louisa Skinner; 19 September 1876; Western Australia
- Died: 25 May 1955 (aged 78); York, Western Australia
- Notable work: The Boy in the Bush

Mary Louisa (Mollie) Skinner (1876 – 1955) was a Western Australian author, best known for the novel The Boy in the Bush co-authored with D. H. Lawrence.

== Biography ==
Mollie Skinner was born on 19 September 1876 to a Western Australian family that had established itself during the early years of settlement, distinguishing her position an "ancient colonist" in the local society from the "t'othersiders" who arrived in Western Australia from the eastern states. The family's religion was the Religious Society of Friends (Quakers). Her mother was Jessie Rose Ellen, the daughter of George Walpole Leake, who had married James Tierney Skinner, a captain in the 18th Royal Irish Regiment. While born in Perth, her family took the infant Mollie to England and Ireland. She began her education in Edinburgh, but a painful condition of the eyes inflicted shortly afterward was treated by placing her in a darkened room for five years. The successful restoration of her health allowed her to begin composing poetry and stories and other tasks, and Skinner later enrolled at the Evelina Hospital for Children in London to begin a career in nursing.

Skinner returned to Perth with the rest of her family in 1900. She operated a convalescent home and guest house with a friend Nellie Beakbane, located in the foothills suburb of Darlington. On the recommendation of a friend, Pussy Jenkins, D H Lawrence and his wife stayed at this house while visiting Western Australia; their meeting would be influential to their respective literary careers.

Mollie Skinner died on 25 May 1955 at the town of York.

== Works ==
Before leaving England in 1900 she was published in the Daily Mail newspaper.

She wrote a memoir describing her experiences during the First World War, as a volunteer aid worker in Burma. Mollie was the co-owner of a guesthouse in Darlington, where D. H. Lawrence stayed, shortly after arriving in the country in 1922. Skinner's Letters of a V. A. D. was given to Lawrence by Margaret Cohen, another friend residing at the house, and he became interested in her other works. After Lawrence read the work, he remarked, "You have been given the Divine Spark and would bury it in a napkin". Her draft novel The House of Ellis was rewritten by Lawrence and published as The Boy in the Bush in August 1924. Her brother Jack was the subject of Lawrence's novel Kangaroo.

Two years after the publication of The Boy in the Bush, she met with Edward Garnett to discuss publishing Black Swans. His critique of the work as "so damn, damn bad" gave rise to Skinner's tears and cries, but he finished by declaring that it was also so "damn, damn good" that he intended to publish it. Skinner's autobiography, The Fifth Sparrow, was edited by Mary Durack and Marjorie Rees while Skinner's health was failing and published posthumously in 1972.

=== Publications ===
- Midwifery Made Easy. (Perth: J. W. Barnard, 1912, and London: Baillière, Tindall & Cox, 1913)
- Letters of a V.A.D. Published under the nom de plume R. E. Leake. London: Andrew Melrose, 1918.
- The Boy in the Bush. With D. H. Lawrence. London: Martin Secker, 1924. New York: Thomas Seltzer, 1924.
- Black Swans. London: Jonathan Cape, 1925.
- Men Are We. Aboriginal Stories. Perth: People's Publishing Co., 1927.
- Tucker Sees India. London: Secker and Warburg, 1937.
- W.X. - Corporal Smith. Perth: R. S. Sampson, 1941.
- When Skies are Blue. Introduction by J. K. Ewers. Perth: Imperial Printing Co, 1946.
- The Witch of Welleway. In The Bulletin, Sydney, 22 February 1956.

=== Legacy ===
Skinner enjoyed moderate success during her lifetime, particularly for the association with D. H. Lawrence, but did not share the fame of contemporaries such as Katherine Susannah Prichard and Mary Durack. Her life story was adapted to a play, Sparrow, first performed in 2018.

Skinner Street in the Canberra suburb Cook was named in her honour.
