= Helena River =

River in Western Australia

Coordinates: 31°54′S 116°00′E

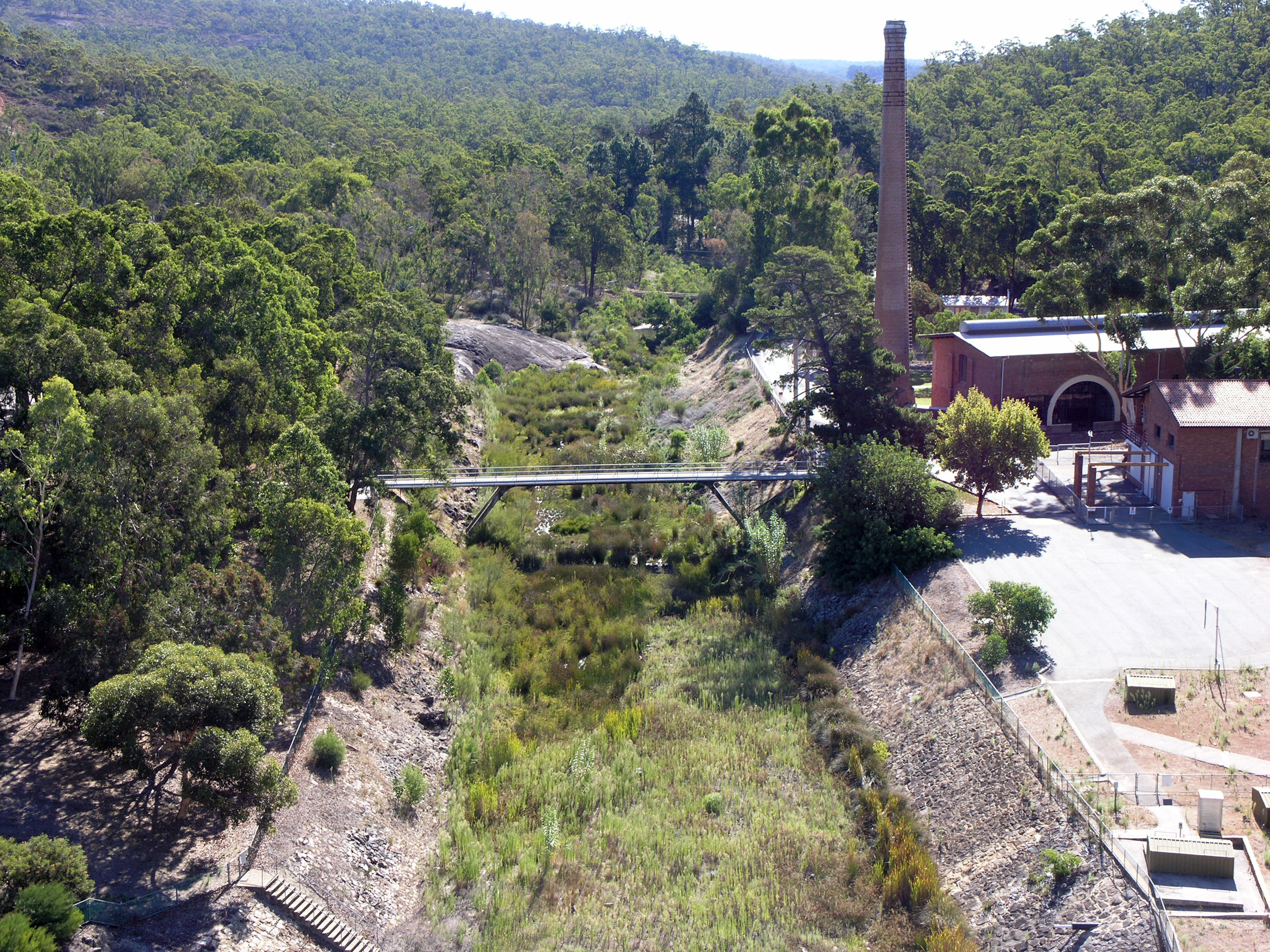
- The Helena River at Mundaring Weir. The building on the right is the original Number 1 pump station for the Goldfields Pipeline

Location
- Country: Australia

The Helena River is a tributary of the Swan River in Western Australia. The river rises in country east of Mount Dale and flows north-west to Mundaring Weir, where it is dammed. It then flows west until it reaches the Darling Scarp.

It passes through the western edge of the Darling Scarp between Gooseberry Hill, and Greenmount Hill before joining the Swan River at the southern edge of the historic town, now suburb, of Guildford.

== Catchment area ==
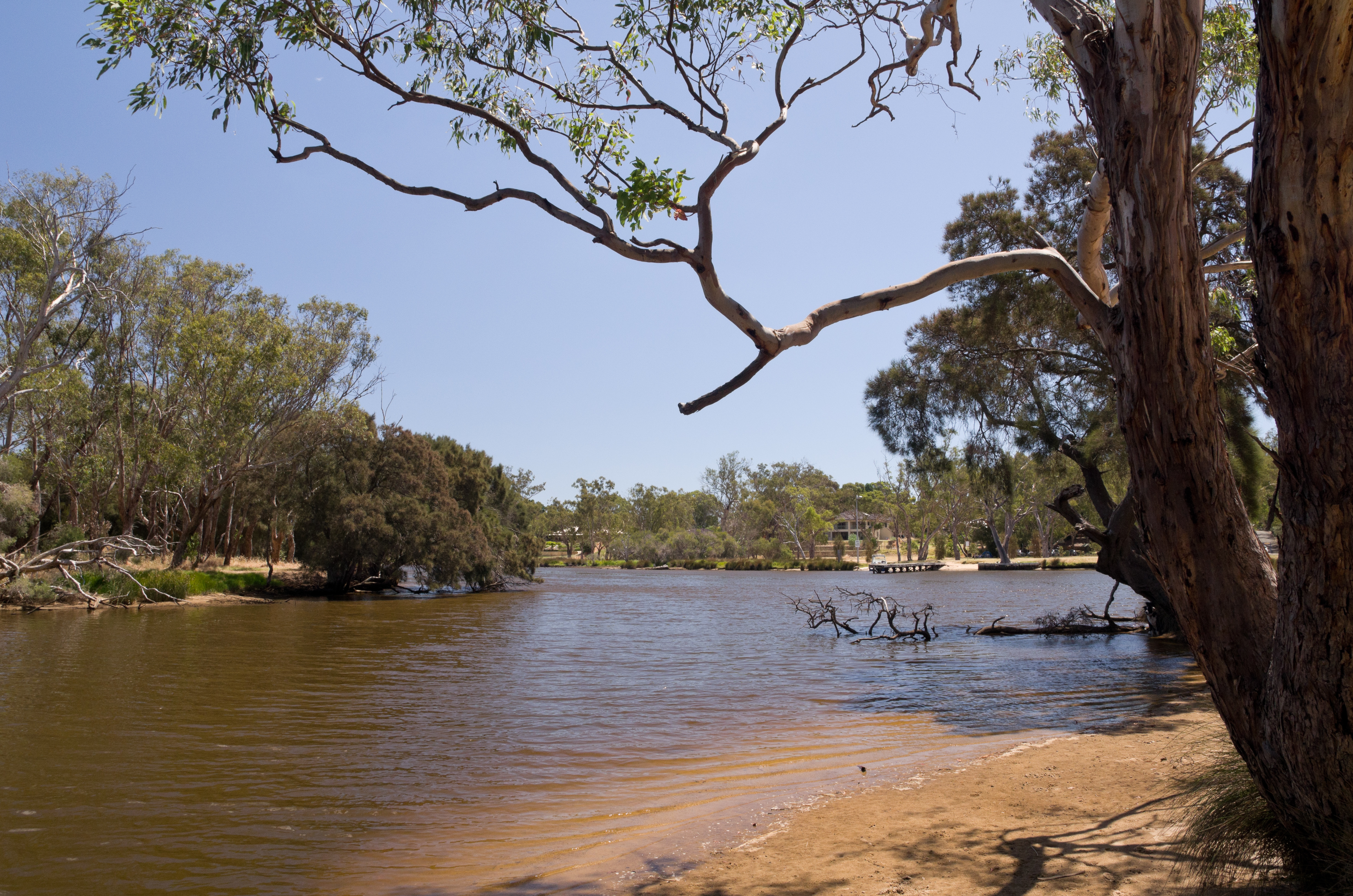
Confluence of Helena River with Swan River at Guildford

Many of the tributaries of the Helena River are unnamed due to their seasonality and size. However, Nyaania Creek on the northern side of the catchment and Piesse Brook on the southern side are significant through moving through built up areas, which also makes them susceptible to urban environment issues.

The Upper Helena catchment (above Mundaring Weir) has a range of named creeks on the north side of Lake C. Y. O'Connor (formerly the Helena River Reservoir) that occur in State Forest no 71 and 13:

- Manns Gully
- Chinaman Gully
- Jones Gully
- Michael Gully
- Chauncy Gully
- Middle Brook
- Helena Brook
- Hancock Brook
- Emu Brook
- Warin Brook

== Environment ==
In higher ground, the Helena River passes mainly through state forest and reserve. This has been beneficial for some of the catchment area, as it has been an important buffer between the urban settlements in the Mundaring and Kalamunda areas. The flora of the Helena Valley has been recognised as being of importance because of the relative richness.

At Darlington, and the locality of Helena Valley there is housing and agriculture on its banks before it emerges out on to the Swan Coastal Plain.

At Bellevue and Midland the river has historically passed hazardous industrial sites. This includes the Midland Railway Workshops site and the Midland livestock sale yards.

== Dams ==
It is dammed in two places – the best known is the upper river dam known as Mundaring Weir which was part of C.Y O'Connor's Goldfields Water Supply Scheme.

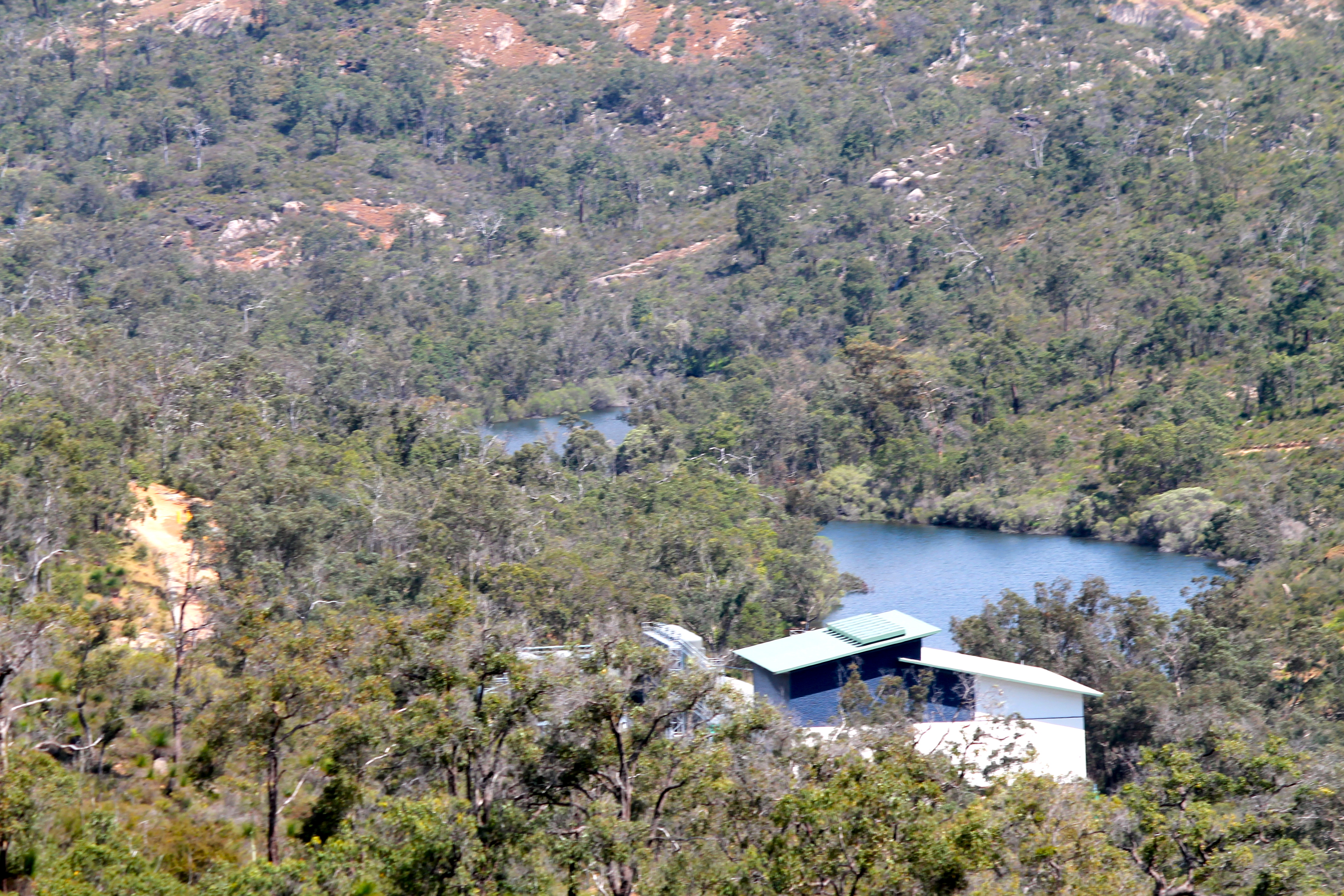
The Pipehead Dam area in 2012

Since the lower dam – known as the Lower Helena Pipehead Dam – has been constructed in the 1970s, flooding of the lower Helena River (in East Guildford and Guildford) has been substantially reduced. Most of the water collected in the Pipehead Dam is pumped back into Mundaring Weir.

Due to this, restrictions in the Helena River catchment have been made to not allow activities that affect the quality of the Pipehead Dam – despite being adjacent to the built up areas within the Shire of Mundaring on the north side of the Helena River catchment.

== Bridges ==
The bridges' designs and strengths were relevant to higher water flow prior to the construction of the Pipehead Dam, as significant flooding occurred in the early and mid twentieth century.

The main bridges are at:

- Mundaring – Below Mundaring Weir, constructed: 1965, structure type: reinforced concrete, superstructure: solid flat slab, length: 48.76 metres, width: 9.12 metres.
- Helena Valley – Scott Street, constructed: 1933, structure type: timber, superstructure: round timber: length: 44 metres, width: 10.77 metres.
- Helena Valley – Roe Highway, constructed: 1985, structure type: prestressed concrete, superstructure: integral beam & slab, length: 54 metres, width: 17.64 metres.
- Midland – Military Road, constructed: 1952, structure type: timber, superstructure: round timber: length: 55.92 metres, width: 8.7 metres.
- Woodbridge – Amherst Road, constructed: 1969, structure type: prestressed concrete, superstructure: inverted t-beam, length: 73.4 metres, width: 11.6 metres.
- East Guildford – Water Street, named: Morrison Bridge, constructed: 1964, structure type: prestressed concrete, superstructure: solid flat slab, length: 70.12 metres, width: 10.54 metres.
- Guildford – Great Eastern Highway / Johnson Street, constructed: 1935, structure type: timber, superstructure: round timber: length: 92.95 metres, width: 11.8 metres.

== General references ==
- Elliot, Ian (1983). Mundaring – A History of the Shire (2nd ed.). Mundaring: Mundaring Shire. ISBN 0-9592776-0-9.
- Siemon, Nicole (2001) Foreshore assessment in the Helena River catchment East Perth, W.A. Water and Rivers Commission. Water resource management series, 1326-6934; report no. WRM 20.ISBN 0730974960
- Spillman, Ken (2003). Life was meant to be here: community and local government in the Shire of Mundaring. Mundaring: Mundaring Shire. ISBN 0-9592776-3-3.
