= Darlington, Western Australia =

Darlington
- Suburb
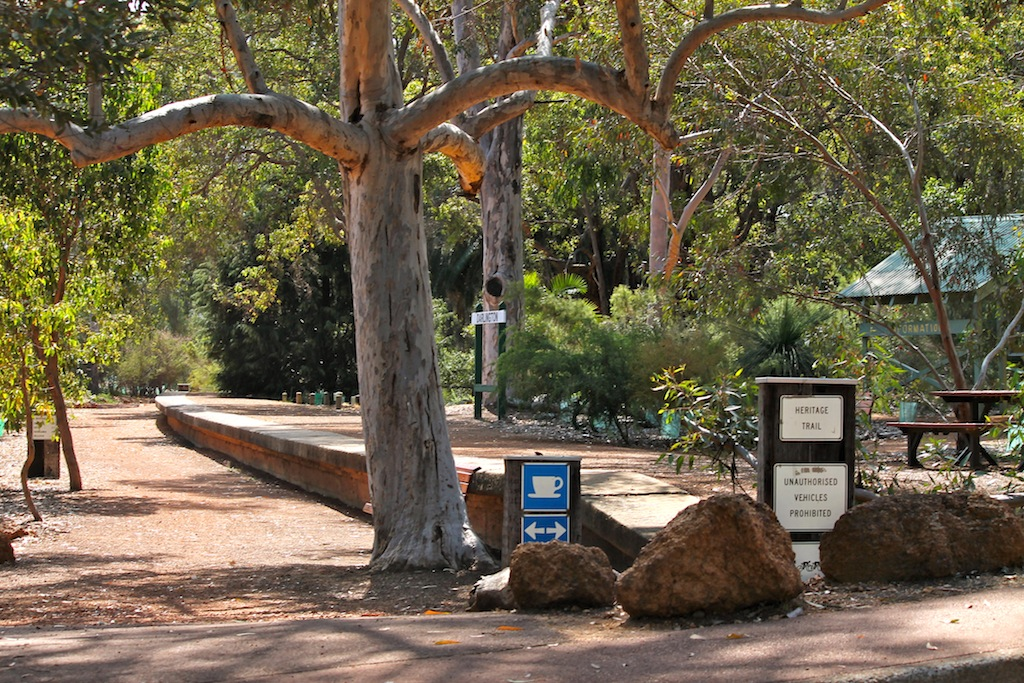
- Darlington railway platform
- Interactive map of Darlington
- Coordinates: 31.901°S 116.081°E
- Country: Australia
- State: Western Australia
- City: Perth
- LGA: Shire of Mundaring
- Location: 20 km (12 mi) from Perth

Government
  - State electorate: Kalamunda
  - Federal division: Bullwinkel

Area
  - Total: 11.9 km^{2} (4.6 sq mi)

Population
  - Total: 3,725 (SAL 2021)
- Postcode: 6070
Suburbs around Darlington
Greenmount	John Forrest National Park	Hovea
Boya	Darlington	Glen Forrest
	Helena Valley

Darlington is a suburb of Perth, Western Australia in the Shire of Mundaring on the Darling Scarp, bisected by Nyaania Creek and north of the Helena River.

== Location ==
About one kilometre to the west of Darlington and lower on the Darling Scarp lies the locality of Boya. Between Darlington and Boya there are two abandoned quarries: C. Y. O'Connor's "Fremantle Harbour Works Quarry", now known as "Hudman Road Amphitheatre", and the Mountain Quarry which is also called Boya quarry. They are situated on the southern slope of Greenmount Hill which is defined by the Great Eastern Highway to the north, and the Helena River to the south. The boundary with Glen Forrest to the east has shifted a few times.

== Geology ==
Darlington is located upon the escarpment of the Darling Fault which trends north-south across the south-west of Western Australia, defining what is known as the Perth Hills.

== History ==
Darlington developed as a locality from the establishment of the Darlington Winery in the late nineteenth century. Unlike Glen Forrest and Greenmount, Darlington was unplanned. Darlington Hall was originally built for the winery.

From 1890 to 1954, Darlington was served by the Mundaring loop on the Eastern Railway, which bisected the town. Darlington was included in "picnic" and "excursion" train itineraries in the 1930s and 1940s. In 1966, the line was officially closed by act of parliament and the tracks removed. The Railway Reserves Heritage Trail, or "bridle trail" as it is known by locals, now occupies the former railway route, and has become a popular walking and bike trail.

Darlington had extensive orchards during the early 20th century. D. H. Lawrence stayed in a local guest house for a short time during his visit to Australia. Guest houses were also used as convalescent homes during the Second World War. By the mid-20th century, many artists had lived in or been associated with the small community. By the late 20th century, the break-up of farms and orchards, with the resulting subdivision of land, had contributed to an increase in the local population.

== Parks and reserves ==
- Darlington Oval - home ground of Darlington Junior Football Club
- Darlington Skate Park - skate park

== Population ==
In the 2016 census, there were 3,656 people in Darlington. 65.4% of people were born in Australia. The next most common country of birth was England at 14.0%. 90.3% of people spoke only English at home. The most common responses for religion were No Religion 40.9%, Anglican 19.3% and Catholic 13.9%.

== Identity ==
Very early on, because of its altitude and separation from the Swan Coastal Plain, Darlington became established as a popular picnic area, country drive destination, and a place for holiday homes.

Writers, artists and others seeking to be separate from Perth's extensive suburban sand plain had sought the location for its natural surroundings. The artists gained the most publicity for their residence, while the writers and others tended to keep their privacy.

Some of the community groups are over 40 years old. For example, the Darlington Residents and Ratepayers Association evolved from the earlier Darlington Progress Association, the Darlington Arts Festival as well. The tennis, cricket and other sports clubs have similar heritage.

A newer arrival, the Darlington Club, is less than two years old and as a social club, is involved in sustaining community involvement and use of the Darlington Hall.

It is one of the few hills communities to be served by several primary schools—the Darlington Primary School (state school), Tree-Tops Montessori School, and Helena College.

The Darlington Arts Festival, an annual event, has been going for more than 40 years. It includes art exhibitions and other events on the Darlington oval.

The 2006 "Trek the Trail" event was organised on the Railway Reserve Heritage Trail and went from Mundaring to Darlington, and included events on the oval.

The Darlington Review is a monthly publication of some 50 years standing, featuring stories, news, advertisements and other material of local interest. It is one of the few of its kind to serve any hills community for such a long time and is delivered to each address in the locality.

== Transport ==
=== Bus ===
- 320 Midland Station to Mundaring – serves Great Eastern Highway
- 321 Midland Station to Glen Forrest – serves Great Eastern Highway, Darlington Road, Mayhew Road, Fischer Road, Stone Crescent, Lionel Road, Hillsden Road, Glen Road, Leithdale Road and Ryecroft Road
- 322 Midland Station to Glen Forrest – serves Coulston Road, Darlington Road, Glen Road, Leithdale Road and Ryecroft Road
- 328 Midland Station to Chidlow – serves Great Eastern Highway

== Notable former residents ==
- Guy Grey-Smith
- Robert Juniper
- D. H. Lawrence - short term
- A. O. Neville
- Mollie Skinner
- George Temple-Poole
- Richard Woldendorp
- Hal Missingham

== Gallery ==
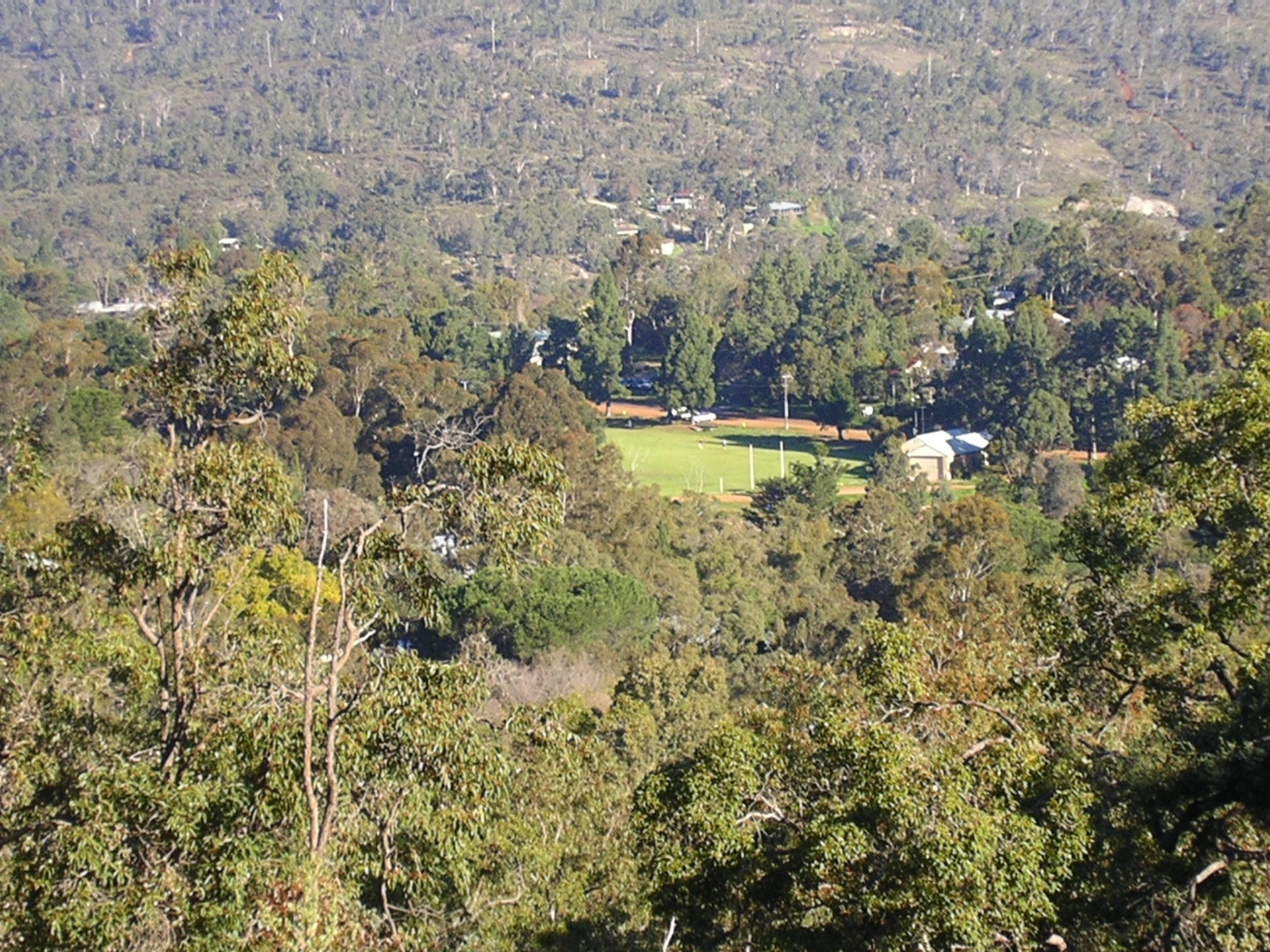
Darlington oval from rear of Greenmount Hill

Cricket on the Darlington Oval, March 2005

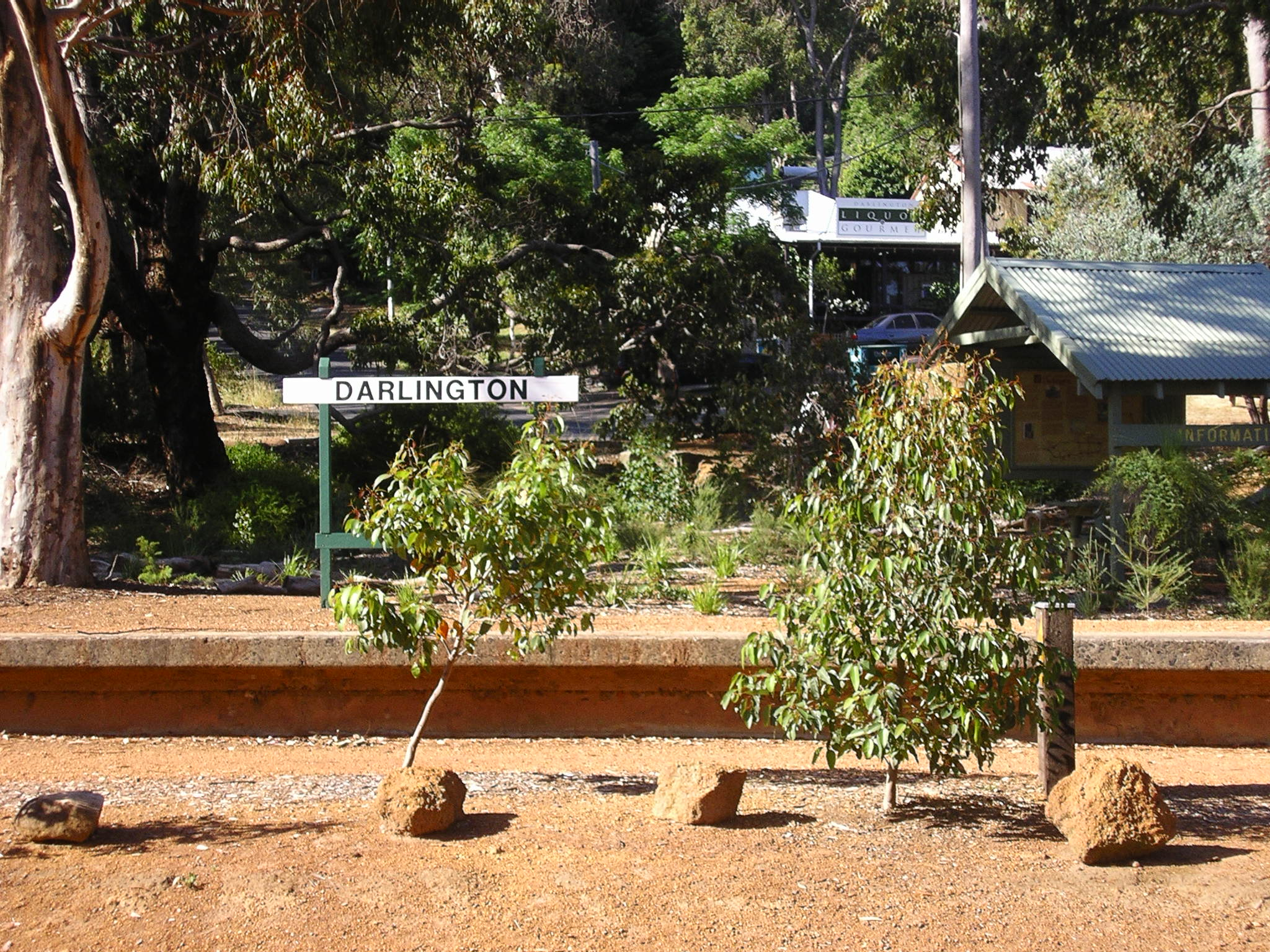
Darlington station platform - last used 1954

== See also ==
- Darlington Hall

== Bibliography ==
- [Brief note on the history of the scouts in Darlington, the first group formed in 1923] Darlington review, Feb.1993, p 7.
- Elliott, I., Mundaring, A History of the Shire, Mundaring, 1983 ISBN 0-9592776-0-9
- Wiltshire, T., A Place in the Hills, Darlington's First Fifty Years, Darlington, 1997 ISBN 0-646-34251-7
- Snell, Ted Darlington and the Hills [videorecording] - in State Reference Library
- Spillman, K., Life was meant to be here, Mundaring, 2003. ISBN 0-9592776-3-3
