= List of heritage places in the Shire of Toodyay =

The State Register of Heritage Places is maintained by the Heritage Council of Western Australia. As of 2026, 174 places are heritage-listed in the Shire of Toodyay, of which 16 are on the State Register of Heritage Places.

== List ==
=== State Register of Heritage Places ===
The Western Australian State Register of Heritage Places, as of 2026, lists the following 16 state registered places within the Shire of Toodyay:

Place name	Place #	Street number	Street name	Suburb or town	Co-ordinates	Notes & former names	Photo
Newcastle Gaol, Lock-up and Stables Group, Toodyay	2558	12	Clinton Street	Toodyay	31.553549°S 116.467034°E	Old Gaol Museum, Old Toodyay Gaol and Police Station Complex	
Toodyay Court House (former) and former Convict Depot Archaeological Sites	2560	13-14	Fiennes Street	Toodyay	31.552776°S 116.465746°E	Toodyay Court House (former), Convict Hiring Depot & Hospital sites	
Toodyay Public Library	2566	96	Stirling Terrace	Toodyay	31.550277°S 116.469599°E	Mechanics' Institute (former), Road Board Office	
Connors Mill (former), Toodyay	2567	129	Stirling Terrace	Toodyay	31.550649°S 116.465338°E	Museum	
Toodyay Fire Station	2568	105	Stirling Terrace	Toodyay	31.550204°S 116.468240°E		
Toodyay Post Office and Residence	2576	115	Stirling Terrace	Toodyay	31.550246°S 116.467093°E	Newcastle Post & Telegraph Office	
Bejoording Homestead Complex and Central Square	2585	34	Second Road	Bejoording	31.384176°S 116.527061°E	Syred's Cottage	
Butterly House	3253	1	Harper Road	Toodyay	31.550559°S 116.464136°E	former Mongers House	
Hasell's Cottage (ruin)	3698	366	Julimar Road	Toodyay	31.528361°S 116.432500°E	Monkey Cottage, Dawson's Cottage	
Roman Catholic Church Group, Toodyay	4125	32-34	Stirling Terrace	Toodyay	31.554760°S 116.475009°E	Franciscan Monastery, St Aloysius Convent, Sisters of Mercy Convent School, Avondown	
Donegan's Cottage	4555	11	Toodyay West Road	Toodyay	31.546227°S 116.458347°E		
Bejoording Townsite Spring-Reserve - Site of	12234			Bejoording	31.384176°S 116.527061°E		
Toodyay War Memorial	14373		Anzac Av	Toodyay	31.552116°S 116.465977°E		
St Aloysius Convent of Mercy (former)	24403	34-38	Stirling Terrace	Toodyay	31.554205°S 116.474899°E	Dormitory block, Mercy House	
St Aloysius Convent of Mercy classrooms and girls dormitory (former)	24459	34-38	Stirling Terrace	Toodyay	31.554493°S 116.475188°E	O'Connor House	
St Aloysius Convent of Mercy classrooms and boys boarders dormitory (former)	24525	34-38	Stirling Terrace	Toodyay	31.554648°S 116.474850°E	Avondown Centre	

=== Shire of Toodyay heritage-listed places ===
The following places are heritage listed in the Shire of Toodyay but are not State registered:

Place name	Place #	Street number	Street name	Suburb or town	Co-ordinates	Notes & former names	Photo
Newcastle State School (former)	2559	6	Duke Street	Toodyay		Toodyay Uniting Church (Methodist), Toodyay Repertory Club, Toodyay School	
Freemason's Hall	2561	19	Fiennes Street	Toodyay		Templar's Hall (former), Temperance Hall	
Newcastle Hospital (former)	2563	7	Henry Street	Toodyay		Residence	
Newgain Granary	2564	389	Dumbarton Road	Toodyay			
Bank of New South Wales (NSW) (former)	2565	108	Stirling Terrace	Toodyay		Challenge Bank, Westpac Bank (former), Bank of W.A. (former)	
Freemason's Hotel (former), Toodyay	2569	125	Stirling Terrace	Toodyay		Newcastle Hotel (former)	
Manchester Unity Independent Order of Oddfellows Hall (former)	2570	111-113	Stirling Terrace	Toodyay		Jager's Store, Toodyay Newsagency, Markets, Drapery & Craft	
Demasson's House and Shop (former)	2571	98	Stirling Terrace	Toodyay		O'Reilly's, The Herald, Toodyay Historical Society	
Toodyay Memorial Hall (former)	2572	117	Stirling Terrace	Toodyay		Shire Hall, Municipal Chambers	
Shops & Dwelling (former)	2573	102 &106	Stirling Terrace	Toodyay		Shoemaker House', Ellery's shop and dwelling	
Shop & Residence (former)	2574	120	Stirling Terrace	Toodyay		St Johns Ambulance, Toodyay Hair Studio, Toodyay Beauty Salon	
Leeder's House & Shop former	2575	94	Stirling Terrace	Toodyay		Roman Catholic School Former	
St John the Baptist Church former	2578	35	Stirling Terrace	Toodyay		St. John the Baptist Church (RC), Residence	
St Stephen's Church of England (former)	2579	130	Stirling Terrace	Toodyay			
Toodyay Tavern	2581	82-86	Stirling Terrace	Toodyay		Lavender Cafe, Newcastle Hotel (former), Newcastle Tavern	
Urwin's Store (former)	2582	123	Stirling Terrace	Toodyay		Caddy 7 Wilshire's Draperty store, Toodyay Bakery & Tearooms, Unwin's Store	
Victoria Hotel & Former Billiard Saloon	2583	114-116	Stirling Terrace	Toodyay			
St Phillip's Anglican Church & Cemetery	2587	1050	Toodyay-Bindi Bindi Road	Culham		Culham Church	
Culham Homestead	2588		Toodyay-Bindi Bindi Road	Culham			
Ringa Railway Bridge	3393		Toodyay-Clackline Road	Hoddy's Well, Toodyay		Ringa-Ringa Creek & Clackline-Toodyay Road	
Road Bridge over Avon River	3490		Goomalling-Toodyay Road	Toodyay		Bridge No 631	
Malkup Brook Farm	3526		Julimar Road	Julimar			
Clackline to Toodyay Railway Formation (1888)	3858			Toodyay - Clackline		Clackline To Toodyay Railway Line	
Hawthornden Farm Precinct	4121	310	Toodyay-Bindi Bindi Road 5k N of	Toodyay			
Glen Craigie	4122	14	Duke Street	Toodyay			
Anglican Rectory (former)	4124	61	Folewood Road	Toodyay		The Cascades, Spion Kop	
Stirling Terrace Streetscape Group	4128		Stirling Terrace	Toodyay			
Windmill Hill Railway Cutting	4518		Windmill Hill	Dumbarton			
Toodyay Station Masters Residence	4549	61	Stirling Terrace	Toodyay			
Drummond's Mill - Site of	4613	141	Toodyay-Bindi Bindi Road	Toodyay		Grove's Dairy, Mill Farm & Vine Cottage	
Hoddy Well & Cottage	4660	925	Clackline-Toodyay Road	Hoddys Well		Chrimes Cottage	
Toodyay Federation Square	4798		Stirling Terrace	Toodyay			
Avondale	12133		Railway Road	Toodyay			
Deepdale	12134		Deepdale Road	West Toodyay		Manager's Residence	
Mt Anderson Homestead (former)	12135	326	Goomalling - Toodyay Road	Dumbarton		Clarkson's, The Range	
Nardie Cemetery	12136		Northam-Toodyay Road	Nardie			
LJ Hooker, Toodyay Bookery & Toodyay's Something Different Shops	12137	112	Stirling Terrace	Toodyay		Brian Buzzard & Co, Manuels Agencies, Clarke, & Doig, Lollipop Shop (former)	
Stirling House	12138	122 B	Stirling Terrace	Toodyay		Toodyay Gentleman's Club (former)	
Ellery Arcade	12139	123	Stirling Terrace	Toodyay			
Toodyay Public Cemetery	12140		Telegraph Road	Toodyay			
Britt's House (former)	12141		Bindoon - Dewars Pool Road	Coondle, Dewar's Pool		Waylen	
Haseley	12142	1910	Toodyay-Bindi Bindi Road	Culham		Cowardine	
Glendearg	12144		Toodyay-Bindi Bindi Road	Bejoording		Erandyne Springs	
The Byeen	12145	Lot 21	Telegraph Road	Bolgart			
Mountain Park	12146		Dumbarton Road	Toodyay		Homestead, Sinclairs Crossing, Nairn Cottage, Dumbarton	
Neugin Homestead	12147	466	Dumbarton Road	Toodyay			
Nardie Homestead	12148	2027	Northam-Toodyay Road	Dumbarton			
Calbaline	12149	6207	Toodyay Road	Toodyay			
Key Farm	12150	6091	Toodyay Road	Toodyay			
Coorinja Winery	12151	5914	Toodyay Road	Hoddys Well			
Blinkbonny	12152	5143	Toodyay Road	Morangup			
Kirk's (Pensioner) Cottage (former)	12153	68	Stirling Terrace	Toodyay			
W.G. Leeder's house (former)	12154	74-76	Stirling Terrace	Toodyay			
Hackett's (Pensioner) Cottage (former)	12155	80	Stirling Terrace	Toodyay			
Pensioner Guard Cottage (Jas Smith's) (former)	12156	92	Stirling Terrace	Toodyay		Scharf's Store, Beardman's Store & Dining Room	
James Martin's Cottage (former)	12157	95	Stirling Terrace	Toodyay			
Toodyay Towing Service	12158	97-99	Stirling Terrace	Toodyay		Prince Bros, Toodyay Garage & Passenger, Service	
The Herald (former)	12159	100	Stirling Terrace	Toodyay		Seil Constructions	
Wendouree Tearoom	12160	110	Stirling Terrace	Toodyay		Hames Tearooms, Whitfield's Store	
House (former)	12161	124	Stirling Terrace	Toodyay		Angus James Real Estate	
Ted Chapman's Cottage (former)	12162	5	Piesse Street	Toodyay		Connor's Restaurant	
Julia Harper's Cottage (former)	12163	Nov-13	Harper Road	Toodyay		Griffin's Cottage	
Anglican Rectory (former)	12164	7	Fiennes Street	Toodyay		Whitfield House, Lee Steere Home	
Green's Cottage (former)	12165	8	Fiennes Street	Toodyay		Warden's Cottage, Burnside Cottage	
Cook's House (former)	12167	3	Folewood Road	Toodyay		G Hassell's House	
The Cascades	12168	50	Folewood Road	Toodyay			
Newcastle Police Stables (former)	12169	15-17	Clinton Street	Toodyay			
Rose Cottage	12171	20	Clinton Street	Toodyay			
Toodyay Police Lock-up (former)	12172		Clinton Street	Toodyay			
Cottage	12173	4	Telegraph Road	Toodyay			
Connor House (former)	12174	9	Telegraph Road	Toodyay			
Hasell House (former)	12175	12	Drummond Street	Toodyay			
D Leeder's House (former)	12176	10-Dec	Telegraph Road	Toodyay			
Connor House (former)	12177	13-15	Telegraph Road	Toodyay			
Recreation Ground, Grandstand & Pavilion, Toodyay	12178		Jubilee Street	Toodyay		Donegan's Cottage, Parker's Cottage	
Parker's Cottage	12180	7	Toodyay Road	Toodyay			
Cottage	12181	4	Jubilee Street	Toodyay			
Jane Clarkson's Cottage (former)	12183	46	Telegraph Road	Toodyay		Jain Clarkson	
Original Toodyay Townsite Precinct	12184			West Toodyay			
House	12185	48	Stirling Terrace	Toodyay			
House	12186	3	Arthur Street	Toodyay			
House	12187	78	Stirling Terrace	Toodyay			
Oddfellows House (former)	12188	3	Oddfellow Street	Toodyay			
CWA Rooms	12189	101	Stirling Terrace	Toodyay		Coondle Hall	
Toodyay Wine Saloon & Sanderson's Veges (former)	12192	109	Stirling Terrace	Toodyay		Ray White Real Estate	
School Master's house (former)	12193	2	Duke Street	Toodyay		Toodyay community Resource Centre	
Connor's House (former)	12194	133	Stirling Terrace	Toodyay			
Rose Valley Cottage	12195	17	Harper Road	Toodyay			
Knockdomony Cottage	12196	3-May	Duke Street	Toodyay		(Whitfields) Lavender Cottage	
Durley Hill	12197		Folewood Road	Toodyay		Stevens Cottage	
Thomas Whittle's Cottage (former)	12198	30	Clinton Street	Toodyay			
Viewlands	12199	7-Nov	Duke Street	Toodyay			
Seven Factory Houses (former)	12200		Toodyay Road	Toodyay			
James Cottage	12201	6298	Toodyay Road	Toodyay		Fingerpost	
Cottage	12202	4-Jun	Mt Anderson Street	Toodyay		Mary Lees', Donnelly's	
Group of 4 cottages	12203	39-45	Telegraph Road	Toodyay			
Mayfield	12204	188	Toodyay WeStreet Road	Coondle			
Hasson House (former)	12205	310	Toodyay Road WeStreet	Toodyay			
Rockhaven	12206	9	Clarke Street	West Toodyay		Loviebond & Howies	
Vetter Cottage & Winery Ruins	12207		Toodyay-Bindi Bindi Road	Coondle			
Cottage	12208			Coondle			
Community Sheep Dip	12209	55	Bindoon - Dewars Pool Road	Coondle, Dewars Pool			
Royd Nook Cottage & Wool Shed	12210		Alan Twine Road	Royd Nook			
Charlie Syred's house (former)	12212	3260	Toodyay-Bindi Bindi Road	Wattening			
White Lakes Ruins	12213	off	Goomalling-Toodyay Road	Nardie		Whitfields, Wicklow Hills	
Knockdomony	12214	76	Goomalling-Toodyay Road	Toodyay		Whitfields, part of original	
Tipperary Ruin	12215	76	Goomalling-Toodyay Road	Dumbarton		Whitfields, part of original Wicklow Hills	
Foggarthorpe	12216		Goomalling Road	Toodyay		Clarkson's, Mt Anderson	
Yandee Homestead	12217	1	Woodlands Road	Nunile		Mt Anderson, Clarkson's	
Maisemore	12218	Lot 11	Dumbarton Road	Toodyay			
Extracts Factory (former)	12219	6	Extracts Place	Dumbarton			
Factory Management Houses (former)	12220	1944-1956	Northam-Toodyay Road	Dumbarton			
Toodyay Railway Station - Site of	12221	61-65	Stirling Terrace	Toodyay		Newcastle Railway Station, Alma Beard Medical Centre	
Monger's Store - Site, Duidgee Park	12222		Railway, Harper & Telegraph Roads	Toodyay		Nottingham House	
Pelham Reserve	12223		Pelham Street	Toodyay			
West Toodyay School - Site of	12224		Julimar Road	West Toodyay			
Alex Ferguson's Smithy - Site of	12225			West Toodyay		Barn Elms, Water's	
Coondle Siding - Site of	12226			Coondle			
Coondle Hall - Site of	12227		Bindoon - Dewars Pool Road	Coondle			
Coondle School - Site of	12228			Coondle			
Coondle Homestead - Site of	12229	Lot 1	Coondle WeStreet Road	Coondle			
Coondle Post Office & Store	12230		Church Gully Road	Coondle		Site of Mrs Fawell's place	
Culham Hall - Site of	12231			Culham			
Culham Cricket Ground - Site of	12232	Cnr	Telegraph & Toodyay-Bindi Bindi Road	Culham			
Lunn's Landing Siding - Site of	12233		South of	Culham		Chinese Market Gardens	
Bejoording Siding - Site of	12235		Western Road	Bejoording			
Wattening Temperance Hall - Site of	12236			Wattening		Templar Hall	
Nunile Hall - Site of	12237	570	Woodendale Road	Nunile			
Key Farm Siding - Site of	12238		Toodyay Road	Toodyay			
10 Mile Hill School - Site of	12239		Toodyay-Perth Road	Toodyay			
Jimperding Cemetery - Site of	12240		Cobbler Pool Road	Jimperding			
Jimperding Gold Mine - Site of	12241		Jingaling Brook Road	Morangup		Jimperding Hill descent	
Morangup Spring - Site of	12242			Morangup			
Cottage	13957	7	Telegraph Road	Toodyay			
Toodyay Fire Station (former)	14648			Toodyay		Newcastle Fire Station (former)	
Toodyay Police Station & Courthouse	17324		Stirling Terrace	Toodyay		Toodyay Police Station	
Bindoon Defence Training Area	17535			Bindoon			
Victoria Hotel	24401	114-116	Stirling Terrace	Toodyay			
Victoria Billiard Saloon	24461	114-116	Stirling Terrace	Toodyay			
Royd Nook Cottage	24493	26	Alan Twine Road	Royd Nook			
Dr Growse's House	24518	34-38	Stirling Terrace	Toodyay			
Catholic Presbytery (former)	24522	32	Stirling Terrace	Toodyay		Earth Craft Nursery	
Royd Nook Wool Shed	24534	30	Alan Twine Road	Royd Nook			
Rock Cairn	24711		Chittering Road	Moondyne			
Joe's Cage	24717		off Sapper Road	Moondyne			
House	24724	37	Telegraph Road	Toodyay			
Shepherd's Rock	24732		Dumbarton Road	Dumbarton			
House	24734	39	Telegraph Road	Toodyay			
House	24739	33	Telegraph Road	Toodyay			
House	24757	45	Telegraph Road	Toodyay			
House	24758	2	Jubilee Street	North Toodyay			
Bridge 363, Tinks Bridge, Northam-Toodyay Road, Toodyay	25703		Northam Toodyay Road	Toodyay			
Bridge 364, Koondinee Creek, Northam-Toodyay Road, Dumbarton	25704		Northam Toodyay Road	Dumbarton			
Bridge 365, Harper Brook, Northam-Toodyay Road, Dumbarton	25705		Northam Toodyay Road	Dumbarton			
Forrest Avon Survey Cairns	26086						
Toodyay Road, Stone Wall Cobble Remnants	26200						
Toodyay Townsite	26408						
Bridge 0694, Toodyay Road, Toodyay	27306						
