= List of acts of the Parliament of Western Australia from 1922 =

This is a list of acts of the Parliament of Western Australia for the year 1922.

== 1922 ==
=== Public acts ===
Short title, or popular name	Citation	Royal assent
Long title
Workers' Homes Act Amendment Act 1921	No. 1 of 1922	31 January 1922
An Act to further amend the Workers' Homes Act, 1911. (Note: Workers' Homes Act 1911 (No. 8 of 1912))
Railway Siding (North Fremantle) Act 1922	No. 8 of 1922	31 January 1922
An Act to authorise the construction, maintenance, and working of a siding in connection with the Government Railway at North Fremantle.
Wyalcatchem–Mount Marshall Railway (Extension No. 2) Act 1922	No. 22 of 1922	13 November 1922
An Act to authorise a further extension of the Wyaleatehem–Mount Marshall Railway.
Esperance Northwards Railway Extension Act 1922	No. 35 of 1922	30 December 1922
An Act to authorise an Extension of the Esperance-Northwards Railway.
	No. X of 1922	
Land Tax and Income Tax Act 1922	No. 41 of 1922	23 December 1922
An Act to impose a Land Tax and an Income Tax.

=== Private acts ===
Short title, or popular name	Citation	Royal assent
Long title
Western Australian Bank Act Amendment Act 1922	Private Act of 1922	13 December 1922
An Act to amend the Western Australian Bank Act, 1896. (Note: Western Australian Bank Act 1896 (60 Vict. Private Act))

== Sources ==
- "legislation.wa.gov.au".
