= Wendouree Tearooms =

Building in Toodyay, Western Australia

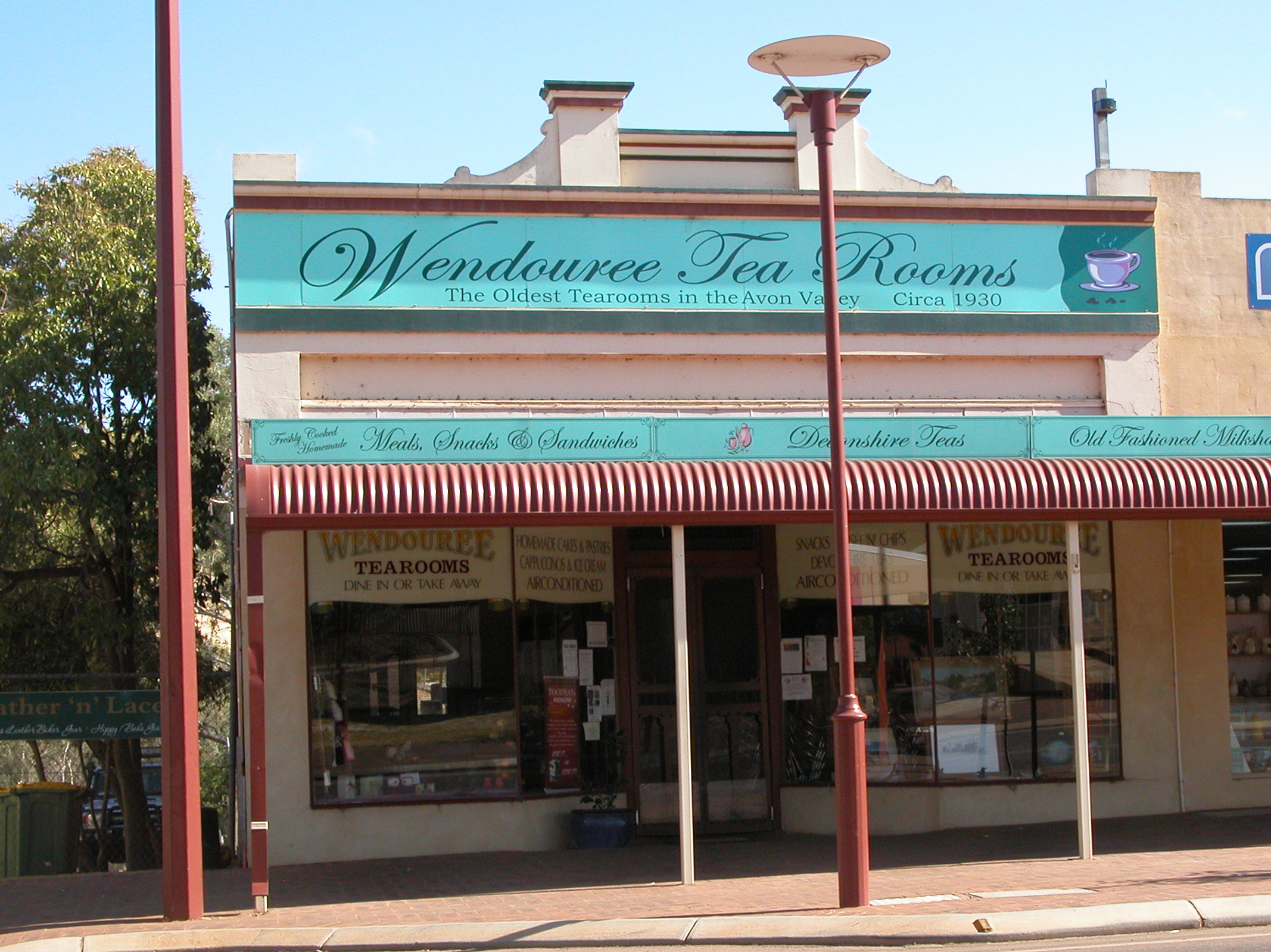
- Interactive map of the Wendouree Tearooms area
- Former names: Haymes Tearooms, Whitfield's Store, Toodyay Bakery

General information
- Architectural style: Victorian, Art Deco influenced façade
- Location: 110 Stirling Terrace, Toodyay, Australia
- Coordinates: 31.5499°S 116.4679°E
- Completed: c. 1868, 1895/1920s

References
- Toodyay municipal inventory

Wendouree Tearooms is located on Stirling Terrace in Toodyay, Western Australia. Several businesses have previously been located at the site, including a bakery and produce store. Over the years it has been run by various families and individuals.

== Early history ==
Daniel Connor built a shop and house on this site in the late 1860s. During the recession of the 1880s this building, along with other Connor properties, was sold. Alterations over the years to both sides of the building now completely conceal whatever may remain of the original construction. The premises have, however, always operated as tearooms offering hospitality and services on the main street of Toodyay since around 1870.

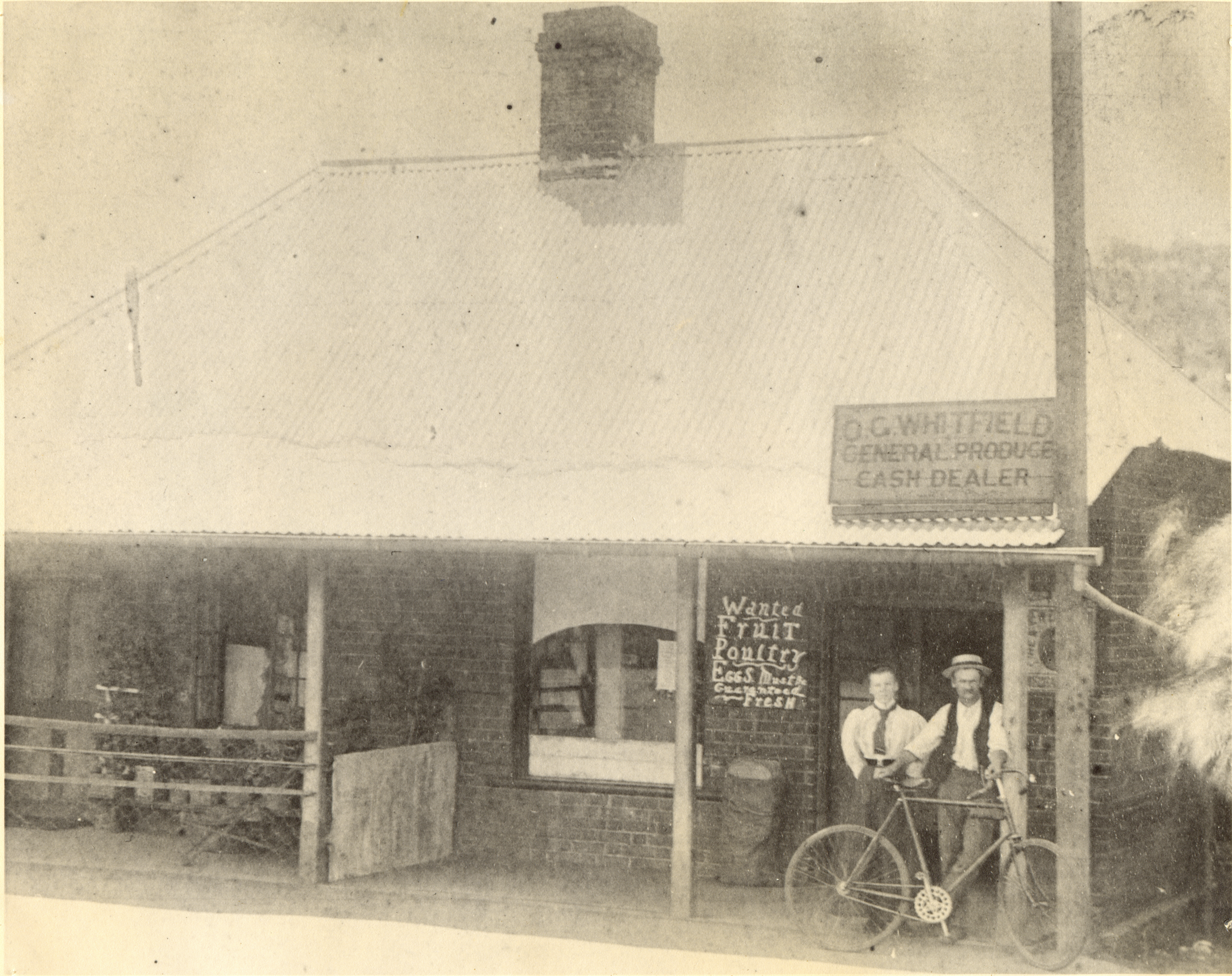
Whitfield's Produce Store c1900 with Oliver and Eva Whitfield at front

== Whitfield and Leyden ==
In 1900, Oliver and Eva Whitfield operated a general produce store on the site, which was located beside the Western Australian Bank, Newcastle Branch. One half of the building was the dwelling and the other half was the shop. In later years, as the site was developed, the retail section was moved to the opposite end of the building. In 1903 the Newcastle Herald ran an advertisement promoting the business of Whitfield and Green, describing them as bakers and confectioners next to the WA Bank. The following month the bakery business was sold to Mr H. Marris. In December 1909 J. Leyden took over the business, selling it in 1914 to J. Neaylon (also spelled Nealyon). During this period bread from the bakery was being despatched by train to sidings of the Toodyay–Bolgart and Clackline–Bakers Hill railway lines.

== Haymes family ==
In 1919, the bakery was sold to George Haymes. Throughout the 1920s Haymes operated tearooms on the site and during this time he added a glass shop front. The Toodyay Herald reported in November 1924 that "Mr Haymes' contractor has also commenced his work and is busy laying out the foundations of our new modern structure that is to be our new 'staff of life' depot." The new shop was called "The Wendouree Refreshment Rooms" and, in a first for Toodyay, a new verandah was constructed using the cantilever principle that did not require supporting poles.

On 6 July 1929, the Toodyay Road Board granted permission for a fuel bowser to be installed out the front. It is not known when the bowser was removed.

== Hillbricks and Campbells ownership ==
The Haymes family departed Toodyay in February 1938. The Hillbrick family then took over, advertising the business in the May 1939 Toodyay State School magazine as "Wendouree Tearooms, H.W. Hillbrick & Sons". In 1945 the business was sold to Mr. E.J. Campbell who installed modern machinery and re-organised the bakehouse. In addition to bread, Campbell also sold a range of small cakes, pastries, and wedding and birthday cakes. In March 1950, the local fire brigade was summoned to a fire that had started in the large wood stack behind the bakery. Although the cause was unknown, quick action reduced the amount of damage. In October 1954, as proprietor of the Wendouree Tearooms, Campbell placed the advertisement “Eat more Bread” in the Schedule of Prizes for the Toodyay Agricultural Society's Annual Show. It is not known when he retired from the business, nor the date of the changes that were made to the site in the following decades.

== Broderick ownership ==
In 1984, Rob and Leah Broderick purchased the site, now trading as Toodyay Takeaways, and commenced plans to restore the building and business to its former name and style. In May 1986, filming for the Australian feature film Shame took place on this site, which was then known as The Avon Kitchen. By January 1989, the business was once again being referred to as the Wendouree Tearooms. In June of the same year, Hilda and her son Brett Christian had taken over the business.

== Duncan ownership ==
In 1995, Jayne and Johnny Duncan bought the tearooms running it until January 1999.

== Archaeological dig ==
In February 2003, an archaeological dig (supervised by archaeologist Gaye Nayton) was undertaken on the site adjacent to the tearooms of the old cottage that was demolished to make way for the new chemist shop. The finds were lodged with the collections of the Shire of Toodyay's Newcastle Gaol Museum.

== Recent use ==
Today the tearooms are located in a single-height brick structure with a prominent parapet which is slightly Egyptian in style with an Art Deco influence. It has a double-fronted glazed shop front with a central recessed door. The adjoining house has been demolished and a matching shop front has been erected in its place. A separate commercial business operates out of this side.
