= List of acts of the Parliament of Western Australia from 1925 =

This is a list of acts of the Parliament of Western Australia for the year 1925.

== 1925 ==
=== Public acts ===
Short title, or popular name	Citation	Royal assent
Long title
	No. 1 of 1925	26 August 1925
An Act to apply out of the Consolidated Revenue Fund the sum of Eight Hundred and Fifty Thousand Pounds, and from Moneys to Credit of the General Loan Fund Seven Hundred and Fifty Thousand Pounds, and from Moneys to Credit of the Government Property Sales Fund Ten Thousand Five Hundred Pounds, and from Moneys to Credit of the Land Improvement Loan Fund Three Thousand Pounds to the Service of the Year ending 30th June, 1926, and to apply out of the Public Account the sum of Three Hundred Thousand Pounds for the purposes of temporary Advances to be made by the Colonial Treasurer.
Group Settlers' Advances Act 1925	No. 2 of 1925	12 September 1925
An Act relating to Advances by the Department of Lands and Surveys to enable Group Settlers and other Persons to acquire Live Stock and other Chattels, and to cultivate and improve their Holdings.
City of Perth Act 1925	No. 11 of 1925	17 October 1925
An Act to confer on the City of Perth additional powers relating to the opening, diverting, altering, or increasing the width of streets, and to amend Section 217 of the Municipal Corporations Act, 1906. (Note: Municipal Corporations Act 1906 (No. 32))
Fremantle Municipal Tramways and Electric Lighting Act Amendment Act 1925	No. 24 of 1925	16 December 1925
An Act to further amend the Fremantle Municipal Tramways and Electric Lighting Act, 1903. (Note: Fremantle Municipal Tramways and Electric Lighting Act 1903 (Private))
	No. X of 1925	
Main Roads Act 1925	No. 51 of 1925	31 December 1925
An Act to make provision for the construction, maintenance, and supervision of Main and Developmental Roads; and for other relative purposes.

=== Private acts ===
Short title, or popular name	Citation	Royal assent
Long title
Western Australian Bank Act Amendment Act 1925	Private Act of 1925	17 October 1925
An Act to further amend "The Western Australian Bank Act, 1896." (Note: Western Australian Bank Act 1896 (60 Vict. Private Act))
West Australian Trustee Executor and Agency Company Limited Act Amendment Act 1925	Private Act of 1925	17 October 1925
An Act to amend "The West Australian Trustee Executor and Agency Company Limited Act." (Note: West Australian Trustee Executor and Agency Company Limited Act 1893 (56 Vict. Private Act))
British Imperial Oil Company, Limited (Private) Act 1925	Private Act of 1925	31 December 1925
An Act to grant to the British Imperial Oil Company, Limited, powers and provisions for the Storage and Supply of Oil, Liquid Fuel, Petroleum Spirits, Kerosene and Petroleum Products, and for other purposes.

== Sources ==
- "legislation.wa.gov.au".
