= Toodyay Fire Station =

Fire station in Toodyay, Western Australia

Coordinates: 31.550636°S 116.464512°E

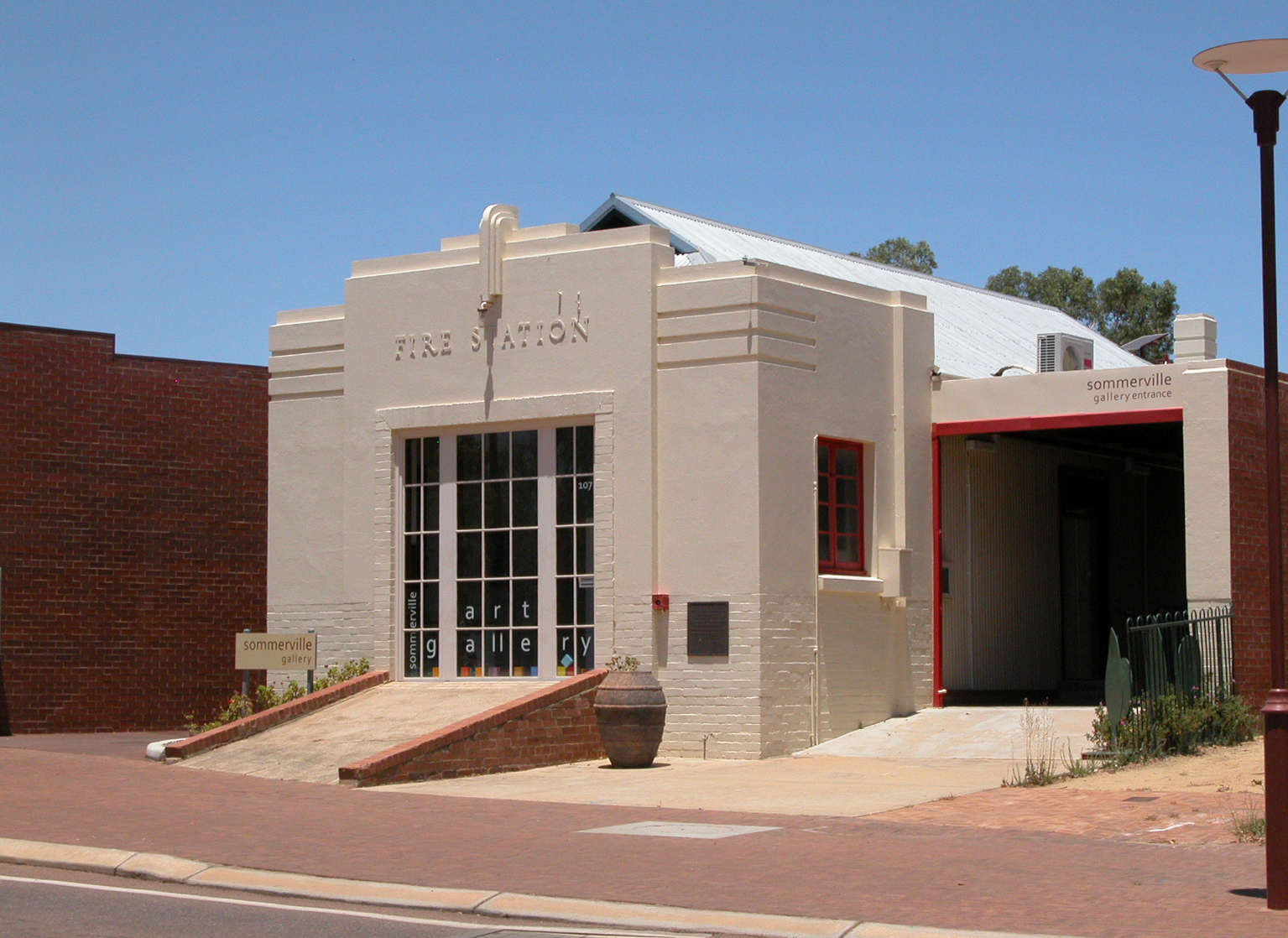
- Interactive map of the Toodyay Fire Station area

General information
- Architectural style: Inter-war Classical-Art Deco influences
- Location: 105-107 Stirling Terrace, Toodyay
- Completed: 1939

Design and construction
- Architect: Ken Duncan

Western Australia Heritage Register
- Type: State Registered Place
- Designated: 5 November 1999
- Reference no.: 2568

References
- Toodyay municipal inventory

Toodyay Fire Station is on Stirling Terrace in Toodyay, Western Australia.

== Architectural style ==
Toodyay Fire Station was designed by architect Ken Duncan, a member of the Volunteer Fire Brigade, and was built in 1938. It is notable for its Art Deco facade. It is one of two single bay Stripped Classical fire stations built during the Western Australian Fire Brigades Board's 1930s building campaign. It is rendered in part and bricked to a lower level, all painted. An extension to the side is in the same style.

== History ==
Toodyay Fire Station was a result of the Bush Fires Act 1937, which permitted local authorities to take over the responsibility of bushfire control, along with the purchase and storage of fire-fighting equipment and setting up of fire-fighting brigades.

The fire station services were relocated to a new building in 2002.

The Toodyay Fire Station is now used as an art gallery.
