= Urwin's Store =

Historic building in Toodyay, Western Australia

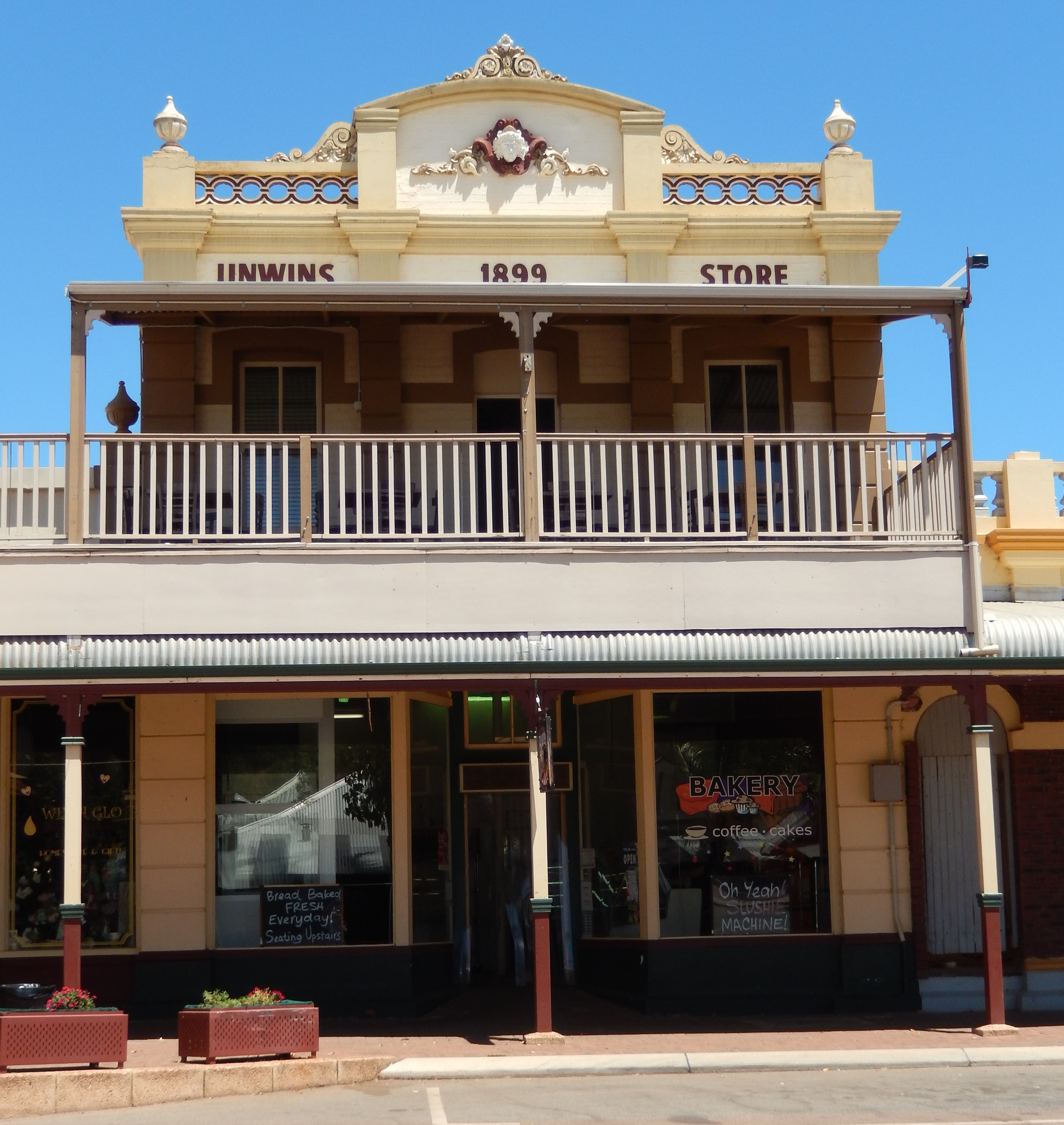
- Urwin's Store in 2014
- Interactive map of the Urwin's Store area
- Former names: Caddy & Wilshire's Drapery Store, Unwin's Store
- Alternative names: Toodyay Bakery

General information
- Architectural style: Victorian Classical
- Location: 123 Stirling Terrace, Toodyay, Western Australia, Australia
- Coordinates: 31.550285°S 116.466292°E
- Completed: 1898

Technical details
- Floor count: 2
- Lifts/elevators: 1

Design and construction
- Main contractor: Henry Davey Jnr.

References
- Toodyay municipal inventory

Urwin's Store is a historically significant building located on Stirling Terrace in Toodyay, Western Australia. It is registered on the Australian Heritage Database.

== History ==
It was built in 1898 by Henry Davey Jnr. It is a double storey building with parapet decorated with scrolls and finials, and it is constructed of rendered brick, with a ridged iron roof and timber framed windows. The ground floor has always been used as a shop and has retained much of its original character and features. The shop was originally known as Urwin's Drapery Store and it was later known as Caddy & Wilshire's Drapery Store. The upper storey now has a balcony or verandah that extends over the lower street level.

The façade names the building as "Unwins Store" (with an 'n'), but as it was built for Robert Urwin the name on the front is incorrect. This name was applied in error and it is not the preferred name.

The Toodyay Masonic Lodge rented the upstairs rooms from 1899 before moving to its current premises in 1924. Other lodges also used these rooms: The Order of the Buffaloes held meetings there until the 1950s.

A hairdresser and tobacconist's shop was built the year after Urwin's Store, to fill the gap between it and the Freemasons Hotel. This was also built by Davey and was operated by Carl Heiden.

A retail bakery is currently operating from the premises, known as Toodyay Bakery. The business is run by Jason and Cassie Marion, and is famous for creating what came to be known as "Australia's Best Pastie" in 2016.
