= Moondyne Festival =

Annual festival in Australia

- Moondyne Festival Logo
- Status: Active
- Genre: Festival
- Date: First Sunday in May
- Frequency: Annually
- Venue: Stirling Terrace
- Location: Toodyay, Western Australia
- Coordinates: 31.551°S 116.464°E
- Country: Australia
- Years active: 42
- Inaugurated: 6 June 1984
- Major events: Period costume, street theatre, street stalls, art and antique displays
- Website: moondynefestival.com.au

The Moondyne Festival is a festival held in Toodyay, Western Australia, celebrating the life and times of Moondyne Joe. It is held annually on the first Sunday in May. This festival takes place in the main street, Stirling Terrace, with street theatre, market stalls, and demonstrations. During the festival, the town is described as being transported back in time.

The festival features costumes from the 19th century, street theatre involving the character of Moondyne Joe, street stalls, and displays of art and antiques. Other characters portrayed include the "Swagmen" (Moondyne's gang), temperance ladies, the undertaker, and the barber.

== History ==
The Moondyne Festival was first held in 1984.

In 2002, the Moondyne Festival was part of the national Year of the Outback celebrations. In 2011, the festival was scheduled to be opened by the Governor of Western Australia, Ken Michael.

The Moondyne Festival was nominated for and a finalist in the 2012 Perth Airport Events & Tourism Award. It was also nominated for a 2013 Heritage Award. In 2014 the festival received funding from the State Government Regional Events Scheme. It was one of a number of regional festivals to benefit from $40 million (over four years) of funding from Royalties For Regions.
