= Victoria Billiard Saloon =

Billiard saloon in Toodyay, Western Australia

Coordinates: 31°32′59″S 116°28′03″E

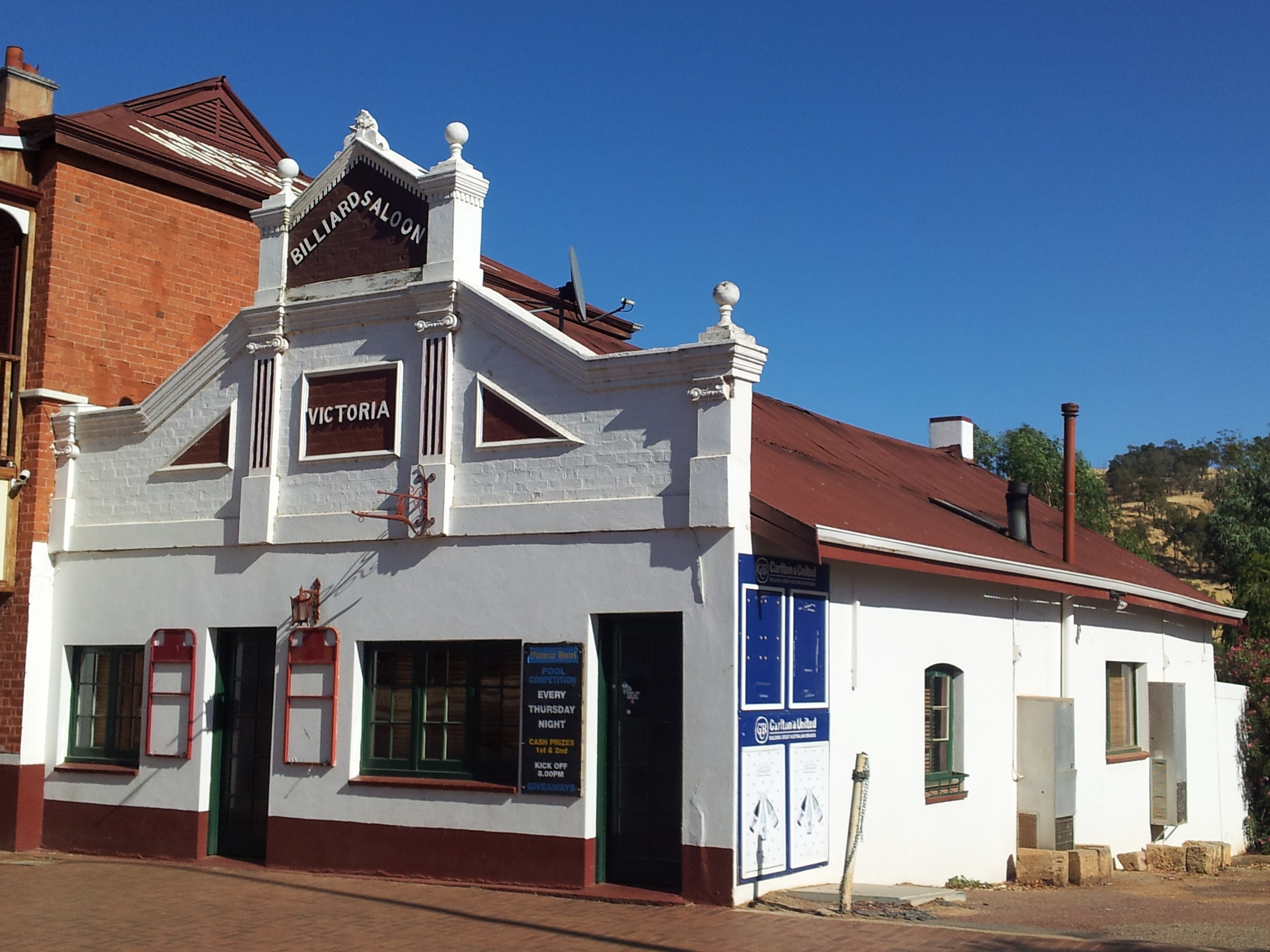
- Interactive map of the Victoria Billiard Saloon area

General information
- Architectural style: Victorian Free Classical
- Location: 114-116 Stirling Terrace, Toodyay
- Completed: c. 1895

Design and construction
- Main contractor: H. Davey

References
- Toodyay municipal inventory

Victoria Billiard Saloon is situated on Stirling Terrace in Toodyay, Western Australia and is one of the few remaining billiard saloons in the state.

It was purpose built as a billiard saloon in the mid-1890s adjacent to the Victoria Hotel. The builder was H. Davey and the building originally comprised two shops with the saloon at the rear. It is of brick construction with corrugated iron roof gable roof. The front façade is rendered with a decorative parapet with finials, columns and pilasters. In the 1930s the premises was used as a betting shop. Later it was a barber's shop before returning to use as a billiard room.
