= James Martin's Cottage =

Cottage in Toodyay, Western Australia

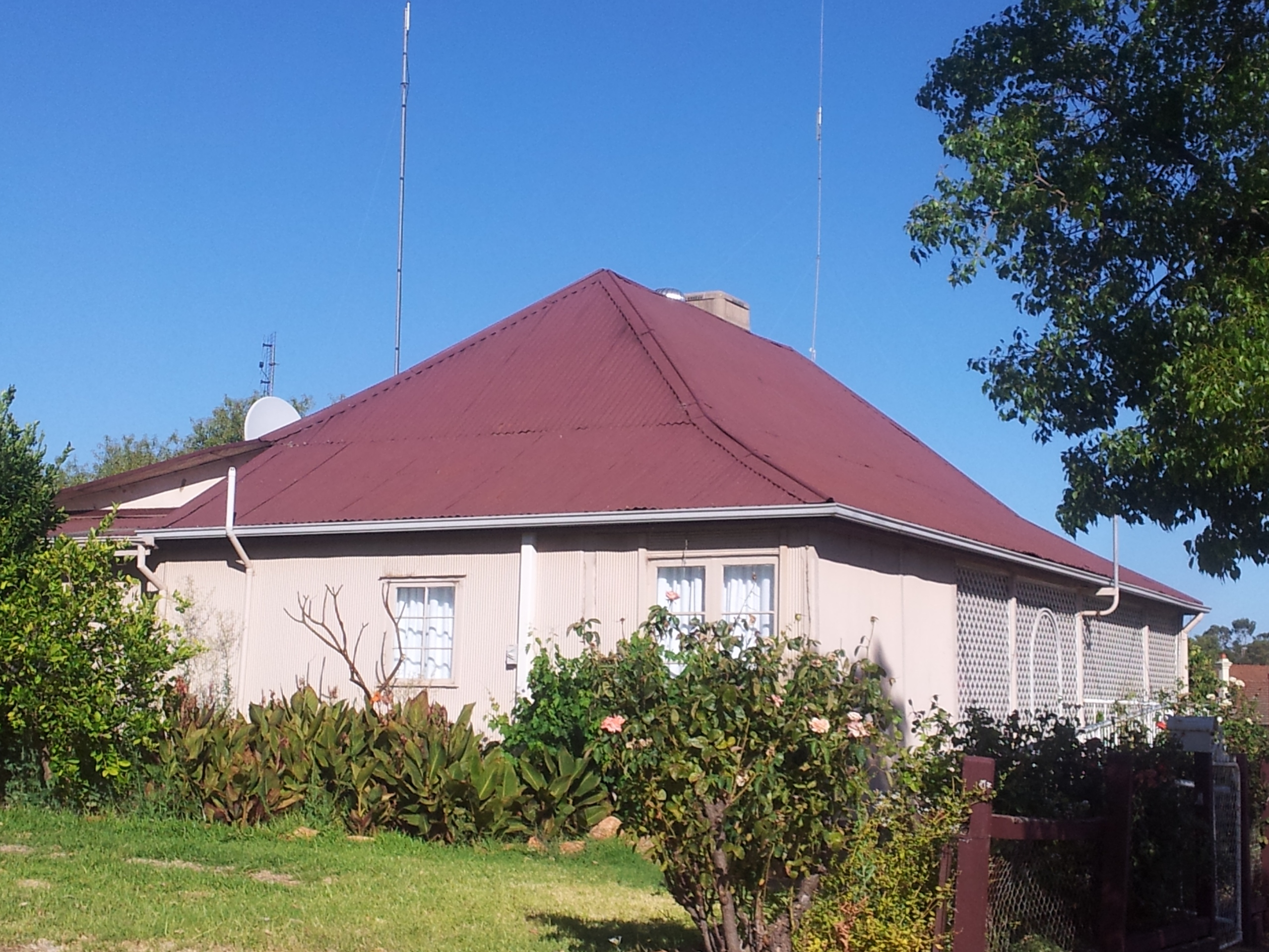
- Interactive map of the James Martin's Cottage area

General information
- Architectural style: Victorian vernacular
- Location: 95 Stirling Terrace, Toodyay
- Coordinates: 31°33′02″S 116°28′10″E
- Completed: c1890

References
- Toodyay municipal inventory

James Martin's cottage is located on Stirling Terrace in Toodyay, Western Australia.

It was originally a four-room construction that, unlike most on the street, was not built by convicts and was not on Pensioner Guards land. James Martin was one of four blacksmiths in Toodyay during the 1860s. He built the cottage around 1890 and lived there until his death. Martin's family lived on the property for many generations and it has since been an antiques shop and residence.
