= Toodyay Garage =

Petrol station building in Toodyay, Western Australia

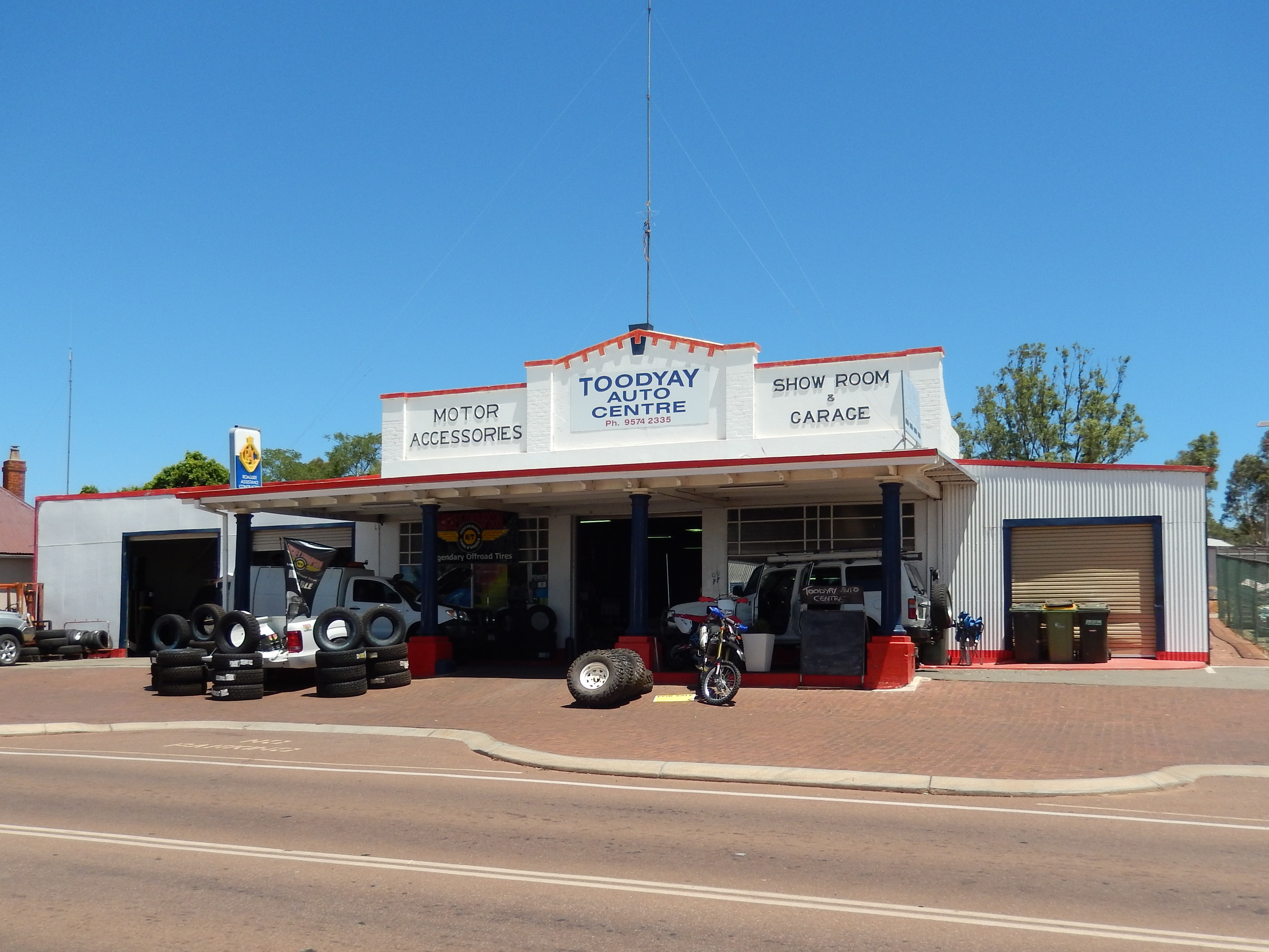
- Toodyay Garage in 2014
- Interactive map of the Toodyay Garage area
- Former names: Toodyay Motor Garage, Prince Bros, Toodyay Garage & Passenger Service, Prince & Booth, A Booth & Co, Gronow & Ayling, L.R. Ayling & Co, Buchan & Co, Guest Agencies, Toodyay Towing Service, Toodyay Auto Centre

General information
- Architectural style: Inter-war Classical-Art Deco influences
- Location: 97–99 Stirling Terrace, Toodyay
- Coordinates: 31.550495°S 116.469071°E
- Completed: 1926
- Renovated: 1953

The Toodyay Garage on Stirling Terrace in Toodyay, Western Australia was built in 1926 for Charles Henry Doust, and opened in February 1927.

== History ==
Architects Oldham, Boas and Ednie Brown designed the Toodyay Motor Garage for Doust, and it was built by local firm A James & Co. at a cost of £1,200. Vernon Hamersley "in the presence of a hundred or so residents" officially opened the building in February 1927. It was built as a single storey garage workshop with a prominent Art Deco style parapet. It appears that the business did not prosper as it was advertised in a mortgagee sale notice in 1928. It is described as:

Part of Lot 8 of Toodyay Sub. Lot 5 [...] Modern Garage and Showroom, with brick front and the rear of G.I., the whole covering about 2,500 sq. ft., subdivided into office, stockroom, showroom, and well-designed service garage. The front is of attractive appearance, and provision is made for petrol service under a large canopy supported on concrete pillars. The floor is of concrete; wash down and electric light installed.

In 1928 the garage was taken over by Ken Somers, (Note: Doust and Somers were both involved in motor transport before the Toodyay Garage was built. Both are described in the Western Australian Post Office Directories as motor coach drivers or proprietors. In 1923 it was reported that Doust had just taken delivery of his third Hupmobile. Somers favoured the Nash.) who ran the business until his death in 1939. He offered a variety of taxi and self-drive services. A daily service to and from Perth was available, and cars could be hired with or without drivers.

In March 1932 the Toodyay Cycle Club was formed at a meeting of cyclists at the garage. Somers was the inaugural president.

In 1939 Somers died, aged 44 years, from serious burns received in a fire at the garage. After his death the property was offered for sale at auction on 18 July 1940, but it appears that it did not sell and it remained closed until 1945.

The property was again offered for sale (by tender) in September 1945. Brothers Charles Herbert Prince and Saul Prince bought the unoccupied garage premises after their return from the war and operated a business under the name of Prince Brothers.

Saul Prince sold his share to Arthur Booth c. 1946 and the business operated as Prince and Booth.

In addition to mechanical services, fuel supplies and numerous agencies (including International Harvester Co., Goldbrough Mort & Co, Mortlock Bros. and Western Assurance), in 1946 Prince and Booth started the Toodyay Garage and Passenger Service, a daily bus passenger service to Perth. On 2 June 1947 the Toodyay Garage and Passenger Service commenced using a new International powered parlour coach (Miss Toodyay) on its daily Toodyay-Perth service. The old bus, Recco, was farewelled after travelling 140,000 miles in two years. Radio was installed in Miss Toodyay to entertain the passengers on the two-hour journey. On 8 February 1950 Miss Toodyay II (a Panhard diesel made in France) arrived, having been driven to W.A. from Melbourne. It was the only one of its kind in Australia, and was a 6 1/2-ton vehicle (with pale blue and cream interior) able to carry 37 passengers. Two months later, on 18 April, the company announced a reduction of its service to Perth via the Red Hill Road to Tuesdays only due to the bad state of the road.

An additional service was offered from 1947 when a hay baling machine worked by only two men and capable of baling 27 tons of hay a day was purchased by Prince & Booth.

In 1951 Prince and Booth sold the bus service, Toodyay Garage and Passenger Service, to the Western Australian Government Railways and Miss Toodyay II made its last run to Perth on 28 January at 6 pm. It was noted in the press that:

As from Tuesday, 30th January 1951, the Perth-Toodyay Bus Service at present operated by Messrs. Prince and Booth has been acquired by the Western Australian Government Railways Commission. From this date the service will be included in our existing service and the following amended time table will apply:

In 1953 the Toodyay Road Board approved Prince & Booth's plans and specifications for the erection of a lubritorium adjacent to the Toodyay Garage on Stirling Terrace.

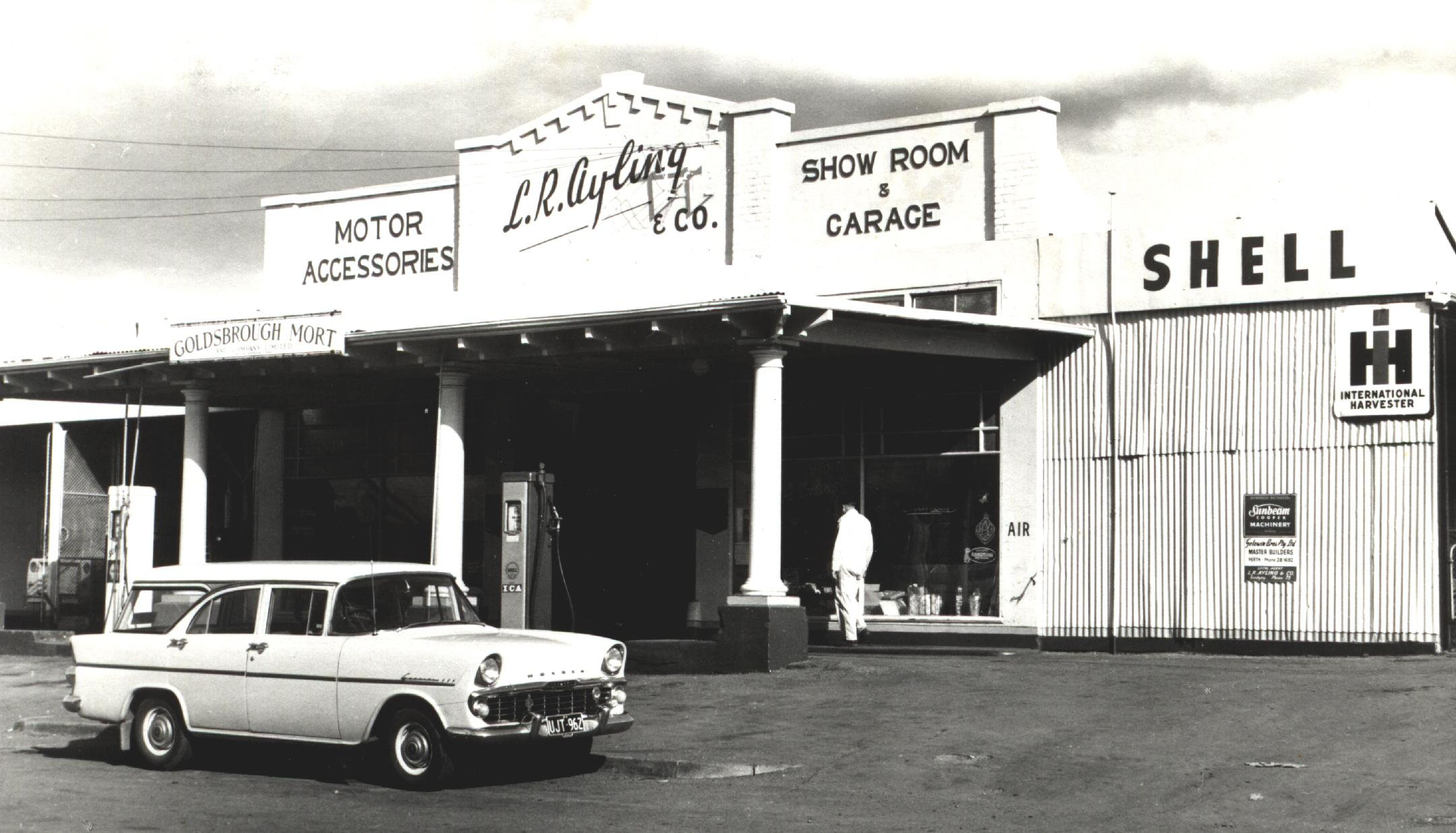
c. 1960: L. R. Ayling & Co.

In the early 1950s Prince sold his share of the business to Booth and it then operated as A Booth & Co. In 1955 it was taken over by Ron Gronow and Leo Ayling, and in 1957 became L.R. Ayling & Co. It was operated by Ayling until his death in 1980 and was then sold to Murray Buchan.

The business was subsequently sold to Michael Guest (Guest Agencies) and Russell and Keith Chrimes (Toodyay Towing Service, Toodyay Auto Centre).

In 2014 the building continues to operate as a garage, with the original façade little changed and the original shop windows having been retained.
