= Shoemaker's House =

Historic building in Toodyay, Western Australia

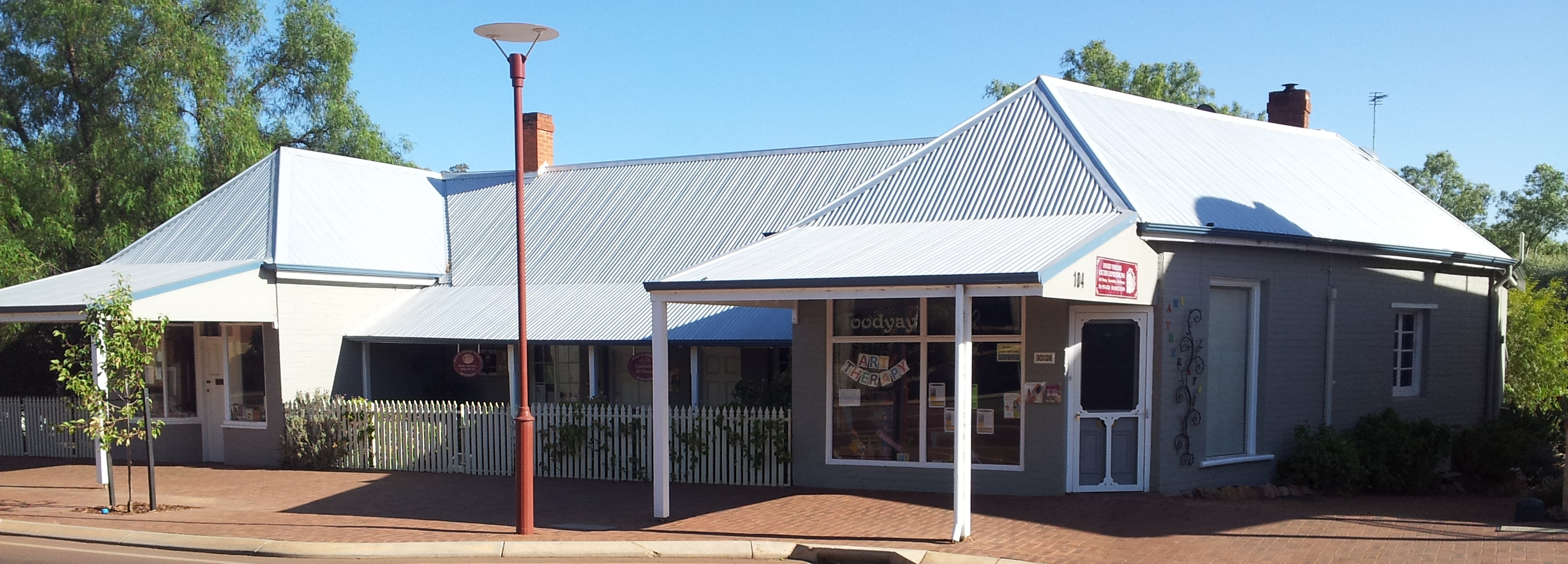
- Interactive map of the Shoemaker's House area
- Alternative names: Ellery's shop & dwelling

General information
- Architectural style: Victorian Vernacular
- Location: 104 Stirling Terrace, Toodyay, Western Australia, Australia
- Coordinates: 31.5500°S 116.4686°E
- Completed: 1870s

References
- Toodyay municipal inventory

Shoemaker's House was constructed in the 1870s, in what is now Toodyay, Western Australia on Stirling Terrace.

Shoemaker's House is a unique building having two shops linked by a dwelling that is slightly set back. This was one of Daniel Connor's first commercial developments in the region and he intended to lease it from the beginning. It was later owned by Charles Ellery.
