= Western Australian Bank Building, Toodyay =

Historic bank building in Toodyay, Western Australia

Western Australian Bank, Newcastle (fmr)
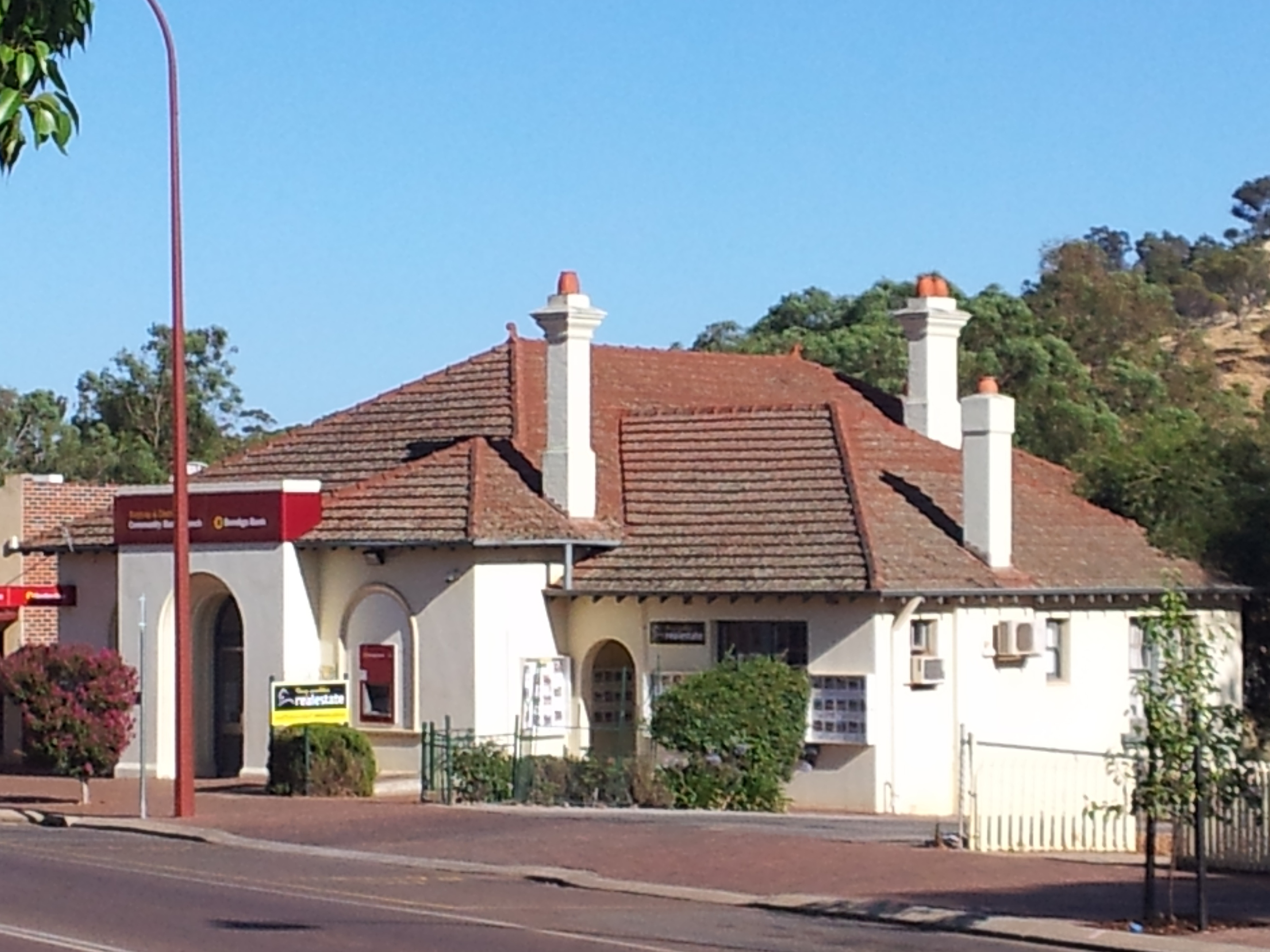
- Interactive map of the Western Australian Bank, Newcastle (fmr) area
- Former names: Bank of New South Wales, Westpac Bank, Challenge Bank
- Alternative names: Bendigo Bank

General information
- Architectural style: originally Federation Bungalow, additions of Inter-war Art Deco influence
- Location: 108 Stirling Terrace, Toodyay
- Coordinates: 31.5500°S 116.4681°E
- Completed: 1897-1898
- Renovated: 1948

Design and construction
- Architect: Joseph John Talbot Hobbs

References
- Toodyay municipal inventory

Western Australian Bank, Newcastle was the name of a bank building that is on Stirling Terrace in Toodyay, Western Australia.

It was constructed in 1897-98 as an office for the bank and a residence for the bank manager and his family, replacing Butterly House. The architect was JJ Talbot Hobbs. Imported French tiles were installed on the roof. James Mitchell, who later became the 13th Premier of Western Australia was bank manager here in 1898. Other early bank managers were A.G. Franklin, James Johnson, F.J.G. Miller, H.T. Weston, C.G. Rhead, H.S. Campbell and A.S. Overington.

On 28 March 1927 the Western Australian Bank amalgamated with the Bank of New South Wales. The premises were enlarged and modernised in 1948. In 1982 the Bank of New South Wales changed its name to the Westpac Banking Corporation; in 1996 the building was occupied by Challenge Bank and from 2000 the Bendigo Bank.

The building has been a continuously operating banking facility in Toodyay since it first opened in the late nineteenth century. It is a single storey rendered brick and tile roofed building with prominent painted brick chimneys. There is an extension to the rear with timbered board and a tiled roof on brick plinth.
