= St Philip's Church, Culham =

Coordinates: 31.455505°S 116.437228°E

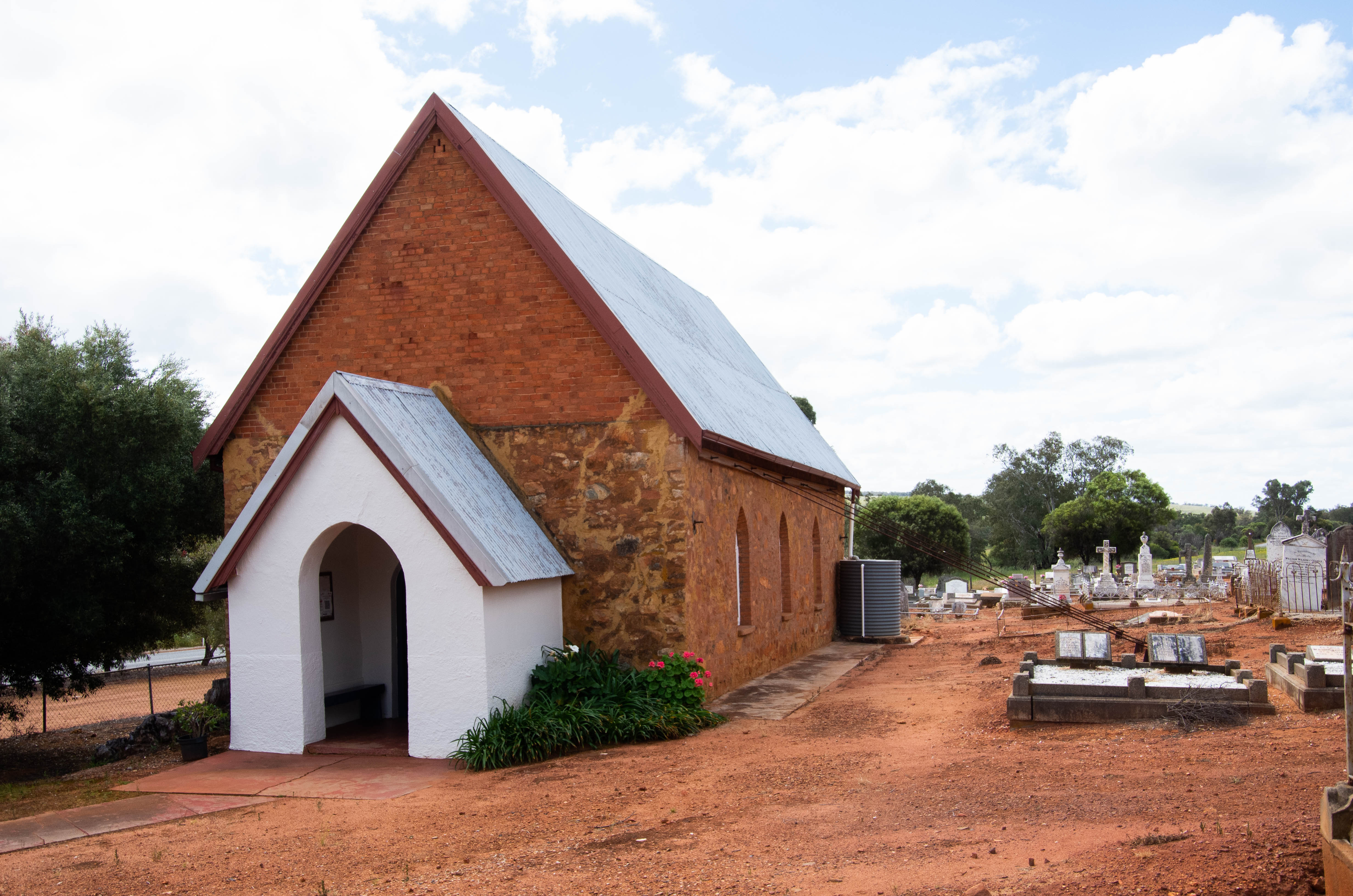
St Philip Church and cemetery

Saint Philip Church in Culham, Western Australia is (as of 2021) the second oldest active Anglican church in Western Australia. It is located in the Parish of Toodyay—Goomalling, on the Bindi Bindi–Toodyay Road. The church ground includes a cemetery, which continues to accept burials, though there are restrictions on who can be buried there.

== Building ==
In 1849 Bishop Short, the first Bishop of Adelaide visited family in Culham, as his diocese included Western Australia. He recognised the need for church in the area. His brother-in-law Samuel Pole Phillips donated 12 acres of land for the church and started a fund to pay for its construction. Construction commenced in 1850, with the first service held in the church in April 1853. When the Phillips family returned to England worked stopped on the church and it fell into disrepair. When they returned, the work recommenced and the church was officially opened on 19 July 1857. Phillips died in 1901 and was buried in the cemetery.
