= Stationmaster's House (Toodyay) =

House in Toodyay, Western Australia

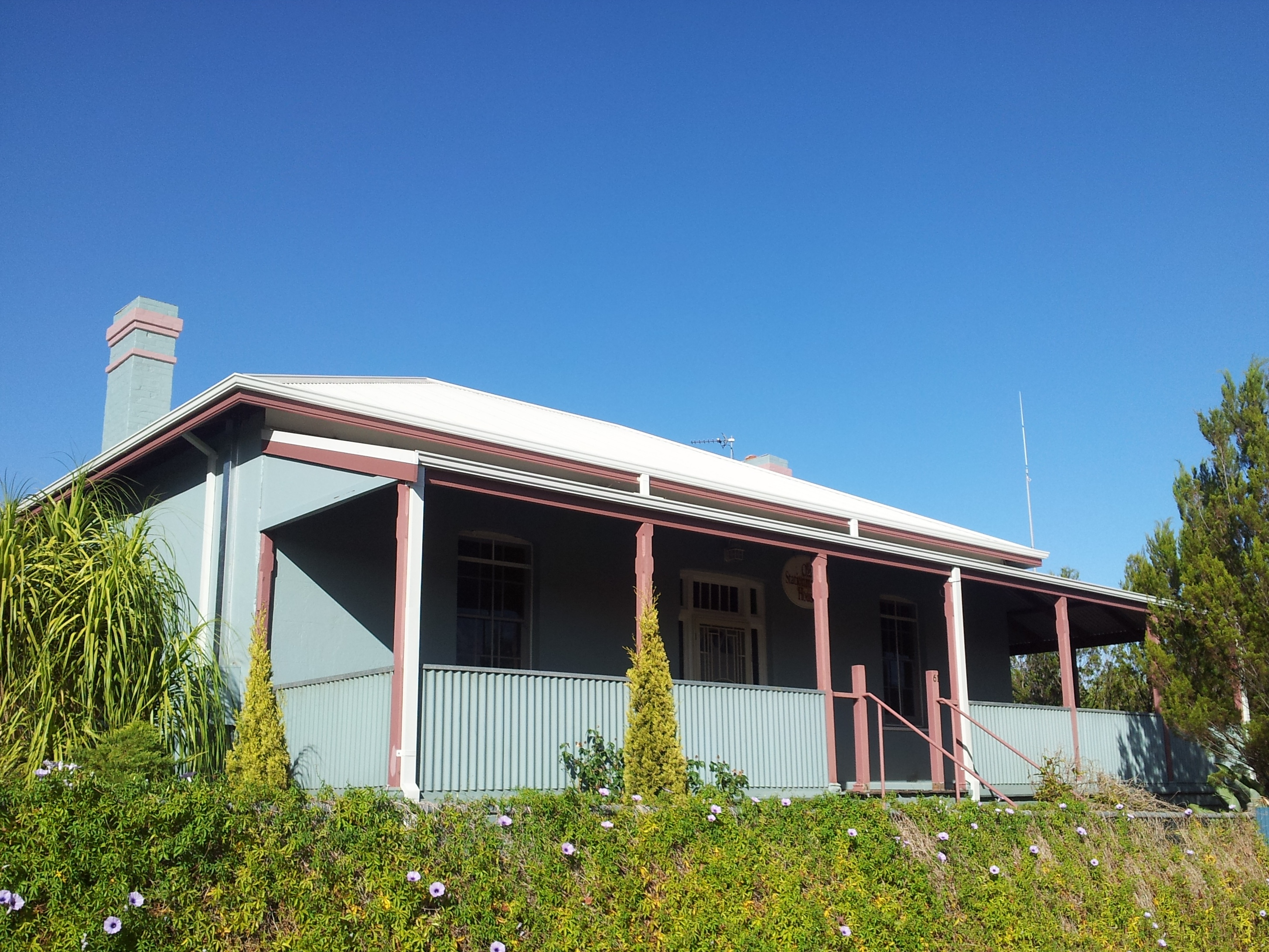
- Stationmaster's House, Toodyay
- Interactive map of the Stationmaster's House area

General information
- Architectural style: Federation Bungalow
- Location: 61 Stirling Terrace, Toodyay
- Completed: 1895

Design and construction
- Architect: Public Works Department of W.A.

References
- Toodyay municipal inventory

The Stationmaster's House on Stirling Terrace, Toodyay, Western Australia was built in 1895.

This single storey painted brick dwelling with brick chimneys and corrugated iron roof has been restored. The front and side verandah has timber posts and panelling, and timber framed sash windows. There is also a half glazed door with fanlights and margin panes in keeping with the age of the property.

This house was completed in time for the new railway station that opened in 1896 on the southern edge of town. The original railhead, established in 1888, was located directly opposite the Roman Catholic Church Group of buildings even further south of the town-site. The Station Master's Residence is today one of the few railway buildings or infrastructure elements still intact along the Clackline-Toodyay-Miling railway line.

The Stationmaster's House was renovated following a fire in 2011, with the works completed in 2012. The building is currently used as a toy museum and gift shop.
