= Butterly House =

Heritage building in Toodyay, Western Australia

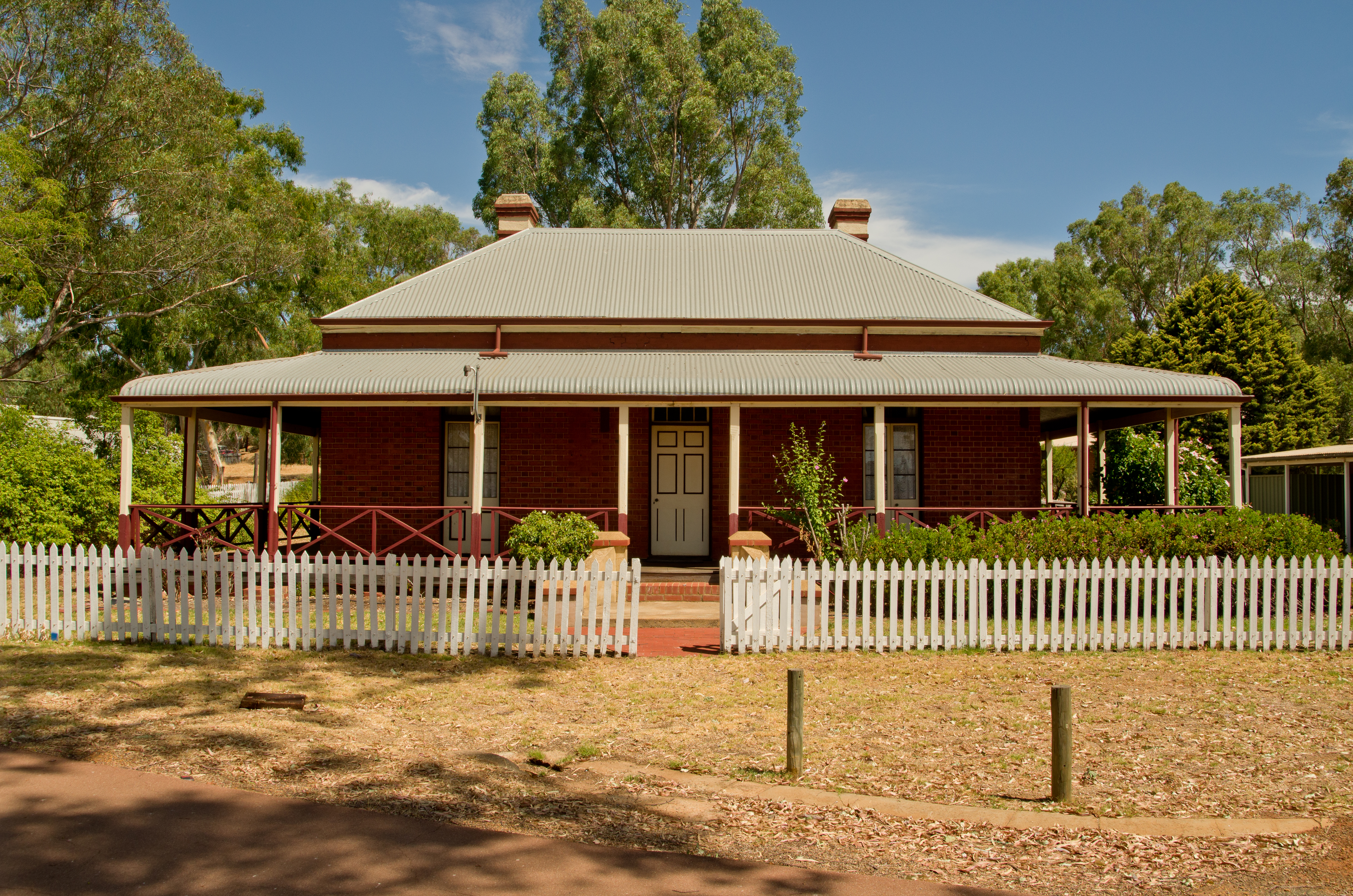
- Harper Road view
- Interactive map of the Butterly House area
- Former names: Monger's Cottage

General information
- Architectural style: Victorian Georgian
- Location: 1A‐D Harper Road (at the corner of Stirling Terrace), Toodyay, Western Australia, Australia
- Coordinates: 31.55059°S 116.4641°E
- Completed: c.1870
- Renovated: 1889 conversion to bank. 1910 extensive remodelling with new roof and verandahs added 1990 restoration to circa 1930 appearance

Height
- Height: Single storey

Design and construction
- Main contractor: 1910 Harry Davey

Western Australia Heritage Register
- Designated: 7 April 1995
- Reference no.: 3253

Butterly House, also known as Monger's Cottage, is located at 1A-D Harper Road, Toodyay, Western Australia. The building was the location of the first bank in Toodyay.

== History ==
The land was bought by J.G.C. Carr in 1860. The original dwelling was constructed by John Henry Monger circa 1870, on Town Lot #1. His son, Charles Samuel Monger, resided in the dwelling and operated the family store located opposite the house and adjacent to the Bolgart Bridge (crossing the Avon River). In 1889 the building was converted to accommodate the Western Australian Bank. This was the first bank in Toodyay. The manager of the Northam Branch, James Mitchell, who later became the Premier of Western Australia and Governor of Western Australia, rode over twice a week to also manage the Toodyay branch. In 1898 the bank vacated the premises, moving into a newly constructed premises on Stirling Terrace, and the Monger family resumed occupancy. In 1910 the residence was acquired by Mr Angus and Mrs Emma Butterly (née Monger), who undertook extensive remodelling of the dwelling. From 1954 to 1980 the cottage was owned and occupied by Miss Kathleen Gladys Butterly, who sold the house and land to the Shire of Toodyay in 1981. In March 1981, the Shire Council leased Butterly House to the Toodyay Homes for the Aged Association (now Butterly Cottages Association (Inc.)). In 1997 the Association received a grant from the Heritage Council and in 1998 funding from the Lotteries Commission to restore the building. In 1999 the building was officially re-opened and is used by the Association for recreation and as a living museum with collections of photographs and memorabilia.

== Architectural style ==
Butterly House is a six-roomed Victorian Georgian-styled dwelling. It has a U-shaped hipped roof, originally shingled and now corrugated iron, with symmetrically placed brick chimneys and is encircled by a hipped bullnosed iron verandah with simple timber columns. Brickwork is in Flemish bond, the earliest surviving example of this type in Toodyay. It has a symmetrical facade with a centrally placed panelled door and French windows opening onto the verandah.

== Heritage value ==
Butterly House was classified by the National Trust of Australia (WA) on 3 March 1992, and entered into the Register of the National Estate by the Australian Heritage Commission on 30 June 1992.

The building was also permanently entered on the State Heritage Register by the Heritage Council of Western Australia on 7 April 1995 and is listed on the Shire of Toodyay's Municipal Inventory.
