= Western Australian Bank =

Nineteenth century bank in Western Australia

- Founded: June 26, 1841; 185 years ago
- Defunct: March 1927
- Fate: Acquired by and absorbed into Bank of New South Wales
- Headquarters: Perth, Western Australia, Australia

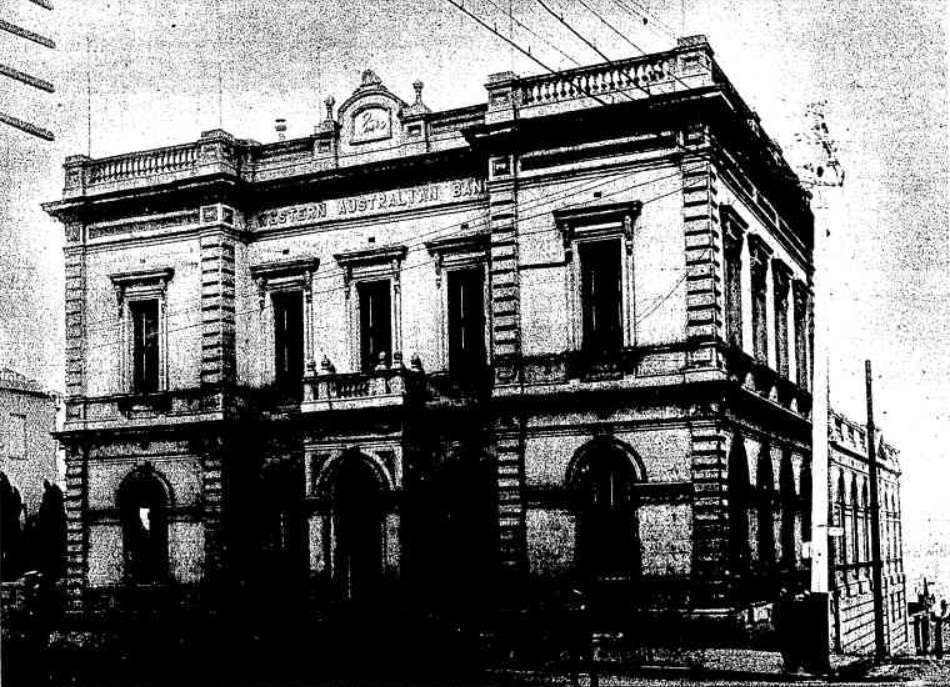
Former Western Australian Bank headquarters, demolished 1970s

The Western Australian Bank was a bank operating in Western Australia from 1841 to 1927.

It was formed amidst the aftermath of the sale of the first Bank of Western Australia (1837–1841), which had sold out to the Bank of Australasia, as prominent colonists dissatisfied with the sale of the local bank to an English institution immediately responded by establishing a new rival banking operation. It was ultimately established on 26 June 1841 with a subscribed capital of £2,000. Its prospectus referred to the earlier bank as having "resolved (by a majority of six votes only) to commit an act of unnecessary and gratuitous suicide."

It engaged in a period of fierce competition with the Bank of Western Australia, which saw the earlier bank close entirely in 1845. It began operating regional branches from the 1850s, beginning with York (1855), and was the first bank to open on the Western Australian goldfields when it opened at Coolgardie in 1894. It was one of the few Australian banks to not close its doors during the 1893 banking crisis.

The bank's first premises were located in an adapted house on the corner of Pier Street and St Georges Terrace, Perth (later the location of St Andrew's Church). It moved to new premises further west along St George's Terrace in 1846 and in 1886 built a permanent headquarters on the corner of William Street and St George's Terrace, being based there until the bank's closure.

The Western Australian Bank was purchased by the Bank of New South Wales in March 1927 for £2,012,500 (equivalent to $180,000,000 in 2022). This was the first merger or absorption by that establishment. It had a network of eighty branches across Western Australia at the time of the amalgamation.

== Historic buildings ==
A number of former bank branches are now heritage-listed:

- Western Australian Bank Building, Albany
- Western Australian Bank Building, Bunbury
- Western Australian Bank Building, Cue
- Westpac Bank Building, Fremantle (former Western Australian Bank)
- Western Australian Bank Building, Kalgoorlie
- Western Australian Bank Building, Midland
- Western Australian Bank Building, Northam
- Western Australian Bank Building, Toodyay
