= Stirling Terrace, Toodyay =

Street in Toodyay, Western Australia

Stirling Terrace Western Australia
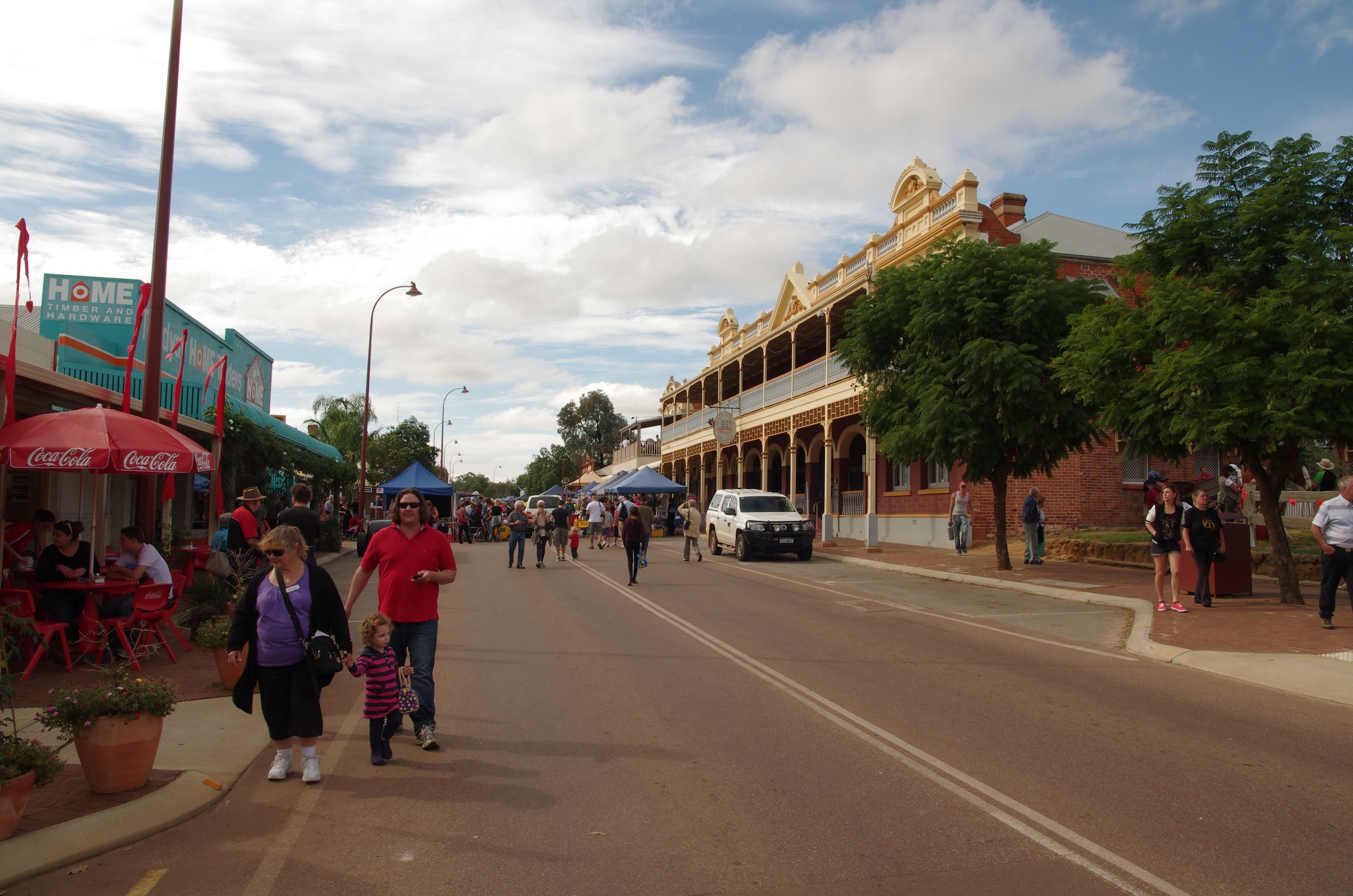
- Looking down Stirling Terrace during the Moondyne Festival

General information
- Type: Street
- Length: 1.3 km (0.8 mi)

Major junctions
- Southeast end: Toodyay Road; Goomalling Toodyay Road
- Northwest end: Telegraph Road; Harper Road

Location(s)
- Suburb(s): Toodyay

Stirling Terrace is the main street of Toodyay, Western Australia, originally called New Road until 1905.

== Route description ==
From the intersection of Toodyay Road and Goomalling Toodyay Road, Stirling Terrace travels north-west through the town for 1.3 kilometres (0.81 mi), to the west of the Avon River. At the street's north-western end, through-traffic can continue north via Telegraph Road and Bindi Bindi–Toodyay Road to Bindi Bindi, or west via Harper Road and Julimar Road to Chittering.

=== Buildings ===
A considerable number of heritage properties are found on the terrace. The historic frontage of residences, shops and other buildings along Stirling Terrace is collectively termed the Stirling Terrace Streetscape Group. The State Register of Heritage Buildings includes Connor's Mill, Toodyay Public Library (built 1874), the old Toodyay Post Office (designed by George Temple-Poole and built 1897) and the old Toodyay Fire Station (designed by Ken Duncan, built 1938). Buildings listed on the Australian Heritage Database include Freemasons Hotel (built 1861), the Victoria Hotel (late 1890s), Robert Urwin's Drapery, and St Stephens Anglican Church.

A number of other buildings are along the road:

- Butterly House
- Catholic Presbytery, Toodyay
- Connor's Cottage
- Connor's House
- Demasson's House and Shop
- Dr Growse's House
- Ellery's Arcade
- Freemasons Hotel (Toodyay)
- Hackett's (Pensioner) Cottage
- Jager Stores
- James Martin's Cottage
- Kirk's (Pensioner) Cottage
- Leeder's House
- Roman Catholic Church Group, Toodyay
- Shoemaker's House
- St Aloysius Convent boys dormitory, Toodyay
- St Aloysius Convent girls dormitory, Toodyay
- St Aloysius Convent of Mercy
- St John the Baptist Church, Toodyay
- St John the Baptist Church, Toodyay (1863–1963)
- Stationmaster's House (Toodyay)
- Stirling House
- Toodyay Garage
- Toodyay Memorial Hall
- Toodyay Tavern
- Urwin's Store
- Victoria Billiard Saloon
- Wendouree Tearooms
- Western Australian Bank, Newcastle Branch

== History ==
The name Stirling Terrace was adopted at a Newcastle Municipal Council meeting in May 1905. Following discussion of a motion to rename the town's main road, two names were voted on: Bedford Terrace, after Governor Bedford, and Stirling Terrace, after the former Governor Stirling. The votes were split 3–3, so Mayor Henry Davey cast the deciding vote for Stirling Terrace. The change in name was officially made on 3 May 1911.

In 2009 the upgrading from federal and state funding was completed.

The northern end of the street, in the vicinity of the Avon Bridge, is a popular walking spot for tourists.

== Major intersections ==
LGA	Location	km	mi	Destinations	Notes
Toodyay	Toodyay	0.0	0.0	Goomalling-Toodyay Road – Goomalling, Gidgegannup, Northam, Perth	Southeastern terminus. Continues as Toodyay Road
Toodyay	Toodyay	0.1	0.062	Hamersley Street	
Toodyay	Toodyay	1.2	0.75	Piesse Street	Access to Toodyay railway station
Toodyay	Toodyay	1.3	0.81	Harper Road – Julimar, Bolgart, Bindoon, Gingin	Northwestern terminus at t-junction. Continues northwards as Telegraph Road
1.000 mi = 1.609 km; 1.000 km = 0.621 mi

== See also ==
- Major roads in the Wheatbelt region of Western Australia
