= Freemasons Hotel (Toodyay) =

Hotel in Toodyay, Western Australia

Coordinates: 31°33′00″S 116°27′58″E

Toodyay Hotel
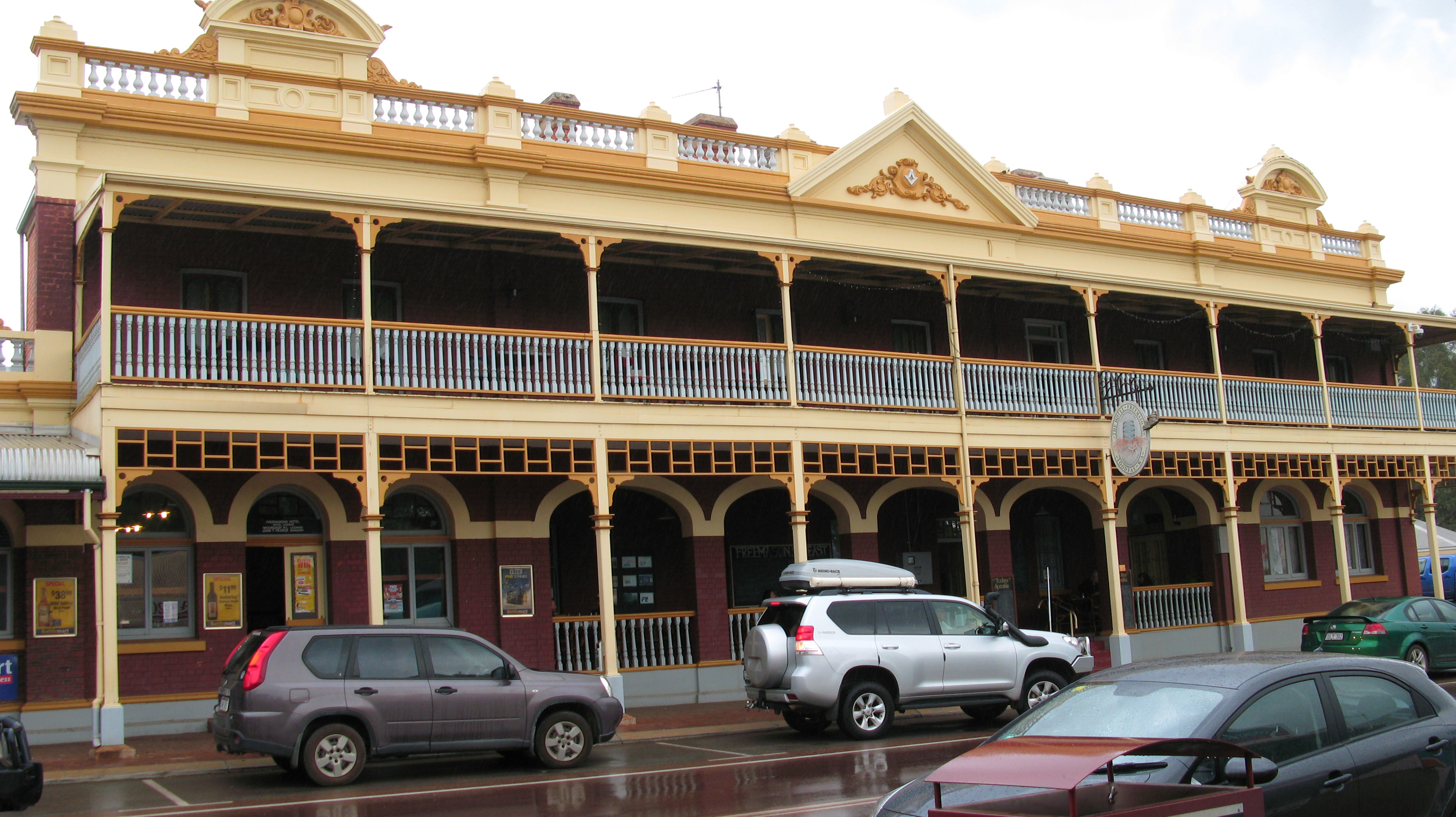
- Former names: Newcastle Hotel, Freemason Tavern and Newcastle Hotel, Freemasons Hotel

General information
- Architectural style: Federation Filigree
- Location: 125-127 Stirling Terrace, Toodyay
- Completed: 1860
- Renovated: 1896, 1903, 1994

Design and construction
- Architect: James William Wright (1903)
- Main contractor: H Davey (1896)

Website
- www.freemasonshoteltoodyay.com

References
- Toodyay municipal inventory

Freemasons Hotel, now Toodyay Hotel, is a historic building on Stirling Terrace in Toodyay, Western Australia. It was built for William Tregoning, and originally licensed in 1861 as the Newcastle Hotel. The building was classified by the National Trust, and is listed on both the Register of the National Estate and the Australian Heritage Database.

== History ==
The first owner of the hotel was William Penphrase Tregoning, a publican formally of York and Beverley. In 1860 Tregoning bought at auction lots 6, 7, 8 and 14 in the new town of Newcastle. Three weeks later on 24 October 1860 he called for tenders to build a 15-room hotel. A single storey public house with stables and a large enclosure was constructed and Tregoning was granted a license in the name of the Newcastle Hotel in April 1861.

In 1862 Tregoning sold the hotel to Thomas Mead of Northam for two thousand pounds.

That same year J.T. Monger opened a second hotel at the southern end of Stirling Terrace, also naming it the Newcastle Hotel. (Later it was renamed the Toodyay Tavern). Due to a hiatus caused by a change of ownership of the first Newcastle Hotel, the new owner Thomas Mead, was forced to bestow the name "Freemasons' Tavern and Newcastle Hotel" on the older public house.

Water supplies were a constant issue in Toodyay. When the town well ran dry in 1869 permission was given by the Freemasons' Hotel licensees, Samuel and James Gregg, for people to draw their drinking water from the private well behind the hotel. It was equipped with a pump and was used often.

The Gregg brothers were also promoters of the Newcastle Co‐operative Stores Company launched in 1868. The store was set up in the long room of the hotel after they obtained the Colonial Secretary's permission for this dealing. Samuel Gregg subsequently became the sole licensee of the hotel and James the manager of the store. Toodyay Roads Board meetings were held in the hotel on the first Saturday of each month, designed to coincide with shopping day in town.

In 1871, a tea meeting and concert at the hotel, organised by Rev. Innes formed a young men's reading club, with James Drummond chairing the meeting. It was said to be the biggest social event ever held in Toodyay. In 1875, the well behind the hotel was closed for public use when the new proprietor Michael Ryan declared a charge of one pound per person for its use. At the end of 1880 the hotel was sold to Thomas Donegan, who soon sold it to his brother, James.

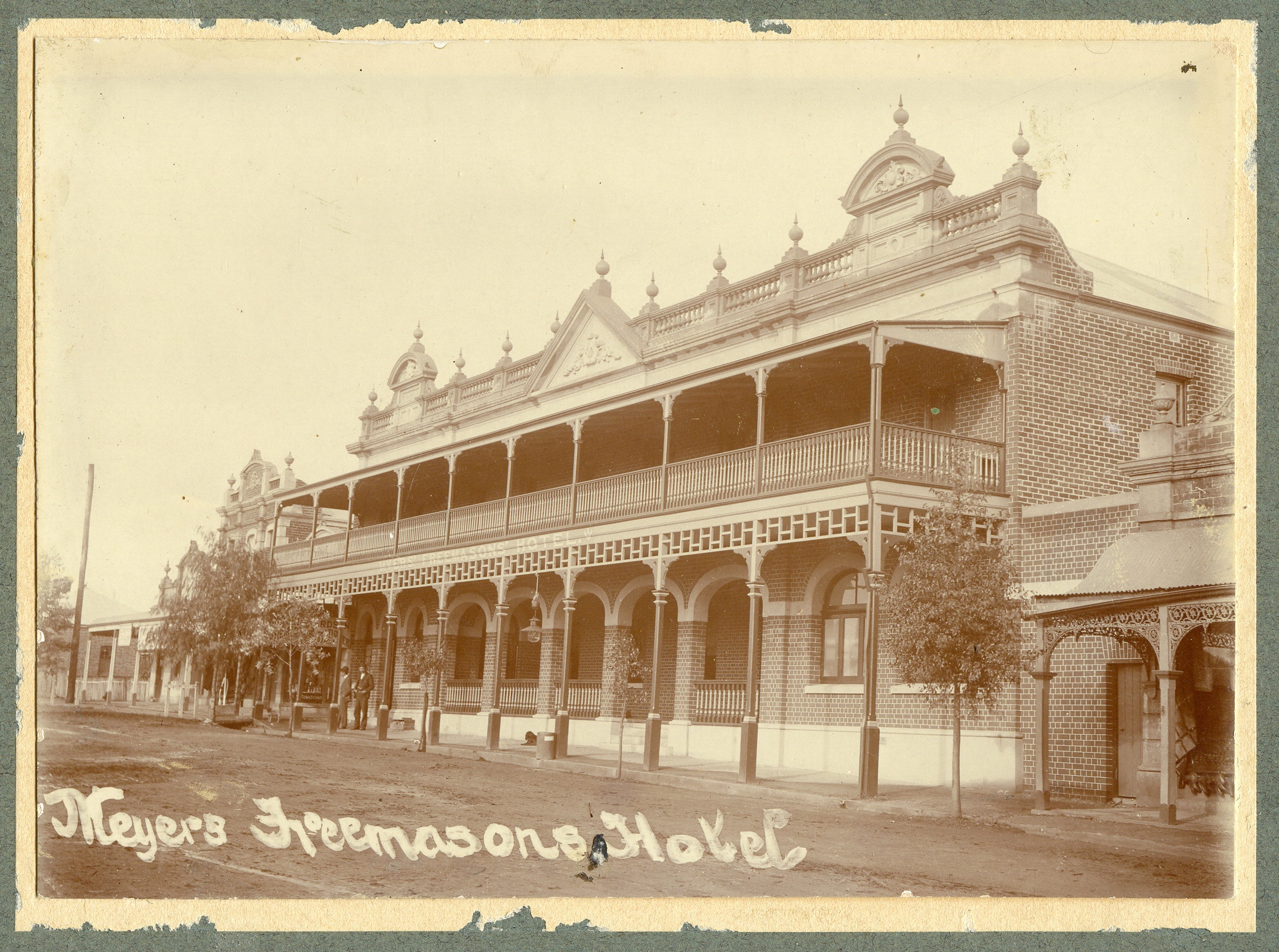
Freemasons Hotel, Toodyay, 1904-1910

In 1890, builder H. Davey Jnr. purchased the hotel, later re-roofing and redecorating the premises and adding a billiard room. Davey also sold the water from the well to the hospital at a rate of half a crown a cask. In 1899 Davey built a single storey shop adjoining the hotel. In 1904, proprietor E.J. Myers extended the front to the street line and added a second storey. On 4 December 1908 the Freemasons Hotel hosted a luncheon for the Governor of Western Australia, Frederick Bedford, when he was invited to commemorate the commencement of construction for the Newcastle–Bolgart Railway.

The adjoining shop built by Davey eventually became part of the hotel. Prior to this it was utilised as a hairdressing salon, tobacconist, news agency, chemist, photographer's establishment and SP betting shop. It was also a Ladies Club before it was incorporated into the hotel to become the saloon bar.

In March 2017, the hotel underwent significant restoration work, with the owner spending A$100,000 on the creation of a new sports bar, TAB (betting) facilities, Foxtel, and a new beer garden at the back.

== Description ==
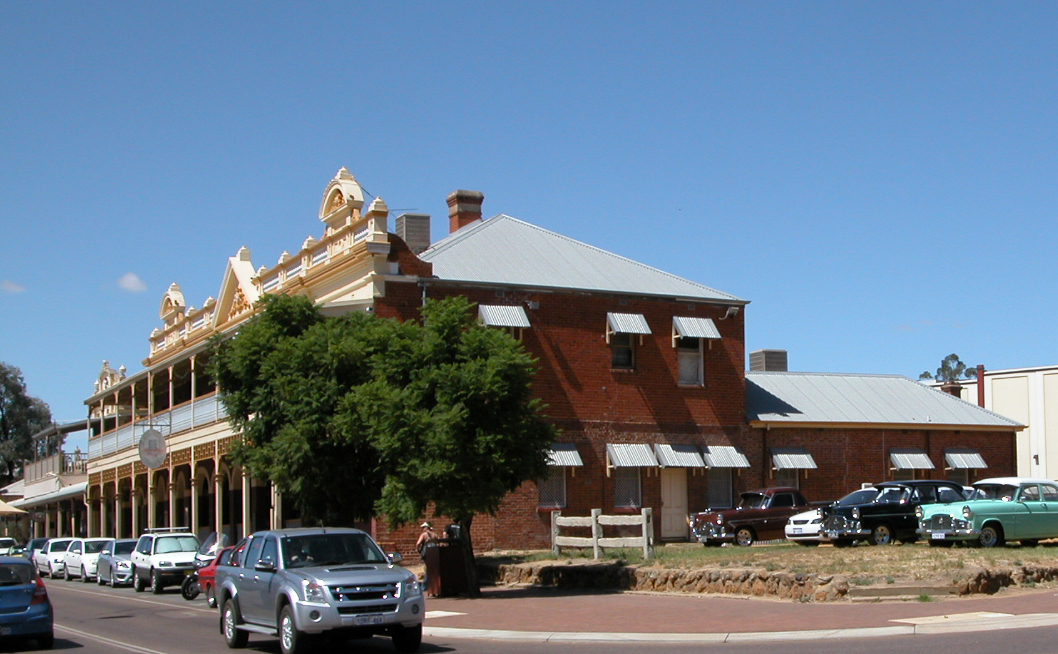
Freemasons Hotel, Toodyay, 2012

The building is a double-height red brick structure with corrugated iron roof and a decorative parapet of classical influence. There are verandahs at ground and first floor levels with timber posts and balustrades. The ground level also has an additional set back verandah with brick columns and arches. There is a rear verandah to both upper and lower levels and a single storey brick extension. The building's Federation Filigree façade was restored in 1994.

== Heritage listings ==
The building was added to the Western Australia Heritage Register on 1 December 2012; and was added to non-statutory lists by the West Australian branch of the National Trust on 7 June 1977 and to the now defunct Register of the National Estate on 21 October 1980.

== 21st century ==
In 2023 a company linked to the family of former WA premier Colin Barnett (2008–2017) bought the hotel from Stella and John Pearce, who had owned the hotel for 33 years.

Today the building operates as the Toodyay Hotel. It reopened on 2 April 2024 after a period of closure.
