= Toodyay, Western Australia =

Town in southwestern Australia

Toodyay
- Town
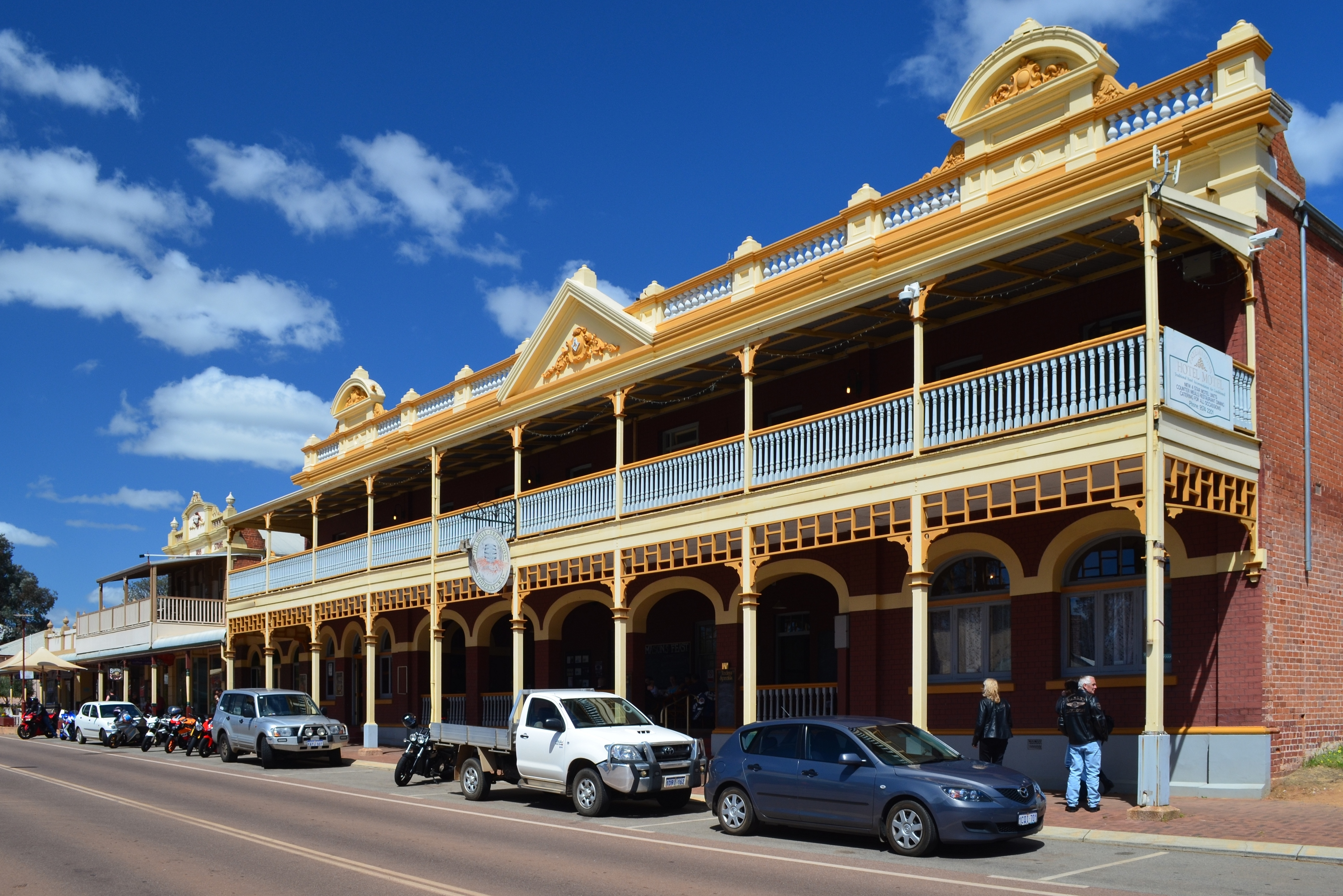
- View of Stirling Terrace, 2013

- Interactive map of Toodyay
- Coordinates: 31°33′S 116°27′E
- Country: Australia
- State: Western Australia
- LGA: Shire of Toodyay
- Location: 25 km (16 mi) NW of Northam; 85 km (53 mi) NE of Perth
- Established: 1860

Government
  - State electorate: Central Wheatbelt
  - Federal division: Bullwinkel

Area
  - Total: 62.4 km^{2} (24.1 sq mi)

Population
  - Total: 953 (UCL 2021)
- Postcode: 6566

Toodyay (/ˈtuːdʒeɪ/, Nyungar: Duidgee), known as Newcastle between 1860 and 1910, is a town on the Avon River in the Wheatbelt region of Western Australia, 85 kilometres (53 mi) north-east of Perth. The first European settlement occurred in the area in 1836. After flooding in the 1850s, the townsite was moved to its current location in the 1860s. Initially Toodyay was located in what is now West Toodyay before repeated flooding caused the town centre to migrate to the area around the Newcastle convict depot creating the town of Newcastle. After approximately 50 years of confusion the name of Newcastle was changed to Toodyay and the original Toodyay became known as West Toodyay.

It is connected by railway and road to Perth. During the 1860s, it was home to bushranger Moondyne Joe.

== History ==
=== Origin of the name Toodyay ===
The meaning of the name is uncertain, although it is probably indigenous Noongar in origin. In an 1834 reference it is transcribed as 'Toodye' while maps in 1836 referred to Duidgee The Shire of Toodyay's official website says that;

[t]he name Toodyay is believed to be derived from an Aboriginal word "Duidgee" which means "place of plenty", referring to the richness and fertility of the area and the reliability of the Avon River [...].

This meaning appears to be a long-standing belief in the local community, but may be based on an interpretation of an explanation by an Aboriginal guide about the value of the location rather than the literal meaning of the word.

In 1929 during Western Australia's centennial year, Victor Riseley published an article in The Sunday Times in response to other publications during the year that had tried to define its origins. Riseley contended that the definition of "beautiful", while the perfect description of the region, was not a descriptive for which the Ballardong people had any use, as their place names were related to the necessities of daily life. Riseley concluded that Toodyay was derived from Toodyeep, the name of the wife of one of the trackers who accompanied George Fletcher Moore in 1836 to the valley known as Gabbia-Yandirt.

Another possible origin is that toodyay is derived from an account written by James Drummond of a party taking up land grants in the region in 1836. As they proceeded onto Drummond's grant, and finding an area of good land and water, their guide Babbing said the area was known as Duidgee. This area was said to be a favourite of the Ballardong people because of the abundance of reed mace, whose thick roots are a good source of starch and mucilage.

An alternative meaning was ascribed by a research project headed by Leonard Collard which provides the meaning as "today it is misty and foggy". Yet another version was more recently postulated by local anthropologists Ken Macintyre and Barb Dobson, who provide a very erudite analysis which says that the name most likely mimics a birdcall from a bird such as the restless flycatcher (Myiagra inquieta) which is said to sound like duidjee-duidjee or toodjee-toodjee. This bird is found commonly in the region as well as the Canning region where Babbing grew up. Anthropologists Ken Macintyre and Barb Dobson speculate that Babbing was describing the sound of a bird. Drummond didn't enquire into the meaning of the word, as he did for other words during his account of the 1836 journey. Macintyre and Dobson note that Toodyeep was from the area but that Aboriginal people were named after the place where they were born or raised rather than the place being named after them and therefore dismiss this as a possible origin for the name Toodyay.

By 1842 Drummond in his correspondence was referring to the area as Toodyay while referring to Duidgee Catta as the name of a pool on his estate.

=== The Ballardong people of Duidgee ===
Before the arrival of Europeans, the Toodyay (Duidgee) region was owned by the Ballardong Noongar people, whose country extended from the Wongan Hills and beyond in the north to beyond Pingelly in the south, though the people whose land included present-day Toodyay probably numbered about 100 people and occupied the area from around Bolgart to Burlong Pool on the Avon River near Northam, a range of about 50 kilometres (31 mi). The Avon River at Toodyay was a key site for food supply for the Ballardong, as was revealed to botanist and new landholder James Drummond as soon as he arrived in the area. The site was also located along the route taken by the river serpent, the Wagyl, in his seasonal underground travels between the spring at Bolgart and Burlong Pool. It had been a focal point of Ballardong life for thousands of years.

=== Old Toodyay, 1836–1860 ===
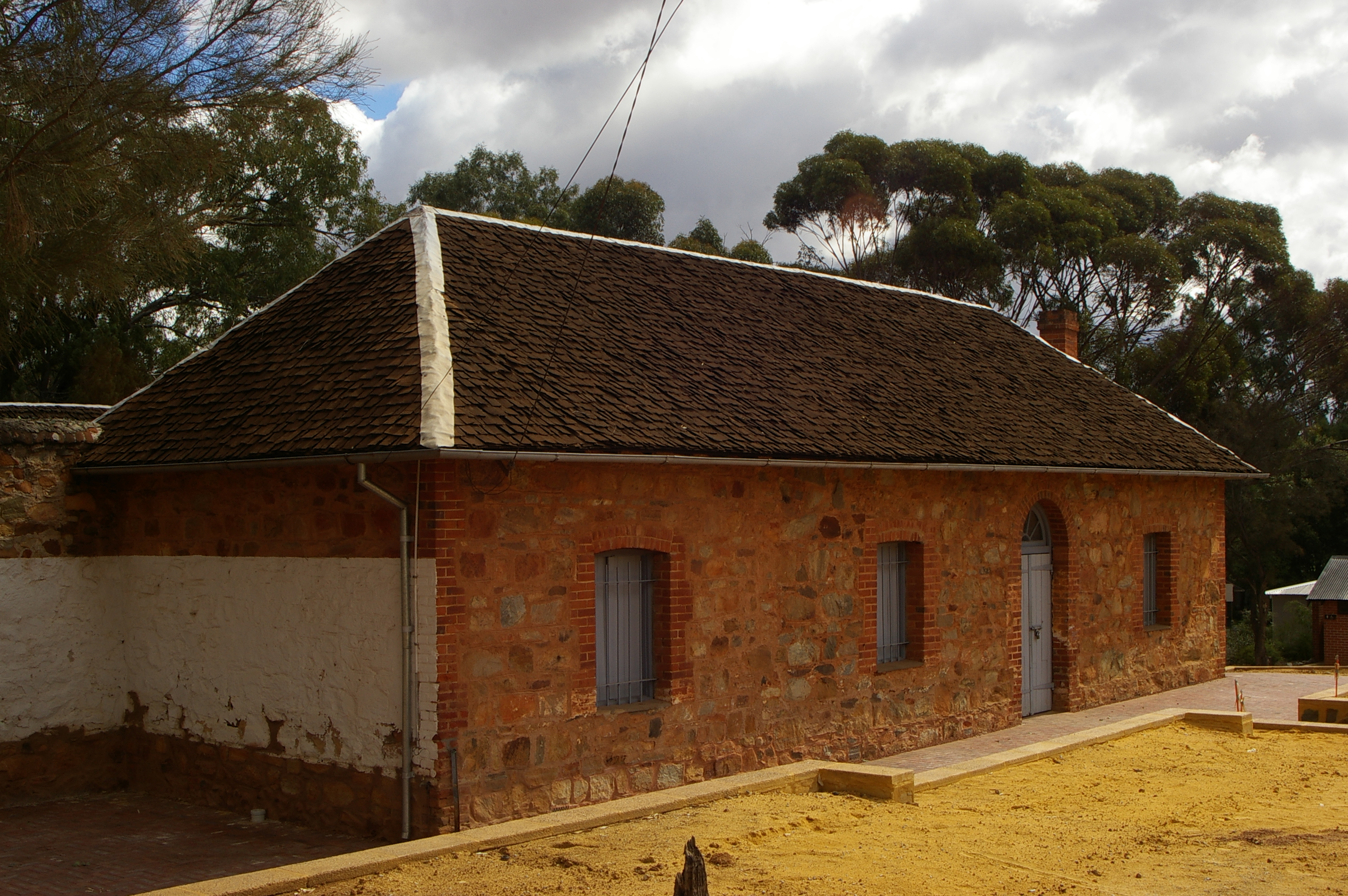
The Old Gaol

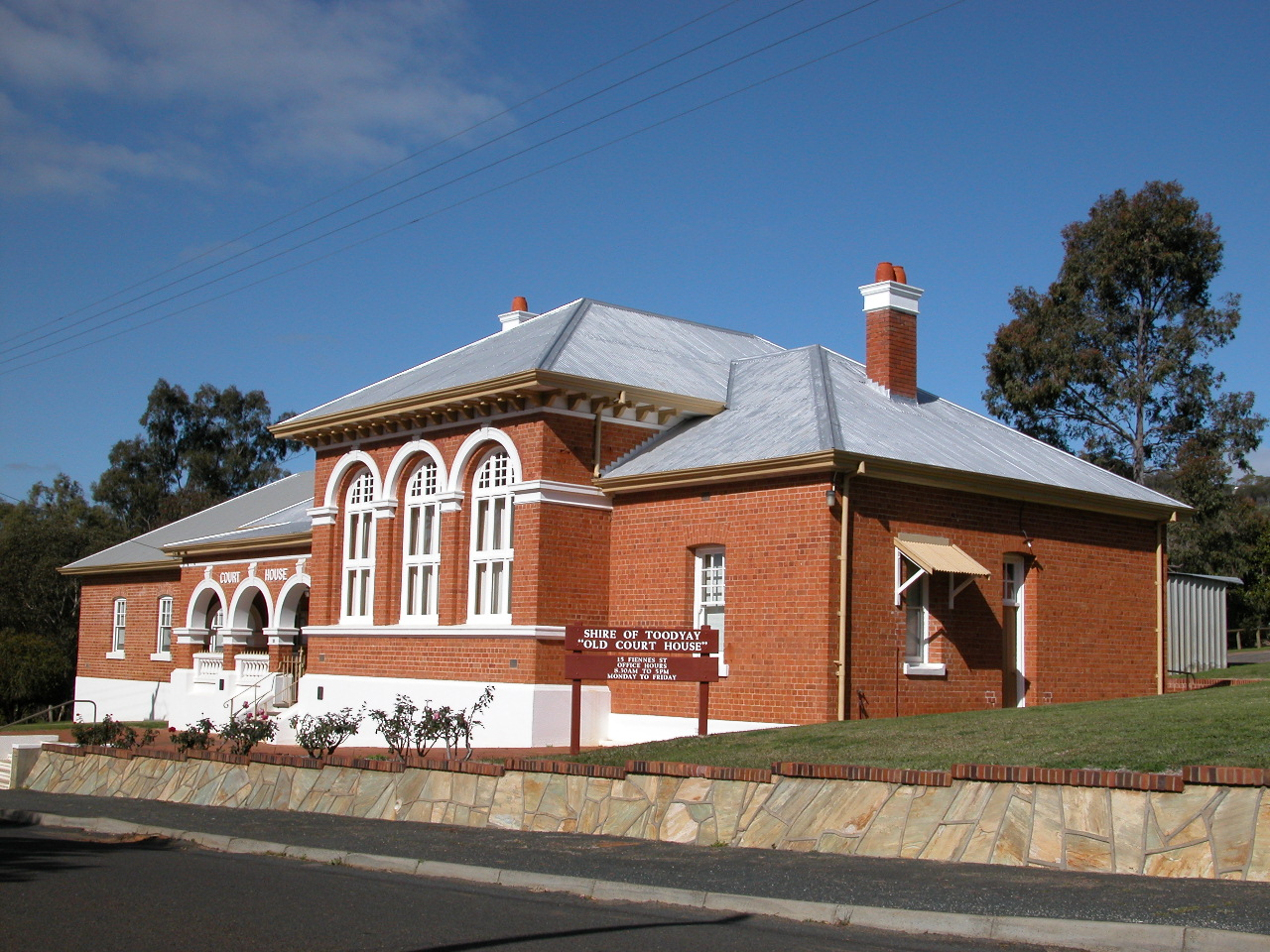
Old Court House in Fiennes Street now used as Shire of Toodyay offices (2004)

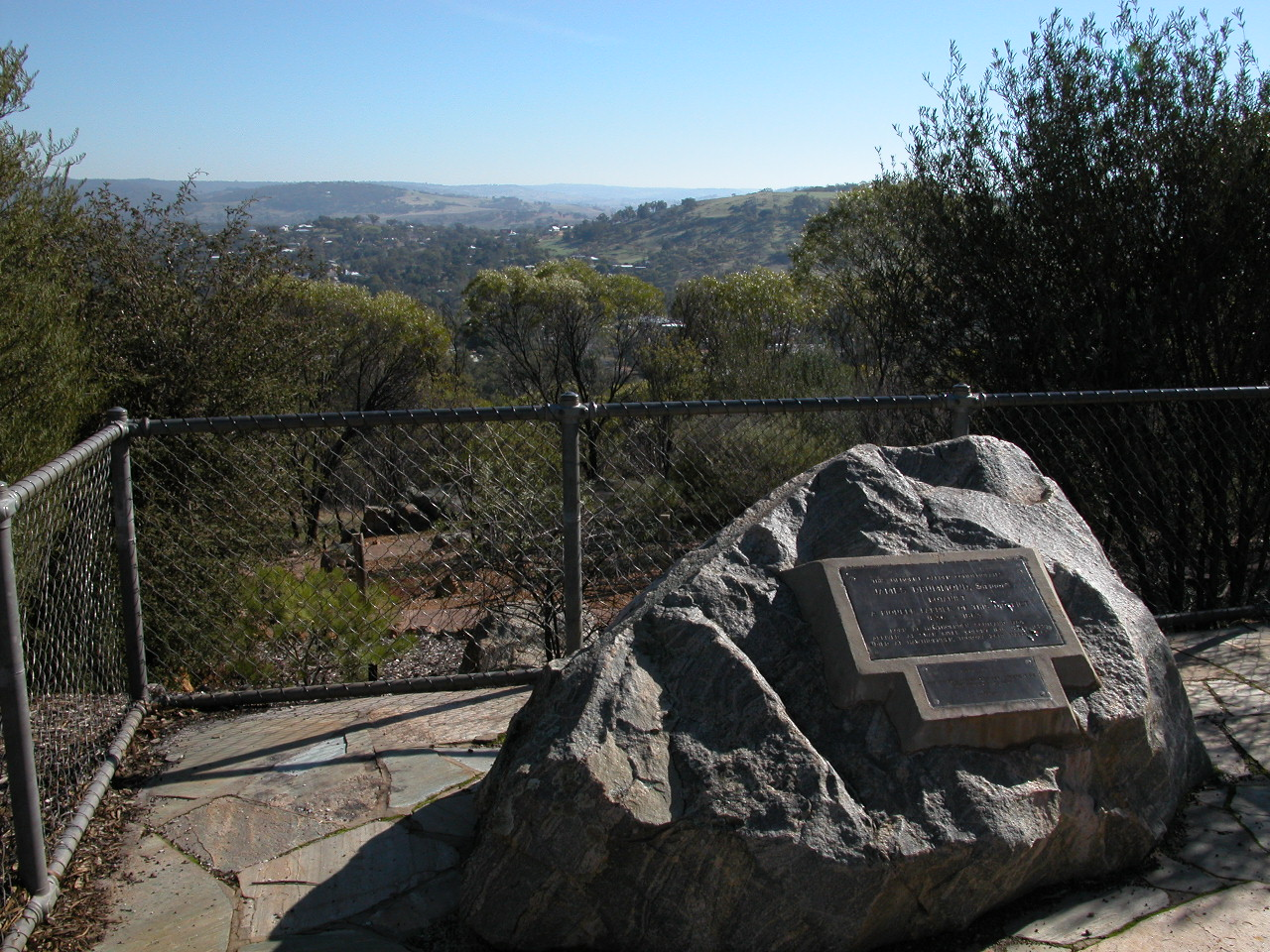
Memorial to James Drummond, botanist, in Pelham Reserve, overlooking the Toodyay townsite

The Avon River valley in which Toodyay was to be located was discovered for the white settlers by Robert Dale in 1830, leading to further exploration by settlers including James Drummond, Francis Whitfield and Alexander Anderson. The first village of Toodyay was established in 1836, one of the earliest inland settlements in Western Australia. Drummond established his homestead Hawthornden a few kilometres to the north.

The original townsite of Toodyay was determined in 1836. Following serious flooding in 1857 and 1859, the decision was made to transfer the town to the site of the Toodyay Convict Depot located approximately 5 kilometres (3 mi) upstream.

=== Newcastle, 1860–1910 ===
The original townsite was subject to flooding, which led to its abandonment in the 1850s, and a new townsite was established on higher ground 2 kilometres (1.2 mi) upstream. This was proclaimed by Governor Arthur Kennedy on 1 October 1860 as Newcastle and the original settlement came to be referred to as Old Toodyay. The name "Newcastle" was derived from the Secretary of State for the Colonies, the Duke of Newcastle. The township of "Old" Toodyay continued to exist, although it ceased to expand.

The Newcastle Gaol, in Clinton Street, completed in 1864, was in use as a state prison until 1909. It is now preserved as a heritage building and tourist attraction, the Old Gaol Museum.

In 1870, a steam-driven flour mill, Connor's Mill, was built on Stirling Terrace by George Hasell. The mill was also used to generate electricity in the early twentieth century. Saved from demolition in the 1970s, and restored to demonstrate the milling process and machinery, the mill now forms the museum section of the Toodyay Visitor Centre.

=== Toodyay since 1910 ===
In May 1910, due to confusion with the New South Wales city of Newcastle. All too often the problem of duplicated place names was causing mail to go astray. One instance of mail going astray concerned an item discovered by Sir John Forrest. A beautiful French ormolu clock had been delivered mistakenly to Newcastle, New South Wales, where it had sat unclaimed. Forrest recognised that the clock belonged to William Demasson of Newcastle, Western Australia, and arranged for it to be restored to its rightful owner. This incident is known to have contributed to the call for change. In February 1910, the Municipal Council held a referendum and, by a slim majority, it was decided to change the name of the town to Toodyay. On 6 May 1910, it was declared that the town of Newcastle would henceforth be known as Toodyay and the old town of Toodyay would henceforth be known as West Toodyay. The original townsite, which had by this time declined substantially, became West Toodyay.

The Heritage Council of Western Australia lists over one hundred places of historical significance in or near Toodyay, including cottages (some of which are now ruins), homesteads, shops, churches, parks and railway infrastructure. The State Register of Heritage Buildings includes the Gaol, Connor's Mill, Toodyay Public Library, the old Toodyay Post Office and the old Toodyay Fire Station, as well as several other historic sites. The historic architecture of shops and residences along the main street, Stirling Terrace, presents a distinctive frontage termed the Stirling Terrace Streetscape Group.

Some of the buildings are also listed on the Australian Heritage Database. They include the Freemasons Hotel, the Victoria Hotel, and Urwin's Store on Stirling Terrace, and Butterly's Cottage on Harper Road.

The current Toodyay District High School was established in 1954, replacing an older building constructed in 1886.

In 1986 the town was the location used to film the movie Shame.

=== French Ormolu clock ===
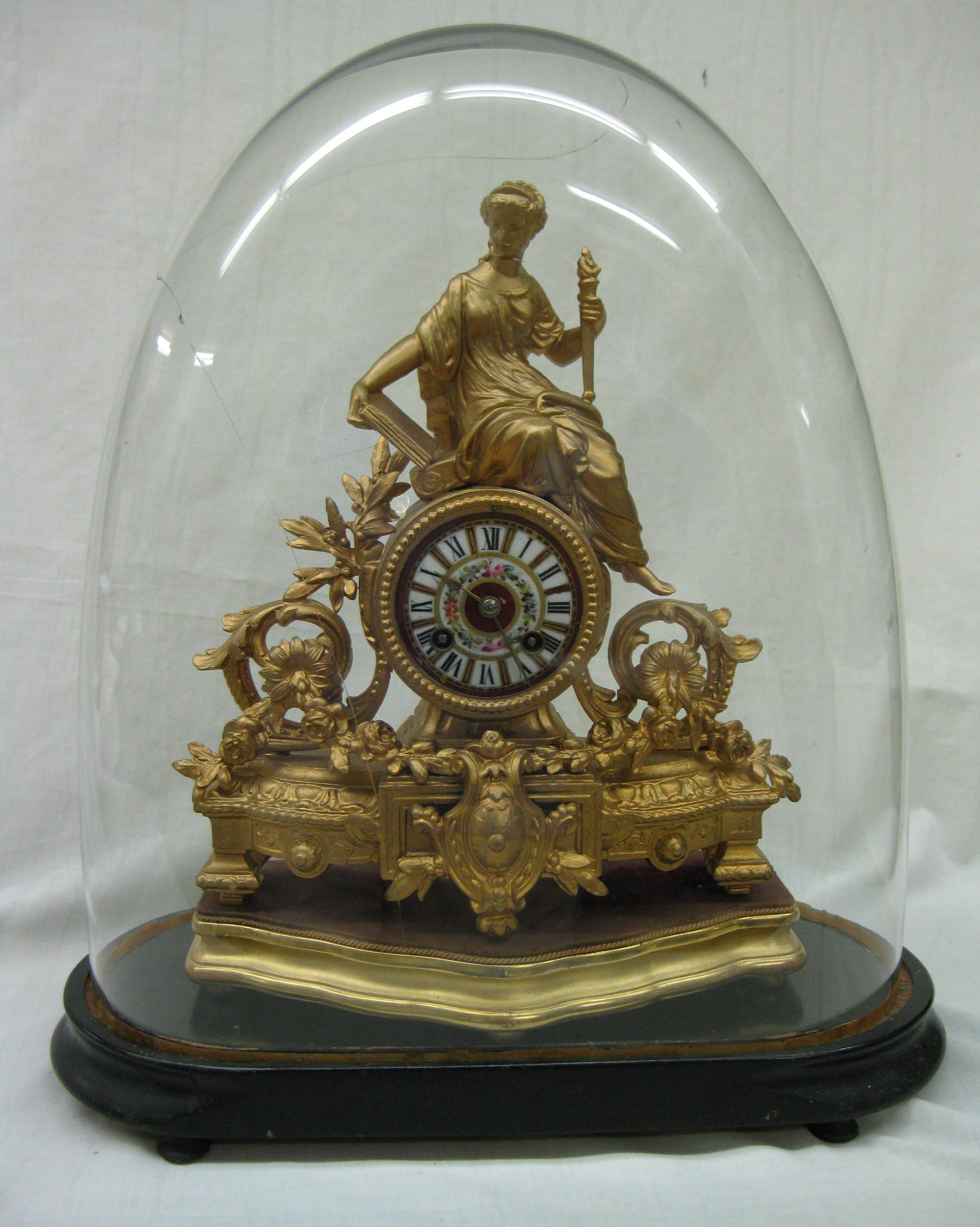
The French ormolu clock

The French Ormolu clock, long held by the Demasson family, was purchased by the National Trust of Western Australia in 1987. In turn, the clock, together with its documents was offered to the Toodyay Historical Society. On 21 October 2007, the clock was welcomed back to the town of Toodyay.

== Notable people ==
In 1861, Western Australian bushranger Moondyne Joe was imprisoned in Toodyay for horse stealing, but later escaped. Following several subsequent offenses and imprisonments, he returned to Toodyay in 1865 to steal supplies for an attempted overland escape to South Australia. His history in the town is commemorated annually during the Moondyne Festival.

== Tourism ==
By the early 1920s Toodyay was being recognised for its potential to develop into a tourist destination, with ample accommodation, its link to Western Australia's colonial past, Moondyne Joe and the Newcastle Gaol as point of interest. Being an hour's drive from Perth, present day Toodyay is a popular venue for tourists. A picturesque circuit of Toodyay Road through Gidgegannup, Toodyay, Chittering Valley and Great Northern Highway attracts motorists. Other destinations include olive oil farms, lavender farms, holiday retreats, hotels, restaurants, caravan parks, an emu farm and a public archery park.

== Transport ==
=== Railways ===
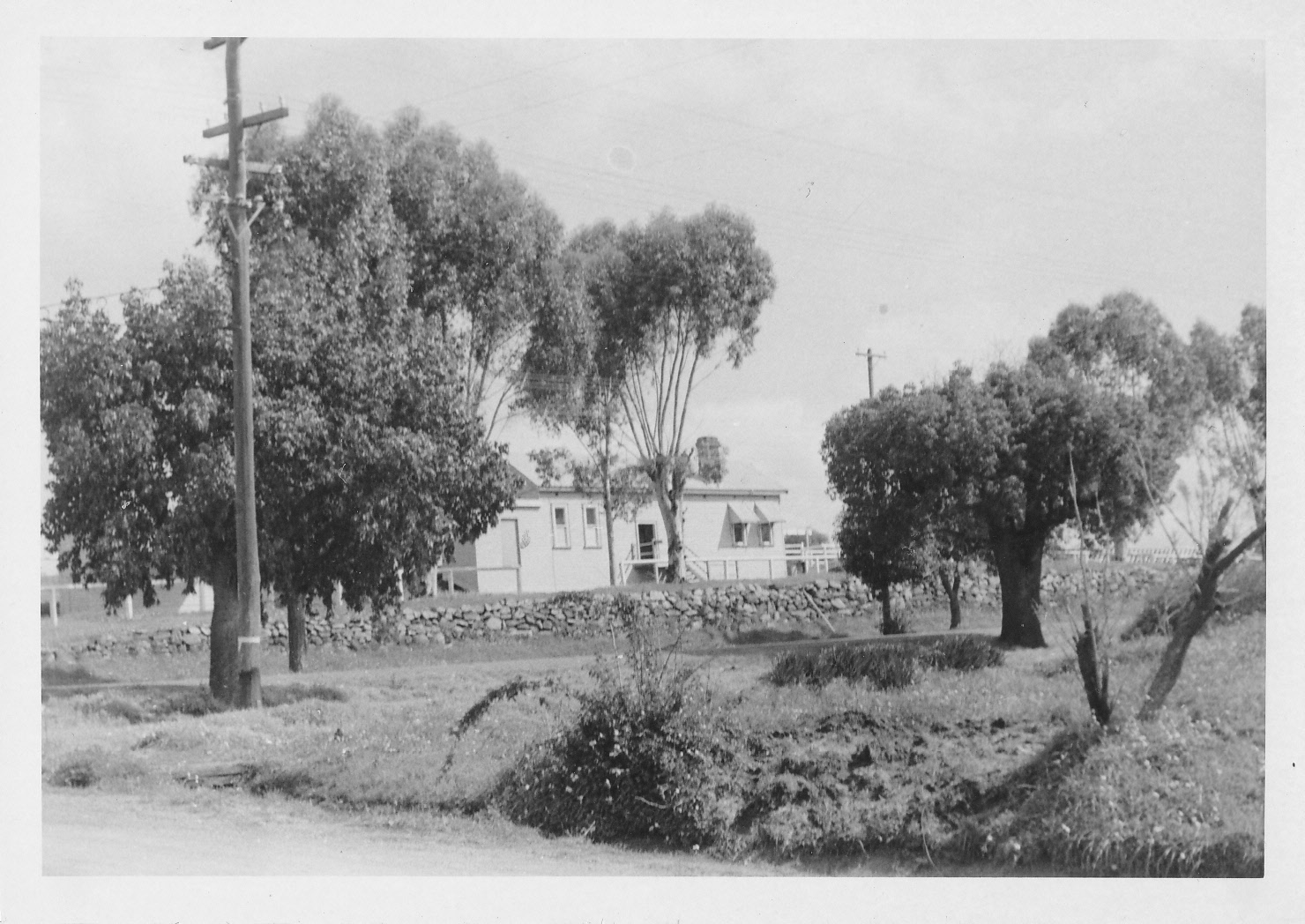
Old Toodyay railway station c. 1955, as seen from Stirling Terrace

Historically, Newcastle was connected to the Western Australian Government Railways network by a line that left the Eastern Railway at Clackline, which then travelled through Western Toodyay to proceed to Bolgart and then on to Miling. This connection was changed when the Eastern Railway was re-routed through the Avon Valley in 1966. The Clackline connection was closed, and Toodyay became part of the main eastern railway route.

Toodyay railway station is currently served by Transwa AvonLink, MerredinLink and Prospector passenger trains on the route from Perth to Northam and Kalgoorlie.

=== Roads ===
Toodyay is connected to Perth by Toodyay Road, which runs in a south-westerly direction to Great Northern Highway in Middle Swan, Perth. Within Toodyay, it continues as the town's main street, Stirling Terrace. Other major roads radiating out from Toodyay are:

- Clackline Toodyay Road, heading south to Clackline on Great Eastern Highway
- Northam Toodyay Road, heading south-east to Northam and Great Eastern Highway
- Goomalling Toodyay Road, heading north-east to Goomalling
- Bindi Bindi Toodyay Road, heading north to Calingiri, and later Bindi Bindi on Great Northern Highway
- Bindoon Dewars Pool Road, heading north-west to Bindoon
- Julimar Road, heading west to Chittering

Toodyay is also the northern end of the Avon Historic Tourist Drive (Tourist Drive 254), which follows the Avon River to Beverley.

=== Motor racing ===
On 5 May 1947, a motor racing meeting took place, using the town's streets for the course. The circuit was in a clockwise direction, following the route Stirling Terrace (where the start and finish was located), Henry Street, Duke Street, Fiennes Street, Templar Lane and back to Stirling Terrace. The main race of the meeting was the 48-kilometre (30 mi) Toodyay Speed Classic, which was won by Syd Barker. A second meeting was planned for 17 November 1948, to coincide with the King's Birthday holiday, but the holiday was cancelled, as was the race meeting.

Toodyay plays host to a leg of the Tarmac West each year, normally on the Saturday of the event.

=== Waterways ===
Toodyay is located on the Avon River, which runs through to the Swan River in Perth. The annual Avon Descent sees a range of crafts make their way downriver through Toodyay, from the starting point at Northam.

== Bushfires ==
Toodyay has been impacted by fires – a common occurrence in the summer months – since it was settled. Significant bushfires have regularly been reported in the area from as early as 1853. Two of the most devastating fires to threaten Toodyay have resulted from state government infrastructure, along with other smaller fires, including the spontaneous combustion of a dung heap at the Newcastle Police Stables.

On 10 December 1909 a fire was started by a train using the newly opened Newcastle–Bolgart Railway near Coondle; the fire was referred to as the most disastrous that had ever occurred in the area. It burnt an area of about 24 kilometres (15 mi) in length and up to 6.4 kilometres (4 mi) wide. Three hundred and fifty people fought the fire over two days before putting it out. A later flare up caused further damage to 240 hectares (600 acres) of land, 200 hectares (500 acres) of which was on the property of Timothy Quinlan. In 1906, when he was Speaker of the Western Australian Legislative Assembly, Quinlan had been an advocate for the building of the line.

A major bushfire, blamed on collapsed power lines, broke out at about noon on 29 December 2009 after outdoor temperature had reached 45.4 °C (113.7 °F) and the fire risk rating of catastrophic had been used for the first time in the state. Areas to the south, south-west and east of Toodyay were affected, with more than 3,000 hectares (7,410 acres) of forest burnt and 38 homes lost.

== Sources ==
- Bidstrup, Eliza (3 May 2025). "Convict-turned-bushranger Moondyne Joe an unlikely hero celebrated in Toodyay". ABC News.
