= Toodyay Pioneer Heritage Trail =

Western Australian heritage trail

The Toodyay Pioneer Heritage Trail was a trail created by the Toodyay Bicentennial Community Committee in 1988 for the Australian Bicentenary as part of the Western Australian Heritage Trails Network.

The brochure created for the trail has the subtitle Early Settlement of Toodyay in the Avon Valley, Western Australia, and it covers 20 km that includes the West Toodyay townsite.

The identified sites were:

- 1. Morangup Hill
- 2. Morangup Spring
- 3. Jimperding Hill Descent
- 4. Jimperding Pool and Nolan's Rock
- not numbered but identified "Deepdale homestead"

West Toodyay historic sites:

- 5. West Toodyay School
- 6. Samuel Ferguson's cottage
- 7. Royal Oak Inn
- 8. Highland Laddie
- 9. Queen's Head Hotel
- 10. Military Barracks
- 11. Colonial School
- 12. Lock Up
- 13. Catholic Chapel
- 14. Newcastle Recreation Ground and Cottage

The 1988 trail ended at the Duidgee Park Picnic Area – from that point, there were two other trails – the River Gum Trail, and the Newcastle Walking Trail that continued into the Toodyay township.
