= Newcastle Gaol Museum =

Museum located in Toodyay, Western Australia

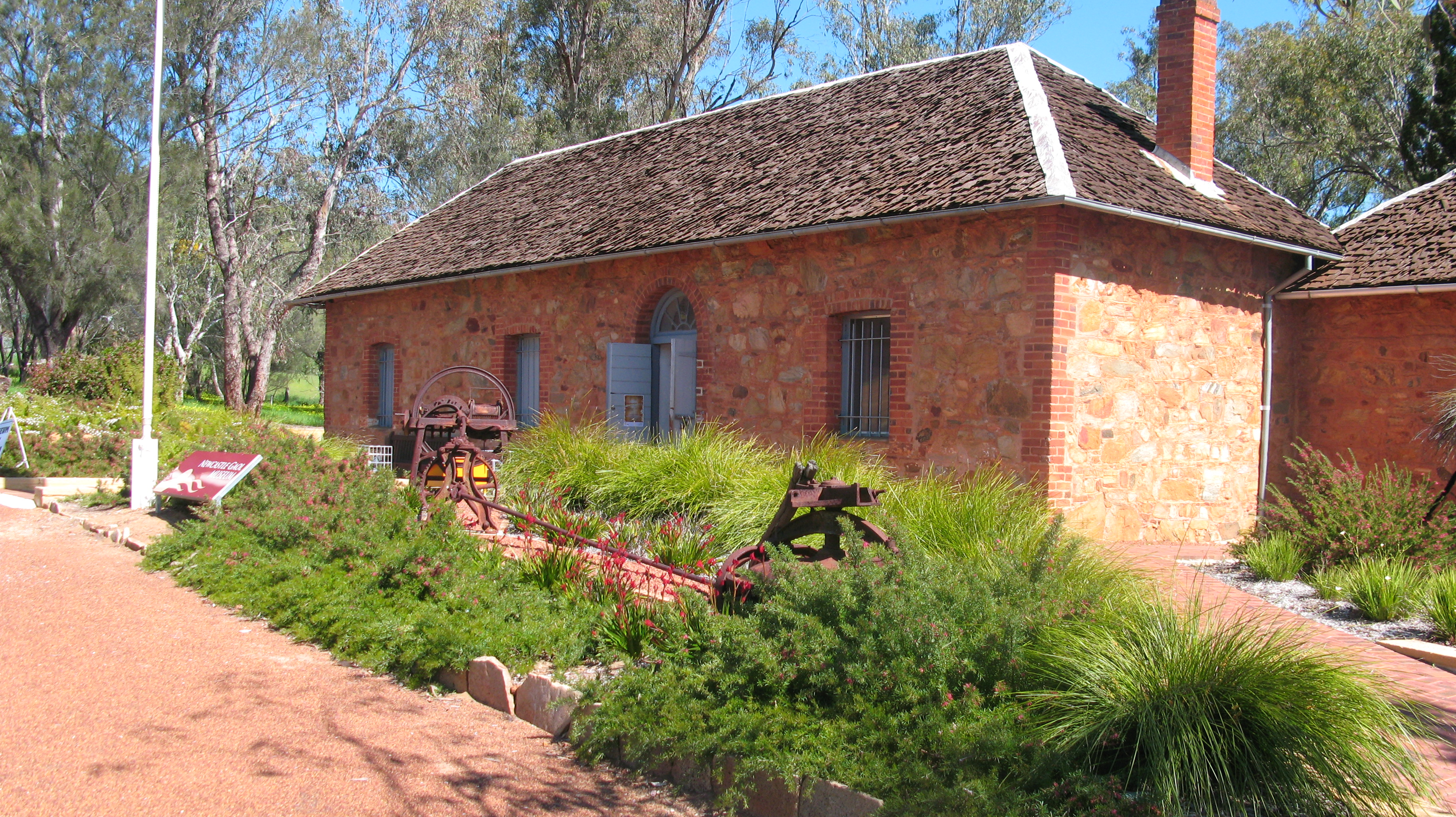
- Old Newcastle Gaol Museum

General information
- Type: Prison museum
- Location: Toodyay, Western Australia
- Coordinates: 31.5535°S 116.46710°E

Western Australia Heritage Register
- Official name: Newcastle Gaol, Lock-up and Stables Group, Toodyay
- Type: State Registered Place
- Designated: 31 May 1996
- Reference no.: 2558

The Newcastle Gaol Museum is a prison museum on Clinton Street in Toodyay, Western Australia, founded in 1962. The museum records the history of the serial escapee Moondyne Joe and his imprisonment in the "native cell".

== History ==
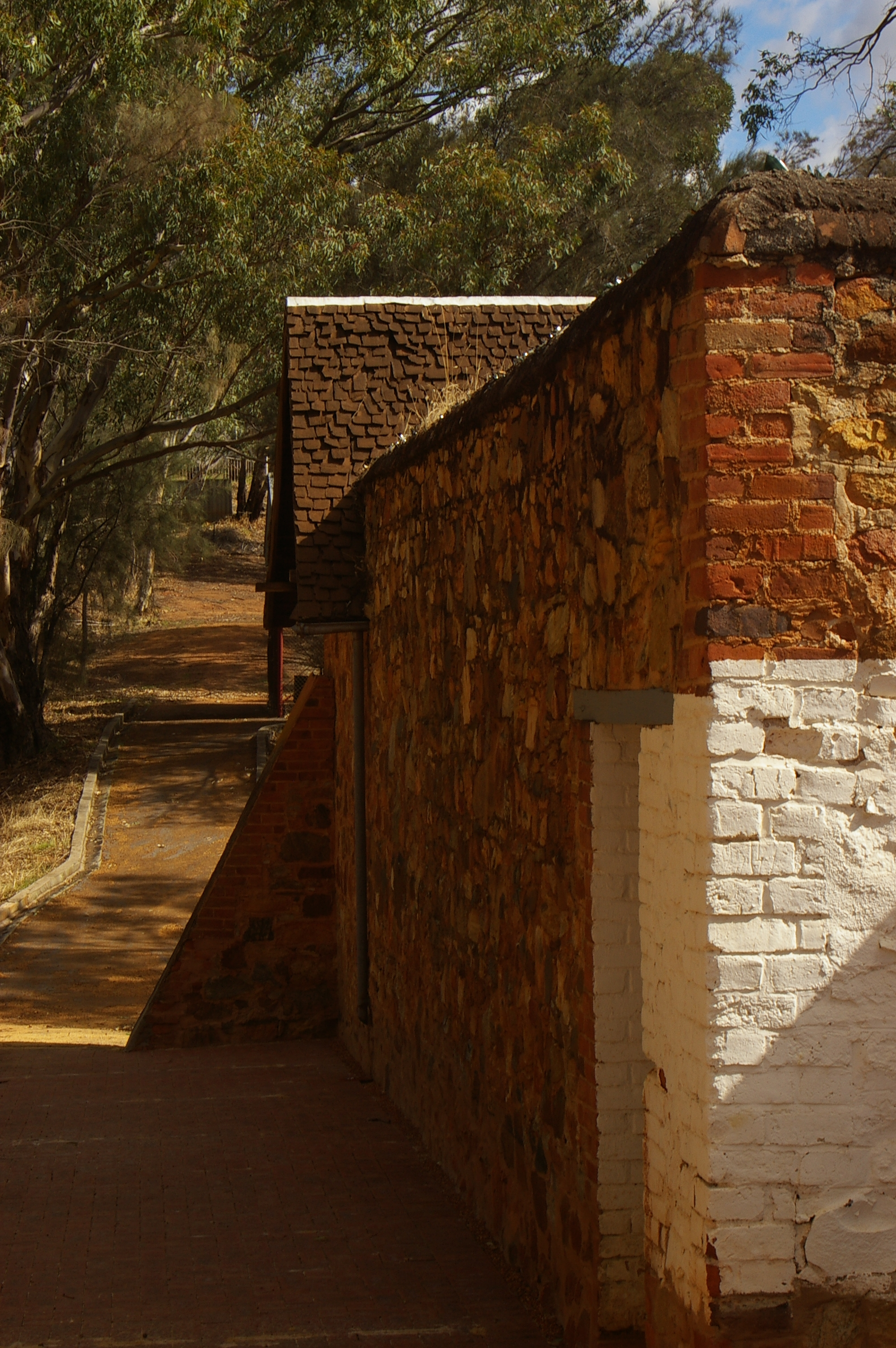
Side of the complex with broken glass embedded into the top of the wall to discourage escape attempts

In the early days of settlement (1832) the military and the resident magistrate were stationed at York. Crimes at this time were mostly stealing of livestock.

In June 1840, Governor John Hutt created a special police force, known as the Native Police, to deal with native offenders, as distinct from the civil police, which dealt with "white" settlers. The new force was led by John Drummond, who had become friendly with the Noongar people and, with his Aboriginal troopers, made regular patrols around the district.

Samuel Pole Phillips was appointed as the local justice of the peace, to support the work of the resident magistrate. After the murder of Chidlow and Jones by a group of 40 Aboriginals, Governor Hutt, in 1837, ordered a substantial barracks and stables to be built on the Toodyay townsite on lot R1. This was the first Government building for the town and was built by William Criddle in 1842.

By 1854, Toodyay had a Mounted Police Force under Constable Gee, a Native Police Force under Constable James Betts, as well as the Pensioner Guards. A new lockup to serve as a gaol was built on the Toodyay townsite on lot R66 in Charles Street. It consisted of 12 cells, warder's quarters and an exercise yard with a high wall. The main offences among white settlers related to drunkenness, whether the offenders were "free" or "bonded".

In April 1851, the convict ship Pyrenees arrived, which forced Governor Charles Fitzgerald to establish depots in country areas. For the Toodyay valley, Michael Clarkson became the Superintendent of the Toodyay Convict Hiring Depot. At first the convicts were housed at the Toodyay Barracks in the Toodyay townsite. The accompanying Pensioner Guards, ex military, who had been offered land as an incentive to come to the colony, acted as a special police force for emergencies. Those who came to the depot in Toodyay Valley were offered small land grants at the Toodyay townsite. These were worked out on a plan of the town but were later cancelled when the Pensioner Guards were moved to the new depot site, which was two miles further upstream. This is the present site of today's Toodyay, which was formerly called Newcastle.

Due to the economic recession the convict hiring depot was no longer needed. In 1860–61 it was decided to abandon the Toodyay townsite due to more floods in those years and the preceding ones, and to move to the centre of the depot site. The Mounted Police moved into the Commissariat Stables. The police sergeant, two constables and the lockup keeper were given cottages. One of the rooms was used for a courtroom.

The magistrate suggested a site for the new gaol between the Toodyay townsite and the depot. He made this suggestion on the grounds that drunks could be more easily transported from the local inns to the cells, as the Queens Head was the main inn at the time.

James Everett's inn was to suffer the same fate as the buildings in the Toodyay townsite, for a severe flood in 1862 put watermarks on the walls higher than ever before and cracked the walls. Durlacher insisted that the new gaol should have a courtroom. A small lockup at the depot was strengthened with fittings removed from the Toodyay townsite gaol/lockup. A record of this transaction exists, dated 1862.

Meanwhile, plans were being drawn up by Richard Roach Jewell for a new gaol.

Eventually the site chosen for the 1862 plan was lot 29 in Clinton Street, in the new town of Newcastle.

The plan for the Newcastle Gaol was Public Works Plan, PWD No 179. Timber from an old lockup from Bailup was used. Convict labour was used, although the work was supervised by a stonemason (ex convict) who was living in the area. He complained of having unskilled workers working with him and reported that the job was taking longer to do because of this.

Jewell's plan showed a timber lined security cell, which also has an iron bar for leg irons.

The existing gaol is much smaller than was originally planned. Durlacher did not get his courtroom. The proportions were planned on a square, with more living accommodation than exists at present. The gaol was eventually finished in 1864 and operational by 1865. The gaol continued as a state gaol until 1909.

In the 1930s, the building was used as a residence by the Dorizzi family. The sons slept in the cells. The boys joined the Australian army and in 1945, three of the brothers died at the hands of their enemy captors. One cell is now dedicated to them and to all local servicemen and women who did not return home.

After World War II for nearly 20 years the building slowly deteriorated until a restoration programme was undertaken in 1962, and the museum began.

== Current use ==
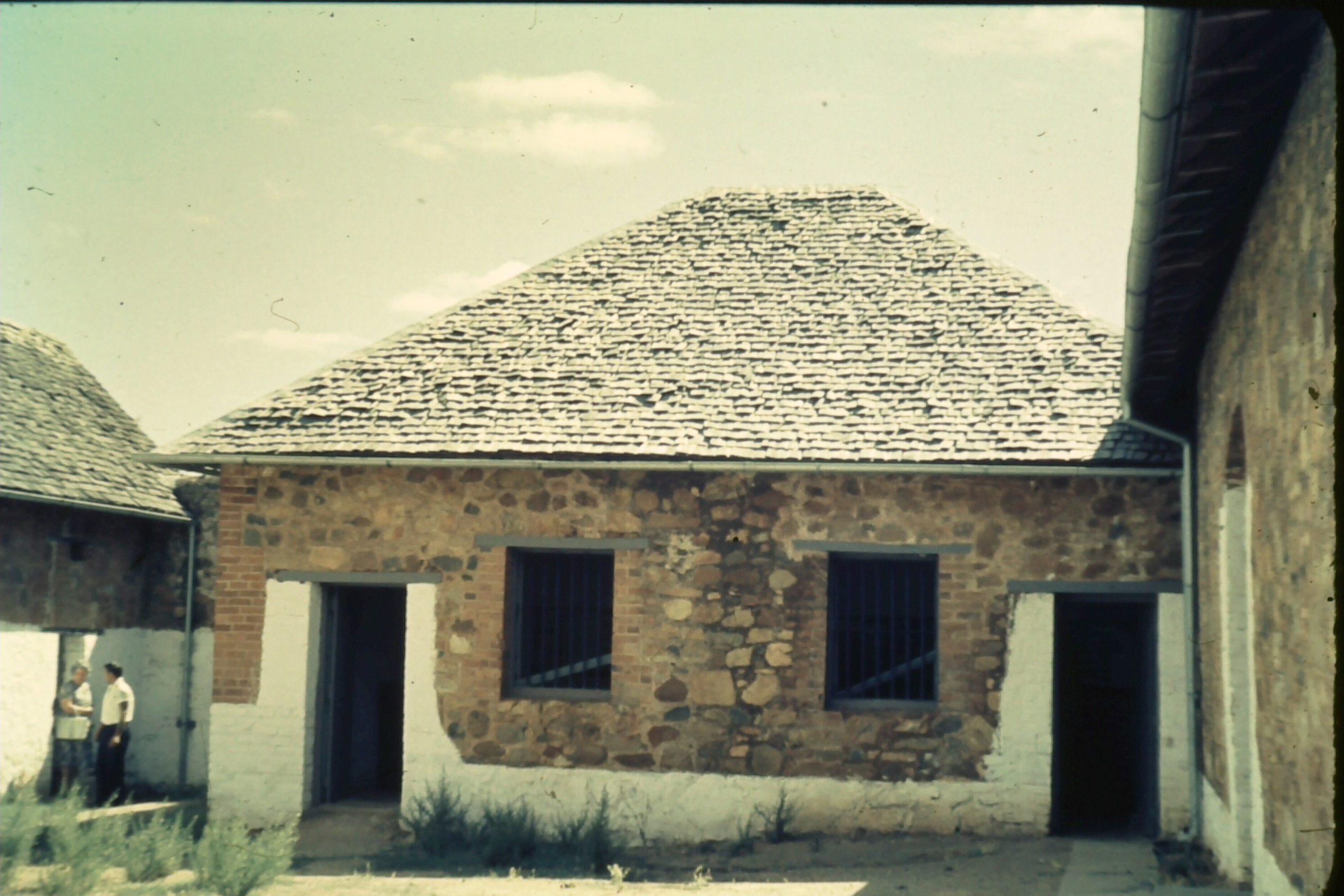
Old Newcastle Gaol, inside before restoration commenced in 1962

In 1962, the gaol was restored as a museum by the Shire of Toodyay and the W.A. Tourist Bureau. Grants from the National Heritage Commission, matched by grants from the Shire of Toodyay have enabled the fabric of the building to be stabilized. The building is classified under the National Trust. The museum is now a recognised museum under the Museum Act, vested in the Shire of Toodyay. The Shire employs a professional museum curator who manages the gaol with the assistance of volunteers. The displays have constantly improved over the years and now include the Moondyne Joe Gallery and the "Native" Cell. The latter display contributed to a Heritage Council Award for Interpretation in 2013.

The main exhibition space features temporary displays, including from time to time a courtroom scene. Other areas feature artefacts relating to daily life in the settler era. At the rear is a display of early agricultural machinery while across the road is the restored 1891 Police Stable, the 1907 Police Lock-Up and a one-hundred-year-old shearing shed relocated from further afield. A number of horse-drawn appliances and carts can be viewed at this site.

In 1983 the museum received an award from the Museums Australia for Best Educational Programme.

== Police stables ==
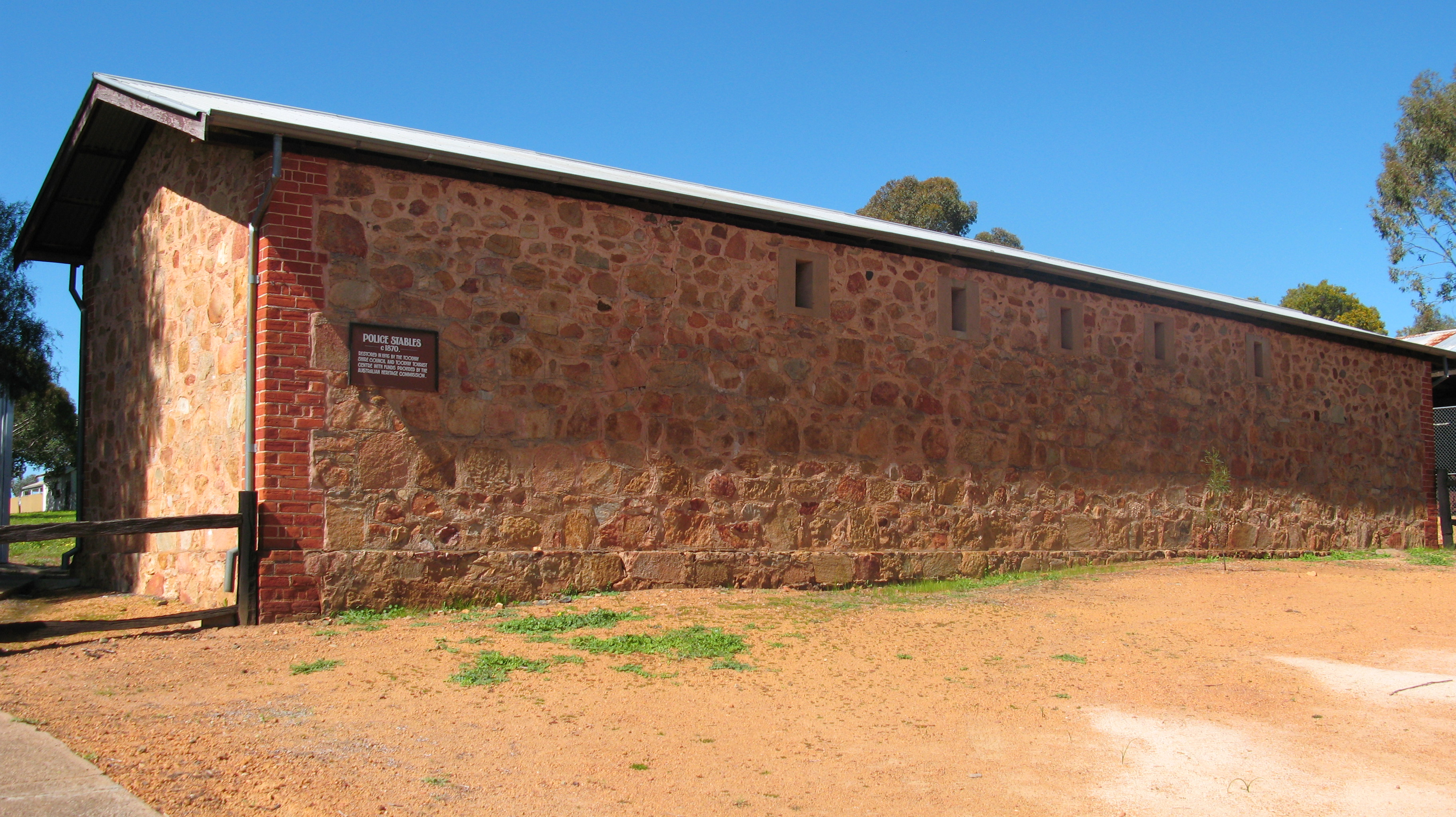
Toodyay Police Stables

The stables opposite the gaol site were constructed in 1891 and remained in use until 1955. The present structure replaced a timber building erected on this site in 1860, which were destroyed by fire. The present building is a single storey stone range with brick quoining and stone window dressings. It has a shallow pitched corrugated iron roof with gables. The façade facing the street is solid stonework with five small high level openings. Restoration of the building began in the 1970s and the stables are currently open as part of the Old Gaol Museum complex.
