= West Toodyay =

Locality in Western Australia

Coordinates: 31°32′S 116°25′E

West Toodyay (previously known as Toodyay; colloquially known as Old Toodyay) was the original location of the town of Toodyay, Western Australia. It is situated in the Toodyay valley, 85 kilometres (53 mi) north east of Perth. The Toodyay valley, discovered by Ensign Robert Dale in 1831, was opened up for settlement in 1836. The original site for the town of Toodyay was determined in 1836 and its boundaries were finalised 1838. The first survey of the town was carried out in 1849. After several serious floods, the decision was made to move the town of Toodyay to higher ground. In 1860, the new town of Newcastle was established 3 miles (4.8 km) further upstream. Newcastle was renamed in 1910 to Toodyay, and the original site became known as West Toodyay.

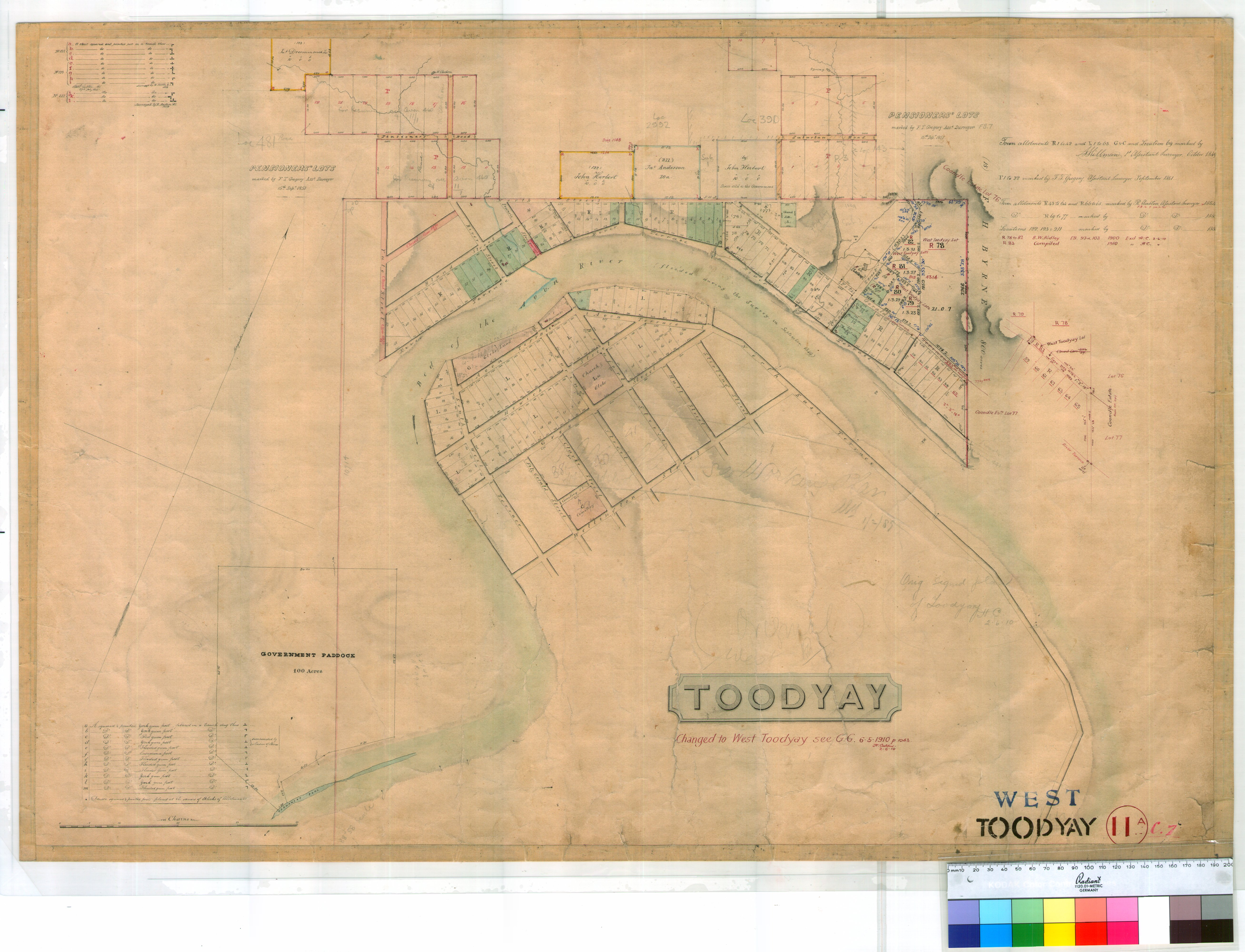
Map of West Toodyay, 1910, Cons 3868 item 395

== Old Toodyay ==
The town of Toodyay was established on the banks of the Avon River where the valley gave way to gentle slopes of fertile soils with hills on all sides. The original site for the town of Toodyay was determined by Governor James Stirling in 1836. The survey of its boundaries was finalised in December 1838 after the necessary adjustments had been made to the boundaries of two neighbouring land grants.

Apart from the erection of the Military Barracks on the left bank of the Avon River, little development of the town could take place until after the first official survey had been carried out. Assistant Surveyor Arthur Hillman carried out this survey in September 1849 at a time when the Avon River was in flood. Most of the subsequent development took place along the right bank of the Avon River. River Terrace was aligned to the curve of the river's course and was crossed by six streets. Town lots along River Terrace were numbered R1 to R42, "R" indicating the right bank of the river. Along the ridge behind, North St and Fitzgerald Terrace paralleled the curve of River Terrace.

Town development quickened after the arrival of the convict era and the setting up of the Toodyay Convict Hiring Depot at the townsite in 1851. A total of three inns were established: The Royal Oak, The Highland Laddie and The Queen's Head. A number of homes, stores, schools and a church were built.

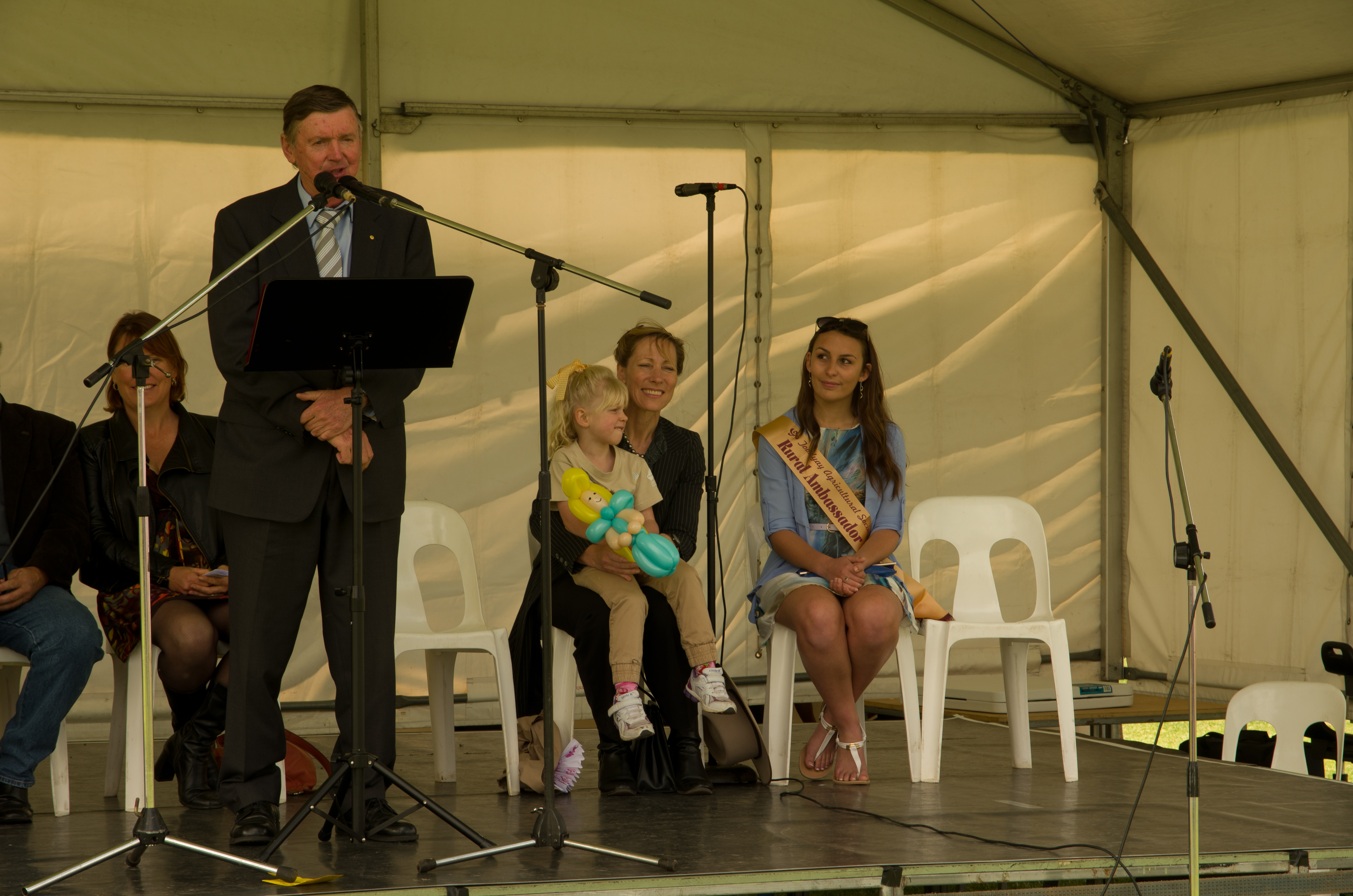
Governor Malcolm McCusker continuing the tradition of attendance, and opening the 160th Toodyay Show in 2013

A second Royal Oak, (Note: The first Royal Oak closed in 1851.) owned by John Herbert, became the centre of social activity for the town. In November 1853, the Toodyay, Northam, and Victoria Plains Agricultural Society was formed at a meeting held at the Royal Oak. Thereafter the Society's annual events, which included an Annual Show, were held at the Royal Oak in either October or November of each year. Some forty years later, and after several name changes, the Society became known as the Toodyay Agricultural Society. For many years it has been customary for the Governor of Western Australia and other dignitaries to attend the Toodyay Agricultural Show, which is held each year in October.

In 1852, the Toodyay Convict Hiring Depot was moved to a new and larger site approximately 3 miles (4.8 km) upstream from the original townsite of Toodyay. Following severe flooding in 1857 and 1859, a new town was established in 1860 on that land which was excess to the requirements of the convict hiring depot; it was named Newcastle, after the Duke of Newcastle. The town of Newcastle was gazetted on 1 October 1860.

== West Toodyay ==
Over the following years, Newcastle's name became confused with that of Newcastle in New South Wales. On 6 May 1910, the Western Australian town of Newcastle was renamed to Toodyay and the original town of Toodyay became known as West Toodyay.

In 1920 the West Toodyay School was closed and its 24 students were transferred to the Toodyay school as part of the "consolidated schools" plan, an experiment based on practices in the US and Canada where larger schools were considered more advantageous to children's education. In 1928 the West Toodyay school building was sold by tender and removed.

== Railway ==
The location "West Toodyay" on the Western Australian Government Railways narrow gauge railway system was the point where the Clackline-Miling railway headed north, and crossed the Avon River.

With the development of the standard gauge railway line through the Avon Valley in 1966, West Toodyay was a junction where the narrow gauge Miling railway connected with the newer standard gauge system, and a marshalling yard existed.

In the deregulated railway system, West Toodyay yard is now a shire depot, a crossing loop location, and a junction where the Miling railway proceeds north over the Avon River.

During the era of the Spirit of the West railway service, the location was also known as the Avon Siding, due to the lack of any crossing or shunting facility at the Toodyay railway station site.

== Historic significance ==
The precinct is listed on the Shire of Toodyay's Municipal Inventory as having a "considerable" level of significance, with historic aesthetic and social value. The area includes:

Significant locations in West Toodyay.

- Church of Sancta Maria
- Everett's Cottage
- Ford crossing
- James Forbes' store
- Reserve and well
- Samuel Ferguson's cottage
- The Highland Laddie
- The Queen's Head
- The Royal Oak (1849–1851)
- The Royal Oak (1853–1860)
- Toodyay Barracks
- Toodyay Convict Hiring Depot (1851)
- Toodyay Gaol
- Toodyay Valley School
- West Toodyay Bridge
- West Toodyay School

== See also ==
- Toodyay Pioneer Heritage Trail
