= Old Newcastle School =

Church building in Western Australia

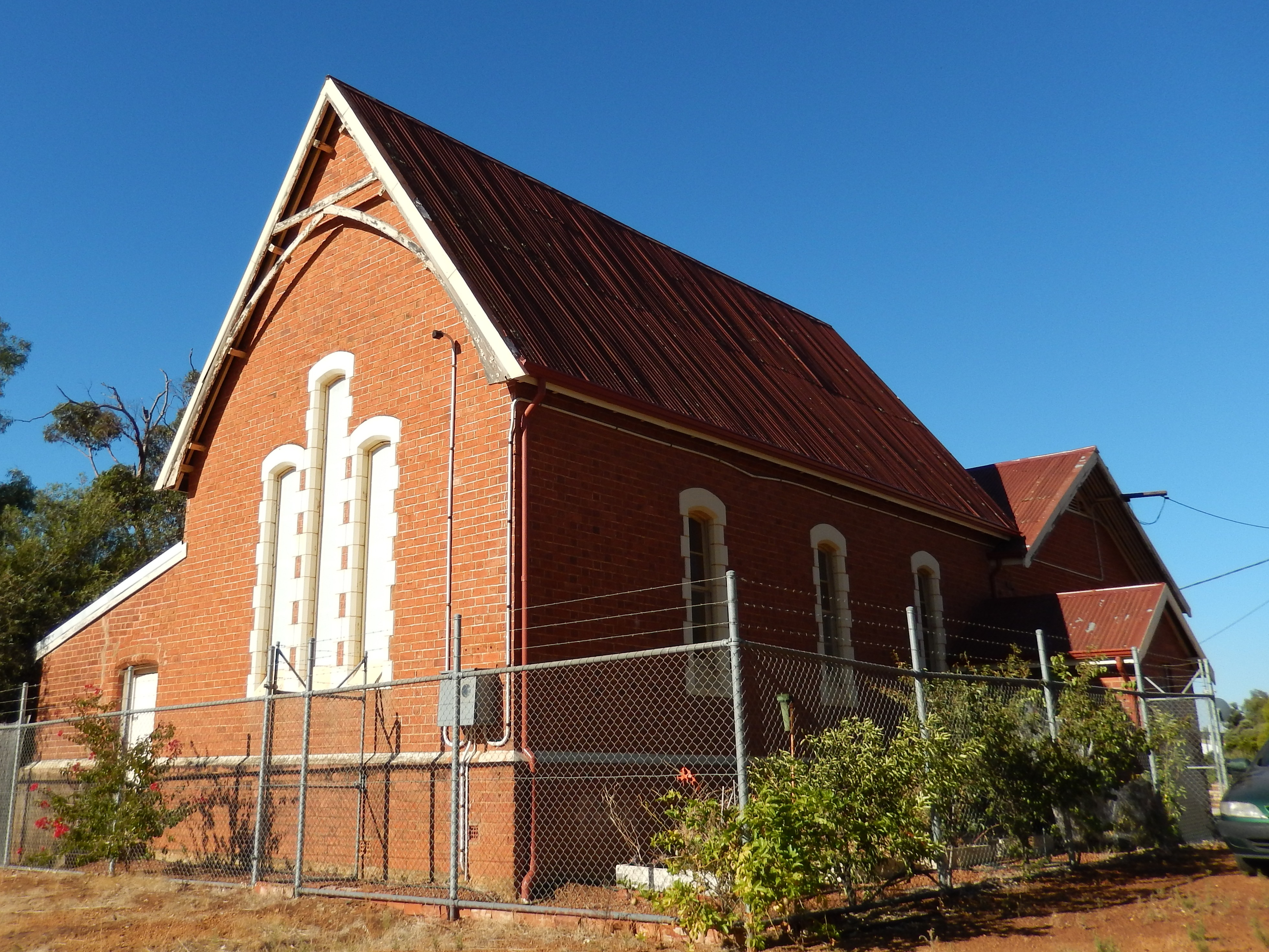
- Old Newcastle School
- Interactive map of the Old Newcastle School area
- Former names: Duke Street School, Toodyay Repertory Club, Methodist Church, Uniting Church of Toodyay

General information
- Architectural style: Victorian Academic Gothic and Federation
- Location: 6 Duke Street North, Toodyay
- Coordinates: 31.55098°S 116.46780°E
- Completed: 1887
- Renovated: 1900

Design and construction
- Architect: George Temple-Poole
- Main contractor: William Amed Demasson (1887), E.J. Cook (1900)

The old Newcastle School (Note: References list the building under a variety of names – this usage is in line with more colloquial usage.) is an historic building on Duke Street North in Toodyay, Western Australia. It was the first purpose built school in the new town site of Toodyay (then known as Newcastle), and operated as a school from 1887 to 1954.

== Description ==
The building was constructed in two stages. The original 1886 section is in Victorian Gothic style in red brick with a high pitched gable roof (originally shingle but now corrugated iron) and was designed by architect George Temple-Poole. A classroom extension in Federation style red brick with a low pitched corrugated iron roof and tall chimney was added in 1900.

== History ==
=== School, 1887–1954 ===
In 1862, the school at the original Toodyay town site was flooded and the Education Department recommended that a new school be built in the newly gazetted Newcastle town site. From 1873 to 1887 a former policemen's depot cottage, at the back of the former court house on Fiennes Street, was used as a school room.

By June 1885, money had been allocated and the land purchased, construction had begun by March 1886, and the school opened in May 1887. Although the school was described by the Public Works Department plan as a "Boys School", by 1890 both boys and girls were attending.

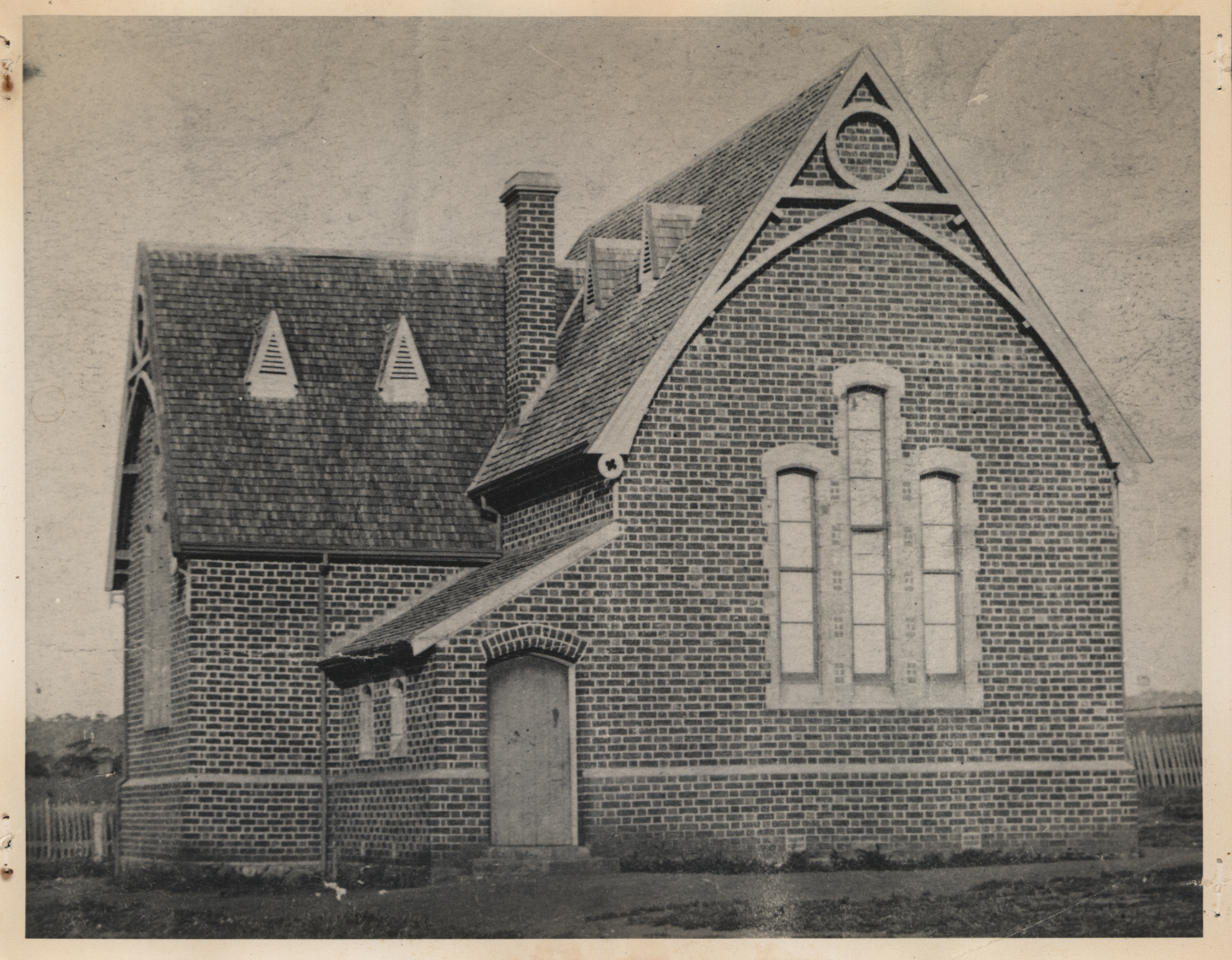
Old Newcastle School, Toodyay prior to 1896 with shingles visible on roof

The original building comprised two classrooms, 36 by 18 feet (11.0 by 5.5 m) and 18 by 12 feet (5.5 by 3.7 m), and a cloakroom. The building was not fenced until at least 1891. The shingled roof was covered by galvanised iron in 1896; the original shingles are still in place.

By 1899 the school was overcrowded, with 102 students in a rooms intended for 50. Further land was acquired and by April 1900 the building had been extended. A larger 67 by 23 feet (20.4 by 7.0 m) room was built onto the front of the building, with "revolving shutters" to allow it to be divided into two separate classrooms. Teacher's quarters, new entrances, lavatories and a new verandah were also added.

The school was connected to the Goldfields Water Supply Scheme by 1908.

Manual arts (such as carpentry) were taught at the school from 1898, and the Newcastle Manual Training Centre was established in 1904. From about 1914, new teaching methods were introduced that focused on skills suited to future farmers and country residents, including the use of small agricultural plots. (By 1923 the school garden was providing vegetables for daily hot meals in winter, prepared by the senior girls.) From 1918 the school was classified as a rural observation school, meaning that:

... teachers from surrounding small schools shall be brought in to study the work of the specially skilled teachers, whilst candidates for admission to the service as teachers of small schools will also be required to spend some time at the Observation School.

In May 1919, 27 visiting teachers participated in a "school of instruction", spending two weeks learning about the new teaching methods. This was the largest such event held in the state at the time.

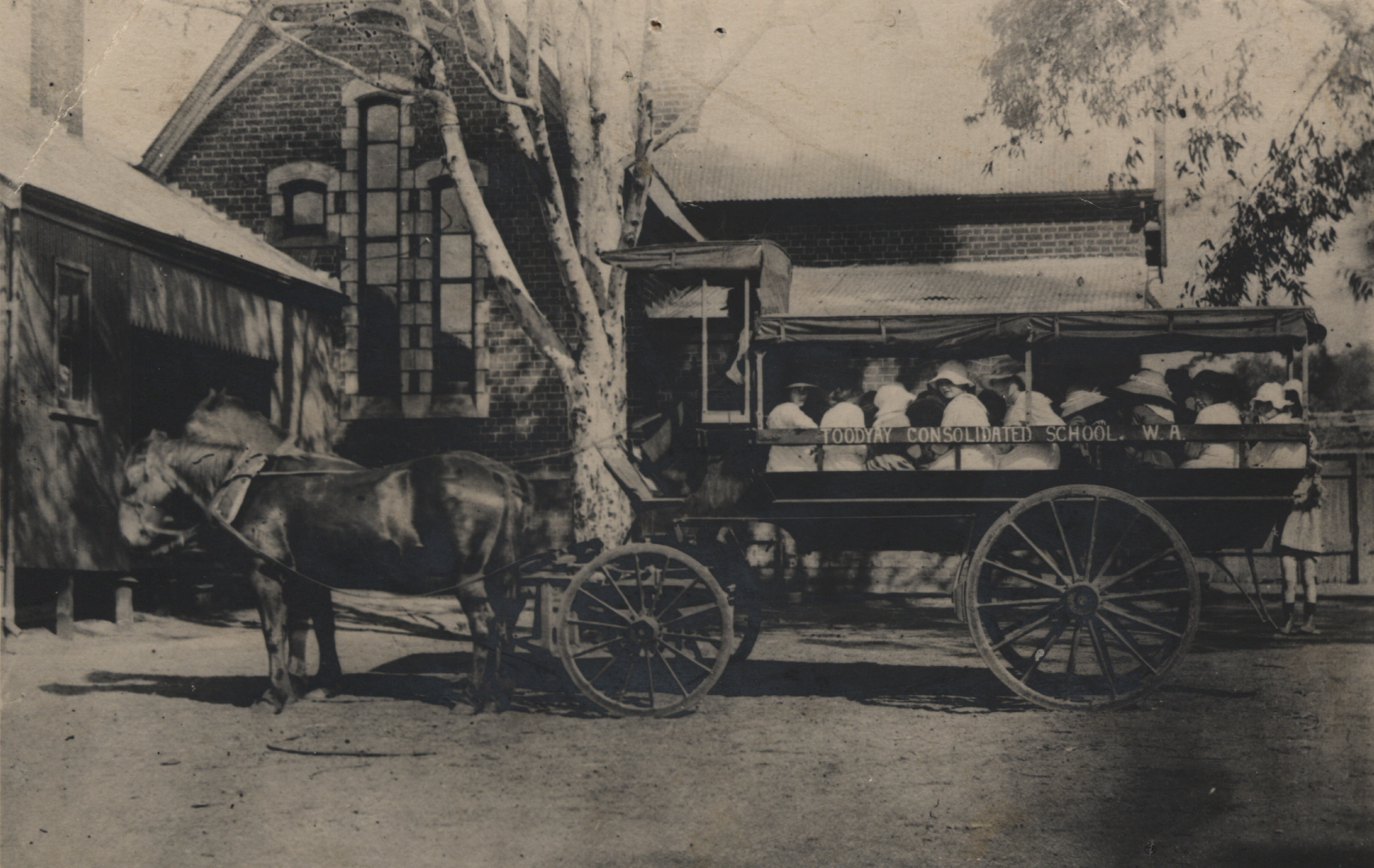
Toodyay consolidated school, 1920

In 1920 the school was declared Western Australia's first consolidated school, taking students from smaller schools in outlying areas. Such consolidation provided more efficient teaching than multiple smaller schools. Initially, West Toodyay School was closed and the children taken to Duke Street each day by bus. The same was done for other schools later; the increased student numbers necessitated addition of another classroom, and a wooden pavilion was moved from Bunbury in 1923.

A Parents and Citizens Association was formed in 1921, and a school board was elected in 1923. Also in 1923, the school was provided with electric light.

An accident on 6 August 1931 devastated the school and community; the school bus collided with a train and five children were killed. Their names were Laurie Cook, Ewen McIntosh, Allen Fawell, Norman Waters and John Lee. The school was closed for two days as a mark of respect, and a memorial plaque was placed on the school wall.

In 1947 the Wattening School closed, and its 21 students transferred to Duke Street. With the increasing numbers of students it became apparent that a new school was required, and by 1949 a site for the new school had been chosen. In 1953, the Duke Street school had 203 students; in 1954 the new Toodyay District High School opened and Duke Street closed.

=== Post-school, 1955–1964 ===
From 1955 to 1959, various parts of the school site were leased to local groups, such as the St John Ambulance Association, the Toodyay Repertory Club, and the Toodyay Basketball Association. In 1959 the Repertory Club bought the property.

=== Church, 1964–2007 ===
In 1962 the local Methodist Church on Duke Street was demolished to make way for the new standard gauge railway; the Methodist Churches Trust bought the school building from the Repertory Club for use as a chapel, with the first service held on 15 November 1964.

The building was classified by the National Trust in 1977.

By 1979 the building was known as the Uniting Church, the Methodist Church having merged with other churches in 1977 to form the Uniting Church in Australia. The same year a paved courtyard garden was built at the rear, and named "WAY Court" to commemorate WAY 79, the Western Australian sesquicentennial celebrations. Around that time the front room of the building was used by local community groups, including the craft group and the Toodyay Naturalists Club.

In May 1993 a fire destroyed most of the Toodyay District High School and so the Duke Street building was again used, temporarily, as a school while the high school was rebuilt.

In 2007 the Uniting Church sold the property to a private owner.
