= Toodyay Gaol =

Lock-up in Western Australia 1851 to 1861

Coordinates: 31.5230°S 116.4311°E

Toodyay Gaol stood on lot R66, close to the first Convict Hiring Depot, in the original townsite of Toodyay, now known as West Toodyay, in Western Australia. Although generally referred to as a gaol, it was technically a lock-up, holding prisoners only until they were brought before the resident magistrate (after which, if appropriate, they were transferred to Fremantle Prison).

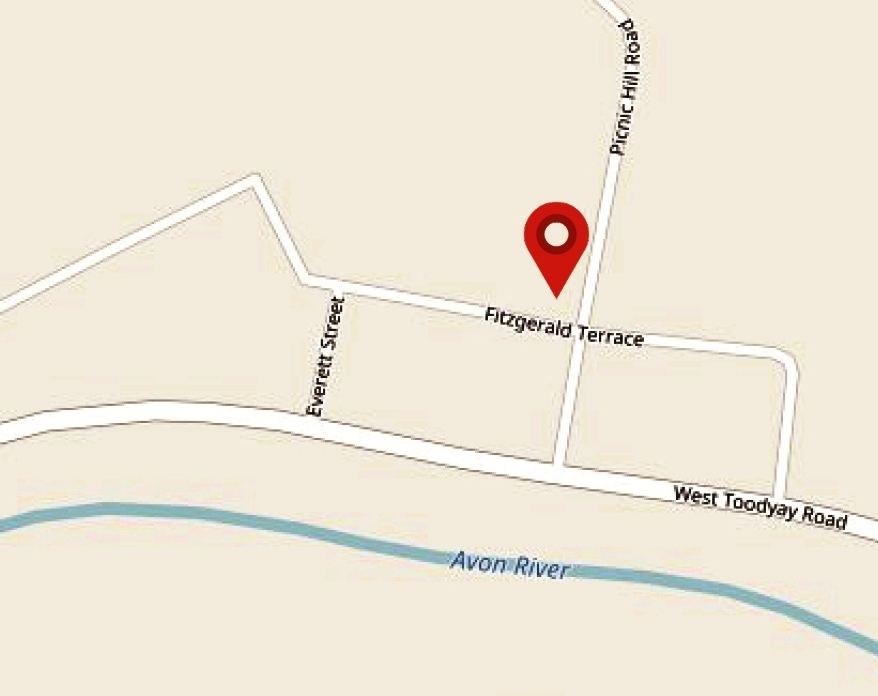
Location of the Toodyay Gaol, 1852 - 1861

Construction of the new gaol began on 23 December 1851. A number of ticket-of-leave holders were withdrawn from the road parties to carry out this work. Other masons and mechanics were on hand.

The new gaol was built to a standard plan used also at York. The building was of stone with a shingled roof. Due to the lack of a ready source of lime, it was necessary to use clay as a mortar. It was a large building containing twelve solitary cells with floorboards throughout. An extra cell was added for the holding of Aboriginal prisoners. A two roomed warder's quarters and store were attached. A brick paved exercise yard was laid, and the whole complex surrounded by a high brick wall. No provision was made for a courthouse or office and Magistrate Joseph Strelley Harris was forced to use the gaol storeroom as a substitute.

The Toodyay Gaol was the largest building in the township and was completed by December 1852. Pensioner Guard John Jones was appointed as its warder on 8 December 1852 and, even though he was lame, he carried out his duties to the best of his ability. However, further alterations were made to counteract the ease with which Aboriginal prisoners were able to escape. Several cells were lined with boards, the yard extended, and the wall heightened to 15 feet (4.6 m). Iron rings replaced those made of wood.

The Toodyay Gaol remained in use until 1861. By this time, the town of Newcastle had been gazetted, and the police had transferred their quarters to the new townsite. As a temporary measure, a three celled lock-up was constructed within the Barracks of the Toodyay Convict Hiring Depot situated in Newcastle. For a number of years, the town of Newcastle found itself without an adequate lock-up. The lack of police supervision in "Old Toodyay" caused the closure of its last hotel, The Queen's Head.
