= James Forbes (storekeeper) =

James Forbes (1828-1906) was an Enrolled Pensioner Guard who had arrived in the Swan River Colony in Western Australia aboard Pyrenees on 28 June 1851. Formerly a private of the 77th Regiment, he was 23 years of age. Soon after he was stationed at Toodyay, his pension expired and he was dismissed. A request for reinstatement was denied him. For a while, Forbes earned a living as a carter.

In November 1857, Forbes was granted ownership of lot R44. The following year, he borrowed 100 pounds from Henry Saw to build a substantial brick house. The house contained four good-sized rooms, one of which he decided to use as the store. He took care to fence and trench the property, the latter being most necessary due to the periodic flooding of the stream close by. The store stood at 31°31′26″S 116°25′44″E, adjacent to the Toodyay Valley School and up-river from the Queen's Head hotel. Forbes claimed it to be the best fitted store in the district. Passing trade and the supply of provisions to the school provided some guarantee of steady income. Forbes supplemented this income with his work as a carter. His main competition came from the supplies offered by James Everett at the Queen’s Head.

On 22 November 1858, Forbes married Margaret Kemp, a young Irish girl who had arrived in May of that year. Almost overnight, Forbes was beset by debts accumulated by his new wife. He made it known that, as from 30 December 1858, he would not be answerable for these debts. In his frustration, he attempted to sell the store. However, his efforts failed.

On 23 February 1860, Forbes appeared in the Toodyay Police Court before JS Harris, JP, and L Lukin, JP. He was charged with selling spirituous and fermented liquors from an unlicensed store. The offences had occurred on 22 February. Police Constable Sullivan had visited the store four times that day and each time he had been served by Mrs Forbes. He had purchased and paid for one bottle of gin, one bottle of ale, and one bottle of porter. Further evidence was submitted concerning Forbes stocking and selling items of such like. Indeed, John Herbert was reported to have been seen drinking there. However, John Morris, employed by Forbes, gave evidence to the contrary. Nevertheless, Forbes was found guilty as charged and fined a sum of thirty pounds together with court expenses of nineteen shillings and sixpence.

During the next few years, Forbes applied for and was granted several nearby allotments. These included Toodyay sub-lot 3 which abutted lot R44 and measured 8.1 hectares (20 acres). He also obtained locations 390 and 143, much of which stood to the rear of sub-lot 3.

On 18 August 1868, Forbes sold the store on lot R44, together with the three other properties within its vicinity, to Saw for 250 pounds. Two years later, Forbes purchased lots R24, R25, R27 and R28, which he eventually sold to John Herbert Snr in 1892. Forbes was able to acquire other land in the Avon Valley, which he farmed for a living.
