= Reserve and well, Toodyay =

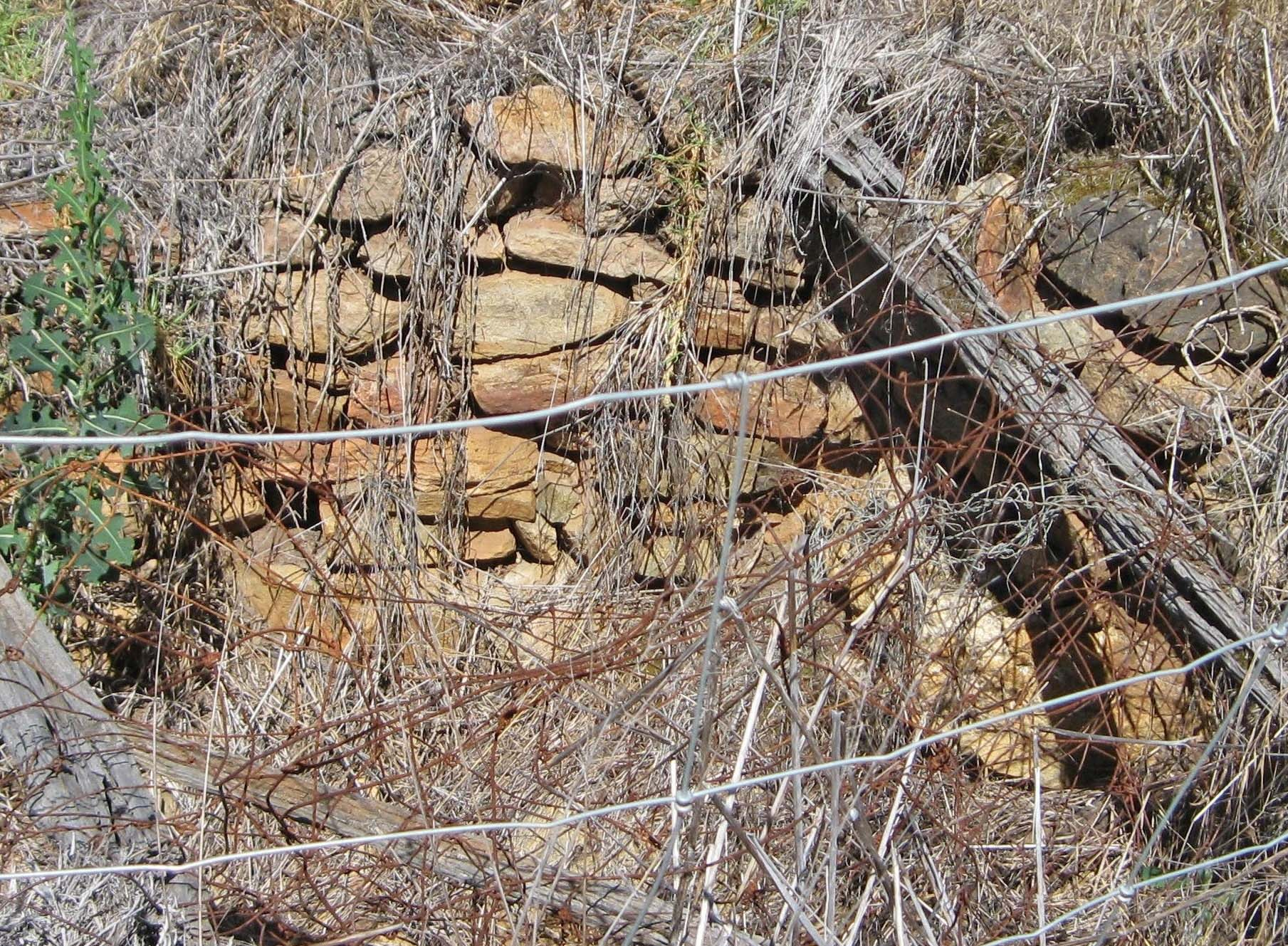
Remains of the stone-lined well, 2015

An area in West Toodyay, Western Australia, was gazetted as a Class C Reserve, for water and public utility purposes from 1898 to 1992. A stone-lined well at 31.52281°S 116.42579°E, positioned on what was originally lot R76, exists to this today. It is, however, no longer in use. The well is close to the boundary with what was originally lot R1 on which a spring once arose and flowed into the Avon River. It is very likely that the well had supplied water for a long time, possibly during the 1850s, the days of the convict hiring depot and The Queen's Head hotel.

On 6 May 1898, lots R75 and R76 were officially gazetted as a Class C Reserve, no. 5610, for water and public utility purposes. The classification came about due to the Parks and Reserve Act of 1895. The Act was the state's first legislation in relation to reserve management, where a reservation was considered to be the setting aside of Crown land for a specified purpose, generally a public purpose.

On 21 November 1913, the Reserve was vested with the Shire of Toodyay. On 26 June 1992, that order was revoked and the Reserve cancelled. The land is now unallocated Crown land.
