= Samuel Ferguson's cottage =

Coordinates: 31.5243°S 116.4224°E

Sam Ferguson's cottage was built in the latter part of the 1800s on lot R12 in the original town of Toodyay, now known as West Toodyay, Western Australia. Its walls were whitewashed and its roof was thatched. Roses, almond trees and a flurry of old English flowers produced such a wonderful display that artists from all around flocked to paint it. The cottage was the home of Samuel Ferguson and his wife Ellen. It was situated on what was originally Toodyay town lot R12 on the west corner of River Terrace (now Toodyay West Road) and what is now called Cottage St. On the opposite corner stood the old buildings of John Herbert's Royal Oak inn.

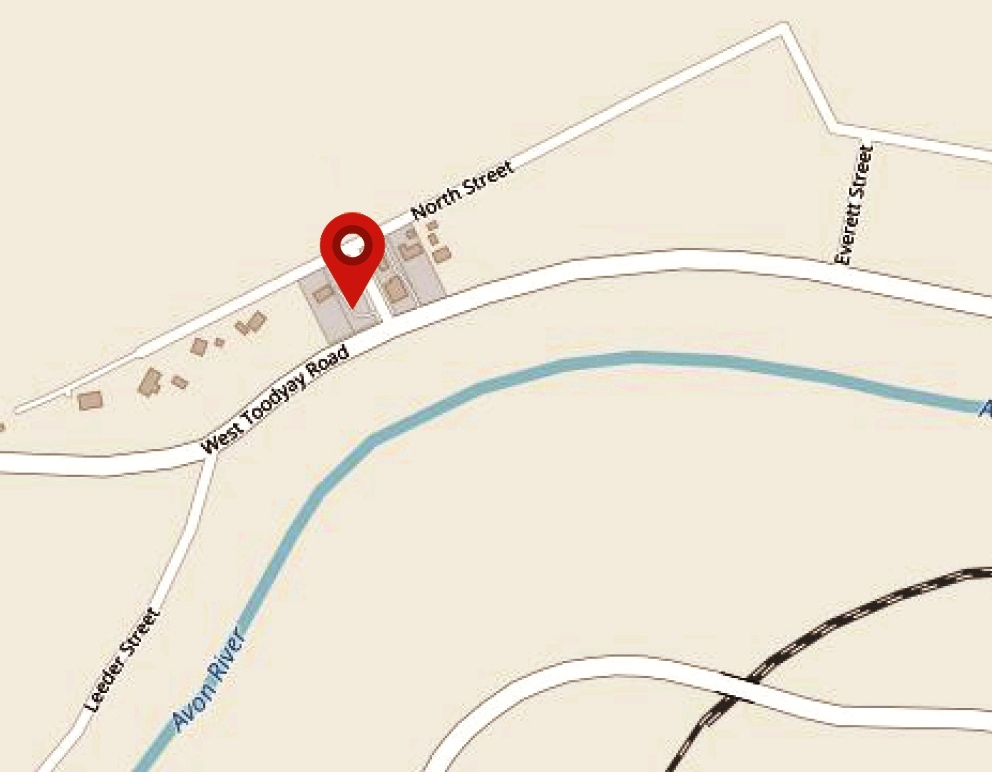
Location of Samuel Ferguson's cottage, West Toodyay, built late 19th century

Lot R12 was first granted to George Gooch on 15 March 1852. Earlier, he had found work as a shepherd at Mokine, near Northam, before taking up a pastoral lease with his brother John in the Toodyay district. Two sons, George Joseph and Robert John, were born to George and his wife Eleanor née York. Gooch was a man who actively took part in the local affairs of Toodyay. He died in 1861 at the age of 41 years. His wife remarried in 1864, after which all properties were sold.

The property of lot R12 was then purchased by John Davis, brother of Charlotte Davis. At the time of his marriage to Jane Thorpe in 1853, he was working as a sawyer. After suffering the loss of part of a leg in an accident he became known as "Peg Leg", the one legged wagoner. His sister, Charlotte Davis, wife of John Herbert, lived across the road at the Royal Oak. After the loss of his publican's license, Herbert also earned his living as a wagoner. Davis was granted lots R6, R7 and R8 in 1867. He later took up farming in the Toodyay district.

After their marriage on 21 November 1894, the cottage became the home of Samuel Thomas Ferguson and his wife Ellen, daughter of Thomas and Rose Cook. Ellen was 22 years of age at the time of their marriage. Samuel Ferguson was the son of Alexander James and Sarah Ferguson and the grandson of Thomas and Jane Ferguson, who had arrived in the colony on 1 February 1831. His grandfather established a 621-acre (251 ha) property in Toodyay, which he named "Rose Valley". Samuel Thomas Ferguson was born in Toodyay on 30 April 1871. His marriage to Ellen produced eight children. In addition they fostered twelve year old Sybil Donegan, daughter of George and Ada Donegan, after Ada died.

Ellen Ferguson died in 1938 after a short illness. She was aged 66 years. Her funeral was held in St Stephen's Anglican Church, Toodyay, followed by interment in the Anglican portion of the Toodyay Cemetery. Samuel Thomas Ferguson died on 29 July 1948, aged 77 years.
