= Western Australian Heritage Trails Network =

Network of 19 heritage trails and places

The Western Australian Heritage Trails Network is a network of heritage trails and places in Western Australia that was initially funded by the Australian Commonwealth/State Bicentennial Commemorative Program for the 1988 Australian Bicentenary. In many cases local communities and councils collaborated with the National Trust of Western Australia to research and develop local trails.

The production of signage and literature for the 1988 celebrations set significant standards for heritage identification for the state of Western Australia.

The network was overseen by the Heritage Council of Western Australia. The trails included walk trails, and others that spanned distances requiring a vehicle to traverse.

The trails were grouped into regions - South Metropolitan and North Metropolitan in Perth, Midlands (including parts of the Wheatbelt region), South West and other regions of Western Australia.

== Trails ==
- Albany Heritage Trail - titled First settlement Heritage Trail
- Arthur Head Heritage Trail (Fremantle)
- Augusta-Busselton Heritage Trail
- Broome Heritage Trail
- Bunbury Heritage Trail
- Guildford to York Heritage Trail
- Moora Heritage Trail
- New Norcia Heritage Trail
- Perth

- Central Perth Heritage Trail
- East Perth Heritage Trail
- Northbridge Heritage Trail
- West Perth Heritage Trail

- South coast Heritage Trail
- Subiaco Heritage Trail
- Swan River Heritage Trail
- Swan Valley Heritage Trail
- Toodyay Pioneer Heritage Trail
- Yarloop Heritage Trail
- York Heritage Trail
- York to Goldfields Heritage Trail
