= West Toodyay School =

Former school in Western Australia

Coordinates: 31.5312°S 116.4207°E

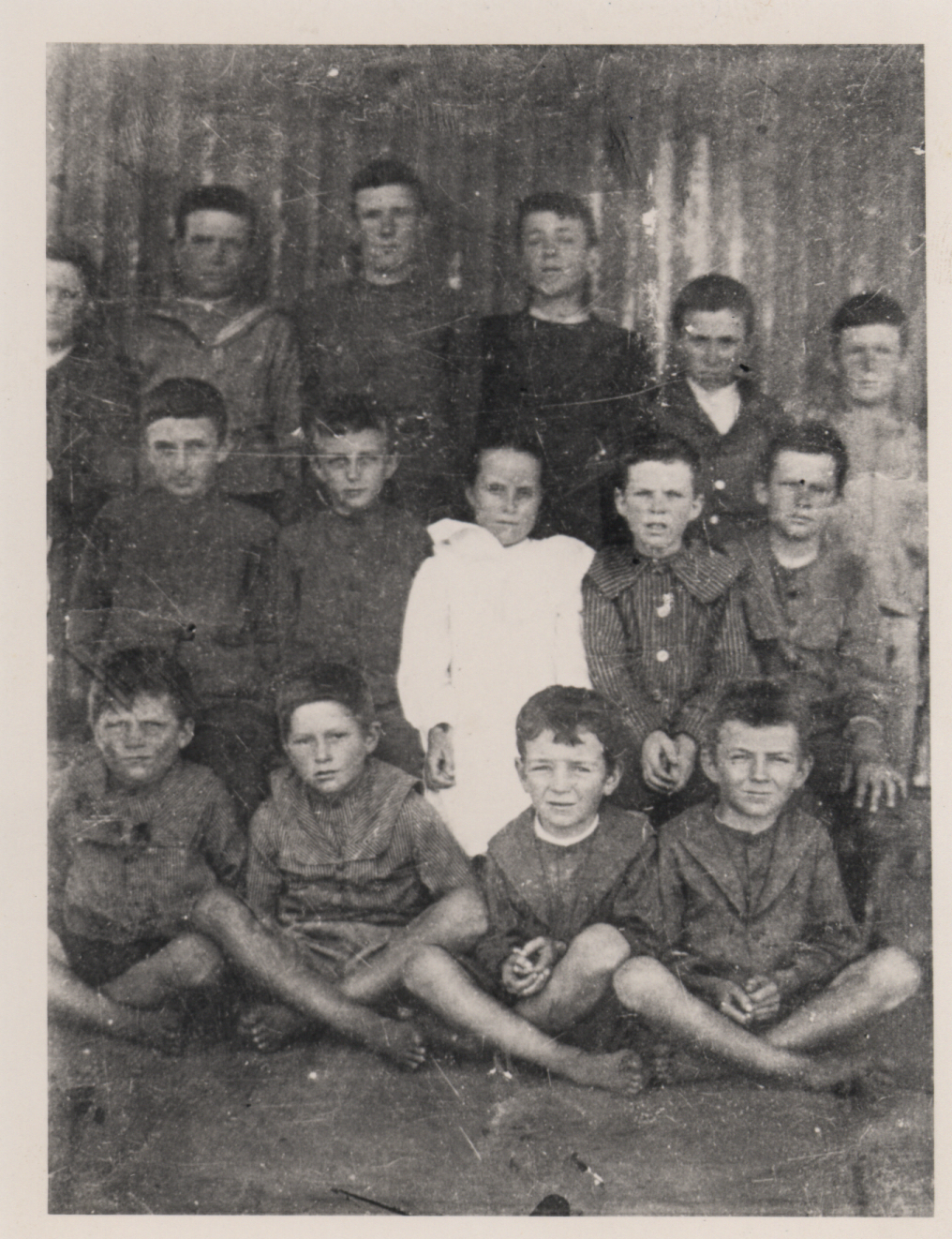
Students c. 1900

The West Toodyay School, originally named the Toodyay School, was a government school in West Toodyay in Western Australia. It opened on 6 February 1899 as a replacement for the original Toodyay Valley government school, which had been closed on 23 October 1898. The new Toodyay School was situated near the left bank of the Avon River on what was previously known as Toodyay suburban lot 30. It was within easy distance of what became the site of the West Toodyay Bridge.

Toodyay suburban lot 30 was gazetted as Reserve 4155 for a school site on 30 June 1897. The following November, the Government allocated 290 pounds to cover the cost of building the school. A simple building, timber framed and clad with galvanised iron, it contained one room measuring 35 by 20 feet (10.7 m × 6.1 m) and had several windows and a door. The room was lined with wood. A porch was added later. Various garden plots were established, all of which were fenced in an effort to keep out marauding cattle. In 1908, living quarters were built for the teacher at a cost of 275 pounds. The quarters consisted of a bedroom, kitchen, living room and bathroom.

In September 1910, the school changed its name to the West Toodyay School in accordance with the change of the town's name to West Toodyay.

Kate Waters planted a lemon-scented gum at the school on Arbour Day 1912. On occasion, other eucalyptus trees were also planted and are easily seen from Julimar Road. Tenders were called for the addition of a screened verandah in April 1912, most probably as an attempt to circumvent the problem of flies at various times of the year.

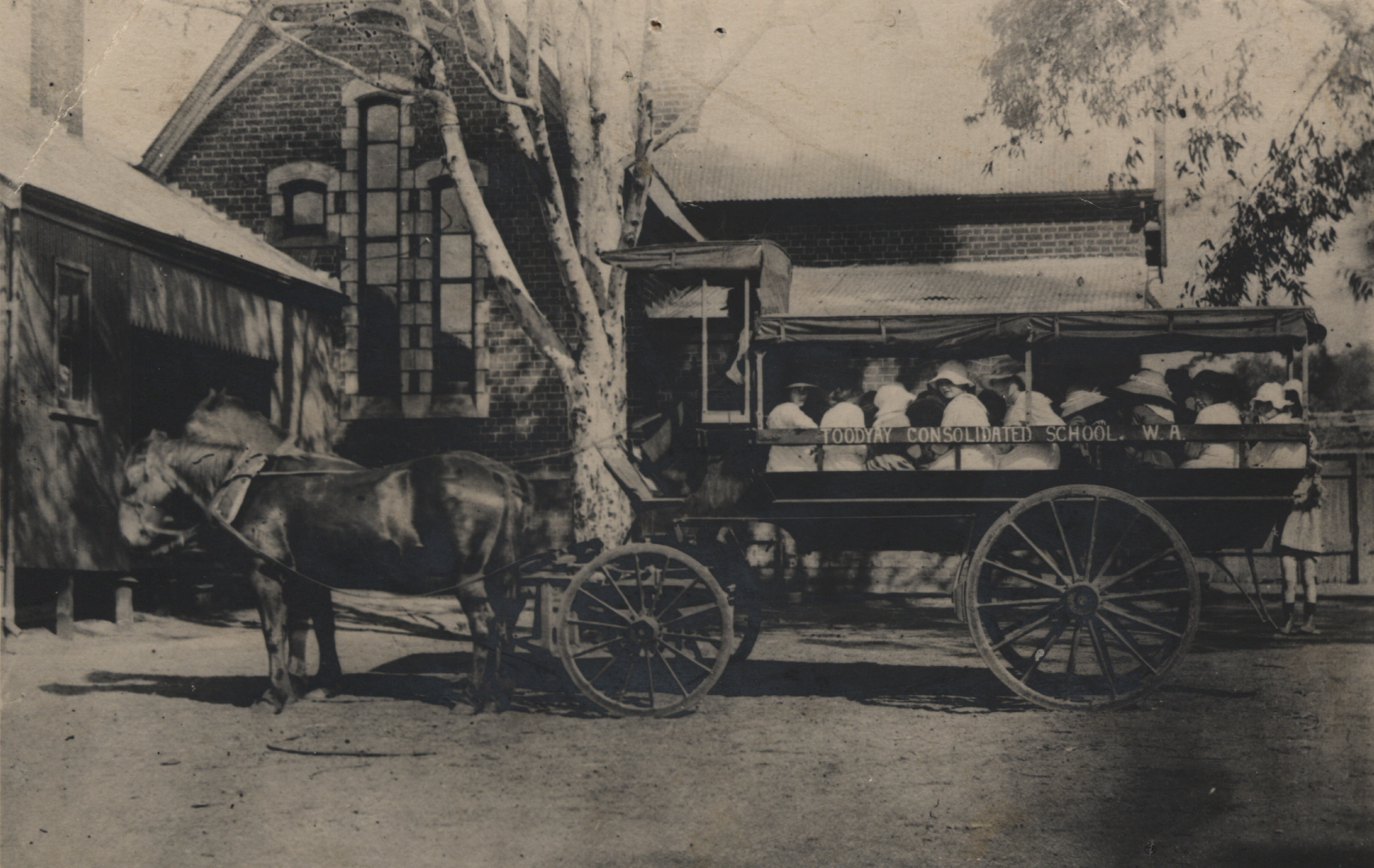
The first school bus in Western Australia, driven by Fred Green

The Government's decision to amalgamate small local schools led to the closure of the school on 27 August 1920. At a meeting held in December 1919, parents voted to close the West Toodyay School by fifteen votes to one. Thereafter, approximately twenty-five pupils were transported in a horse-drawn wagon to the Toodyay (formerly Newcastle) township upstream. Here they attended the newly consolidated Toodyay State School, the first of its kind in the state. The wagon, driven by Fred Green, proved to be the first school bus in Western Australia. In 1930, a charabanc replaced the old horse-drawn wagon.

In 1921, the Public Works Department called for tenders to transfer the West Toodyay School quarters to the school at Yoting, a small town between Quairading and Bruce Rock. Later, in 1929, material derived from the original school building was used in the construction of a shearing shed at Woodendale, Nunyle.

Today, Julimar Road passes through the centre of what was once Reserve 4155. The former South West Terrace has been realigned and given the name of River Road.

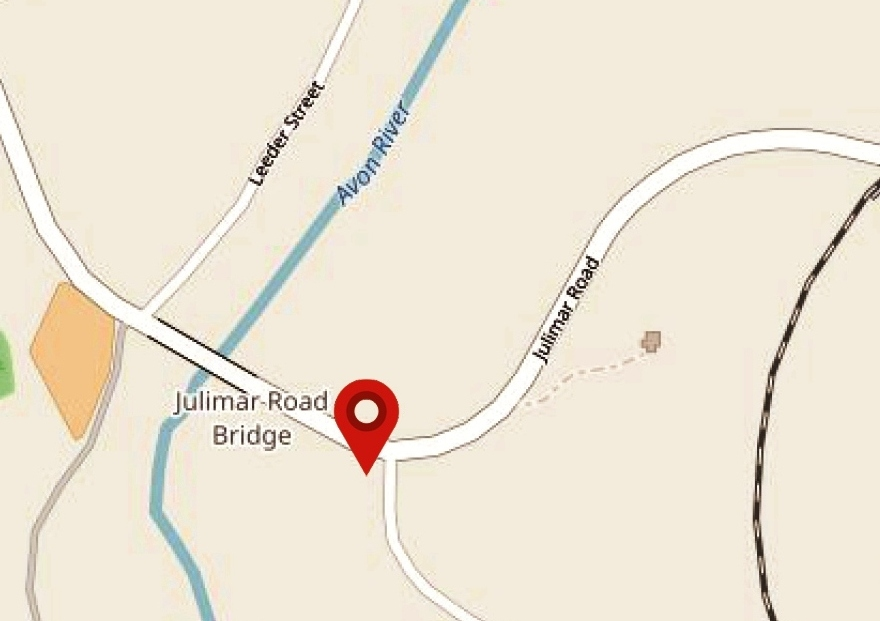
Location of the West Toodyay School 1899 - 1920

A portion of Reserve 4155 has been conserved by the Shire of Toodyay and heritage listed as the West Toodyay School. A plaque on a stone marks the location of the school.
