= The Royal Oak, Toodyay (1849–1851) =

Former building in Toodyay, Western Australia

Coordinates: 31.5273°S 116.4197°E

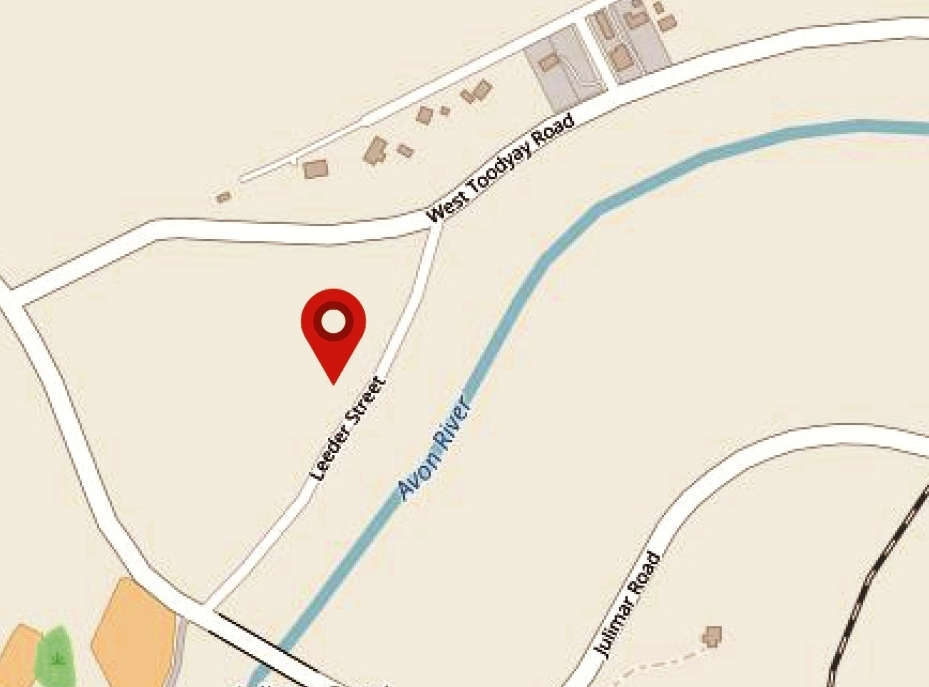
Location of the first Royal Oak Inn established within the original Toodyay township

The Royal Oak, established in 1849, was the first inn set up within the original townsite of Toodyay in Western Australia. The relatively modest building was owned by William Herbert and stood on lot R28. Most inns established in the 1840s were simple cottages where a spare room or two had been put aside for use by guests. Although Herbert had applied for lot R28 in 1845, it was not officially granted until after the first survey of the township had been carried out in 1849. His publican's license, however, was granted in July 1849.

Situated close to the ford crossing and opposite the Military Barracks, the inn profited from passing trade as the settlers travelled to and from Perth and the upper Toodyay Valley. It drew extra income from the yearly sheep washing event when a washpool was set up nearby. The setting up of the Toodyay Convict Hiring Depot in 1851, helped ensure its future.

Herbert's health deteriorated less than twelve months after the inn was opened. In June 1850, his younger brother, John, took over the publican's license. In November 1851, the property was sold to James Croll. The publican's license was cancelled. William Herbert died shortly after, leaving behind a wife and five children.

Croll chose not to use his newly acquired premises as a licensed inn. The building was washed away completely as a result of the Avon River floods of 1857, 1859 and 1862.
