= Everett's Cottage =

Heritage building in Toodyay, Western Australia

Coordinates: 31°31′21″S 116°25′30″E

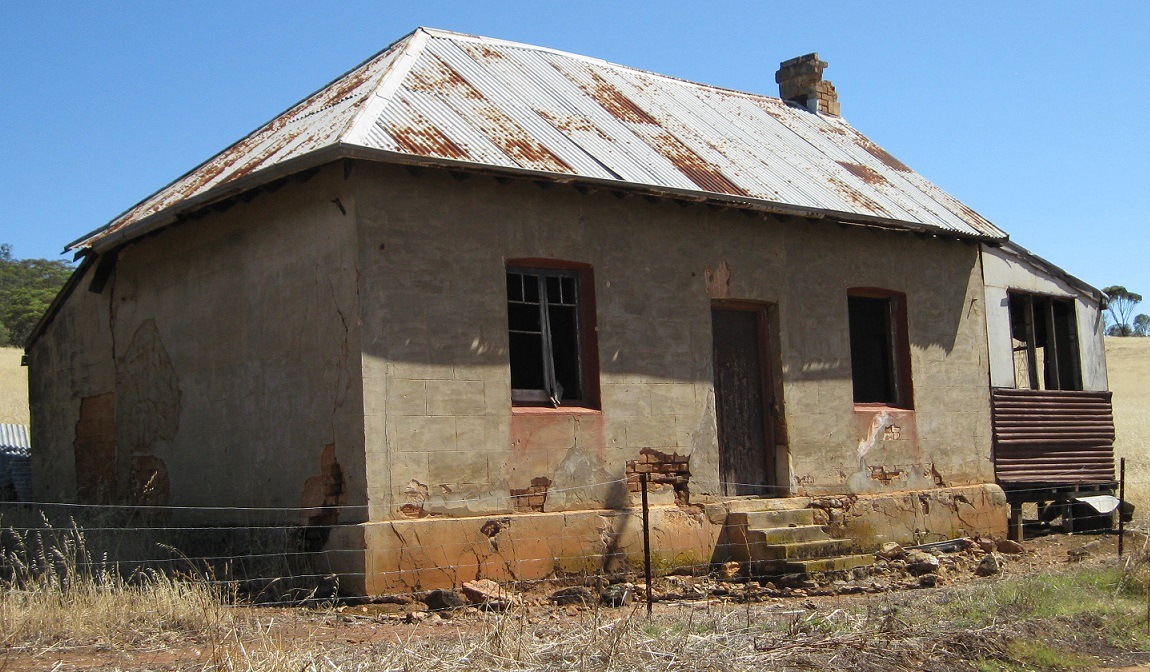
- Interactive map of the Everett's Cottage area

Everett's Cottage is the only remaining building from the original township of old Toodyay, now known as West Toodyay, in Western Australia. Situated in North Street on the three-acre allotment of Suburban Lot 1, it stands immediately behind the site of the former Queen's Head Hotel. Suburban Lot 1 was registered to James Everett on 3 July 1860.

== History ==
Everett, licensee of the Queen's Head Hotel, erected the cottage during the 1860s. It was built of brick on stone foundations, both of which are rendered. Wrought iron has since been used to replace the original roof covering. The cottage contains two rooms each with its own window. The front door enables direct access from the street. A kitchen area stands to the rear. Little significant change has been made to the cottage over the years, apart from two relatively small timber additions to the side and rear. The main structure, however, is still evident. It seems probable that Everett chose to live in this cottage while operating his business from the site of the Queen's Head Hotel. Everett lived alone due to the fact that his wife and all but one member of his family appear to have remained behind in England. Everett's son, George, arrived in 1864 and worked with his father in Toodyay before setting up his own farm in Beverley.
