= Toodyay Naturalists Club =

Natural history club in Toodyay, Western Australia

Toodyay Naturalists Club was founded in 1968 in Toodyay, Western Australia.

The inaugural meeting was held at St Stephen's Anglican Church Hall.

In 1979, the club published a book about the local environment.

It was the main mover in the creation of the Pioneers Arboretum.

In 2004, it conducted a symposium on James Drummond.

It celebrated 30 years of activity in 1998, and 40 in 2008.
