= The Queen's Head, Toodyay =

Defunct hotel in West Toodyay, Western Australia

Coordinates: 31.5237°S 116.4254°E

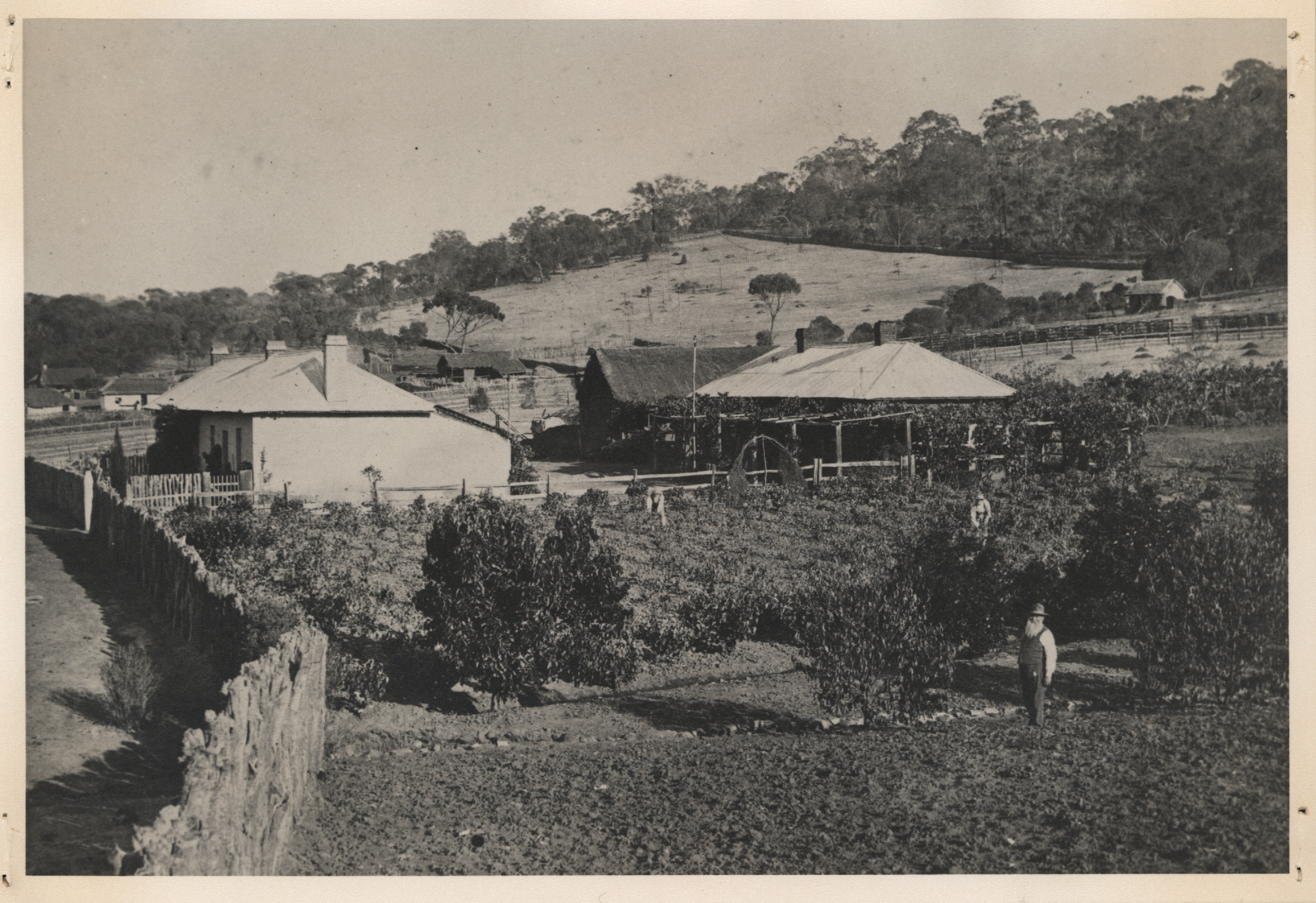
Queen's Head circa 1870s, with James Everett in the foreground

The Queen's Head was a hotel in West Toodyay in Western Australia in the latter half of the 19th century.

== James Everett ==
James Everett opened the Queen's Head for business in 1855. It was situated on lot R3, on the right bank of the Avon River. A shrewd businessman, he had placed his hotel within easy reach of the Enrolled Pensioner Guard Barracks, which, for the time being, continued to be maintained at the original site of the Toodyay Convict Depot. His action took much of the ready trade from the other two hotels, The Royal Oak and the Gum Tree Tavern.

Born and raised in Coggeshall, England, Everett had arrived as a convict on board Pyrenees in June 1851 for his part as a member of the Coggeshall Gang. His crime was larceny, for which he received a sentence of seven years and transportation to Western Australia. Prior to his transportation, Everett had been a gardener by occupation. His father had been a farmer and stock owner. Everett applied the knowledge gained from his background as he endeavoured to carve out a living for himself in the colony. He had left his wife and three children behind in England, only one of whom, George, ventured to join him in Western Australia.

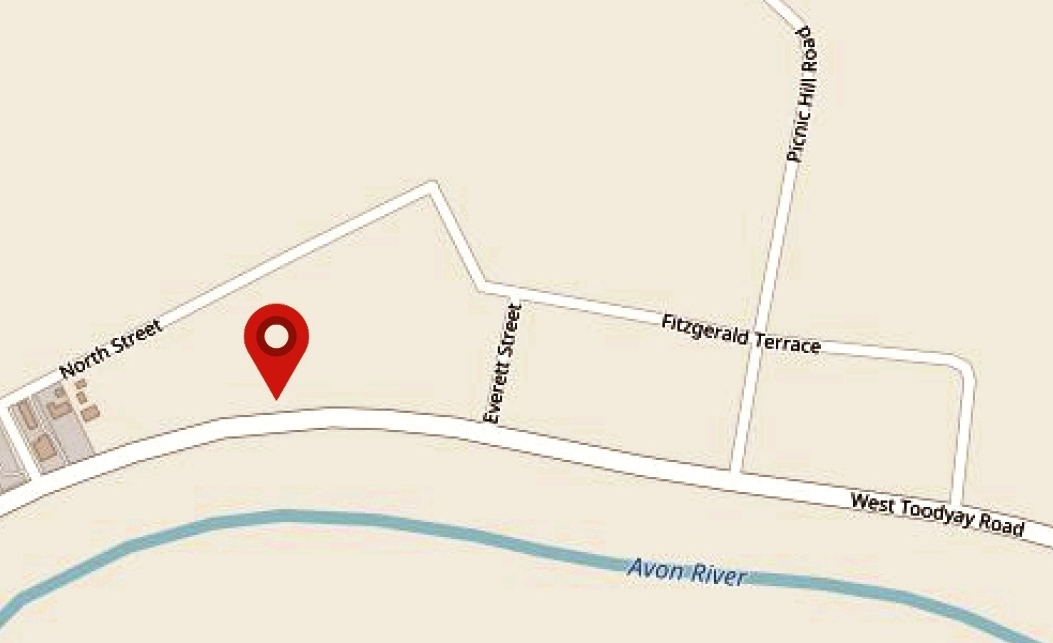
Location of the Queens Head Hotel, which opened in 1855

Along with all the other convicts who were on board Pyrenees, his ticket-of-leave was granted immediately after disembarking in Fremantle. A conditional pardon was granted on 23 April 1853. By this time he had made his home in Toodyay and was working as a boot and shoemaker.

In 1854, he applied for his first grant of land, lot R3. After its approval in June 1854, Everett erected a brick building with a shingled roof. His subsequent application for a publican's license caused controversy. Toodyay resident magistrate, Joseph Harris, was of the opinion that two public houses were sufficient. However, Everett persisted and, in 1855, he opened the Queen's Head for business. He advertised himself as a publican, storekeeper and general dealer. A wide range of boots and shoes were offered for sale. Meetings at the Queen's Head were encouraged.

Everett was a most enterprising man. He soon acquired lots R2, R4 and R5, which enabled him to expand the hotel. In the following years Everett would acquire further properties elsewhere in the Toodyay area.

In November 1856, Governor Kennedy gave the order to close the Toodyay Convict Hiring Depot, which had been relocated three miles upstream. The corps of Enrolled Pensioner Guards was no longer required and the Government therefore chose to put it up for sale. Avon Location 69 together with lot R1 were sold to John Davidson, a local settler. With news of the closing of the depot the enterprising Everett understood the potential impact to his business, Everett endeavoured to sell up and return to England. The sale did not eventuate.

In November 1858, on the day after the Toodyay Show, Everett hosted an elaborate tea party. The tea party was repeated the following year. In 1860, after the demise of the Royal Oak and the closure of the Highland Laddie, all the social events of the Agricultural Society were held at the Queen's Head. Everett made it a grand affair indeed. The annual meeting was held at 2pm on 30 October, and followed by the annual dinner that evening. The tea party with games and amusements was scheduled for 5pm the next day. It all culminated in a grand public ball held on 1 November, for which Everett was most proud.

Everett's success was short-lived. In 1861, he was denied the renewal of his publican's license due to the fact that there was no longer a police presence in the old township of Toodyay. The police had been transferred to the newly established township of Newcastle and it was considered unwise to operate a hotel under such circumstances. The Queen's Head was forced to close.

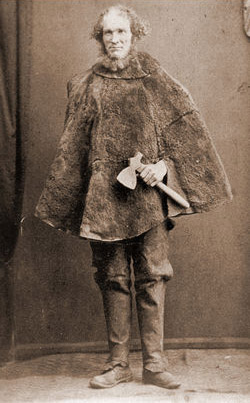
Moondyne Joe

For a number of years, Everett continued operating his former hotel as a shop offering a wide range of goods. He acquired further land grants and pastoral leases and soon derived added income as a farmer and stockowner of cattle, horses, bullocks and a few sheep. Unfortunately, one of those leases included land regularly used by Joseph Bolitho Jones, otherwise known as Moondyne Joe. Moondyne Joe was most irate when he discovered that his horse traps, from which he derived a living, now stood on privately held land.

Everett had made an enemy indeed and on the night of 7 September 1866, his store was ransacked. Moondyne Joe had struck. A variety of goods such as guns, ammunition, food and clothing were stolen. Joe and his party were planning to escape across the border to South Australia. He was also intent on evening the score with Everett whose losses turned out to be considerable. Two weeks later, Moondyne Joe was recaptured and sent directly to Fremantle Gaol, where a specially prepared and secure cell awaited him. Everett made other such enemies and spent quite some time debating issues in the courts of Perth.

Everett continued to live at the Queen's Head where he cultivated his own vineyard. He also acquired other town lots, which he developed and farmed. Fruit trees and the production of wine and raisins were doing well in the district. In 1872, Everett applied for a colonial wine license. The Queen's head was back in business.

When the Toodyay Road Board was formed in 1871, Everett was elected as one of its founding members. A total of seven men were elected, only two of whom were expirees. Everett was one and Dan Connor was the other.

In 1886, Everett realised that his health was failing. He made up his mind to sell all his goods and properties and return to England. Toodyay town lots R1, R2, R3, R4, R5, R71, R72, R73 and R74, suburban lot 1, and Avon location 69 were among those properties. On many of them were cultivated vineyards. He estimated their worth to be 1500 pounds.

Everett achieved his aim and sailed for London on 19 July 1886.

Everett died on 13 April 1893 in Tilkey, a village just north of his hometown of Coggeshall. His death came 11 days after his Wife's.

== Thomas Donegan ==
In 1886, Thomas Donegan purchased all Everett's properties for the sum of 1500 pounds. He had sold the ownership of the Freemason's Hotel to his brother James Donegan. James had formerly operated the Bailup Inn on Toodyay Road.

Charlotte, wife of Thomas Donegan and youngest daughter of John and Charlotte Herbert, brought an air of respectability to the Queen's Head. The Donegan family made it their home. The Queen's Head was now a long narrow structure containing about twelve rooms and many an occasion was celebrated under its roof. Concerts, dances, meetings, dinners, church services were attended by the people of Newcastle.

Donegan died on 26 July 1891. Although a mere 40 years of age he was a man of considerable means. Social life in the old township waned dramatically after his death.

The Queen's Head stood for quite some time afterwards. In 1910 it was occupied by a retired watchmaker.
