= The Royal Oak, Toodyay (1853–1860) =

Former hotel in Toodyay, Western Australia

Coordinates: 31.5244°S 116.4229°E

The Royal Oak established in 1853 by John Herbert was the second inn of that name in West Toodyay. It was also known as Herbert's Hotel. It stood on lot R11, upstream from where the first Royal Oak (owned by Herbert's brother, William) had been until it closed in November 1851.

Location of the second Royal Oak Inn established within the original Toodyay township.

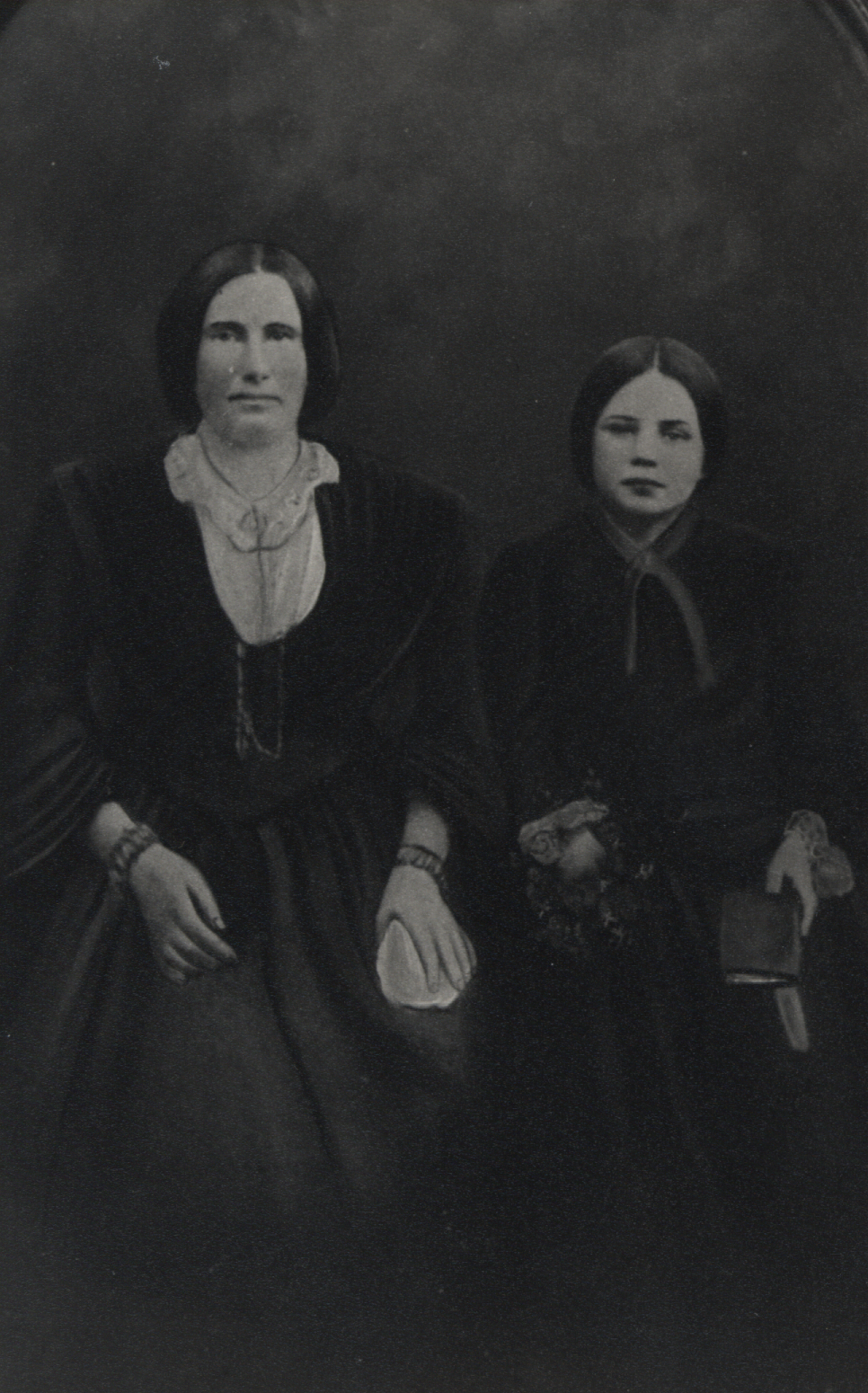
Charlotte Herbert and her daughter Esther, circa 1856

Herbert had arrived in the colony in 1839 and married Charlotte Davis in 1845. Davis is credited as being the first female to have landed on the shores of the new colony. Herbert was granted lot R1 in 1849 and Avon Location 69 in 1850, both of which he sold to the government in 1851 for a handsome profit. After the sale of his property to the government, and the sale of the original Royal Oak, he built and moved into a cottage on lot R26. However, he was a man of ambition and before the year was out he began building an inn of his own.

The Royal Oak was comparatively large in size. It was very likely built of brick as, by that time, bricks were becoming available in the Toodyay Valley. The roof would have been either thatched or shingled. Stables, yards and other such structures were erected. Accommodation and good food was offered together with items such as wine, corn, porter, groceries and clothing. Various goods were auctioned at the inn. Herbert later acquired lot R10.

Public meetings began to be held at the Royal Oak. Of significance was that held on 15 November 1853 for the purpose of forming an Agricultural and Horticultural Society. Full attendance of farmers and stockowners of the district was requested. A splendid dinner was served. The Toodyay, Northam and Victoria Plains Agricultural Society was formed, over fifty members having enrolled.

In 1854, a fair was held in conjunction with the annual meeting. Prizes were awarded for quality farm animals. Horses, cattle and sheep were offered for sale. A sumptuous meal followed the meeting. On 30 October 1856, the first Agricultural Ball was held and Charlotte Herbert served one of the best dinners ever eaten on such an occasion. Indeed, much of the success of the Royal Oak can be attributed to the skill and business management of Charlotte Herbert. She was aided by their son, John Thomas. Her daughters, Esther, Martha and Charlotte were sent to Perth for their education.

During the ensuing years, the Agricultural Society played a significant role in the affairs of the Toodyay Valley. It exercised a voice on such issues as roads, land sales, the convict system, the Emigrant's Depot, bush fire control, native dogs and so on. The annual meetings were always held at the same time of the year. The events accompanying them became increasingly spectacular, and people of note regularly attended. The meetings were chaired by Joseph Strelley Harris, Toodyay's resident magistrate. The Royal Oak was now fondly referred to as Herbert's Hotel.

All went well until 1860. John Herbert renewed his publican's license in February. However, by June 1860 it became known that he had become mentally deranged due to his heavy drinking. It was also revealed that Charlotte Herbert had failed to notify the District Magistrate of her husband's removal to the Fremantle Lunatic Asylum. It was she who had been running the business held in her husband's name, both prior to and after her husband's removal. As this was illegal, the license was quickly withdrawn and the Royal Oak was forced to close.

John Herbert was released from the asylum in 1862, after which Charlotte Herbert received an account for thirteen pounds. She claimed hardship and the matter was dropped. The family continued to live at the Royal Oak for many years to come.

Charlotte Herbert died on 1 April 1885. John Herbert remarried on 16 January 1888 in Toodyay to Emily Diana Huggins, a school teacher. He died in Northam on 1 January 1896, aged 75 years.

The building was used as a private residence for many years, but by the 1930s all that was left of it was the dining room.
