= Toodyay valley =

Part of Avon Valley, in Western Australia

Toodyay valley is an older term for the section of the Avon River valley in Western Australia, where the town of Toodyay, and its original site ("Old Toodyay", now West Toodyay) are located.

The "Toodyay valley" name has been used to refer to the full stretch of the valley as a potential agricultural zone, for co-operative ventures.

The term was in use earlier in agricultural co-operative ventures as well as anecdotal histories of local inhabitants.

By the late 1920s and 1930s there was also usage of "Avon Valley" as much as "Toodyay valley" for the areas surrounding Toodyay.

The term used in the late twentieth century was "Avon Valley" to include the towns of York, Northam and Toodyay.

== Limits ==
Originally "Old Toodyay" or "West Toodyay" was the western end of the valley, with the eastern limits of Newcastle (as Toodyay was originally known) marking the eastern end of the valley.

The river and Eastern Railway enter the valley from the east, and move through to the west towards the Avon Valley National Park.

Current limits can also be defined by the road junctions, such as the southern side of the valley with the Toodyay Road going west towards Perth, and the Northam-Toodyay Road following the river eastward.
