= Toodyay Valley School =

First government school in Toodyay, Western Australia

Coordinates: 31.5240°S 116.4293°E

The Toodyay Valley School was the first government school in Toodyay. It opened on 1 October 1855 with 55 children enrolled. Boarders were received on moderate terms.

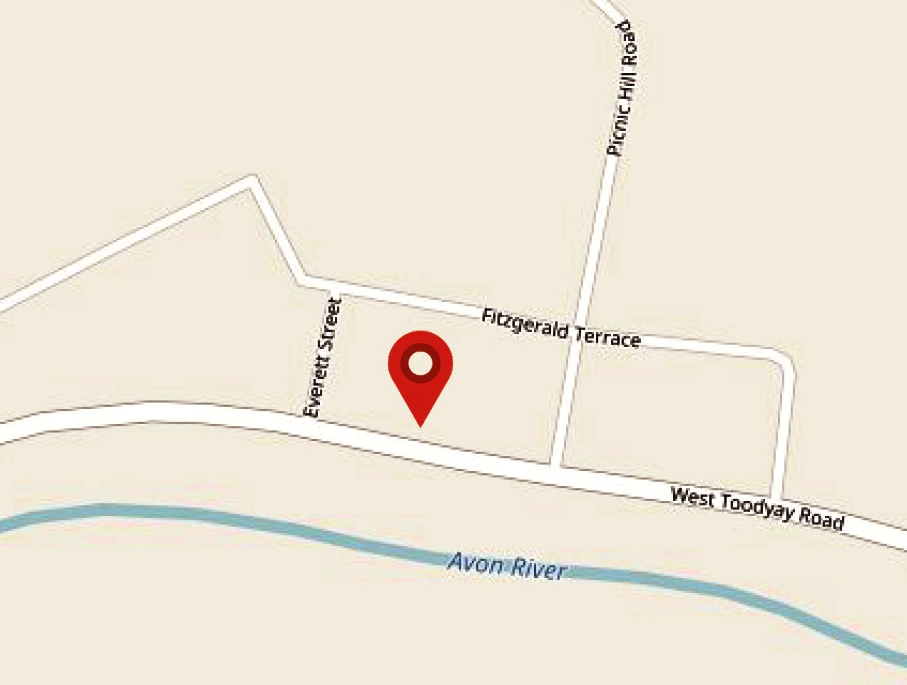
Location of the Toodyay Valley Government School 1855 - 1864 & 1885 - 1898

Other attempts had been made to establish a school in the town of Toodyay. Lot R19 was set aside for school purposes. A Sunday school was established, where Mrs Harper, Mrs Lukin, Mrs Clarkson and her daughter gave instruction. However, none were successful.

When the opportunity arose to set up a government school in Toodyay, a meeting was organised to take place at the Royal Oak on 10 June 1853. The meeting was informed that the Government was offering a sum of 250 pounds to any district wishing to build a school house. All plans needed to be submitted for approval. To qualify for the grant, a special committee had to be formed and approved by the General Board of Education. No fewer than three members should serve on the committee, their principal duties being to ensure that the school was run according to the rules drawn up by the General Board of Education. The community was also expected to raise 300 pounds towards funding the school. The Toodyay School Committee subsequently formed, consisted of the resident magistrate Joseph Strelley Harris, Anglican minister Charles Harper, Samuel Phillips and James Drummond Junior.

Because the local community was expected to contribute a reasonable amount to its cost, a further committee was formed to organize the necessary fund raising. The Toodyay committee was an active one and very quickly raised the 300 pounds needed for the community's share of expenses.

Plans were drawn up and the site chosen. The committee gained approval to build the outer walls of pug. The school building was planned to contain four good-sized rooms at the front, all shaded by a verandah. To the rear were four smaller rooms in the form of a lean-to. Flooring would be weatherboard.

The site chosen was lot R45, owned by Alexander Warren, who had generously donated the use of the land to the school. The Board of Education later introduced a rule stipulating that the land on which a school stood could not be sold for other purposes unless and until it had been specifically released.

In November 1854, Mrs Drummond laid the foundation stone for the new school. The ceremony took place at one o'clock and nearly 300 people celebrated with a very large afternoon tea. Many sat on the grassy slopes of the Toodyay Gaol as they viewed proceedings. Further fundraising efforts would follow, including a monster tea party and a two day fete to be held on 25 January 1855. Five hundred people were expected to attend.

The school was opened on 1 October 1855, once a teacher had been found. Apart from establishing a building, the chief obstacle in running a school had been the inability to procure a fit and proper teacher. Ticket-of-leave men of good repute often filled the role as schoolmasters. The School Committee thought itself fortunate indeed in obtaining the services of Alfred Grey, a schoolmaster who seemed well qualified. He claimed to have the ability to offer his pupils a good English and classical education which included Greek, Latin, geography, arithmetic, geometry, sciences, writing and drawing.

However, Grey proved to be an imposter. In 1856 he was dismissed and the school was closed for a short period of time.

In February 1857, Joseph Wylde took up the position of schoolmaster at a salary of forty pounds per annum. The stipend paid by the Government varied according to the number of pupils attending each month. His pupils numbered five boys and seven girls. A weekly fee was also paid by the parents of pupils. However, children of the poor or destitute were admitted free of charge. Books were supplied by the local government and sold to the pupils at cost price. Examinations were held regularly.

School began at nine o'clock, with a lunch break from twelve until one o'clock. The day finished at three-thirty. Two vacations per year were granted, one about 21 June and the other at Christmas. Good Friday, Christmas Day, the Queen's birthday and the anniversary of the foundation of the colony on 1 June were observed as holidays.

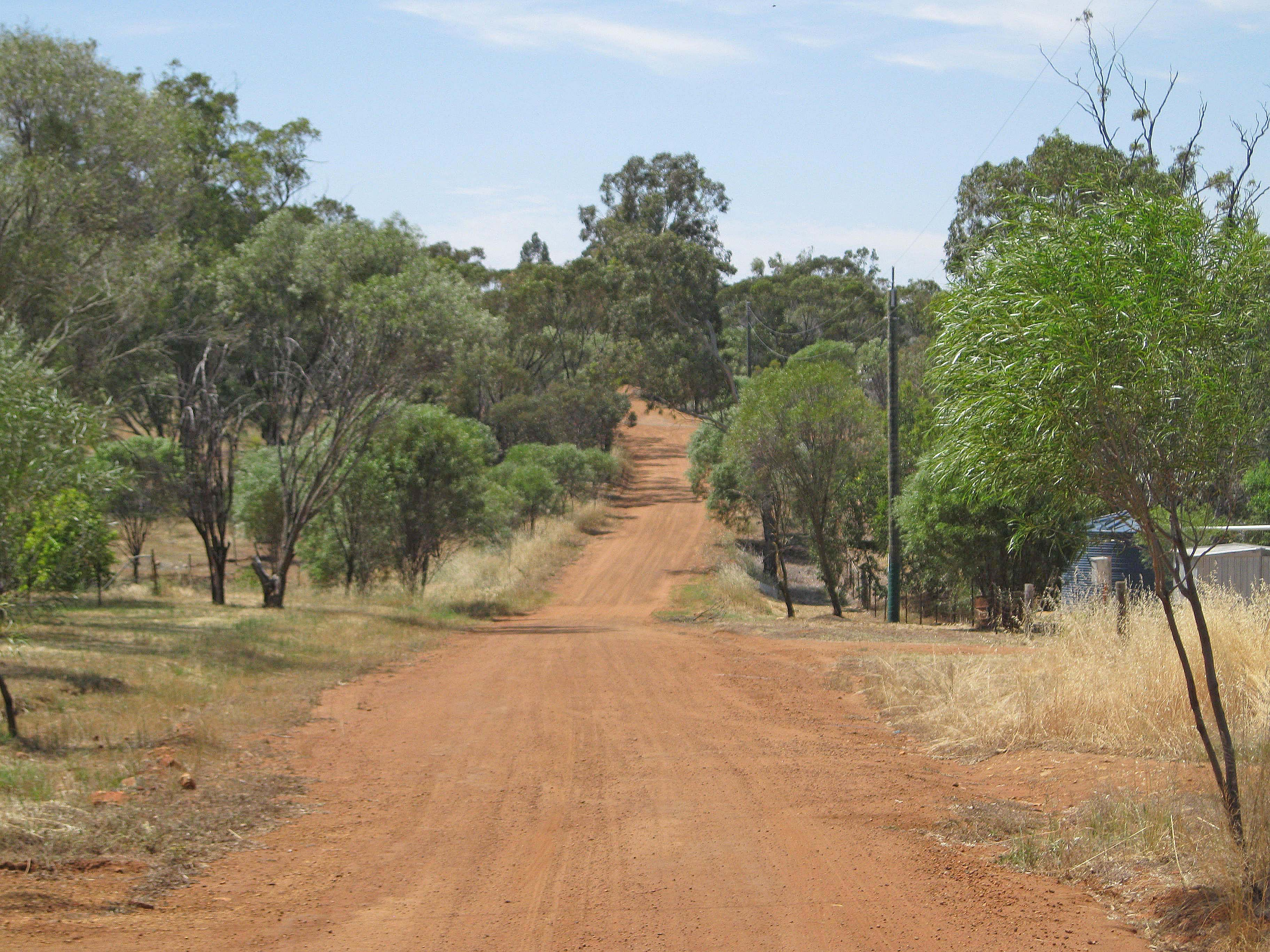
Fitzgerald Terrace and the gully created by the stream crossing over it, 2015

In July 1857, the Avon River flooded to a level not seen before. Although the school stood well above the badly swollen river, it sustained a good deal of damage caused by the torrents of water gushing down from a series of steep ridges behind, a phenomenon which can still occur to this day.

A gully beside the school was severely eroded, causing the school's foundations to be seriously undermined. The north and west walls cracked and became dangerously unstable. Although it was suggested that the pupils be moved to one of the unused Toodyay Convict Hiring Depot buildings, (Note: At the time, the Convict Depot was temporarily closed, and only being used as a receiving depot.) the damaged school continued to be used. Two years later, a similar flood occurred, yet the school remained open.

A teacher's salary was often quite meagre and, for the last three and a half years, Wylde had supplemented his income by keeping the accounts for the Queen's Head. When James Everett was denied the renewal of his publican's license in 1861, Wylde's services were no longer required. Soon after, a disagreement arose between them concerning Wylde's book-keeping entries. It led to ill feeling and several court hearings. However, no misdemeanour was proven. The school was forced to close temporarily when Wylde resigned his position as teacher to become the district constable at Newcastle. Early in 1862, Aquila Bull took up the position of schoolmaster at the Toodyay Valley School with twelve pupils in attendance.

Half way through 1864, the lessening numbers of children attending the school caused Bull's salary to be reduced to twenty-five pounds. He resigned to take up the position of manager of Drummond’s flour mill. The loss of its teacher forced the school to close and subsequently be transferred to Newcastle. However, the school at Newcastle also failed to attract enough pupils and in December 1864 it, too, was forced to close. Lot R45 was released for sale after it was agreed that the land was not suitable for a school building due to the risk of flooding.

The Toodyay Valley School reopened in July 1885 after a social revival in the old town of Toodyay brought more children to the area. Elizabeth McKnight began by teaching nine boys and eighteen girls in the Sancta Maria Church building. She and her sister taught students there for twelve years. The school closed on 23 October 1898.
