= Joseph Strelley Harris =

Pastoralist and resident magistrate in Western Australia

Joseph Strelley Harris (1811–1889) was a pastoralist in Western Australia. Between 1840 and 1888, he was a resident magistrate, serving in the towns of Williams, Toodyay, Busselton and Kojonup.

== Early life ==
Harris was born on 23 November 1811 to Dr Joseph Harris and Lucy (née Strelley). In 1833, he arrived with his parents at Fremantle on Cygnet, and moved to Guildford.

== Drover and pastoralist ==
In 1838 he was contracted to deliver mail from Albany to Perth, and in 1839 pioneered the droving of sheep from Albany to the Avon and Swan districts. He also drove stock from Swan to York, although losing many of them to poison.

By 1839, Harris was a pastoralist at the farming town of Williams. While based there he met with the botanist James Drummond who was on one of his collecting expeditions from his home Hawthornden in Toodyay. The men shared an interest in the causes of stock poisoning and conducted experiments with the known poison plants in the region.

== Resident magistrate ==
In 1840 Harris was appointed acting resident magistrate in Williams, then resident magistrate in Toodyay from 1850 until early 1861 when he was transferred to Busselton. He also served at Kojonup for a time. Although known for his sociability, Harris was regarded as an,

eccentric, tactless man, unpopular with people in authority for the unsolicited advice he offered, on subjects ranging from roadmaking to Aboriginal farm settlements, and from mail routes to commercial hunting of kangaroos [...].

However, as a former pastoralist and drover, Harris must have gained practical experience about some of these matters before becoming involved with government bureaucracy.

=== Toodyay ===
Harris arrived in Toodyay in August 1850 following the death of the previous resident magistrate, Frederick Slade. Slade and those before him had been retired naval or army officers who had been granted large tracts of land in lieu of a pension. Their role was to represent the law and provide annual reports about the district to the colonial secretary. Initially, while the population was relatively small, the workload was light and business was conducted from home. When Harris arrived he found there was no residence for the magistrate so he had to stay in one of the wayside inns. This was the cause of one of his early altercations with the locals. He found these establishments lacking suitable accommodation for travellers, so on 30 December, the day licenses were renewed and when the locals came to town to celebrate the end of the year, he refused to grant the inn owners their license to trade. This resulted in an uproar, with a petition circulated on New Year's Day refuting his claims.

Harris rented a cottage from James Drummond Jnr of Hawthornden, and as his workload increased he engaged John Acton Wroth as his secretary and clerk in court.

In June 1850 convicts had begun arriving in the Swan River Colony and were despatched to the rural settlements, including Toodyay, where a temporary hiring depot were set up in what is now West Toodyay. Harris was charged with finding a suitable place for a permanent convict hiring depot, and in 1852 a site was selected 2 miles (3.2 km) upstream from the town.

As Harris settled into his role and was able to assess local conditions he reported back to the colonial government with suggestions for improvements. This included the need for a better route to Toodyay to avoid the steep descent at Jimperding. A new route was eventually surveyed that passed through the depot site before heading to the Toodyay settlement. Originally called New Road, it was renamed Stirling Terrace after the new town of Newcastle, gazetted in 1860, was established around the convict depot.

Some of Harris's proposals to the government related to bushfire control. This was a necessity given the destructive fires that regularly occurred during the hot dry summer season. After a particularly destructive bushfire in November 1850, Harris wanted an Act of Council that would require settlers to create firebreaks around their properties and along the lines of roads, whether public or private; and to compel settlers to provide assistance to their neighbours if there was a fire within two or three miles of their property. Failure to help would incur a heavy fine.

Another initiative was a fire brigade, made up of ticket-of-leave holders and Aboriginals, that could be hired from the depot. The brigade received rations and a small monthly allowance from the government. When there were no destructive fires during the 1852–53 summer Harris reported that "the warm and well clothed appearance of the country now, as compared to its blackened face three years back, ought to be convincing proof of the utility of the Fire Brigade." The following year Governor Charles Fitzgerald ended the contribution, as a cost-cutting measure and because of concern settlers in other towns might want to set up fire brigades requiring government support. As the government had assigned extra police to the Toodyay and Northam area, it instructed that daily bushfire patrols were to be added to their duties in summer, including the apprehension of anyone found deliberately lighting a fire. There were bad feelings between the police and Harris, and when a huge bushfire broke out and burnt a large swathe of countryside from Northam to Bolgart (a settlement north of Toodyay), the police made no attempt to find the culprit. After this Harris gained permission for the convicts at the depot to be called out to fight fires. After the devastation of the 1856 Coondle bushfire, local fire-fighting teams were organised by the leading settlers in the district.

Harris was president of the Toodyay, Northam & Victoria Plains Agricultural Society. While resident magistrates were expected to contribute their time to local boards and organisations, they were also required to be generous subscribers to the development of their district. Harris had limited means and found this a drain on his income. He sought a government allowance to cover these expenses citing examples such as "£5 to the school, £5 to the exploration fund, and £1 to the purchase of the cemetery land at 'Nardie'". Other subscriptions were in the wings for the parsonage, the public library and the services of a doctor.

=== Busselton ===
In 1861 Harris was transferred to Busselton, his last posting as a resident magistrate. He had a number of disputes with the Town Trust members and its chairman, David Earnshaw, over the new Queen Street (Busselton's main thoroughfare), and organised the volunteer effort responsible for planting the street's picturesque avenue of peppermint trees. He proposed the laying of the main road from Busselton to Bridgetown.

When he retired in 1888, a profile written by the Busselton correspondent for the Western Mail indicates Harris's personality and style of governing had not changed.

If his abilities as a magistrate were not exactly of a high order we ought perhaps to blame (more than himself), the Government which placed him in a position for which he never was and never would have been fitted. His genial hospitality will, however, always be gratefully remembered by a very large number of our settlers.

Harris died on 9 December 1889.

== General references ==
- Erickson, Rica, Eye of the Law – Resident Magistrates of Toodyay. Unpublished manuscript owned by Toodyay Historical Society.
- This article incorporates text by Robyn Taylor available under the CC BY SA 2.5 AU licence.
