= Toodyay Convict Hiring Depot (1851) =

Convict hiring depot in West Toodyay, Western Australia

Coordinates: 31.5235°S 116.4261°E

In 1851, the Toodyay Convict Hiring Depot was set up in the original township of Toodyay, now called West Toodyay. Temporary accommodation for the Enrolled Pensioner Guards was also constructed and surveys were carried out to enable more permanent accommodation to be built close by. The Enrolled Pensioner Guards were men who had either completed their duty of service or who had sustained injury while on active service. They had then volunteered as guards on the ships transporting convicts to Western Australia. Once the men were released from permanent duty, other duties of a peace keeping or military nature were expected of them. Many of these men became warders in charge of convicts.

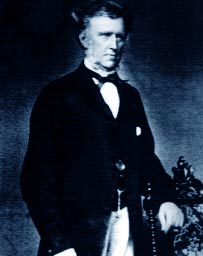
Charles Fitzgerald

The decision to turn the colony into a penal settlement occurred after a good many settlers petitioned the Government to do so. The colony had struggled to survive during the 1840s. Governor Charles Fitzgerald supported the proposal and the colony became a penal settlement in 1849.

The number of convicts sent to the colony was relatively small to start with. However, all that changed on 28 June 1851 when 293 convicts arrived on board Pyrenees. Their arrival had been unexpected. In addition, each convict was to receive his ticket-of-leave on disembarking at Fremantle.

== Setting up the Depot ==
Location of the first Toodyay Convict Hiring Depot in 1851

Fitzgerald decided to set up convict hiring depots in areas where men had the best chance of finding employment. Country depots were planned for York, Toodyay and Bunbury and approximately 40 men would be sent to each district. Ticket-of-leave men would then be hired out by local settlers to do whatever work was required by them. The remainder of the men were stationed in the Perth and Fremantle areas.

A convict hiring depot was about to be set up in the townsite of Toodyay. Michael Clarkson had been appointed assistant superintendent. The site selected was Avon location 69 and the adjacent lot R1, an area totalling 4.7 hectares (11.5 acres). Lot R1 was a narrow allotment with a fresh water stream flowing through it. It also provided access to Avon location 69 from River Terrace and the Avon River. The properties were originally owned by John Herbert, who had built a goodly sized cottage there. The cottage would provide immediate accommodation for the ticket-of-leave holders. Fitzgerald approved the acquisition of both properties on 4 August 1851. The sale of the properties to the Government had yielded a handsome profit for Herbert.

The party of men chosen to travel to Toodyay was held up by floods in Guildford. It was winter and torrential rain was falling. Eventually, on Monday, 18 August 1851, Fitzgerald gave the order to head off. They were under the charge of Clarkson and were accompanied by several bullock teams and their gear. They camped overnight at the Bailup Inn and possibly near Jimperding Hill. The men were required to negotiate the risky descent of Jimperding Hill. It was customary to chain huge logs behind each the wagon to prevent it overtaking the bullocks in front. On the evening of 20 August, the party of approximately 40 ticket-of-leave holders struggled into the Military Barracks in Toodyay.

Next morning, the entire party negotiated the rising waters of the Avon River to reach their destination 0.8 kilometres (0.5 mi) upstream on the other side. The crossing took most of the day and was achieved with great difficulty. The men were aided by ropes when negotiating the deepest parts of the river.

After settling in, the ticket-of-leave holders were put to work building straw huts to accommodate the expected arrival of the Pensioner Guards. The straw or rush huts were A-framed in shape and were erected using bush poles and had thatching that reached to the ground. Brushwood, grass tree needles and dry rushes were commonly used for thatching. At one end a canvas drape served as a door. A mud or stone chimney at the other end provided heating. The huts were a good size and surprisingly sturdy and long lasting.

== Enrolled Pensioner Guards ==
The straw huts, however, were only temporary accommodation as the Pensioner Guards were entitled to the offer of 1.6 hectares (4 acres) of allotments close to the depot site. The minimum payment of ten pounds required by law was compensated for by an allowance of ten pounds given towards the cost of building a two roomed cottage. The use of ticket-of-leave labour was allowed. Title was granted after seven years. Fitzgerald originally approved the marking out of 22 sites on the northern side of the Toodyay township. When the official survey revealed the existence of a steep hillside, the number of allotments was reduced to thirteen.

The arrival of the Pensioner Guards was delayed by further heavy rain and flooding of the Avon River. It was mid-October before they reached their destination, after which the Pensioner Guards were given the task of supervising and directing the ticket-of-leave holders under their command. After the completion of the straw huts, the men were divided into road parties to repair the local roads to the best of their ability. The roads, mere tracks, had been made almost impassable by the recent heavy rainfall.

== Ticket-of-leave holders ==
Conflict and ill feeling quickly arose between free workmen and the newly arrived ticket-of-leave holders. The free workmen felt that their jobs were being threatened by the rate of pay for ticket-of-leave holders being less than what the free workmen currently received. Before the month was out, a drunken brawl arose at the Bonnie Laddie owned by Alexander Warren. Magistrate Harris was called upon to effect the peace. The offending men were escorted to Fremantle Gaol and banned from returning to the Toodyay district.

It was necessary to build a secure gaol near the Toodyay Convict Hiring Depot. The lock-up at the Military Barracks was poor and insufficient for the needs of a convict hiring depot. Escapes were too easily made. Heavy drinking at the local inns proved to be the biggest problem. The building planned was, in fact, a lock-up. However, it was generally referred to as the Toodyay Gaol. A number of ticket-of-leave holders were removed from road work to assist with the work at the gaol.

== Transfer to another site ==
In early 1852, it was decided to transfer the Toodyay Convict Hiring Depot to a new and larger site, an area of Crown land designated as Avon location 110. Located approximately 4.8 kilometres (3 mi) upstream, it measured just over 18 hectares (45 acres) in size. Construction of the new convict hiring depot would be overseen by Lieutenant Edmund Frederick Du Cane. Building began in February of that year.

For the time being, the Pensioner Guards retained the use of the original depot site (in "Old Toodyay") for accommodation purposes. The area became known as the Pensioner Guard Barracks. However, the proposed Pensioner Guard allotments close to the former convict depot were sold off and new sites were selected adjacent to the new depot site. The cottages on these new allotments were not fully complete until 1856.

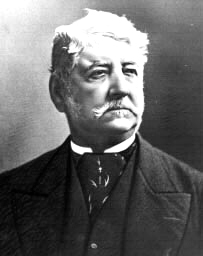
Arthur Edward Kennedy

The straw huts at the original convict depot site found further use during the years of 1853 and 1854 when an Emigrants' Depot was established in Toodyay. In July, August and September, an average of five men, fifteen women and fourteen children were in occupation at one time.

In November 1856, the decision was made to close the Toodyay Convict Hiring Depot together with that of York. Governor Arthur Kennedy was anxious to reduce growing debt. The corps of Enrolled Pensioner Guards was therefore no longer required in Toodyay. The Pensioner Guard Barracks were closed and the Government activated its sale. On 19 August 1857, Avon location 69 and lot R1 were sold to John Davidson, a local settler, for the sum of 116 pounds.

== See also ==
- Lynton Convict Hiring Depot
