= The Highland Laddie, Toodyay =

Defunct inn in West Toodyay, Western Australia

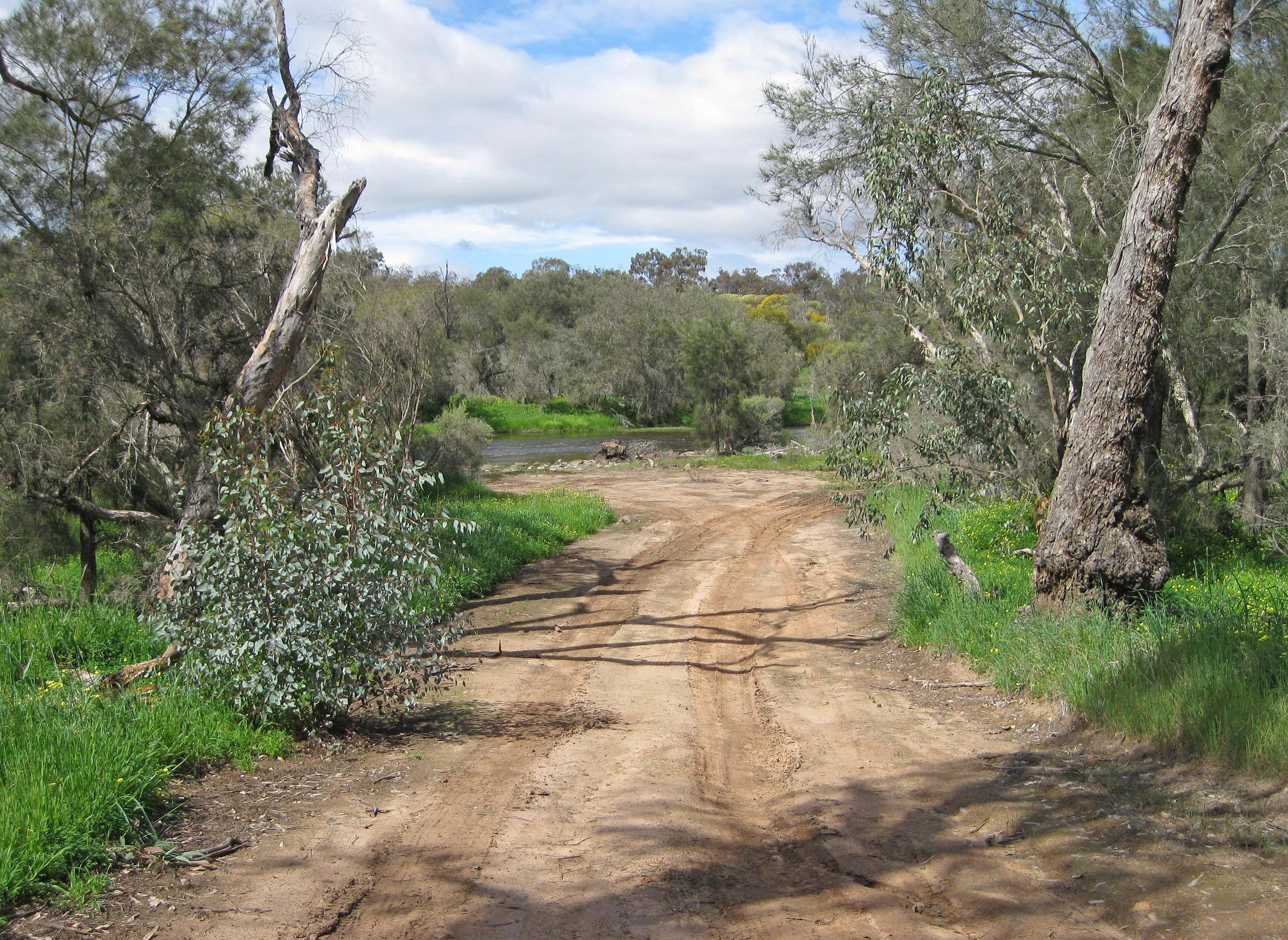
Northern approach to ford crossing from near the site of the Highland Laddie

The Highland Laddie was an inn in West Toodyay. The business was initially established in 1850 as the Bonnie Laddie, and also traded as the Gum Tree Tavern.

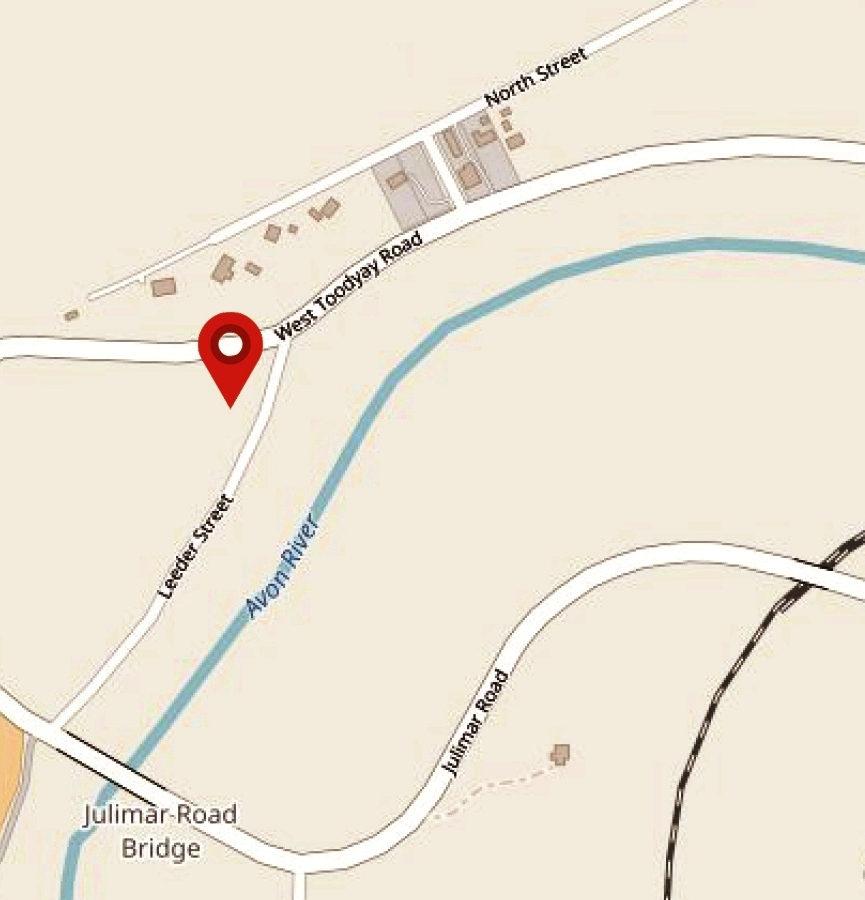
Approximate location of the Highland Laddie Inn

Alexander Warren had been granted lot R25 in the original townsite of Toodyay, Western Australia in October 1849. He very quickly applied for a publican's license, which was granted in early 1850, and named his inn the Bonnie Laddie. It stood at 31.5266°S 116.4202°E, close to the Royal Oak and not far from the ford crossing of the Avon River. Both inns were likely to have been built of rammed earth with a thatched roof.

Warren managed the inn for two years before advertising the property as either for sale or to let. His advertisements referred to the inn as the Toodyay Hotel. In April 1852, he leased the hotel to the partnership of Joseph York and William Rummer. When the partnership dissolved twelve months later, Rummer took over the lease. In doing so, he changed the name of the hotel to the Highland Laddie. Rummer terminated his lease at the end of 1854.

In 1855, Warren resumed management of his hotel and gave it the name of the Gum Tree Tavern. He also set about obtaining nearby lots R24, R27, R28 together with lot R10 and lot R45. In 1855 he exchanged lot R10 for John Herbert's lot R26. It seems very probable that Warren decided to operate the Gum Tree Tavern from the better quality building on lot R26 (31.5269°S 116.4200°E), instead of the original building on R25. He soon found himself in financial difficulties. By early 1856, his debt had amounted to almost 320 pounds.

On 18 September 1856, Warren's wife died giving birth to their child. The child also did not survive. Nevertheless, on 29 October 1856, he fulfilled his commitment to the Agricultural Society's festivities by hosting an excellent luncheon served up in superior style. More than 120 guests attended, including the Governor and a large party of ladies.

On 26 February 1858, an indenture was registered between Warren and the partnership of Joseph Farmaner and Walter Padbury whereby Warren was recorded as owing the sum of three hundred and nineteen pounds, a princely sum of money in those days. That same day, Isaac Doust signed an agreement to purchase lots R24, R25, R26, R27, R28 and R45 and take over the debt of three hundred pounds owed to Farmaner and Padbury. The mortgage was formally drawn up on 18 June 1858. The mortgage did not include lot R26. On obtaining his publican's license, Doust chose to name the hotel the Highland Laddie.

Doust renewed his publican's license in February 1859. However, he had borrowed a large sum of money and, before long, he found he could not meet his commitments. In September 1859, Doust was declared insolvent and all household furniture, goods, and effects were sold by auction at the Toodyay Fair of that year. The Highland Laddie went out of business and was washed away entirely in the disastrous flood of 1862. The majority of the town lots he had owned were put to auction by a mortgagee power of sale.

Doust later re-established himself in the Bridgetown district. He died in 1903, aged 90 years.
