= Toodyay Barracks =

Coordinates: 31.5276°S 116.4219°E

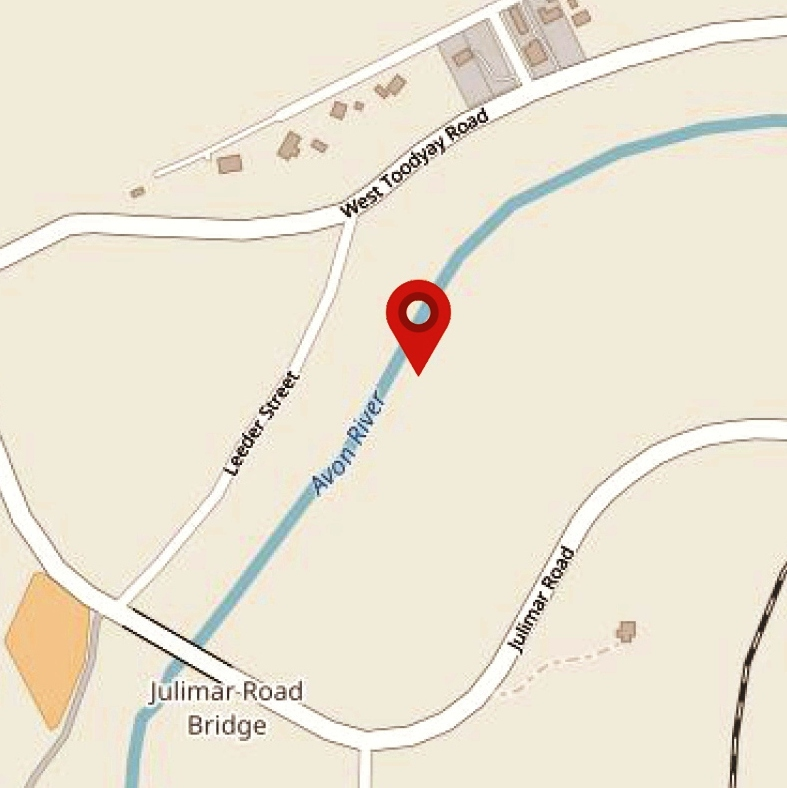
Military Barracks location on the high left bank of the Avon River, West Toodyay

The Toodyay Barracks (also referred to at various times as the Military Barracks, Police Station or Police Barracks) and its stables, erected in 1842, were the first buildings constructed in the townsite of Toodyay, Western Australia. The Barracks were also the first government buildings within the Toodyay district. Situated on the left bank of the Avon River and a little upstream from the ford, the Barracks overlooked a long pool, which soon became known as the Barracks Pool. In the early 1840s, Toodyay Resident Magistrate John Scully requested military protection to control a problem with the local indigenous people. Governor John Hutt agreed at the time to temporarily station a mounted native policeman to keep order.

The Toodyay Barracks were built by William Criddle, a local farmer, for 60 pounds. Completed in September 1842, they stood on what became lot L1. The main building measured 30 by 12 feet (9.1 by 3.7 m) and was built of rammed earth with a thatched roof. It contained two rooms with a central chimney and an earthen floor. Each room had a door and a shuttered window. Two beds, two tables, dishes, plates, pots, buckets, an axe, shovel and such were provided. The stables, built of wooden upright slabs with a thatched roof, measured 30 by 12 feet (9.1 by 3.7 m) and were considered adequate for the number of horses it would shelter. It also contained areas set aside for the storage of chaff and hay.

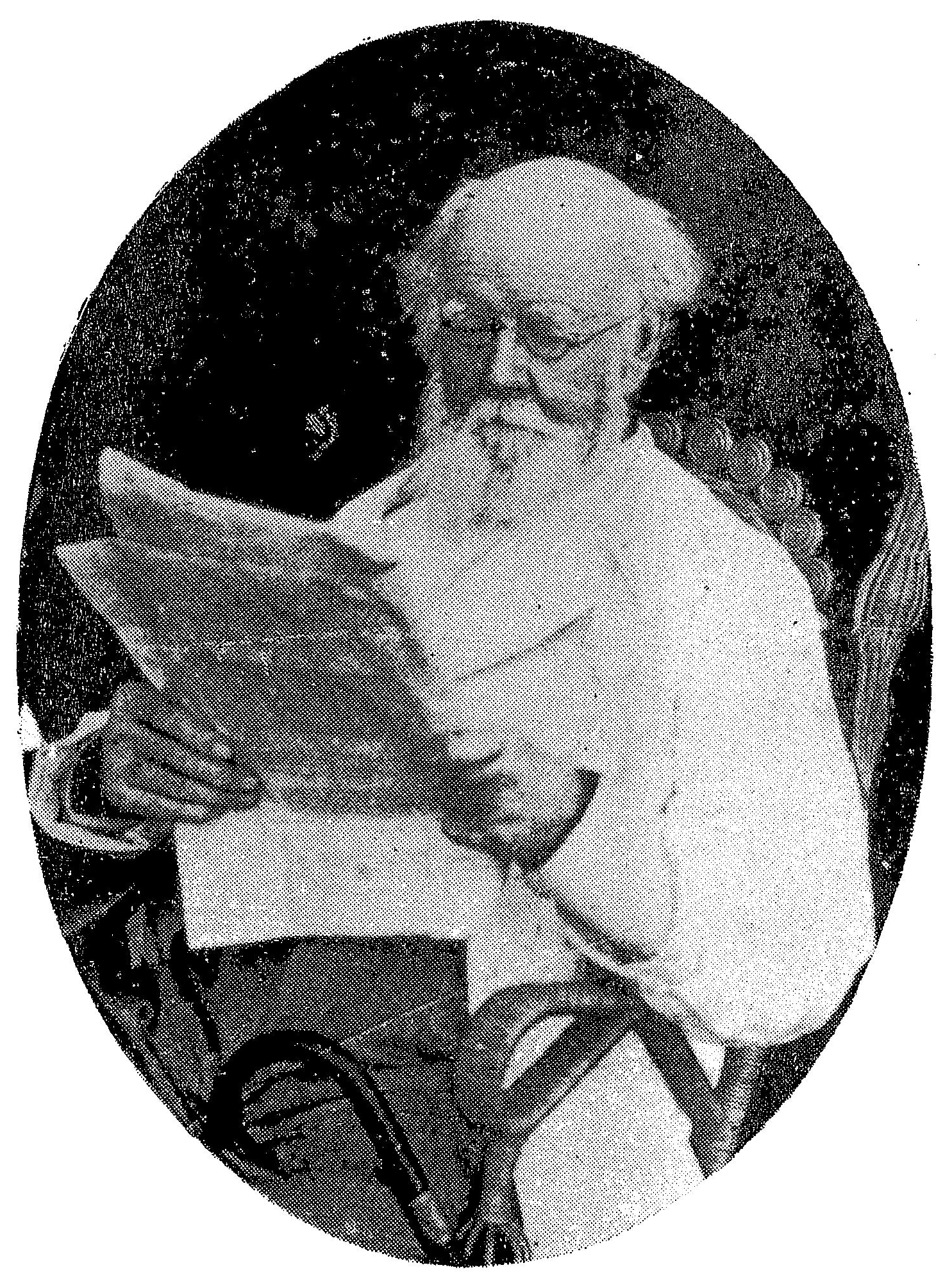
John Nicol Drummond

At times, the Toodyay Barracks were variously referred to as the Military Barracks or the Police Station because both a soldier and mounted native policeman were stationed there. The Barracks also served as a temporary lock-up. However, the lock-up proved inadequate, as Aboriginal prisoners were able to escape with ease. John Nicol Drummond, Inspector of Native Police, visited the area regularly.

During the 1840s, Edward Conlin erected a large hut type store on land between the Barracks and the ford. However, its presence is not officially recorded. In 1851, Charles Pye set up a store on what became lot L2, on the other side of the Barracks. The Barracks were first used as a post office in 1846 when operated by Mrs Pusey, the policeman's wife. Constable Pusey was a native police officer stationed at Toodyay under the supervision of Drummond. William Herbert took over the post office duties in 1848, followed by Michael Clarkson in 1849.

After the convicts had come to Toodyay, the Barracks were occupied by only a civil police constable and a mounted native policeman. Thereafter, the Barracks were referred to as the Police Station.

The Police Station at West Toodyay closed in 1859. On 30 March 1859, the Police Station was offered for sale or let, possession available on 21 June. The police were being transferred to a number of unused buildings within the Toodyay Convict Hiring Depot, situated approximately 3 miles (4.8 km) upstream. The sale of the original Police Station did not eventuate and the building saw no further use. Lot L1 remained as Crown land.

Ruins of the original building could be seen for many years.
