= Resident magistrate =

Person transplanted to a British colony as a local magistrate

A resident magistrate (sometimes abbreviated RM) was a suitably-qualified judicial officer appointed in British colonies, typically from outside the local community, who served as the principal authority in administering colonial justice, supervising other lay magistrates, and ensuring the consistent application of colonial law.

In colonial history, resident magistrates have had gubernatorial functions in a few minor, isolated colonial settlements, such as:

- Ascension, as dependency of Saint Helena; post filled by managers of Eastern Telegraph/Cable and Wireless since 1922 (previously under a commanding officer), replaced since June 1964 by an Administrator
- Walvisbaai, only two incumbents shortly after the 12 March 1878 annexation by Britain as Walvis Bay protectorate, first under a captain; annexation confirmed 14 December 1878:
  - 1 June 1878 – November 1880 D. Erskine
  - November 1880 – 7 August 1884 Benjamin Musgrave, staying on as Magistrate

Resident magistrates' courts remain in operation as one of the divisions of the judiciary of Jamaica, hearing civil and criminal cases in each parish of the island.

== In Australia ==
=== Western Australia ===
Governor James Stirling introduced the position of the Resident Magistrate or the government resident in the early 1830s as a means of assisting the Perth centre in the administration of the various and the small and distant settlements located throughout the Swan River Colony. Those appointed were usually prominent local farmers or businessmen as well as men who had some military background. As the representative of the Colonial Government, the Resident Magistrate was considered to be very powerful in the district and it was a position of certain status.

Although not a fulltime position the Resident Magistrates 'were expected to maintain law and order; register births, marriages and deaths; control and protect the Aboriginals; care for public buildings and works; and supervise all other government officers in the district, if there were any, or otherwise perform the work of all branches of government themselves as required'.

They acted as the Chairmen of the local Courts of Petty Sessions and Small Debts, and from 1863 were given the legal authority to determine court cases alone.

== Deputy magistrate ==
When the Caprivi Strip (formerly German Barotse- or Zambezi-land, in present Namibia) which had been administered by British Military Administrators since 21 September 1914 formally came under the administration of the British high commissioners for Southern Africa, the last Military Administrator stayed on as the first of only two Deputy magistrates, the highest British colonial official actually resident in the Strip:

- 1 January 1921 – c.1924 H. Neale
- 1940 – 1951 Lyall French Trollope
