= Jonathan Somers =

Australian Machinery manufacturer, former mayor of Toodyay

Jonathan Somers (1862-1928) was an Australian machinery manufacturer and mayor of Toodyay. He arrived in Toodyay as a blacksmith from Newcastle, New South Wales, and over time built up a major industry manufacturing vehicles and machinery using local timbers. Examples of his work won recognition at the 1899 Western Australian International Mining and Industrial Exhibition, also known as the Coolgardie Exhibition, and in 1900 he won first prize for a wagon at the Glasgow International Exhibition. His contribution to public life led to him becoming the Mayor of Newcastle in 1908. It was largely due to his influence as mayor that the town of Newcastle was renamed Toodyay in 1910.

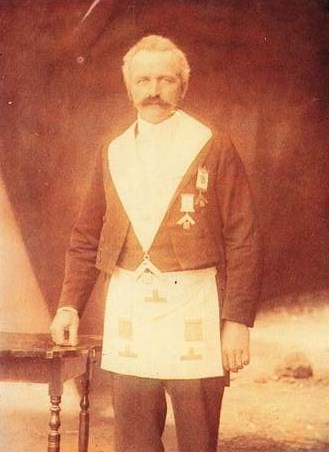
Somers in Masonic regalia

Somers was born on 23 August 1862 in Newcastle, New South Wales, to Daniel and Ann Somers (née Shehan). In 1890 he arrived in Newcastle, Western Australia (Note: Newcastle WA would be renamed Toodyay in 1910) to work as a blacksmith with the firm Kingston & Best located on Telegraph Road, North Newcastle. He soon bought out the firm and started to extend its operations. On 30 August 1891 Somers married Catherine Drummond Thomas (c.1870–1946), the daughter of William and Cecilia (née Drummond). Between c. 1892 and c. 1917 nine children were born, five sons (one died at birth) and four daughters.

From the latter half of the 1890s Somers was exhibiting machinery, wagons and vehicles at the annual Toodyay Agricultural Show. Of particular interest was the use of local timbers that drew this comment about the 1898 show:

Mr. Somers also had on view a most distinctive exhibit illustrative of the peculiar value of our hardwoods for wheelwright purposes- viz., an imported stripper wheel made of bluegum which had gone through nine years' wear and which was found to be in a very bad condition. The only parts of it at all sound were those where York gum had been filled in for repairs. A York gum wheel, with twenty years' work, was also on exhibition, and was much superior to the more recent one made from blue gum. The exhibit is one that the Forestry Department might well add to its collection.

According to Twentieth Century Impressions of W.A, (Note: This was an encyclopaedia produced in 1901 for presentation to the Duke and Duchess of Cornwall and York on their visit to Australia to open the new Parliament.) Toodyay counts among its assets valuable timbers – York and white gums and Morrell – and that the value of these timbers commercially is recognised is evidenced by the extensive demands for them made from all parts of the state. Somers' firm was catering to this demand. According to a description of the business:

The plant is very complete, and includes breaking-down benches, band and circular saws, spoke-turning machines, lathes, tennoning machines, planers and sand-belting machines…. Another branch of this business is the manufacture of every class of vehicle, from the dainty sulky to the cumbersome farm dray. Farming implements are also made on the premises, while experienced painters are busily engaged in the paint shop…. A powerful engine, made by Marshall and Sons, supplies the motive power for the machinery. … the average number of hands employed throughout the year being fourteen. (Note: Disaster struck in 1902 when his business was totally destroyed in a fire. Thomas Kingston, who apparently continued to operate in adjoining premises, also lost his workshop.)

Somers was an active member of the community and in 1908 he was prevailed upon to accept the role of mayor. Apparently the people of Toodyay were an apathetic bunch and when he held his first ratepayers meeting to discuss water rates only ten people turned up. There was a similar response when voting for the town's name to be changed. Despite hostility being added to the general apathy, it went ahead and the name of Toodyay was gazetted on 6 May 1910.

Somers was an energetic mayor. When the Oddfellows Hall was sold to W. Padbury in 1908 for a store, he realised there would be an urgent need for a hall large enough to hold public meetings. He lobbied successfully for a Town Hall (Toodyay Memorial Hall) to be added to the rear of the Municipal Chambers. His wife Catherine laid the foundation stone in August 1910. It was also largely due to Somers that the Toodyay War Memorial was erected following the Great War. He was also actively involved in Toodyay getting its new power plant that was installed in the former Connor's Mill in the main street. The Toodyay Power Station was officially opened in 1927 by the Minister for Public Works, Alexander McCallum.

Other roles held by Somers included first president of the Toodyay Literary and Debating Society when it was re-formed in 1910; president of the new branch of the Liberal League in 1911; chairman of the School Board when this was formed in 1918. He was also an active member of the Toodyay Agricultural Society, Race Club, Hospital and the Toodyay Club. He became a member of the Toodyay Road Board in 1920 and chairman in 1921. He held this position until his death on 5 January 1928 at his home "Kelvedon". His home still stands on Telegraph Road overlooking the showgrounds and site of the former factory and workshop. His son Ken Somers took over the business, which was named the Phoenix Coach and Waggon Works and Motor Garage.
