= Connor's House =

House in Toodyay, Western Australia

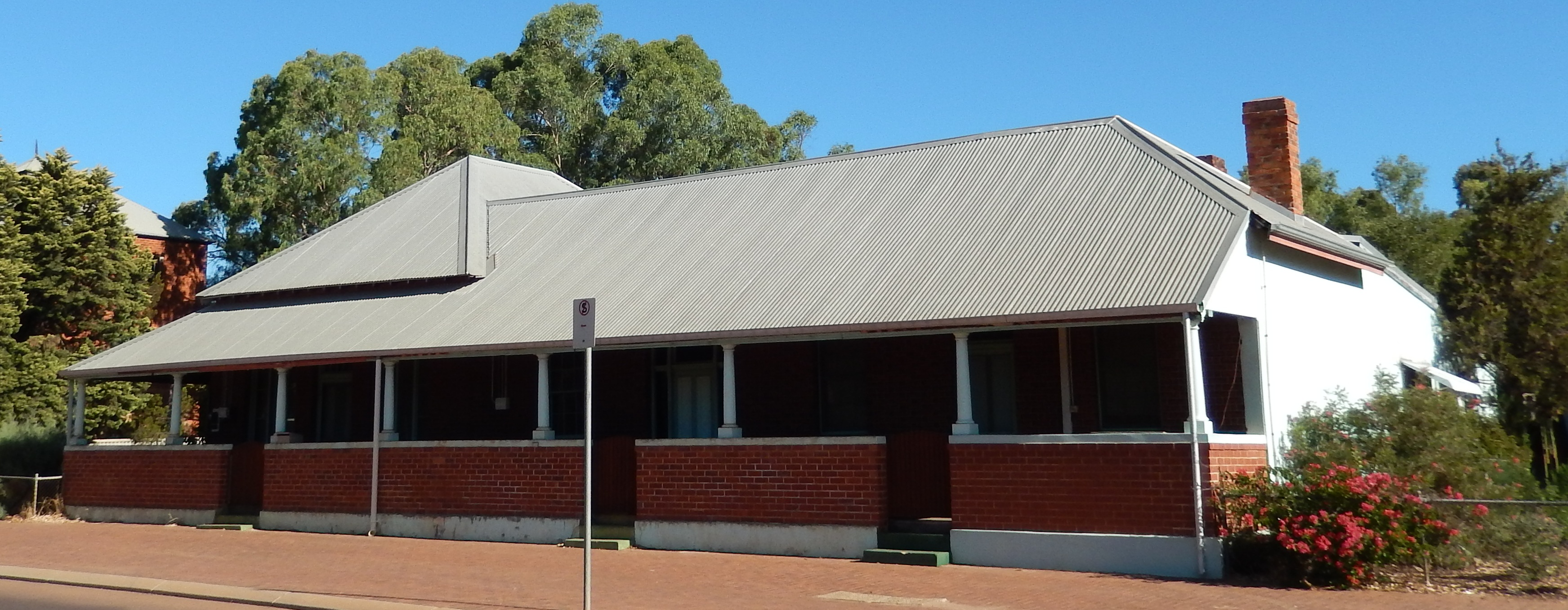

General information
- Architectural style: Victorian Georgian
- Location: 143 Stirling Terrace, Toodyay, Australia
- Coordinates: 31.5505°S 116.4648°E
- Completed: 1890

Design and construction
- Main contractor: George Hasell

References
- Toodyay municipal inventory

Connor's House is a single storey dwelling in Stirling Terrace, Toodyay, Western Australia. It was constructed circa 1890 for Daniel Connor.

The house was built for Daniel Connor and his wife Catherine. Connor arrived in the colony as a convict in 1853 and became one of Toodyay's most influential men. Its heritage record also links the house with local identity Eileen Syred. It is a long, single-storey range of common brick under a corrugated-iron roof, with the main roof sweeping down to form the verandah canopy. A hipped section at the south-western corner rises above the main roof, a low brick chimney stands at the south-eastern end, and the windows are timber-framed sashes.

The front is face brickwork, while the visible side wall is rendered. The Shire of Toodyay adopted it onto its Municipal Inventory in 1998 as a Category 3 place, recommending that it be retained and conserved if possible and photographed before any major redevelopment or demolition. It was added to the Shire's Heritage List in December 2012. The record rates its integrity as high, its authenticity as medium and its condition as good, and it was still a residence when last updated in 2021.

The building is heritage listed, and considered to have historical significance as a remaining example of Toodyay's development in the 1890s. It is also considered to have social significance as evidence of the way people lived in the late 19th century, and contributes to the aesthetics of Stirling Terrace, the main road in Toodyay.

A verandah extends across the full extent of the front of the building, with an enclosed bricked lower section replacing the original wooden balustrades in about 1960. There are three sections to the house, each with its own verandah access and front door. This house is the third building erected by Daniel Connor on this particular landholding (originally known as lot 9) which spans the corner of Stirling Terrace and Piesse Street. The other two buildings are Connor's Mill and Connor's Cottage.
