= Toodyay Historical Society =

Historical society in Toodyay, Western Australia

The Toodyay Historical Society started in Toodyay as the Toodyay Society in 1980 in conjunction with the Toodyay Tourist Centre. The first annual general meeting was held at the Country Women's Association hall on Stirling Terrace in April 1981.

The society had annual "Craft in Action" days, "Newcastle Balls", and was involved in the preservation of Donegans Cottage. In 1992 the Society became affiliated with the Royal Western Australian Historical Society.

In 1994 the Toodyay Society became the Toodyay Historical Society, and Rica Erickson became patron. (Note: Rika Erickson had written the history of Toodyay some 20 years before, as well as being a notable member of the Royal Western Australian Historical Society.)

As well as its own newsletter Duidgeeana, the society has also published a chronology of Toodyay, entitled The long Toodyay chronology: events in Toodyay's history, and a commemorative booklet on its own history.

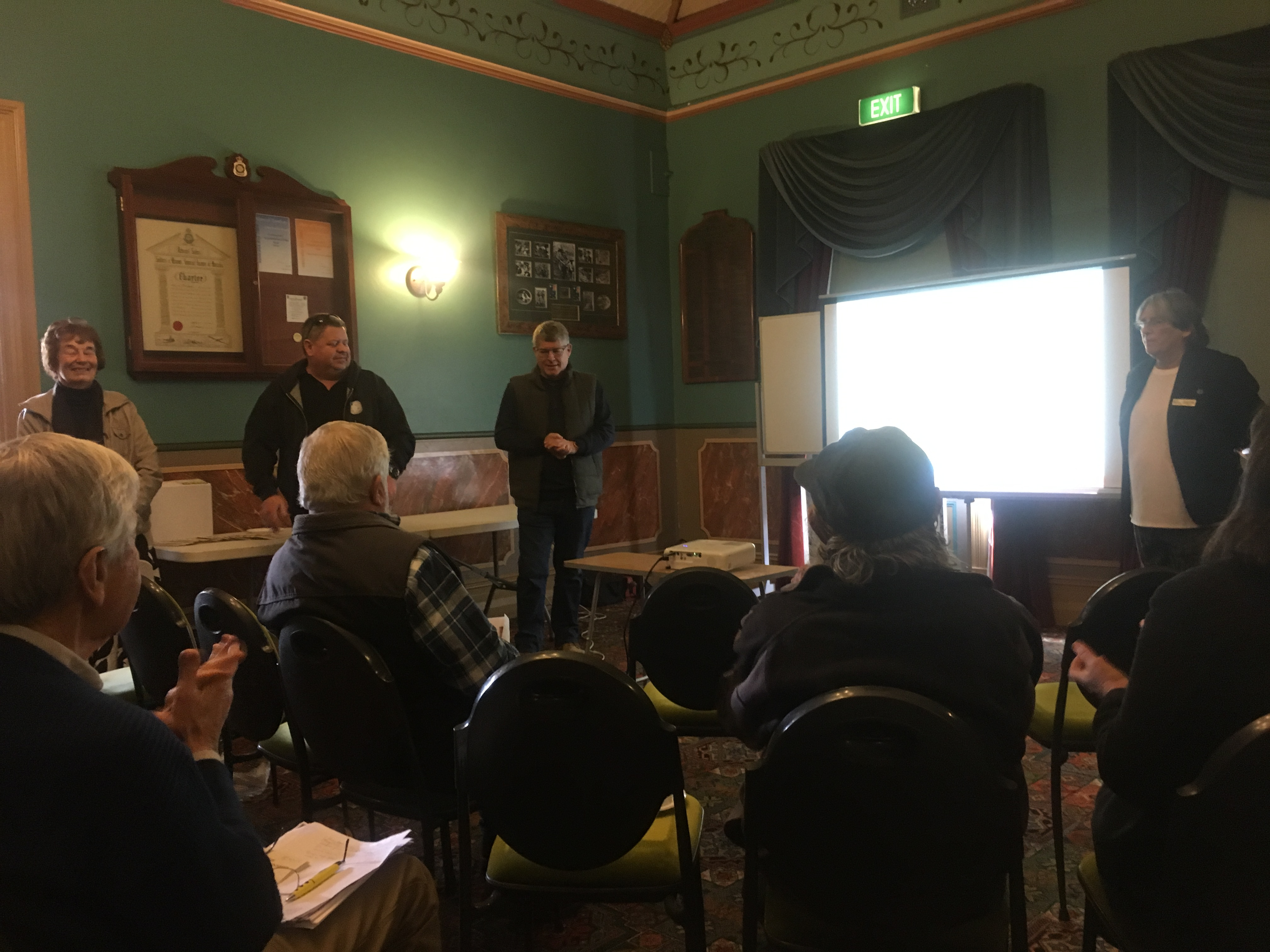
Public event celebrating Toodyaypedia stage 3 in the Toodyay Memorial Hall, June 2019

== Toodyaypedia ==
In the 2000s it became a collaborative partner in the Toodyaypedia Wikitown project, which started with discussions with the Shire of Toodyay and Wikimedia Australia. The first stage was in 2013; the third stage (focusing on West Toodyay) began in 2017, with the articles online by 2018.

A pamphlet based on the research for Toodyaypedia stage 3 was published and made available at a public event in Toodyay on 29 June 2019. It was titled The Township of West Toodyay - Early European Settlement of Toodyay within the Avon Valley of Western Australia, and produced by the Newcastle Gaol Museum, Shire of Toodyay. It was compiled by Alison Cromb, with reference to her publication The road to Toodyay.

== See also ==
- History Council of Western Australia
