= List of shire presidents of Toodyay =

The local government area now known as the Shire of Toodyay was originally established on 24 January 1871 as one of the initial road districts under the District Road Boards Act 1871, with a chairman and councillors. In 1877, the Municipality of Newcastle followed. The latter was abolished and merged back into the road district on 27 February 1912. With the passage of the Local Government Act 1960, all road districts became shires with a president and councillors effective 1 July 1961.

== History ==
From the establishment of a convict depot in Toodyay, construction and maintenance of roads along with other public works fell under the responsibility of Superintendent of Convicts. When convicts ceased being transported to Western Australia the convict depots closed, and in 1869 a Toodyay Road Committee was established. The committee was elected to enable continuation of works after the convict parties were withdrawn. The first chairman was James Drummond Jnr, other members elected were Samuel Phillips, Francis Whitfield Jnr, Charles Dempster, Frederick Roe, Lionel Lukin, John Monger Jnr, Abraham Morgan and Ewan Mackintosh. Arthur Edwardes Growse was elected to the committee in 1870, taking over as chairman; funding for the committee activities was through a government grant.

== Mayors of the Municipality of Newcastle ==
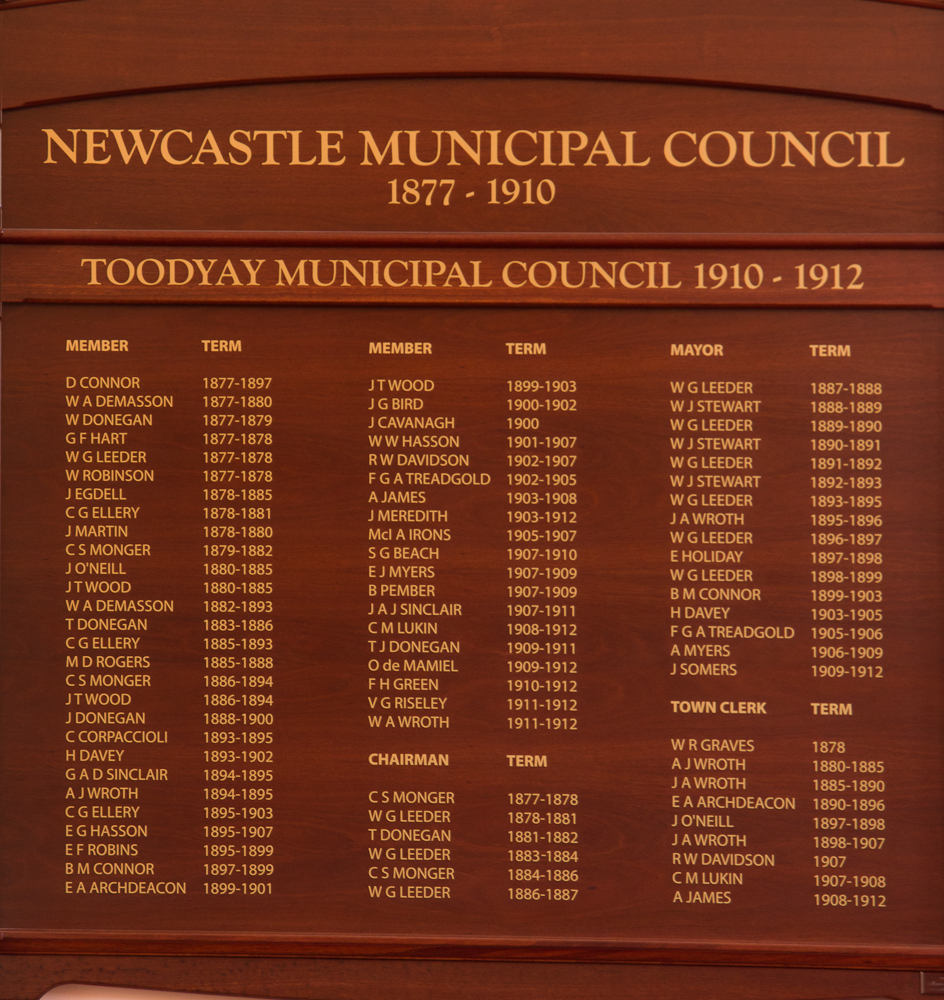
Newcastle municipal council honour board in the Shire Chambers

Mayor^{[1]}	Term
Charles Samuel Monger	1877–1878, 1884–1886^{[2]}
William George Leeder	1878–1881, 1882–1883,^{[2]} 1886–1888, 1889–1890, 1891–1892, 1893–1895, 1896–1897, 1898–1899
Thomas Donegan	1881–1882
William James Stewart	1888–1889, 1890–1891, 1892–1893
Joseph Ablett Wroth	1895–1896
Edward Holiday	1897–1898
Bernard Maurice Connor	1899–1903
Henry Davey	1903–1905
Frederick Treadgold	1905–1906
Abraham Myers	1906–1909
Jonathan Somers	1909–1912^{[3]}

^{1} Originally the position was Chairman until June 1887 when it was changed to Mayor.
^{2} Leeder's term concluded on 19 November 1883, but no election to replace him was held until 19 March 1884.
^{3} Name changed May 1910 along with the town to become the Toodyay Municipal council.

== Chairmen of the Toodyay Road Board ==
The first election was held at the Newcastle Court House on 15 February 1871 for seven members. The resident magistrate (W. J. Clifton) presided, and Arthur Edwardes Growse was elected as the district's first chairman. Most elections from 1872 until the beginning of the 20th century were held on the third Friday in December in accordance with section 9 of the District Roads Act 1871. Later acts changed this to the third Thursday in March (Roads Act 1902) and the second Saturday in April (Road Districts Act 1919). Until 1919, chairmen were directly elected by ratepayers; after this, they were elected at the first meeting following an election by a majority of councillors.

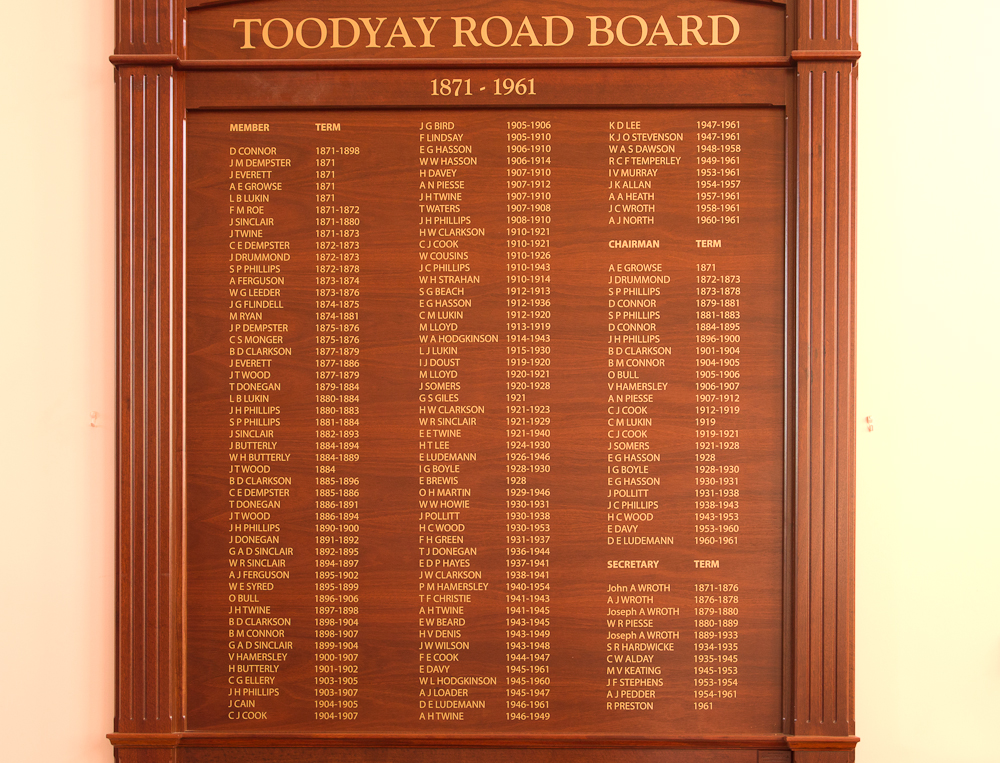
Toodyay Road Board honour board in the Shire of Toodyay Chambers

Chairman	Term
Arthur Edwardes Growse^{[1]}	1871–1872
James Drummond^{[2]}	1872–1873
Samuel Pole Phillips	1873–1878, 1880–1883
Daniel Connor	1878–1880; 1883–1895
John Hugh Phillips	1896–1900
Barnard Drummond Clarkson	1901–1904
Bernard Maurice O'Connor	1904–1905
Obadiah Bull	1905–1906
Vernon Hamersley	1906–1907
Alfred Napoleon Piesse	1907–1912
Charles James Cook	1912–1921
Jonathon Somers^{[3]}	1921–1928
Edmund Glover Hasson^{[3]}	1928, 1930–1931
Ignatius Boyle	1928–1930
James Pollitt^{[4]}	1931–1938
John Cunliffe Phillips^{[5]}	1938–1943
Horace Charles Wood^{[6]}	1943–1953
Edward Davy	1953–1960
Dallas Edward Ludemann	1960–1961

^{1} Growse formally resigned in April 1871, but continued in office as no replacement could be found before January 1872 election.
^{2} Drummond died in office on 8 February 1873. Phillips was elected chairman at a meeting on 27 February.
^{3} Somers died in office on 5 January 1928. Hasson completed the term of office, which concluded at 14 April 1928 election.
^{4} Pollitt resigned shortly before his death on 18 September 1938. Phillips (the son of John Hugh Phillips and the grandson of Samuel Pole Phillips) was elected chairman at a meeting on 17 September.
^{5} Phillips died in office on 18 May 1943, aged 58.
^{6} Wood was defeated in his West Ward seat at 18 April 1953 election.

== Presidents of the Shire of Toodyay ==
President	Term
Dallas Ludemann	1960–1969
Joseph Charles (Mac) Wroth	1969–1971
Ian Murray	1971–1982
Geoff Ludemann	1982–1988
Bob Somers	1988–1994
Geoff Ludemann	1994–1995
Leslie Hoft	1995–1996
Adrian Bolton	1997–2001
Allan Henshaw	2001–2005
Charlie Wroth	2005–2009
Chris Firns^{[1]}	2009–2010
Kevin Hogg	2010-2013
David Dow	2013–2017
Brian Rayner	2017–2019
Bill Manning	2019-2020
Rosemary Madacsi	2020-2023
Michael McKeown	2023-

^{1} Firns resigned as shire president on 11 August 2010. Hogg was elected by councillors at a meeting on 19 August.
