= Toodyay Memorial Hall =

Hall in Toodyay, Western Australia

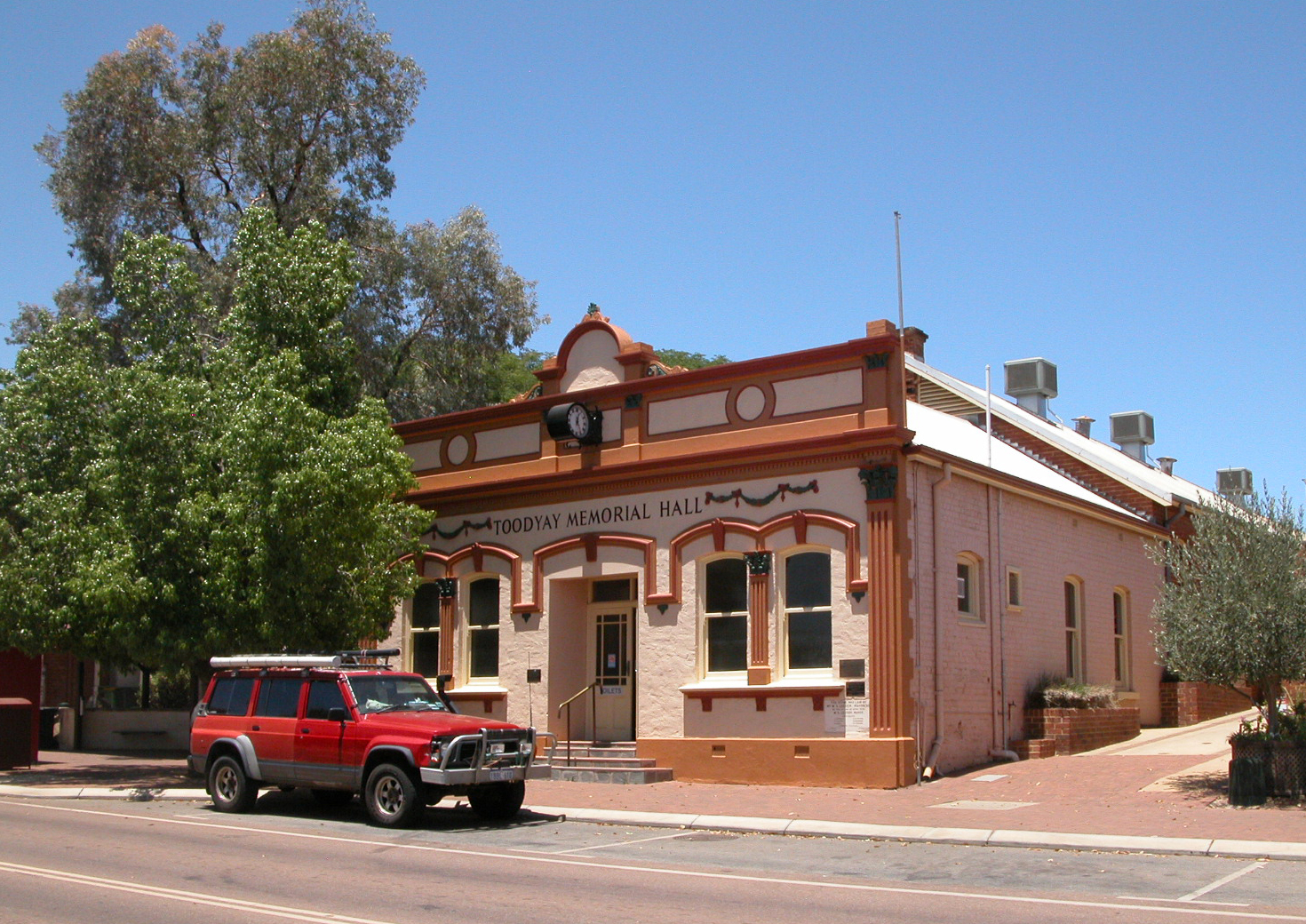
- Toodyay Memorial Hall
- Interactive map of the Toodyay Memorial Hall area
- Former names: Newcastle Municipal Chambers; Toodyay Town Hall

General information
- Location: 117 Stirling Terrace, Toodyay, Australia
- Coordinates: 31.5501°S 116.4669°E
- Construction started: Chambers: 1899; Hall: 1910
- Owner: Shire of Toodyay

Height
- Architectural: Victorian Institutional

Design and construction
- Architect: Charles H. Whiteford,
- Main contractor: A. Stewart & Co., York; W. Clarke, Guildford

Renovating team
- Architect: Patrick Urwin

Other information
- Seating capacity: 200

Website
- www.toodyay.wa.gov.au/facilities.aspx

The Toodyay Memorial Hall is a heritage-listed building on Stirling Terrace in Toodyay, Western Australia. It was originally built in 1899 as the Newcastle Municipal Chambers, then substantially extended in 1910, with further extensions in 1956–57 and 1990–92.

The building includes two halls: the 60 m^{2} (650 sq ft) "Lesser Hall" or "Foyer" (the original 1899 building), and a larger 250 m^{2} (2,700 sq ft) auditorium with a stage.

== History ==
The Municipality of Newcastle was established in 1877, and based in the town then known as Newcastle (now Toodyay); council meetings were held in the Mechanics' Institute building. However, by 1894, councils meetings were being held at hotels – as were the meetings of the Toodyay Road Board – due to limited availability of the Mechanics' Institute building, and the public were complaining that they did not have access to the meetings. After two requests to Premier John Forrest, in 1894 and 1895, the government agreed to fund municipal chambers. By 1899, Charles Henry Whiteford had designed the building, and the foundation stone was laid by Hannah Emily Leeder, (Note: The foundation stones, plaques and most references refer to Mayoress Mrs WG Leeder and Mayoress Mrs J Somers. This was consistent with the normal convention at the time of referring to a married woman as Mrs followed by her husband's first name (or initials) and surname, rather than her own first name. "Mayoress" is an honorary title for the wife of the Mayor.) the wife of the Mayor William George Leeder, on 12 April 1899. Forrest opened the building on 18 October 1899. The Newcastle Municipal Council held its first meeting in the new building on 4 December 1899. The Toodyay Road Board also held their monthly meetings in the hall from 1900, on separate days to the Council, until they merged in 1912.

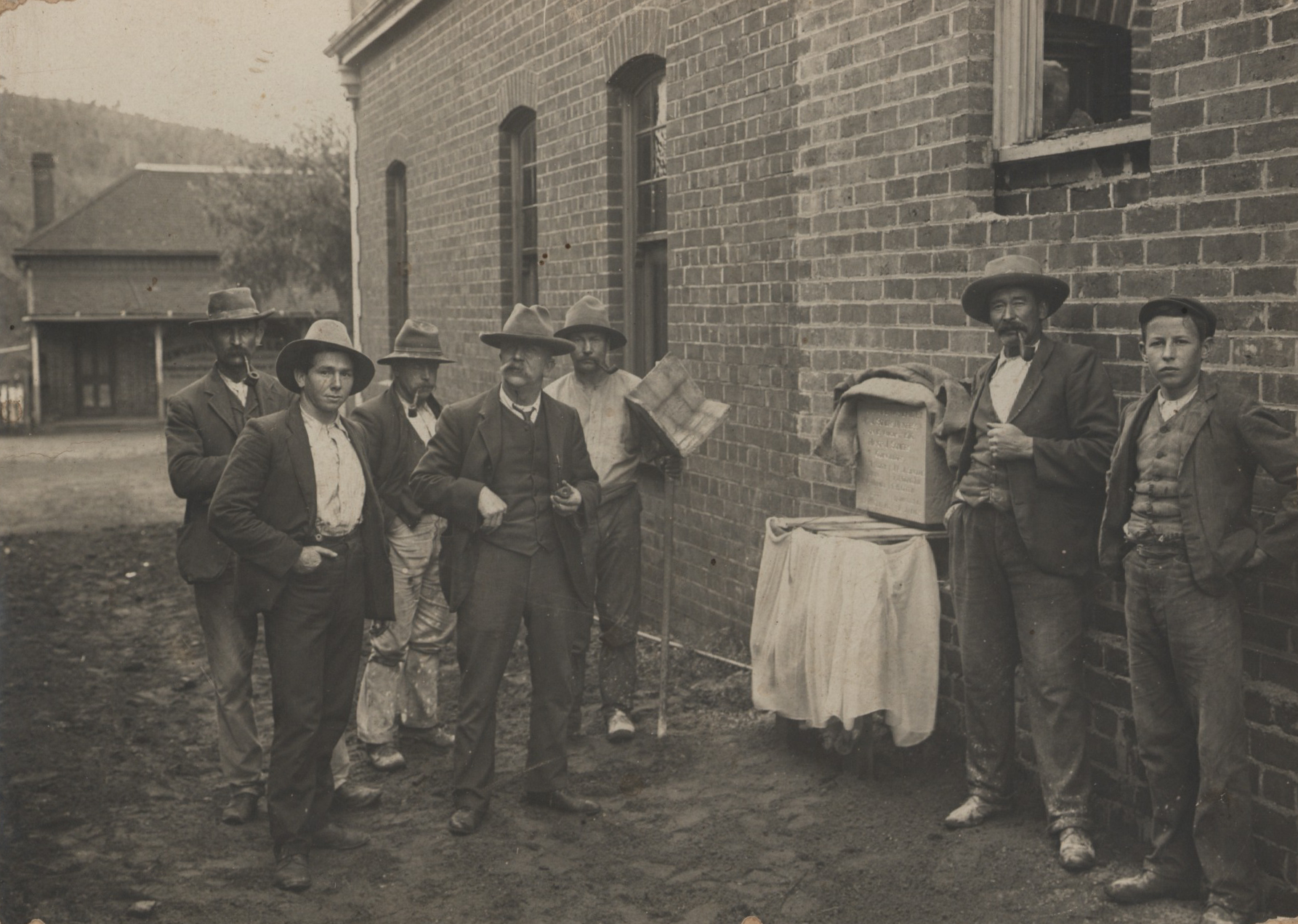
Laying the foundation stone of the Toodyay Town Hall 1910

Up until 1908 the town's Oddfellows Hall had provided a venue for larger entertainment events. When it was converted into stores, a need became apparent for a town hall, and one was proposed in 1909. The town hall was built adjoining the existing municipal chambers with a contract price of £850. The foundation stone was laid in August 1910 by Catherine Somers, wife of Mayor Jonathan Somers, and the hall was officially opened on 7 October 1910 with a charity ball to raise funds for the local hospital.

The town had officially changed its name from Newcastle to Toodyay in May 1910, so the new hall was known as the Toodyay Town Hall. It was renamed as the Toodyay Memorial Hall in 1957.

The Municipality of Toodyay merged with the Toodyay Road District in 1912, and the front section of the building was renamed from the Newcastle Municipal Chambers to the Toodyay Road Board Chambers.

Electric lighting was installed in 1920, and electric fans in the main hall in 1928.

In 1956–57 the auditorium was extended, a new stage was built, and an additional room added on to the back. This work was partly funded by the Toodyay RSL, a condition of which was the renaming to the Toodyay Memorial Hall.

The auditorium was regularly used as a picture theatre up until the 1960s.

The dual-faced clock on the front of the building, a locally made replica of a railway clock, was added in 1988 as part of the Australian Bicentenary celebrations.

In 1990–92 major renovations were carried out to the entire building, including addition of a new kitchen and bar. During these renovations the hall's foundation stone was removed and stored in the Newcastle Gaol Museum. It was subsequently re-installed in 2010 near its original position.

In the 2000s digital projection equipment and a retractable screen were installed.
