= Coondle, Western Australia =

Locality in Western Australia

Coordinates: 31°29′S 116°26′E

Coondle is a small acre farming estate in the Shire of Toodyay in Western Australia. It started as an estate developed under the provisions of the Agricultural Lands Purchase Act (1896) near what was then known as Newcastle (now Toodyay).

The estate was one of the first established under the provisions of the Agricultural Lands Purchase Act; originally Coondle was an immigrant grant where, to encourage development of the Swan River Colony, people were granted land based on the value of their investment in the colony.

== History ==
In late May and early June 1836 George Leake, George Moore, and Richard Brown explored the Toodyay and Bolgart areas looking for land for Leake. The first title, identified as Avon Location 1, was issued to George Leake in 1836; Leake named the property Coondle. Upon his death in 1849 the property passed to his nephew George Walpole Leake, who died in 1895. There is no record of the Leake family residing on the property; it was leased by a number of prominent locals including Charles Ferguson, who would later purchase one of the allotments, James Drummond Jnr, and the Dempster family .

In November 1897 the people of Newcastle expressed support for the Land Purchase Board acquiring the Coondle Estate for the Government, as rumours of new gold finds on land in the area had seen several parcels of land sold at considerably increased prices. The land – 7800 acres in total – was purchased from the Leake Estate for £7015 9s 8d.

In 1898 Coondle was surveyed for the Crown Lands Department by Leeming, Crowther and Rutherford; the lots were identified as Avon Locations 1 and 15. Avon Location 1, released in April 1898, covered about 7000 acres of land and was subdivided into blocks ranging from 20 to 567 acres. The cost of the land varied from 10s to £5 dependent upon its suitability for the various farming activities already occurring in the region.

The estate was served by the existing Newcastle-Bejoording road through the centre, providing access to Newcastle and the goods sheds for the railway. An old track to Chittering was upgraded to a permanent road (now Julimar Road) to provide access to the western side, and a road along Church Gully (now Church Gully Road) provided access to the eastern side.

Toodyay Brook, a tributary of the Avon River, provided a permanent water supply, although it was brackish during summer. A well provided fresh water, and previous experience with several soaks suggested that more wells could be successfully sunk.

Avon Location 15, comprising 800 acres adjoining the old Newcastle town site was partly cleared but not subdivided.

The sale of Avon Location 1, Coondle Estate was considered an experiment as to the success of the Agricultural Lands Purchase Act, and was being watched carefully as to what impact it could have on future land policies of the Western Australian Government. The land was officially released on 13 April 1898, and by 30 April 1898 it was being reported that over half of the estate had been sold.

An audit of the Coondle development in 1905 showed that all of the land had been sold and – with the exception of one 100-acre allotment – improved. These improvements included dwellings, wells, 66 miles of fencing, and 1800 acres under cultivation. One farmer had 8 acres of orchids, 20 acres under cultivation, along with 200 bee hives, from which he held approximately 13 tons of honey in storage.
