= Dr Growse's House =

House in Toodyay, Western Australia

Coordinates: 31.554943°S 116.475149°E

Dr Growse's house (fmr)
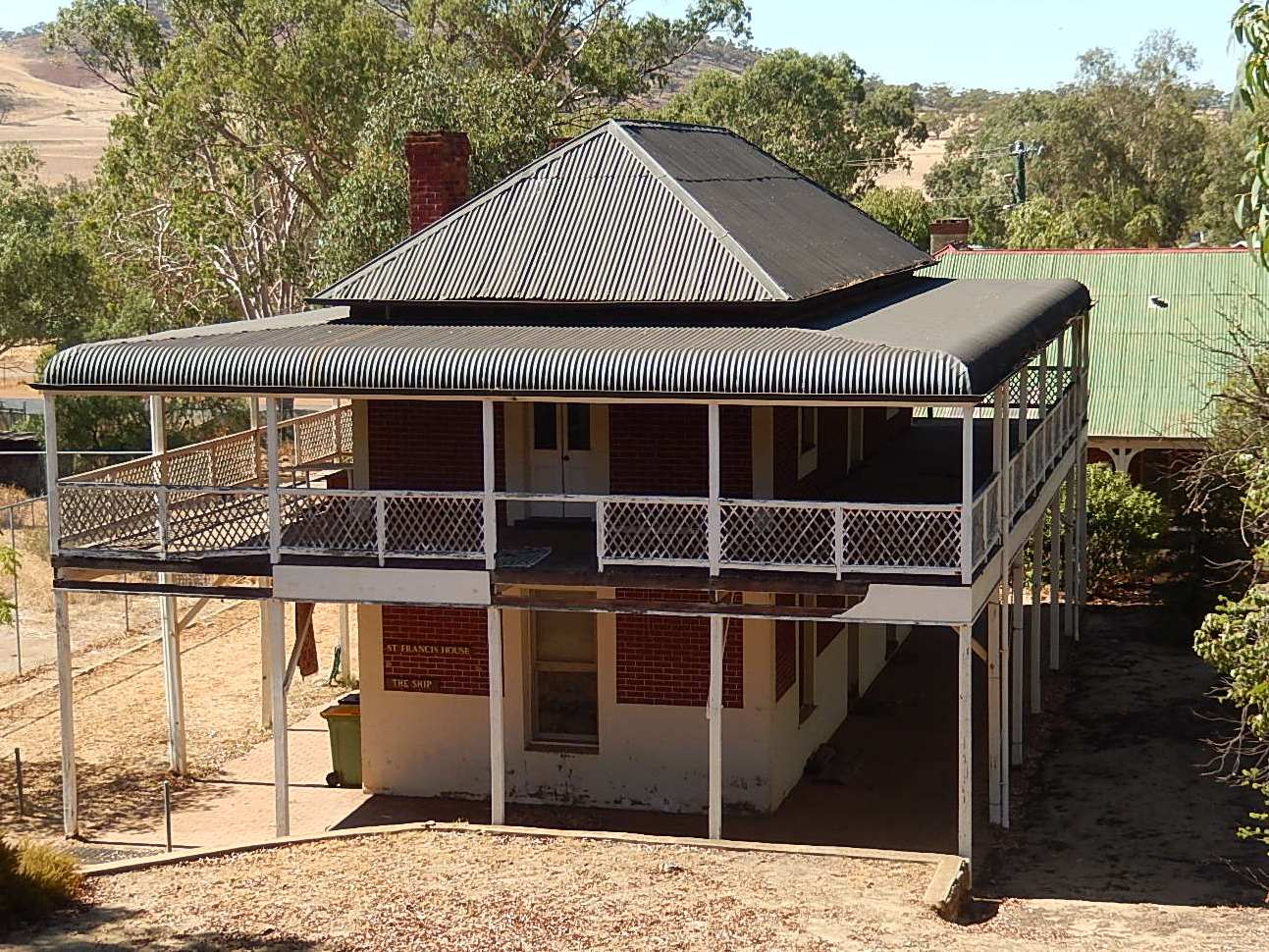
- Dr Growse's house, from the west
- Interactive map of the Dr Growse's house (fmr) area
- Alternative names: The Ship

General information
- Architectural style: Victorian Georgian
- Location: 34–38 Stirling Terrace, Toodyay, Australia
- Completed: Early 1860s
- Renovated: 1884, 1902

Design and construction
- Main contractor: Joseph Wroth (1884)

References
- Toodyay municipal inventory

Dr Growse's House is located on Stirling Terrace in Toodyay, Western Australia and was constructed in the early 1860s, possibly with convict labour.

Arthur Edwardes Growse was the medical officer at Toodyay from 1856 to 1872 and again from 1876 until his death in 1877. In 1884 William Mayhew moved into the house, and renovated and added the downstairs verandah. In 1902 the Sisters of Mercy purchased the house, having built a convent school on adjacent land. The infant school and music room were located in the building.

The building, also known as the Ship, has been extended and adapted as requirements have changed. It is a two-storey brick and render structure. It has an enclosed verandah on the first floor with timber lattice panels. It has a corrugated iron roof with a bullnose verandah roof, and timber framed sash windows.
