= Toodyay Public Library =

Public library in Toodyay, Western Australia

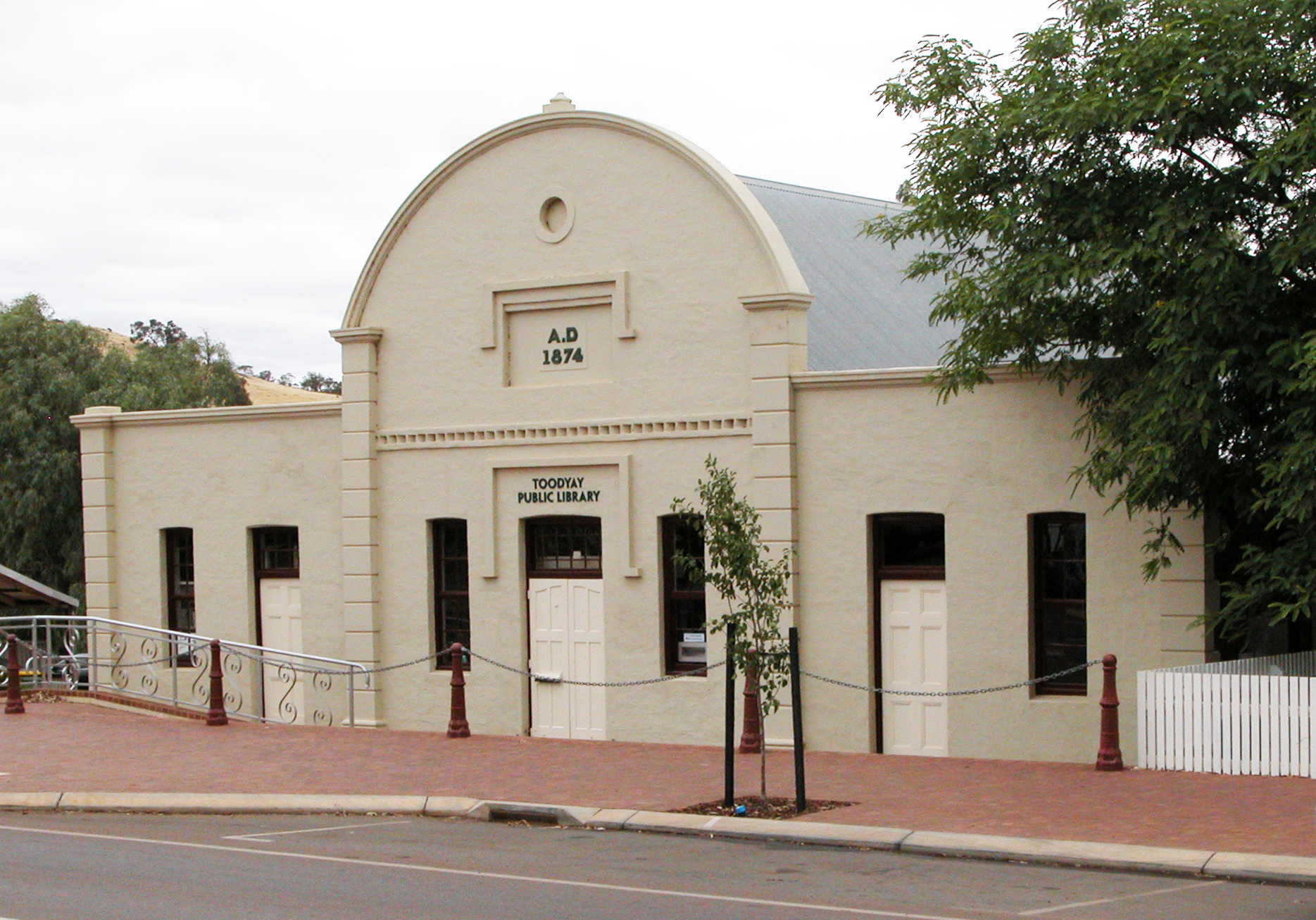
- Interactive map of the Toodyay Public Library area
- Former names: Mechanics' Institute, Newcastle Roads Board, Toodyay Roads Board

General information
- Architectural style: Victorian Free Classical / Eclectic
- Location: 96 Stirling Terrace, Toodyay
- Coordinates: 31.5503°S 116.4696°E
- Completed: 1874

Design and construction
- Main contractor: Thomas Davey assisted by George Hasell

Western Australia Heritage Register
- Type: State Registered Place
- Designated: 21 January 1997
- Reference no.: 2566

References
- Toodyay municipal inventory

Toodyay Public Library is located on Stirling Terrace in Toodyay, Western Australia.

== Early stages ==
One of the forerunners to the library was the Newcastle Mechanics' Institute, which formed in 1866. Charles Harper was elected president. By 1869, however, the Institute had begun to decline from lack of public support.

The Toodyay Young Men's Reading Club was founded on 30 August 1871 and operated from the government schoolroom into the early 1870s. This club presented lectures; its first lecture was given by Rev. J. M. Innes on Charles Dickens, and another was given Rev. Charles Harper – father of Charles Harper, pastoralist, newspaper proprietor and politician in colonial Western Australia – on "Phenomena connected with Sound".

On 3 September 1873 a "tea-meeting" (replete with singing and comestibles) was held to discuss the merging of the Mechanics' Institute and the Toodyay Young Men's Reading Club, with a view to the construction of a new building for the resultant organisation.

== Library building ==
=== Mechanics' Institute 1874-1921 ===
Mr Leeder of Leeder's Hotel agreed to construct the building on generous terms. The debt to finance the construction was repaid in 20 years. Thomas Davey's tender of £235 10s, equivalent to A$36,266.33 in 2022, was accepted by the building committee on 7 February 1874, with work to be completed within four months. The finished building became the home of the revived Newcastle Mechanics' Institute and was one of the first civic buildings constructed in the new townsite of Toodyay.

On 19 November 1877 the first Newcastle Municipal Council was elected and meetings were held in the Newcastle Mechanics Institute hall. By 1886 the Council was paying an annual rent of £1 for the use of the hall.

The stage, and the fireplace on the western side of the building, were added in 1886. In that year a new piano, costing about £90, equivalent to A$13,464 in 2022, was purchased from Messrs. Brinsmead & Company of Perth and £12 worth of books were added to the library. An annual subscription fee of 12 shillings, about A$89.76 in 2022, for membership of the Mechanics Institute partially funded the purchase of newspapers and books, heating, stationery and the wages of the secretary and librarian. Concerts and other fundraising events, the hiring of the hall and a government grant supplemented the Institute's income. In 1886 there were 33 members. Mrs Martin took over as caretaker and librarian from Mrs C. Betts, who had resigned the previous year.

Throughout the late 1880s and early 1890s the hall was used for a variety of public gatherings. On 25 October 1890 a free ball celebrating Proclamation Day was hosted at the Mechanics' Institute; 150 people attended. On 12 December 1892 a magic lantern entertainment and lecture on the life and work of John Wesley, by the Rev. H.C. George of York, took place at the hall. On 2 January 1893 a resolution was made by the Newcastle Municipal Council that in future their meetings be held at one of the three hotels, instead of at the Mechanics' Hall, as the Council were sometimes inconvenienced by the letting of the hall for entertainments.

In 1894 the hall was renovated inside and out as it had become "most dilapidated". During the years 1895 and 1896 there was a push by the local community for state government assistance in enlarging the mainly privately funded Mechanics' Institute building, with a view to providing an appropriate site for Municipal Council Chambers. In 1897, however, the state government announced it was funding the erection of a separate building for this purpose. (Note: That building is now known as the Toodyay Memorial Hall.)

In 1897 the Newcastle Municipal Council had resumed meeting at the Mechanics' Institute. In May of that year the Mechanics' Institute Committee made additions to the building. These are assumed to be the two side wings, and possibly also the current curved facade. In July another new hall was opened in the main street, constructed by the local lodge of the Order of Oddfellows. (Note: This building remains today on Stirling Terrace, with the name Jager Stores on its parapet.)

In December 1897 the Newcastle Municipal Council received notification from the secretary of the Mechanics' Institute that rental of their hall had increased from £1, about A$172.27 in 2022, per annum to £5. After investigation the Council found the Oddfellows hall could be hired for £3 10s per annum and 5s extra for elections. The Oddfellows offer was accepted. The following month, however, the Mechanics Institute reduced its fee to match that of the Oddfellows and the Council continued to meet there until their inaugural meeting in the new building on 4 December 1899.

In 1898 the Newcastle Mechanics' Institute was allocated a State Government grant of £100, of which £67 10s was spent by the end of 1903. On 30 May 1899 women's suffrage was debated at the Newcastle debating society meeting in the Mechanics’ Institute. It was reported that women were present.

On 28 January 1905 the inaugural meeting of the Toodyay Club was held in the Newcastle Mechanics’ Institute. Dr Arthur William Crawford chaired the meeting and is considered the founder of the club. The first president was Bernard Maurice Connor; secretary and treasurer was Charles Maxwell Lukin. The subscription was set at 2 guineas, about A$354 in 2022, per annum, and 112 people became members. Their purpose-built clubrooms, constructed in 1908 in the main street, is now known as Stirling House.

By 1906 a loss of subscribers to the Institute combined with reduced government support saw the building fall into disrepair again. No new books had been purchased for some time and a paid secretary had been dispensed with. In 1907 the Newcastle Mechanics’ Institute was revived when a government concession enabled the purchase of new books for the library and Jane Hasell, aged 32 years, was appointed caretaker and librarian. The Institute received four cases of books that year, including novels and reference works, from the travelling libraries branch of the Public Library of Western Australia. Membership rose to over 100.

In 1909 most of the income to the Mechanics' Institute was from subscriptions, rent of the hall, rent of chairs, sale of papers and kerosene tins, government subsidy and rental of a room to the Australian Light Horse. Expenditures mainly comprised the caretaker's salary, repair of the piano, consumables such as wood, kerosene, water and sanitary services, the purchase of periodicals and newspapers, and the repair of the door. On 24 February 1910 Sir John Forrest (then Federal Treasurer) visited Newcastle as part of his election campaign and addressed a meeting at the Institute. On 12 September 1910 journalist and social reformer Jessie Ackermann, representing the Australian Women's National League in Western Australia, visited the Institute and addressed a large audience of women reminding them of their political responsibilities and encouraging them to vote at elections.

However, by 1916 expenses for running the Institute were exceeding revenue being raised. The withdrawal of government support again in 1913 saw the reduction of up-to-date literature and therefore public patronage. In 1919 members of the community, led by John Masterson, once again attempted to rally support for the Institute through membership drives and fundraising events to pay off debts and provide better amenities. After Masterson's death in 1920 community interest in the Mechanic's Institute and library waned. At a public meeting on 21 November 1921 it was proposed that the Institute be closed and its assets sold, with funds – after the discharge of outstanding liabilities – going towards the local hospital.

=== Community Hall 1921-1927 ===
The Institute's furniture and books were duly sold, but there was uncertainty about who actually owned the building, as the original Trustees were all dead.

In the meantime the building continued to be used for a variety of purposes such as fundraising bazaars for St John the Baptist Church in 1922, 1923, 1925 and 1926. In August 1924 the Toodyay Football Association hosted a "smoke social" in the hall, where they entertained a visiting football team from the firm of Harris Scarfe-Sandovers. In 1925 the Toodyay Girls Gymnasium Club met at the hall, and a room was set aside for storage of the training equipment for the machine gun sub-section of the Vickers machine gun troop of the Toodyay 10th Light Horse Regiment.

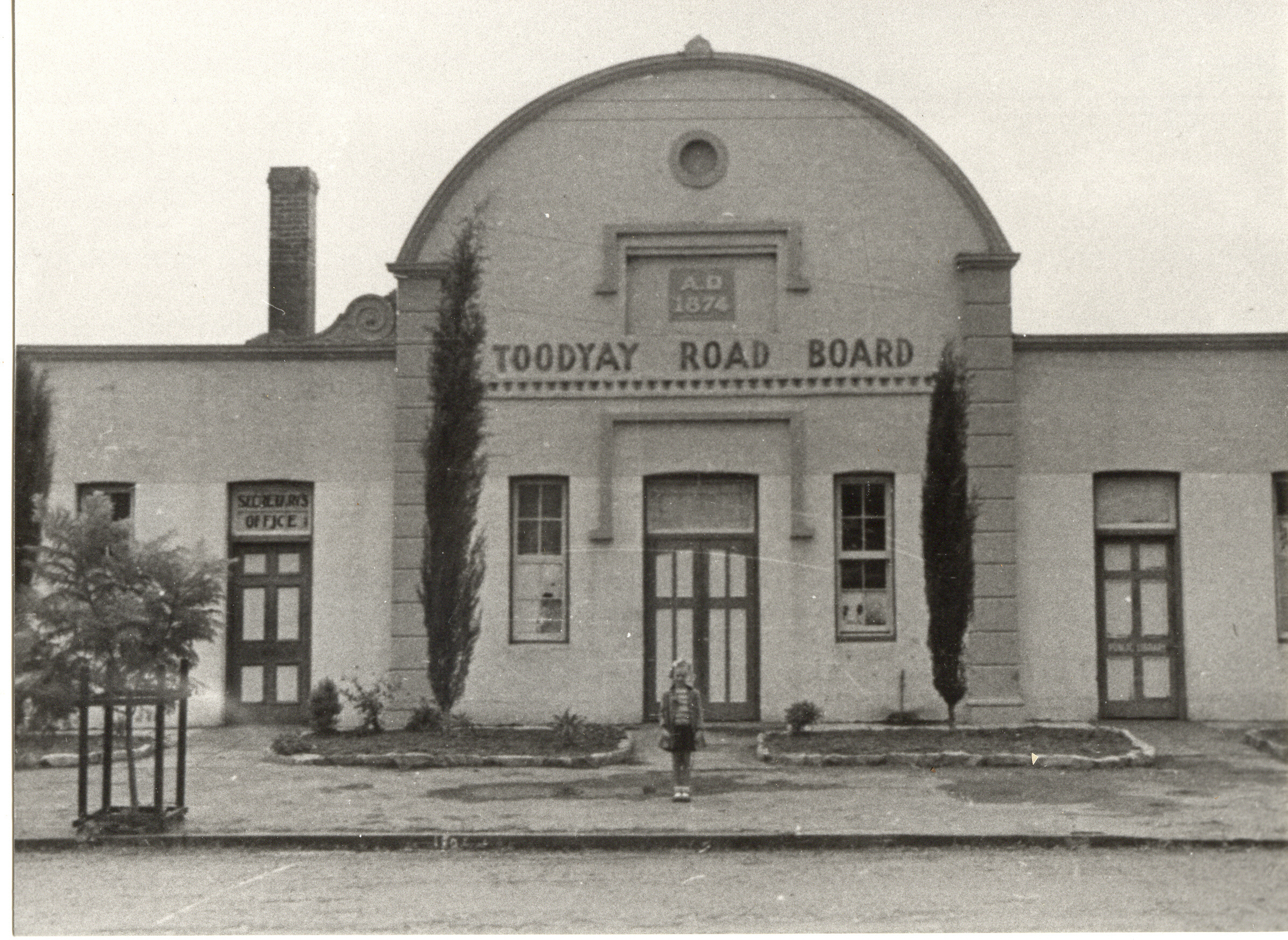
Toodyay Road Board offices early 1950s

In July 1926 ownership of the building and land reverted to the Crown and subsequently to the Toodyay Road Board. In November 1926 the Water Supply Department requested from the Board payment of arrears due on the Mechanics' Institute account amounting to £3/12/-.

=== Toodyay Road Board 1927-1958 ===
In 1926, the former mechanics institute building on Stirling Terrace was vested in the Toodyay Road Board. The following year it was renovated and became the new Toodyay Road Board offices. In 1947, the Toodyay Public Library commenced in the southern room of the building. In March 1959, the Road Board Offices moved to the restored courthouse allowing the Toodyay Public Library to further expand into the space vacated by the Road Board.

=== Toodyay Public Library 1959-onwards ===
In 1959 the building was renamed to the Toodyay Public Library.

The building is currently registered on the Australian Heritage Database.
