= Toodyay Club =

Club in Toodyay, Western Australia

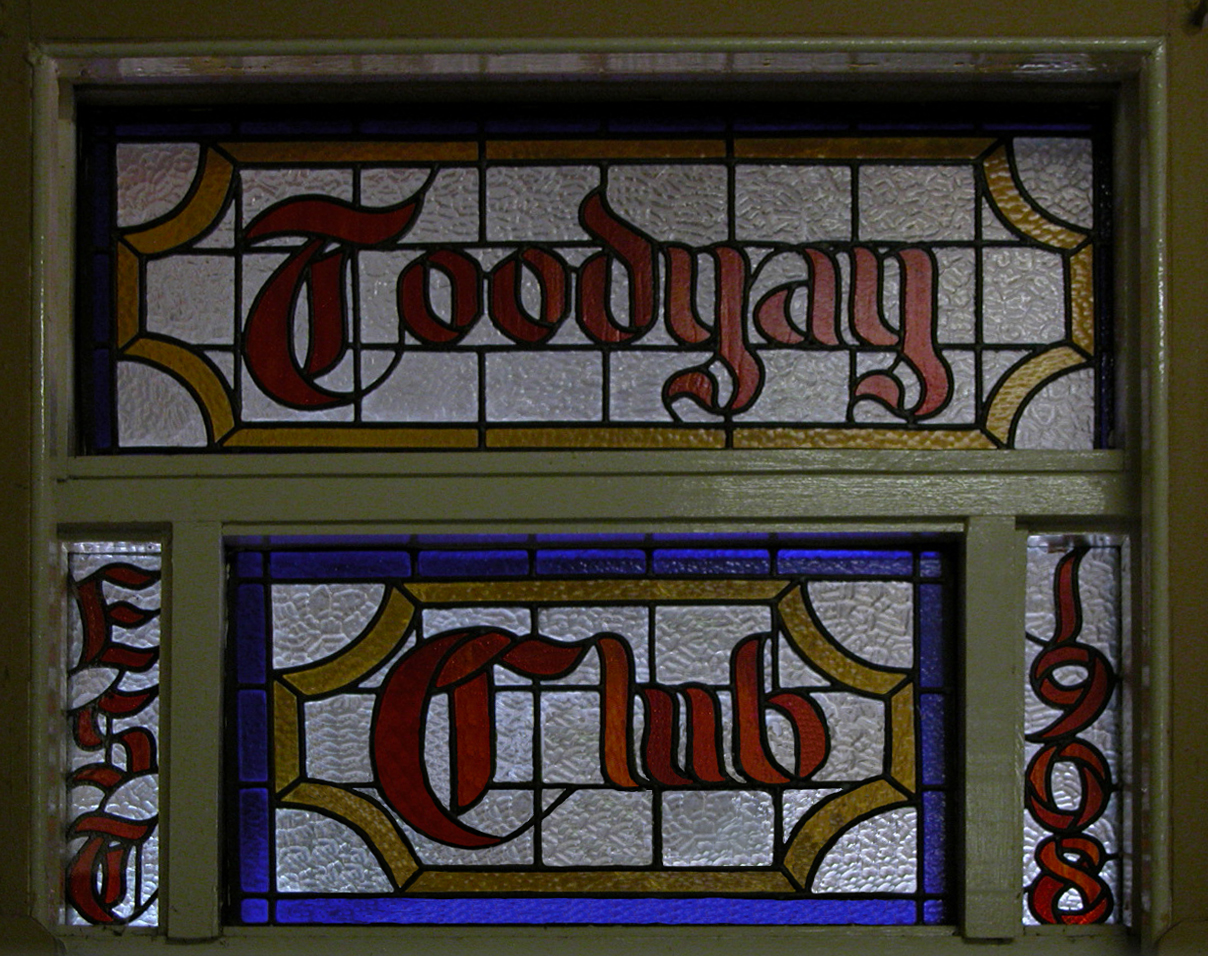
"Toodyay Club" in stained glass at the entrance to Stirling House

Toodyay Club was the name used for the gentlemen's club in Stirling House on Stirling Terrace in Toodyay, Western Australia that operated, between 1908 and 1975.

The same club name was also used in 1905 for what was described as a social club.

== Similar named organisations ==
However, the name also applied to a range of other organisations, where the sport or hobby was often omitted in newspaper story headlines and abbreviated to Toodyay Club:

- Toodyay Amateur Swimming Club
- Toodyay Cricket Club
- Toodyay Cycle Club
- Toodyay Garden Club
- Toodyay Golf Club
- Toodyay Historical Society 1980 (as Toodyay Society), started in 1994.
- Toodyay Hockey Club – in reality the West Toodyay Hockey Team
- Toodyay Naturalists Club
- Toodyay Race Club
- Toodyay Rifle Club
- Toodyay Sports Club
- Toodyay Swimming Club
- Toodyay Veterans Cricket Club
- Toodyay Whippet Club
- Toodyay Young Men's Reading Club
