= Connor's Cottage =

House in Toodyay, Western Australia

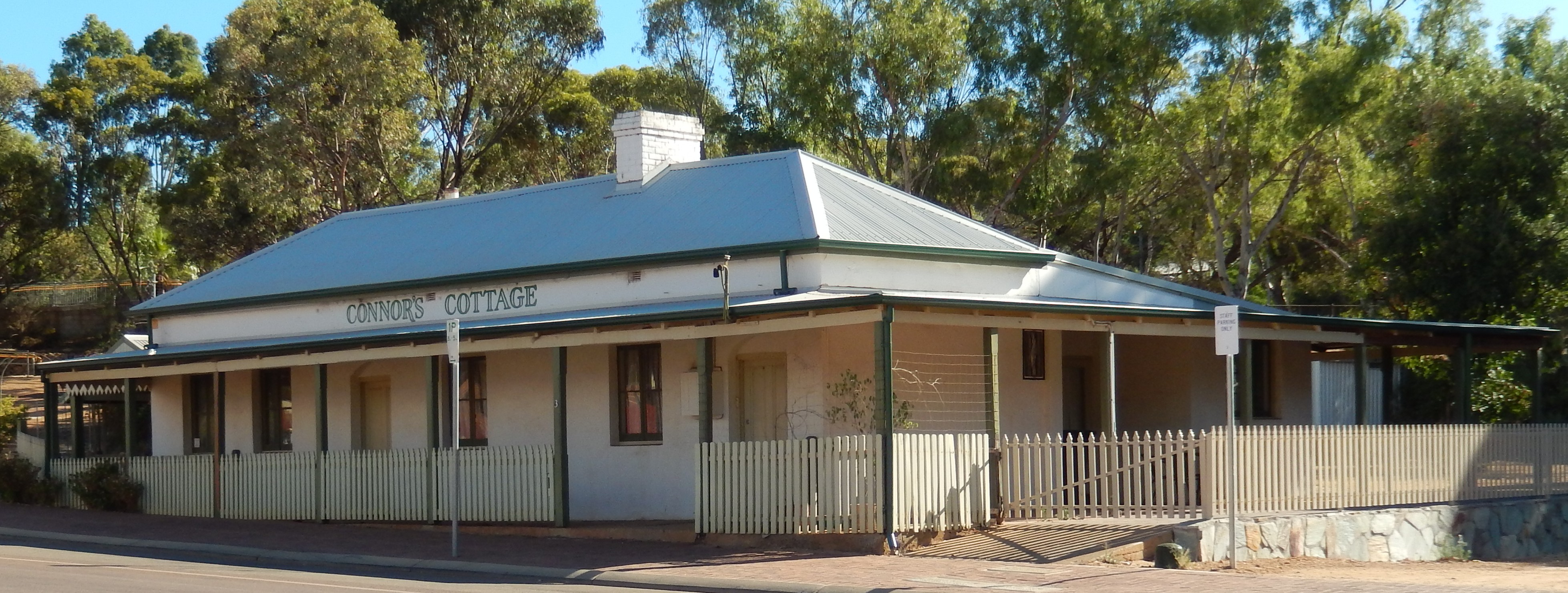
- Interactive map of the Connor's Cottage area
- Former names: Connor's Restaurant
- Alternative names: Ted Chapman's Cottage, Connor's House

General information
- Architectural style: Victorian Georgian
- Location: 5 Piesse Street, Toodyay, Australia
- Coordinates: 31.5509°S 116.4656°E
- Completed: c. 1870

Design and construction
- Main contractor: George Henry Hasell

References
- Toodyay municipal inventory

Connor's Cottage is situated on Piesse Street in Toodyay, Western Australia.

It was constructed about 1870 for Daniel Connor, a significant identity in the history of the development of the Toodyay town and district. The cottage is on one of the first large landholdings Connor acquired in the town site, on the corner of Stirling Terrace and Piesse Street. It is most likely the cottage was built by George Henry Hasell who also built the adjacent flour mill (Connor's Mill) for Connor around the same time. Another large residence (Connor's House) was built on the lot in about 1890.

Connor's Cottage is a single storey, painted brick building with a corrugated iron roof. A verandah extends around much of the building. Whilst originally built as a dwelling, the building has also been used as a bakery and restaurant, and a number of extensions have taken place over the years. The origin of the alternative name, Ted Chapman's Cottage, has not been confirmed.

Today the Toodyay Visitor Centre is located in between Connor's Mill and Connor's Cottage.
