= Early Days (journal) =

- Discipline: History of Western Australia
- Language: English

Publication details
- Former name(s): Journal and Proceedings
- History: 1927–present
- Publisher: Royal Western Australian Historical Society (Australia)

Standard abbreviations
- ISO 4: Early Days

Early Days is the annual academic journal of the Royal Western Australian Historical Society. The journal has been published regularly since 1927 and includes articles relating to the history of Western Australia written by society members or delivered at the monthly general meetings. Before 1938 it bore the title Journal and Proceedings.

== Publication ==
- Journal and proceedings (Western Australian Historical Society)
- Early days / Western Australian Historical Society.
- From 1962 issued by the Royal Western Australian Historical Society. Volume numbering erratic.
- Journal and proceedings (Western Australian Historical Society 1938–1949) Periodicals.
- New ser. v. 1 (Oct. 1938) – v. 10 (Dec. 1948)
- Early days: journal and proceedings of the Royal Western Australian Historical Society. Perth [W.A.]: The Society, 1978.

"For this re-printed edition, the name of the Journal appears in the standard form that was established in later years, and not precisely as it was at the time of original publication" Reproduced in 1978 from the original printings for The Royal Western Australian Historical Society, by General Printing, a division of West Australian Newspapers. Vol. 1, pt. 1 (1927) – v. 2, pt. 20 (1936)
