= Royal Western Australian Historical Society =

Historical organization in Western Australia

Royal Western Australian Historical Society has for many decades been the main association for Western Australians to collectively work for adequate understanding and protection of the cultural heritage of Perth and Western Australia.

== History ==
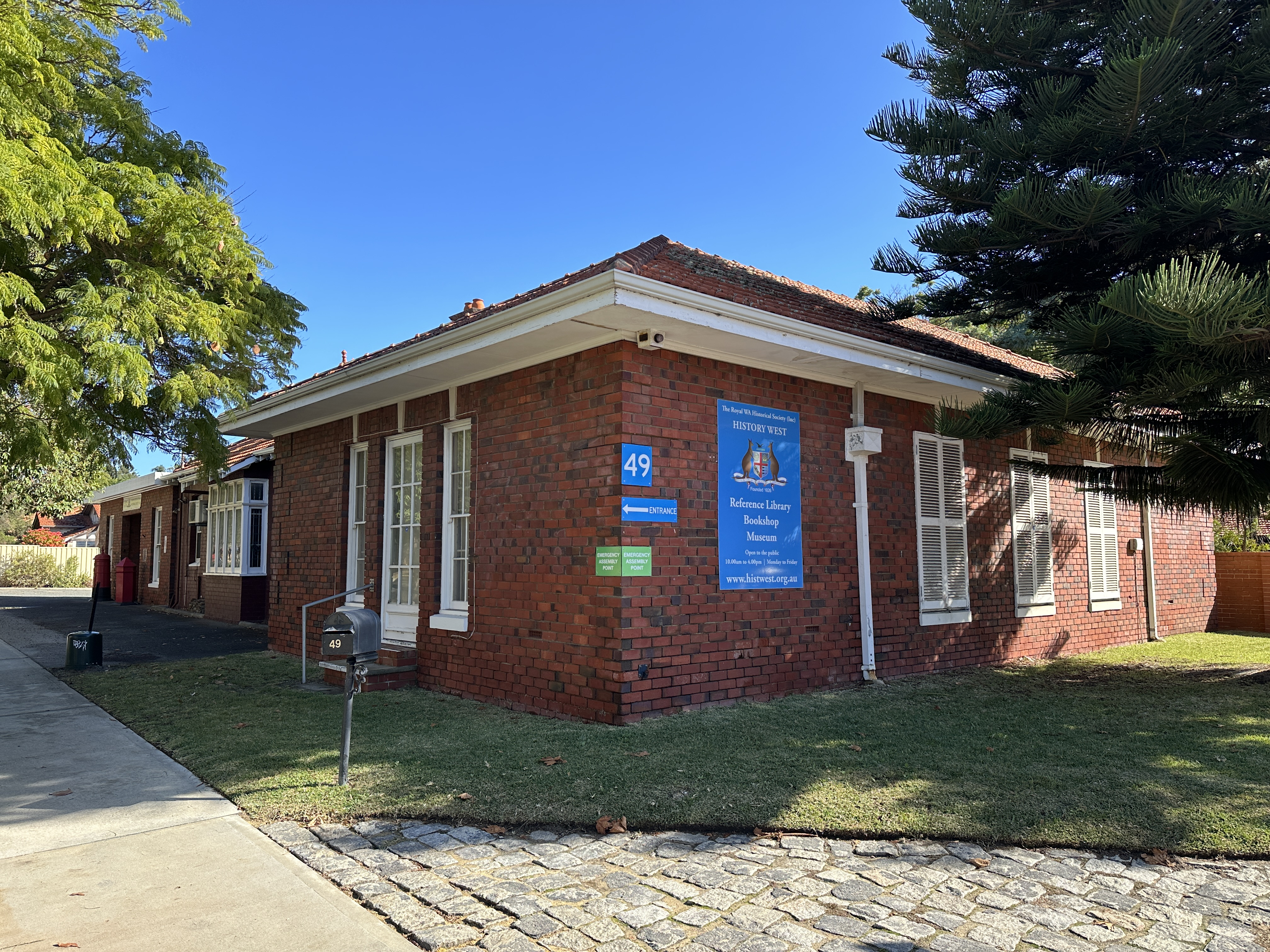
The Society's former headquarters in Nedlands

The society was founded in 1926. The Royal Charter adding the word 'Royal' to the organization name occurred in 1963. With membership including local historians and writers, it preceded the Western Australian branch of the National Trust and the History Council of Western Australia by decades.

Based in Nedlands it holds many important objects and archives relative to Western Australian history.

The RWAHS is a constituent member of the Federation of Australian Historical Societies.

A significant number of Western Australian historians, writers and public figures have been involved with the society.

== Early days ==
Early Days is the official journal and is published annually. It is one of the more lasting legacies of the society – a regular run of articles with a wide range of subjects concerning West Australian history.

- Early days : Journal of the Royal Western Australian Historical Society. ISSN 0312-6145
- (1987) Early days 1927–1985 index Nedlands, W.A Royal W.A. Historical Society.
- (1991) Supplement to Early days : 1927–1988, volumes 1 to 9 incl. index Nedlands, W.A. The Society. (Amendments and additions to 1st edition, April 1987, with additions for Vol. 9 pts. 4–6.).

== Notable members ==
- Wallace Elias Bickley Solomon (1878–1950) was the first secretary (and honorary solicitor) of the Society in 1926.
- Sir James Mitchell former Premier and Governor of the state had been President
- Paul Hasluck
- Rica Erickson
- Geoffrey Bolton

== Affiliated societies ==
The organisation has developed a network of over 70 affiliated historical societies from across Western Australia. Since 2010 the society has annually awarded a Merit Award to one of its affiliates. The inaugural award went to the Carnamah Historical Society for being a "dynamic, but very different society." The Esperance Bay Historical Society was the 2011 recipient "for its contribution to preserving local history". Other notable affiliated societies include Toodyay Historical Society, Augusta Historical Society.

== Other publications ==
- 70th birthday celebrations statewide program of historical walks, talks, tours, exhibitions, displays and special events : 10 January 1997 to 31 May 1997 published by The Royal Western Australian Historical Society; presented by the Society and its affiliated societies. Nedlands, W.A. 1997.

== See also ==
- National Trust of Australia
- History Council of Western Australia
