= Arthur Edwardes Growse =

Dr Arthur Edwardes Growse
- Born: 26 December 1831; London, England
- Died: 9 November 1877 (aged 45); Toodyay, Western Australia
- Occupation: Medical practitioner
- Spouse: Phoebe Henrietta née Postlethwaite (1858-1831)
- Children: 9

Arthur Edwardes (also spelt Edwards) Growse was a medical doctor who served the district of Toodyay in Western Australia from 1856 to 1872, then again for a year during 1876 to 1877. Growse was the second medical officer to serve Toodyay.

Growse was born on 26 December 1831 into "an old Suffolk family". He trained at St Guy's Hospital in London before coming to Western Australia in the early 1850s. He worked as a doctor at Guildford around 1855-56, then in 1856 he was appointed to Toodyay where he took over from Alfred Green. Green had been dismissed following the death of a patient, after it was alleged that he was drunk at the time.

In 1858 Growse married Phoebe Henrietta Postlethwaite, a country governess. Phoebe came to Australia on Lady Grey in March 1843, and for a time had lived in Government House with Mrs Fitzgerald, the wife of Governor Charles Fitzgerald. The Growse's marriage was a fruitful one, with nine children being born to the couple, seven in Tooodyay and two in Williams, where Growse worked for a time before returning to Toodyay. It is this large brood of children that led to speculation about the building of the two-storey doctor's residence, known as "The Ship", when it became the property of the Sisters of Mercy.

Apart from the usual maladies suffered by his patients, Growse had to contend with the 1861 measles epidemic that took such a large toll amongst the Aborigines in the region. A recently arrived passenger ship in King George Sound in 1860 was believed to be source of the epidemic. It travelled northwards, causing the deaths of settlers and Aborigines alike. Twelve Aborigines had been brought to the Newcastle Depot infirmary for treatment. A hut had been built for the patients, but when one died the others refused to stay thinking the doctor's medicine was poison and the hut a death house.

Growse was an active member of the community. In 1868 he was a signatory to the petition for the resumption of work on the town's reservoir. Drinkable water was a major issue during times of drought, especially when the main well at the depot was in danger of drying up. In 1871 Growse served for a short time as chairman of the first Toodyay Road Board. His chairmanship was short lived; he was transferred in 1872 to Guildford, then to Williams where he served as resident magistrate for a short time as well as being the district medical officer. He was replaced in Toodyay by William Mayhew.

In 1876 Growse returned to Newcastle (Toodyay) following Mayhew's appointment to Pinjarra, but Growse's tenure would be short. It appears he was falling on hard times, being declared a bankrupt in May 1877. He was a hard working doctor and in November of that year, after attending to two patients on a wet rainy night, he caught pneumonia and died.

An obituary in the Eastern Districts Chronicle refers to the "kindliness of heart and the assiduous manner in which he performed his duties", which "made him a general favourite".

He was buried in Toodyay's Nardie Cemetery.
