= Municipality of Newcastle =

Former local government area in Western Australia

Coordinates: 31°33′13″S 116°27′58″E

- Local government area
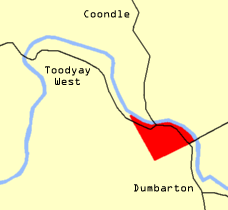
- Country: Australia
- State: Western Australia
- Region: Wheatbelt
- Established: 1877
- Abolished: 1912
- Council seat: Toodyay

Area
  - Total: 1.6 km^{2} (0.62 sq mi)

Population
  - Total: 334 (1911)
  - Density: 209/km^{2} (541/sq mi)

The Municipality of Newcastle was a local government area in the Wheatbelt region of Western Australia, about 85 kilometres (53 mi) north-east of Perth. The municipality covered an area of 395 acres (1.60 km^{2}), existed from 1877 until 1912, and was based in the town of Toodyay, which was known as Newcastle until 1910.

== History ==
The municipality was established on 28 September 1877 by proclamation under the Municipal Institutions' Act 1876. Entirely surrounded by the Toodyay Road District, it was located on the south side of the Avon River, extending west to Lukin Street and south to Pelham Reserve to include all of the main town. The municipal council consisted of seven elected members, three each of whom represented the East Ward and West Ward (separated by Duke Street) and a chairman (titled mayor from 1887). On 4 June 1910, the municipality was formally renamed Toodyay at a meeting of the council, although the change was never gazetted.

Its first election was held on Monday 19 November 1877, at which Charles Samuel Monger won 26 votes against Arthur Wroth's 20 to become the first chairman. An observer writing in 1878 commented that the previously neglected streets had markedly improved in their condition.

Most elections were uncontested (the last mayoral contest took place in 1903) and the Newcastle Herald newspaper often lamented the low turnout at contested elections and at ratepayers' meetings. The council's small revenue, which could not easily increase due to the amount of non-rateable Government property and the failure to merge North Toodyay into the municipality, was outstripped by the cost of administration. By 1911, the council had £50 to spend on roads, and was seeking from the state government £350 to improve Stirling Terrace and £250 for the town hall. The Minister for Works, W. J. George, suggested amalgamation with the Toodyay Road District. At a ratepayers' meeting on 28 August 1911, which only two ratepayers attended, Mayor Jonathon Somers formally proposed amalgamation. A referendum held on 12 September 1911 resulted in a petition to the minister to dissolve the municipality.

On 27 February 1912, the Municipality of Toodyay amalgamated into the Toodyay Road Board, its area becoming a new Central Ward with two councillors.

== Population ==
| Year | Population |
|---|---|
| 1881 | 208 |
| 1891 | 742 |
| 1901 | 339 |
| 1911 | 334 |

== See also ==
- List of shire presidents of Toodyay
