= History Council of Western Australia =

- Formation: 19 March 2003
- Type: Non-profit
- Location: Perth, Western Australia
- President: Samantha Owen
- Website: www.facebook.com/Historycouncilwa

The History Council of Western Australia is a non-profit organisation dedicated to promoting the study, preservation and use of history in Western Australia.

Founded in 2003, the History Council of Western Australia aims to promote an "active engagement with history" across broader society. The council has actively engaged in historical advocacy campaigns since its formation, such as their engagement with the debate surrounding the 2011–2012 Elizabeth Quay development.

The council is run by an elected committee comprising historians and academics, while other parties and individuals can become members through a paid subscription.

The council works to promote historical engagement through the organisation and promotion of related events to the public. It produces several regular publications, including an annual report and a seasonal newsletter for members.

== History ==
The History Council of Western Australia was formed on 19 March 2003, following several years of planning. The council received assistance during its establishment from the Western Australian History Foundation, which provided financial support and funded a trip for the History Council of New South Wales' former president, Dr Shirley Fitzgerald, to provide guidance during the establishment of the WA Council.

The council has collaborated with other historical societies and organisations in Western Australia, such as the Royal Western Australian Historical Society, and the National Trust of Australia. The National Trust assisted the council in allowing their archives to be stored within Samson House in Fremantle. The State Library of Western Australia has also expressed interest in adding the council's archives to their collection, though as of January 2022 this has yet to occur.

The council has been identified as a relevant organisation by the Australian Government and it is officially represented on two committees – the National Archive of Australia Consultative Forum and the State Records Advisory Committee. The council has been unable to secure representation within a statutory body like the Heritage Council of Western Australia.

In 2019 it was announced at the Australian Historical Association's annual meeting that the History Council of Western Australia, along with the History Councils of South Australia, Victoria, and New South Wales, had adopted the "Value of History" statement to guide their strategic focuses. Adapted from a campaign created by US based historical societies in 2012, it places emphasis on the value of history in relation to:

- Shaping identities
- Engaging citizens
- Economic development
- Critical thinking skills
- Benefiting communities
- Encouraging leadership
- Creating legacies

== Advocacy ==
The History Council of WA is an historical advocacy organisation; as stated within its charter, it is "dedicated to promoting the study, preservation and use of history in Western Australia". The main activities of the council centre around historical advocacy undertaken for the stated purpose of benefiting the Western Australian community.

=== Advocacy issues ===
The council's advocacy efforts are focused on the key issues:

- The promotion of access to family records
- The preservation of arts and culture
- Heritage preservation
- The promotion of quality historical education
- The incorporation of historians onto all committees so that policy makers factor historical impact into decision making

=== Campaigns ===
==== Premier's History Award ====
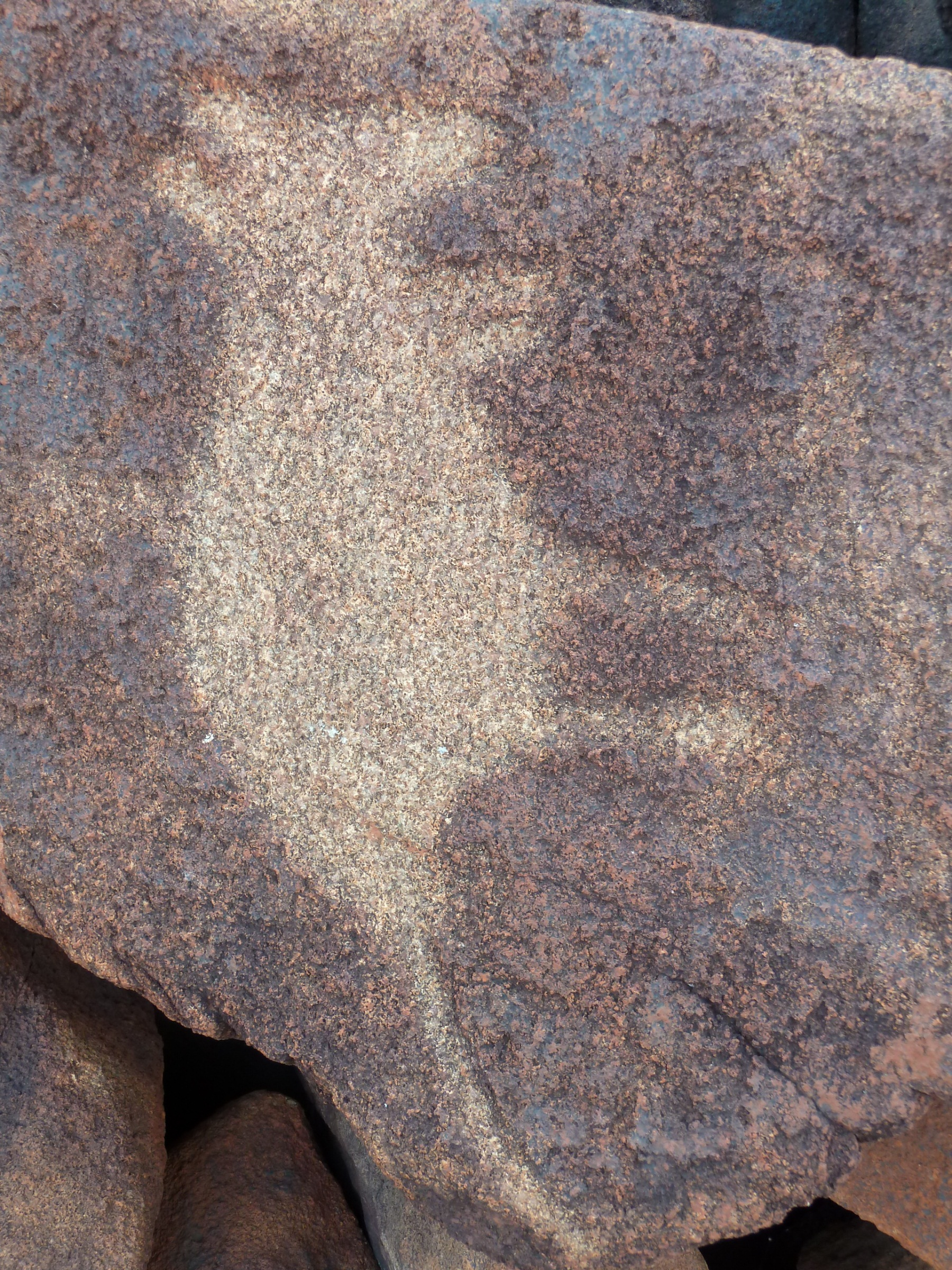
Aboriginal rock art from the Burrup Peninsula

In 2004 the council was successful in lobbying for a history prize to be included as an award in the Western Australian Premier's Book Awards. This resulted in the addition of the Western Australian History category, which included in the award a $7,500 cash prize, increased to $10,000 in 2008, sponsored by the Department of Culture and the Arts. The History prize was awarded to works of Western Australian historical literature that were found to have made a "major contribution to the understanding of Western Australia's past". This category was included in the WA Premier's Book Awards from 2004 to 2016, though the council has since campaigned unsuccessfully for the history awards to be included again.

==== Dampier Rock Art Precinct ====
In 2006 the council was active in its support of the campaign to preserve the Dampier Rock Art Precinct in response to the Governments move to encourage industrial expansion in the region. Later in 2006 the state government announced that 60 percent of the Dampier Rock Art Precinct would be protected land; the council continued to lobby state and federal governments for further protections. On 17 January 2013 the Murujuga region within the Dampier Rock Art Precinct officially became a national park.

==== Perth waterfront ====
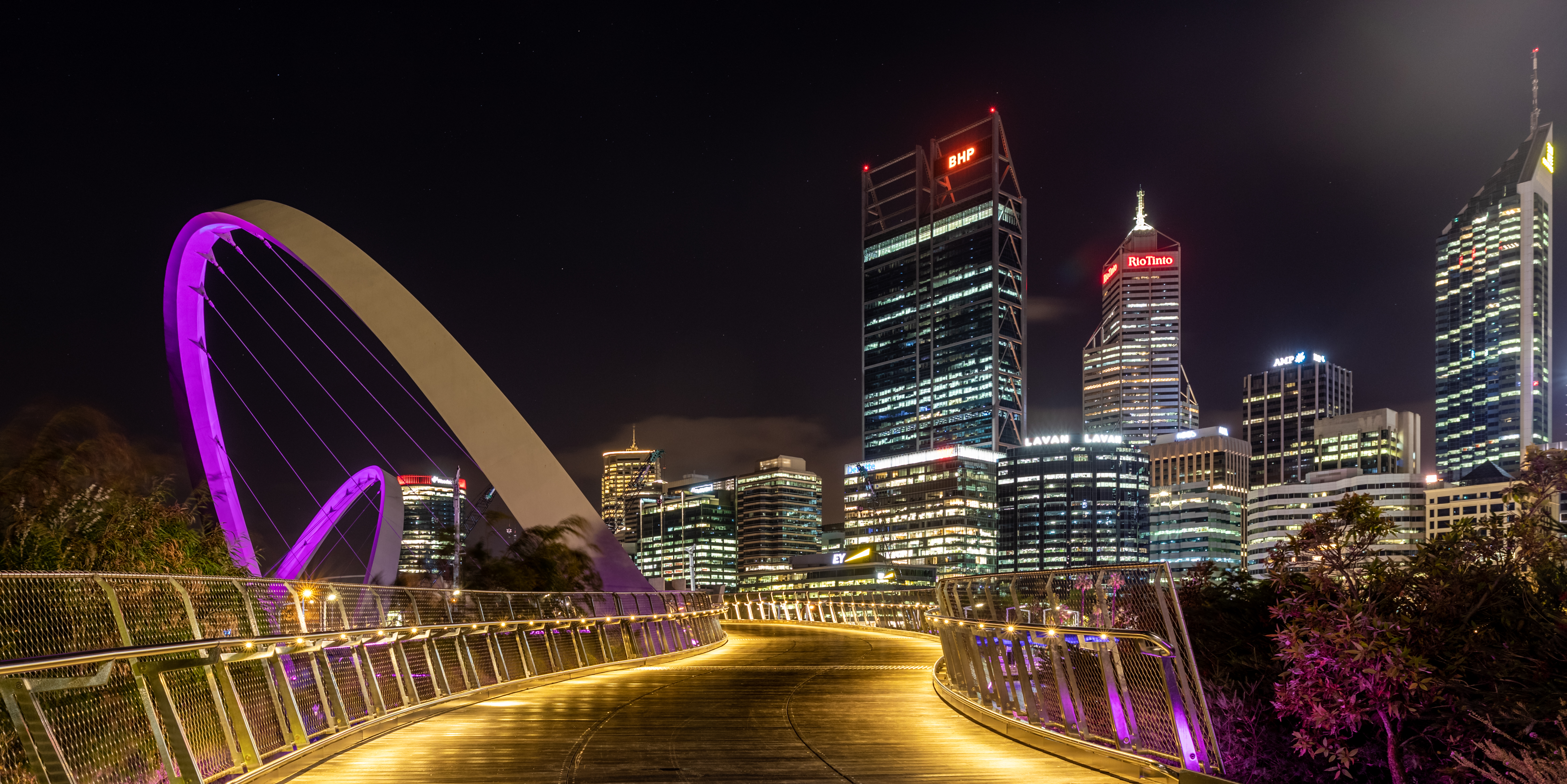
View of Elizabeth Quay at night, 2019

The Council engaged in advocating against the loss of heritage in response to the proposed development of Elizabeth Quay on the Perth waterfront in 2011. The council was not directly opposing renovations to the area, instead emphasised that the proposed plans were ignorant of the area's heritage value. The campaigning involved the council submitting a letter highlighting its concerns to the State Government, organising its own forums to bring attention to the issue, and the promotion of a public rally to object to the proposal in February 2012. Despite the objections from the council and other parties, the project remains in development.

==== State archives ====
In working to promote historical preservation the council has taken part in actively lobbying the State Government for the adequate funding of historical archives since its formation, including the State Records Office of Western Australia. During 2008 the council sent a letter to the Premier's office and later met with a senior staff member to discuss the limited space available in state archival institutions to store State Government records. The Premiers office agreed that it was an issue that needed to be addressed, though no further commitments were made by the State Government to resolve the issue. The council has continued lobbying for this issue, though as of 2017 the council has been unsuccessful as the funding and resources needed to ensure the continued maintenance and expansion of the archives has not been secured.

== Structure ==
The organisational structure consists of the committee, which acts as the governing body of the organisation, and paid members who are either individual subscribers or part of a corporate subscription. The councillors within the committee are elected for one year by the members at the annual general meeting in June.

=== Committee ===
The committee is composed of the executive members and council members. Within the executive membership the roles have included the president, vice president, secretary, treasurer, and the membership secretary. As of 2017 the membership secretary position has been removed due funding issues. The number of committee members has fluctuated between 4 and 18 since the council's formation, and as of 2025 is 16.

2024-2025 Committee members
	Role	Name
Executive members	President	Samantha Owen
Executive members	Vice-president	Michael Nind
Executive members	Secretary	Rosinda Seara
Executive members	Treasurer	Sian Ferraz
Executive members	Membership secretary	Sue Lefroy
Committee members	Councillor (Indigenous representative)	Shino Konishi
Committee members	Councillor (Postgraduate representative)	Naomi Preston
Committee members	Councillor	Jane Lydon
Committee members	Councillor	Erica Boyne
Committee members	Councillor	Andre Brett
Committee members	Councillor	Elizabeth Burns-Dans
Committee members	Councillor	Joseph Christensen
Committee members	Councillor	Toni Church
Committee members	Councillor	Justin Owen
Committee members	Councillor	Paul Arthur
Committee members	Councillor	Jane King

=== Membership ===
Members not part of the committee pay a yearly fee. Membership is open to individuals and corporate organisations. The number of members has seen a recent decline, listed as having 54 in the 2018 to 2019 period compared with 77 in the 2017 to 2018 period, and 72 in the 2016 to 2017 period.

Some of the corporate member organisations have included:

- Friends of Battye Library
- National Archives of Australia
- Royal WA Historical Society
- State Library of Western Australia
- State Records Office of Western Australia
- University of Western Australia Historical Society

== Events ==
In conjunction with the AGM an annual lecture is hosted by the council, where history scholars – including present and past committee members – present a lecture on a historical or related topic. The first lecture held by the council in 2004 was presented by Australian historian Geoffrey Bolton and directly addressed the council and the future of its operations, where he proposed the council focus on the evolution of dialect in Western Australia and Aboriginal influence.

The council has organised several "History in the Pub" events that are open to the public. The first event, "Entertaining History", was held in March 2007, and continued to be held yearly until 2010, later becoming infrequently held in 2011 and 2012. In 2009 the event was held with Ruth Marchant James, a member of the council committee, as the guest speaker in celebration of her receiving the Premier's Book Award History Prize.

The council has held and organised a range of public forums for discussing historical issues. In November 2011 as part of the council's campaign surrounded the Perth waterfront redevelopment the council held the "More than grass: exploring the Esplanade" forum to discuss the historical significance of the area. In the same year the council also hosted a forum focused on the Australian Curriculum Framework to plan an Australian history curriculum for students from primary school up to year 10.

== Publications ==
The Council first published a newsletter for its member in December 2003, which summarised the activities of the organisation since its formation earlier that year. From 2005 onwards the council has published a seasonal newsletter for its members, typically including a summary of the organisation's recent activities, planned events such as seminars and social gatherings, updates from committee meetings, and information about recent campaigning and advocacy efforts.

Following its AGM the council publishes the president's report, also referred to in some years as the annual report. The report lists the elected committee members for the following 12-month term and contain a summary of the previous year's relevant activities. It includes a description of the future goals of the council, and indicates how it plans to achieve them.

== Funding ==
The funding of the council is primarily sourced from annual membership fees, grants, and fundraisers.

The foundation of the council was initially supported by a $25,000 grant from the Western Australian History Foundation in 2004. The council has received several grants from the Western Australian History Foundation since its establishment, including: a 2012 grant received to support the Councils organisational activities, grants of $6000 in 2013 and $6000 in 2014 to support the employment of the executive assistant position, and in 2017 for the purposes of redeveloping the organisations website and newsletter. Although in 2017 the council's application for a grant for the funding of the executive officer position was rejected and as of June 2017 the position was removed from the council.

The council has also received grants from Lotterywest in 2014, totalling $5250, which enabled it to hire a consultant for strategic planning purposes.
