= William Mayhew (doctor) =

- Born: 1821; Colchester, England
- Died: 17 May 1905 (aged 83–84); Northam, Western Australia
- Occupation: Medical practitioner
- Spouse: Alicia née Coloughley (1846 – 1892)

William Mayhew (1821 – 17 May 1905) was a medical practitioner in the Toodyay district of Western Australia. Mayhew was appointed medical officer for Toodyay in 1872 when the previous doctor, Arthur Edwardes Growse was transferred to Guildford. His original vocation was that of a teacher, and he and his wife Alicia had come to Western Australia to take up appointments in this profession. It is assumed that Mayhew had acquired his medical training in England before his arrival in Western Australia in 1867.

Mayhew was born in 1821 in Colchester, England, to William and Sophia Mayhew. In 1846 he married Alicia Coloughley (1823–1892). The couple had accepted positions as teachers in Western Australia, sharing a joint salary of £200 per annum. They arrived at Fremantle on the Palestine on 11 August 1867, however Mayhew decided to pursue a medical career instead. He worked as a medical officer at Port Walcott in 1868, and in 1870 became a registered doctor. The following year he was appointed assistant colonial surgeon at Albany, then in August 1872 he replaced Growse as Toodyay's resident medical officer.

Mayhew's interest in education saw him joining the Toodyay District's Board of Education in 1874. The other board members who were prominent in the district included Samuel Pole Phillips, Augustus Lee Steere, James Sinclair and Daniel Connor.

In 1876 Mayhew was transferred to Pinjarra as district medical officer for a year, returning to Toodyay in 1877 to resume his position as the district medical officer. Although he soon retired from this position, Mayhew continued to live and practice as a doctor in Toodyay, helping both settlers and Aboriginals, particularly during a severe measles epidemic that broke out during 1883-84. During these years the Mayhews lived in a cottage in town rented from Mr J T Woods. Around 1885 they moved into the house formerly occupied by Growse and now owned by Dr Waylen. The house had been vacant and in 1885 Waylen employed Joseph Ablett Wroth to undertake repairs to make it habitable. It seems the Mayhews' move to the edge of town was much appreciated by some townsfolk:

The "Old Doctor" was popular and capable, but his wife was a difficult neighbour. Her menagerie of pets were burdensome to the townspeople. The dogs barked constantly, and her pet goat was such a nuisance at Monger's store that the shop assistant killed it. After Mrs Mayhew stormed down to the store and upbraided him, proceedings for slander were instituted against her. So doubtless the townspeople and the long suffering doctor were equally pleased at the prospect of his new home.

In February 1892 Mayhew's wife Alicia died. The running of the household was then taken over by his daughter Beatrice Alice Princess Eugene, who the otherwise childless couple had adopted in 1875. A couple of years later in 1895 Mayhew suffered serious injury when he was thrown out of a sulky while he was travelling to visit a patient. He was confined to bed for some time while being cared for by his daughter.

Mayhew continued to work. In 1902, soon after the new Newcastle Hospital in Duke Street had been closed due to running costs and insufficient patients, it had to be re-opened. An arrangement was made whereby Mayhew and his daughter, who was appointed an acting nurse, could live in the hospital providing an emergency service. Mayhew received a yearly allowance, while Beatrice was given £1 a week, with four shillings allocated per patient per day to cover meals. This arrangement continued until 1904 when Mayhew left to live in Pinjarra with his daughter and her husband.

Mayhew died in Northam on 17 May 1905.
