= Bejoording, Western Australia =

Bejoording
- Town
- Interactive map of Bejoording
- Coordinates: 31.382°S 116.51°E
- Country: Australia
- State: Western Australia
- LGA: Shire of Toodyay
- Location: 110 km (68 mi) NE of Perth; 20 km (12 mi) N of Toodyay; 29 km (18 mi) SW of Goomalling
- Established: 1899

Government
  - State electorate: Moore
  - Federal division: Bullwinkel

Area
  - Total: 88.7 km^{2} (34.2 sq mi)
- Elevation: 223 m (732 ft)

Population
  - Total: 157 (SAL 2021)
- Postcode: 6566

Bejoording is a small town in the Wheatbelt region of Western Australia.

The first European to visit the area was George Fletcher Moore, who explored the area in 1836. Moore recorded the Aboriginal name of the area as Bejoording.

The land was earmarked to be developed as a townsite in 1839 and left vacant for that purpose. In 1856 the first lots were sold and the townsite was gazetted in 1899.
