= Stirling House =

House in Toodyay, Western Australia

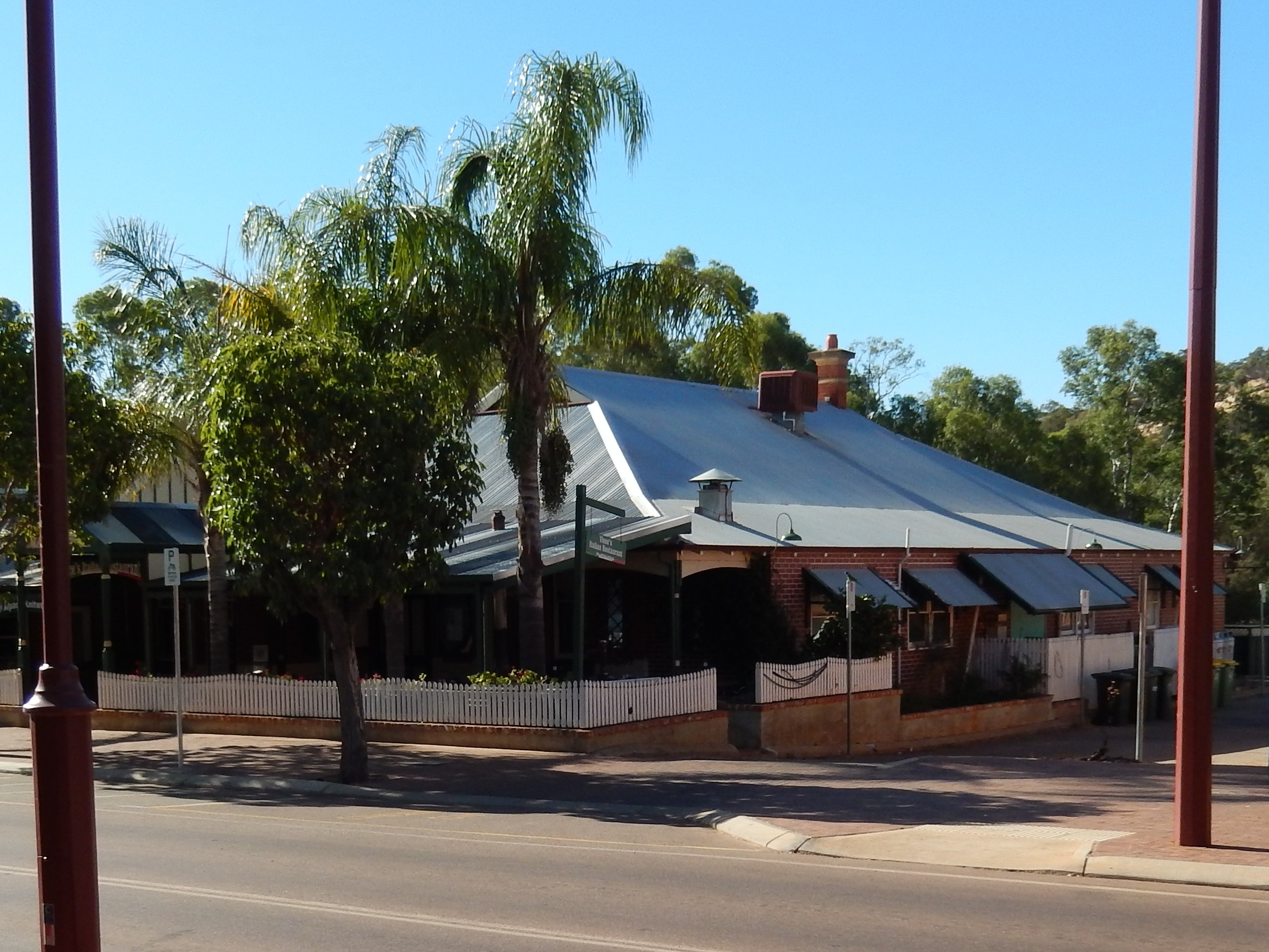
- Interactive map of the Stirling House area
- Former names: Toodyay Gentlemen's Club, Toodyay Club

General information
- Architectural style: Federation Bungalow
- Location: 122B Stirling Terrace, Toodyay, Australia
- Coordinates: 31.5501°S 116.4662°E
- Completed: 1908

Design and construction
- Architect: Richard Joseph Dennehy
- Main contractor: James Barker Meredith

References
- Toodyay municipal inventory

Stirling House is located on Stirling Terrace in Toodyay, Western Australia.

It was constructed in 1908, purpose built as clubrooms for the Toodyay Club (a gentlemen's social club), which remained in residence until 1976.

The Toodyay Club was established in 1905. Instrumental in its formation were Bernard Maurice Connor, Dr. Crawford and Charles Maxwell Lukin. Vernon Hammersley was president in 1906 and initial meetings were held in a disused store. In January 1908 local builder James Barker Meredith of Newcastle won the contract to build the premises, now known as Stirling House. The Perth architect was Richard Joseph Dennehy. The building was opened for meetings in about August of the same year; the official opening ceremony was performed by Admiral Sir Frederick Bedford. (Although no reference is made in the club minutes the old clubrooms were vacant by September.) One of the club's most distinguished members in earlier years was John Forrest who retained his membership until his death in 1918.

By July 1975 the Toodyay Club and the Toodyay Bowling Club had amalgamated, and on 12 February 1977 officially celebrated the opening of their new premises in Oldfellows Street (on the site of the old railway stockyards). In the meantime, in October 1976, the Toodyay Shire Council acquired the property.

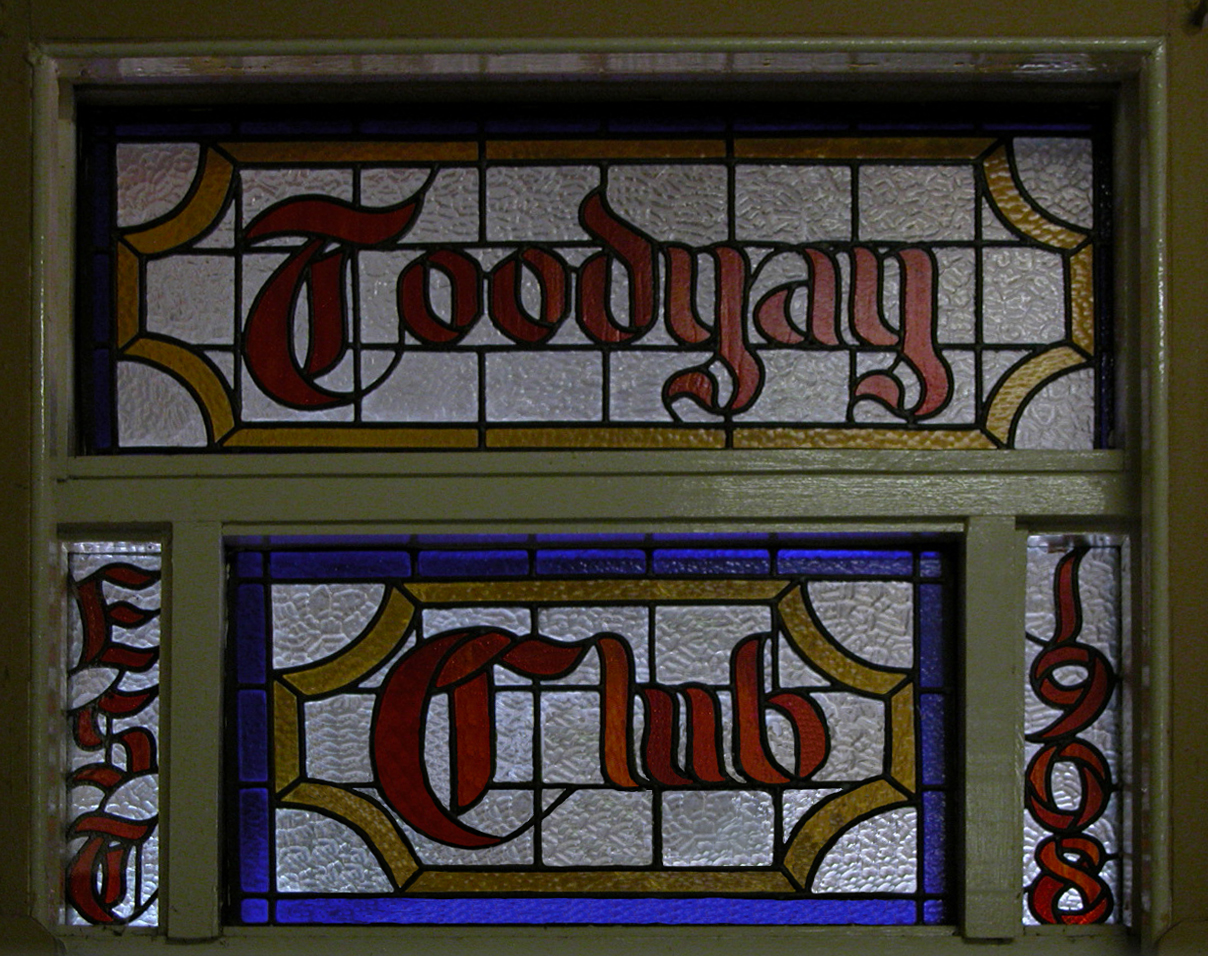
Stained glass in the entrance to Stirling House

Stirling House has since been used as a doctor's surgery, and for shops and eateries. Today the building is a much altered single storey structure with substantial additions to the side and rear elevations. The shop adjoining the restaurant was constructed c. 2000. Although parts of the early form of the building can still be seen, the alterations obscure its original character. Some original fittings remain inside, including stained glass door panels.
