= Connor's Mill =

Flour mill in Toodyay, Western Australia

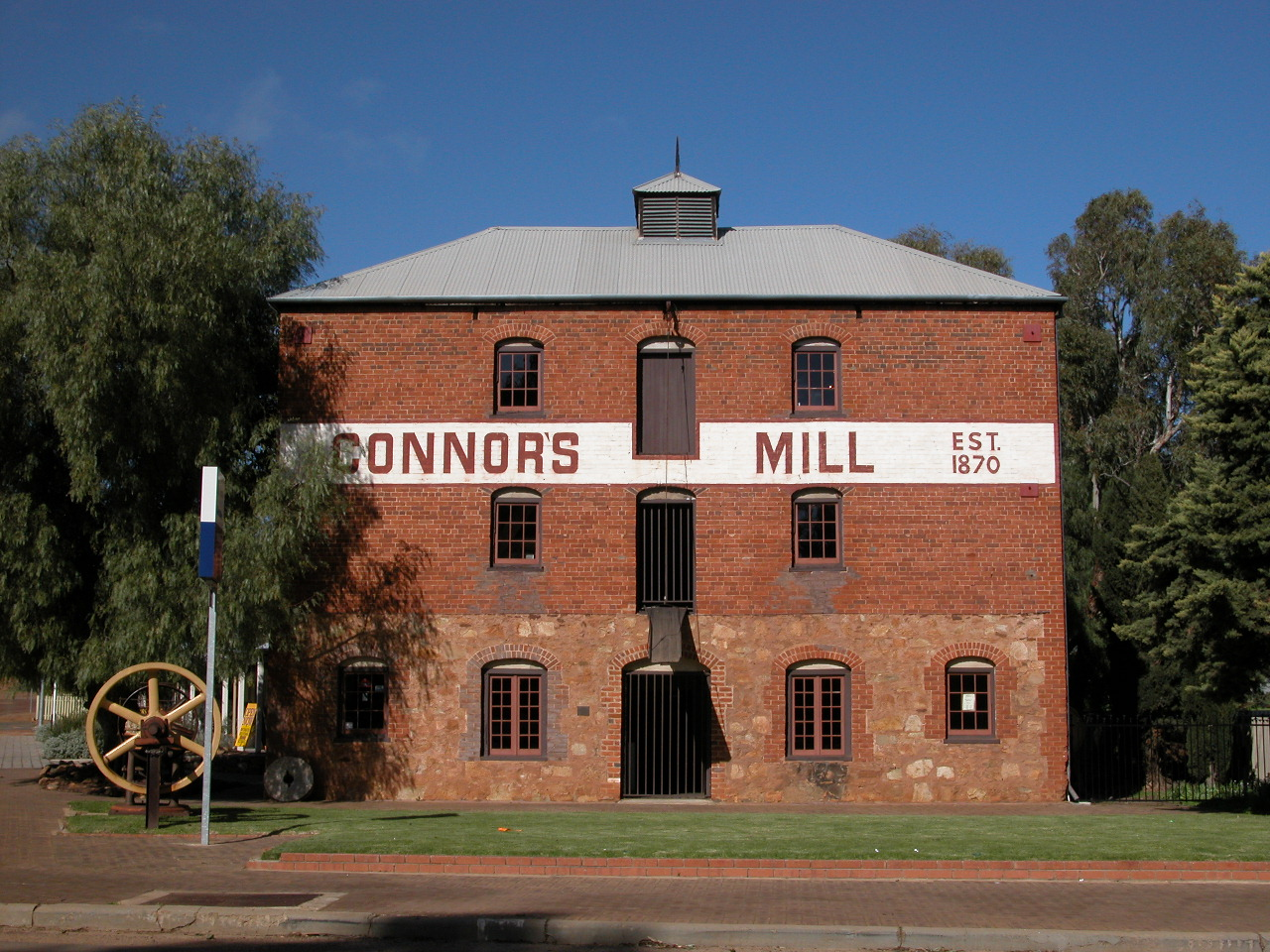
- Connor's Mill facade (July 2004)

- Location within Western Australia

General information
- Type: Heritage-listed building
- Location: Toodyay, Western Australia
- Coordinates: 31°33′1.7″S 116°27′55.1″E

Western Australia Heritage Register
- Type: State Registered Place
- Designated: 17 February 2006
- Reference no.: 2567

Connor's Mill is a steam driven flour mill located on Stirling Terrace in Toodyay, Western Australia.

The mill is still operational; the Shire of Toodyay protected the then dilapidated building in 1975 and established the Toodyay Tourist Centre. It is now one of the town's main tourist attractions.

== History ==
The mill was built in 1870 by local builder George Hassel for Dan Connor, a store owner. It was the third built in the Toodyay district. The mill originally had a shingle roof, no turret and a slide from the first floor doorway to wagon height. This was used to slide bags of flour onto the wagons waiting below. Little is known about the internal workings of the mill. The original grind mill is seen on the lawn outside. The grindstone machine was originally from Newgain and donated by Langley Lefroy and initially owned by the Twines. The big wheel drive mechanism was originally from the mill at Northam.

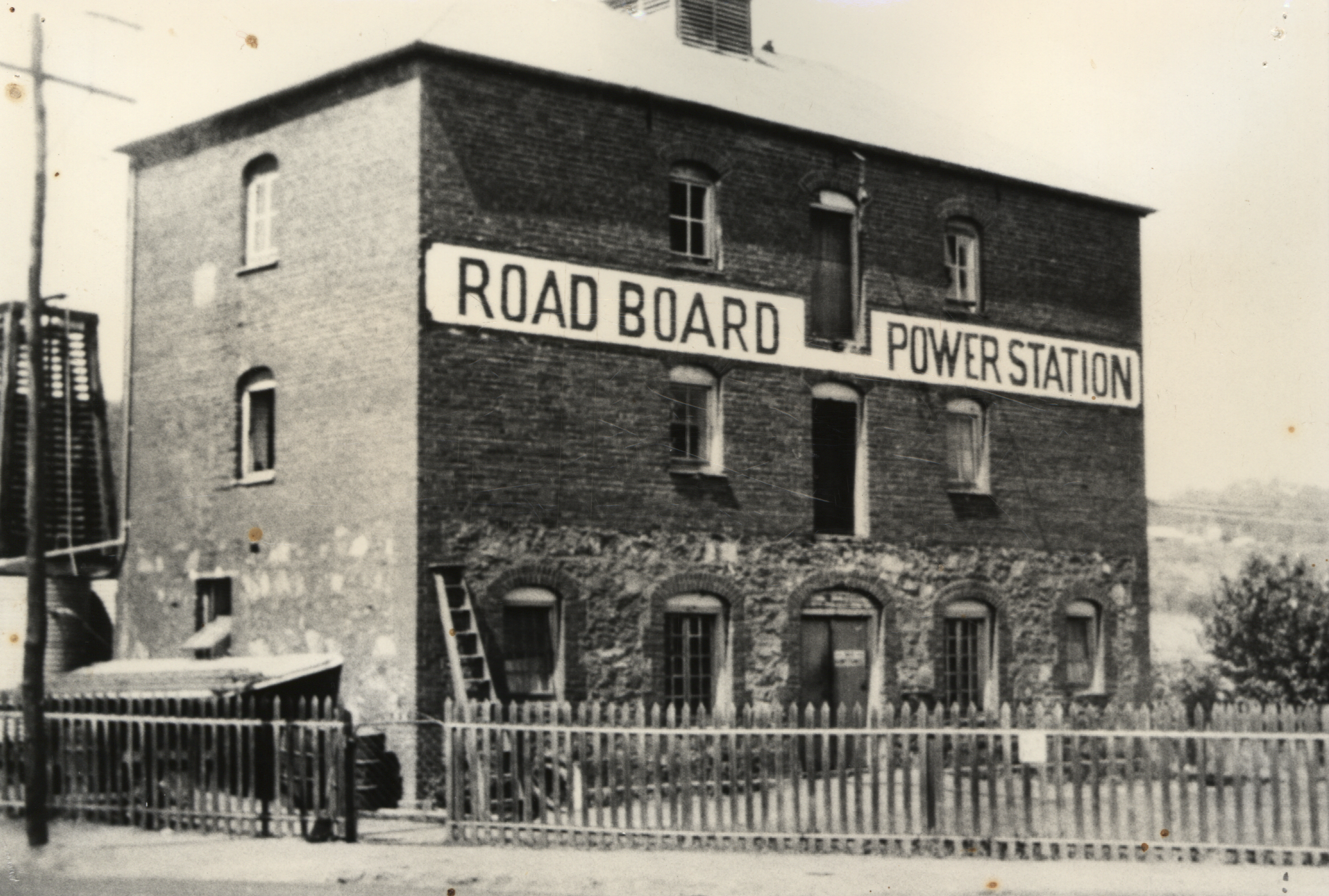
Toodyay Road Board Power Station circa 1920s

During the 1880s Charles Marris leased and eventually bought the mill, operating it until the turn of the century. The flour produced was of very high quality, presenting the established Drummond and Monger mills with good competition. In 1870, flour from the mill won an award at an exhibition in Melbourne.

In 1917, Charles Marris sold the mill to Charles Lukin, who reconditioned the building as a power station for the town. The first power generating engine was installed in a galvanized iron extension to the rear of the mill. In 1921, a major fire destroyed all machinery within the power house. The charred top floor roofing beams are still evident today.

After the fire, engineer Mr N. Garvey installed a new Stockport gas engine in the annex to provide power to the town. This generator had a unique starting procedure. The operator would place a foot on a flywheel spoke, held onto the roof timbers and treadmill the belt. When sufficient momentum was obtained, the operator would jump off the wheel and turn the magneto on.

In 1922 the Road Board assumed control of the power service. The generator provided lighting to the town from 4pm to midnight, seven nights a week. The Municipal Council ran the power station until 1955, when the electrical grid operated by the State Energy Commission was connected to Toodyay. The building was deserted from 1955 to 1975.

== Current use ==
In 1975 the Shire of Toodyay established the Toodyay Tourist Centre in the mill building, following a restoration project which included the construction of a staircase to the upper floors.

The engine was donated to the Shire in 1974 and ex industrial factory engineer Graham Jones helped move the engine to its present location. Due to the engine's size, bricks from around the front door had to be removed.
