= Jager Stores =

Historic building in Toodyay, Western Australia

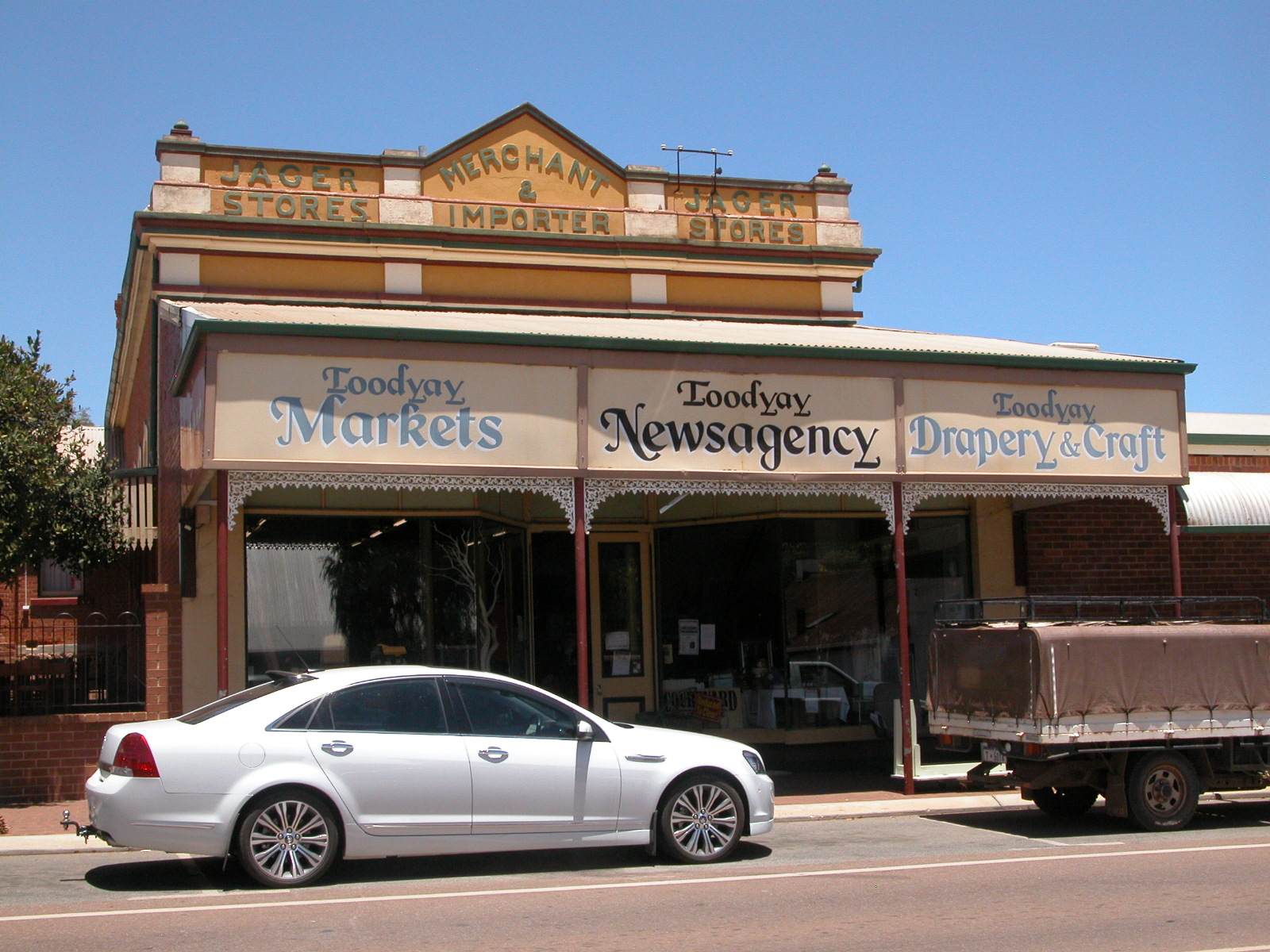
- Interactive map of the Jager Stores area
- Former names: Manchester Unity Independent Order of Oddfellows Hall

General information
- Architectural style: Victorian Classical with Federation Filigree additions
- Location: 111-113 Stirling Terrace, Toodyay
- Coordinates: 31.5501°S 116.4677°E
- Completed: 1897

Design and construction
- Main contractor: Edmund Glover Hasson, William Wallace Hasson

References
- Toodyay municipal inventory

Jager Stores is a heritage-listed building on Stirling Terrace in Toodyay, Western Australia. It was originally built as an Oddfellows Hall.

== History ==
=== Oddfellows' Hall, 1897-1908 ===
It was built in 1897 when the pensioner guard cottage occupying the site was demolished and a hall was constructed for the Independent Order of Oddfellows Manchester Unity. At the time the Oddfellows society had attracted many members, partly due to the benefits available at times of sickness and misfortune.

The local Hasson brothers won the tender for the building's construction in the township then known as Newcastle with a quote of nearly £90. On 9 July 1897 the hall was officially opened and on 8 July 1898 it was dedicated by W.E. Wray, the Provincial Corresponding Secretary of the Western Australian District of the Oddfellows. He was assisted by Charles Riley, Anglican Bishop of Perth. This occasion was also the 22nd anniversary of the formation of the local Oddfellows branch - the Loyal Toodyay Lodge 6211, Newcastle.

The building was available for public use and became a popular place for theatre, opera and travelling shows. It was also used for Municipal Council meetings and as a venue for the Anglican Church's annual bazaar. On 13 January 1900 a farewell social was held here for Henry (Harry) Wilberforce Clarkson, who was sailing to South Africa and the Boer War on 3 February with the second contingent of the Western Australian Mounted Infantry. In October 1900 an exhibition of the phonograph was mounted in the hall.

On 6 November 1907 the Newcastle Mayor, Abraham Myers, held a Mayor's Ball in the Oddfellows’ Hall to celebrate his first year in office. This "unique event", which featured a marquee as the supper room, was attended by 160 people. "At the front of the Hall, the raised verandah was enclosed to form a card and refreshment room." On 24 February 1908 John Forrest, Minister for Works, was the honoured guest at a banquet hosted by the Mayor at the Oddfellows Hall and spoke about "Federal politics and why he retired from office".

=== Padbury Colonial Stores, 1908-1912 ===
In 1908 the hall was sold; William Padbury purchased the building and added an extension, converting it into a store and warehouse. A drop scene, some side screens and furniture, no longer required by the new owner, were purchased by the local Mechanics' Institute for use in their premises (now the Toodyay Public Library).

Padbury titled his business The Colonial Stores. By 1912 the Western Australian Post Office Directory listed WM. Padbury as "merchant, flour miller, importer, ironmonger, draper & grocer, machinery & implement importer" with other stores at Guildford and Moora. In September of that year the company came to be known as Padbury Stores Limited.

=== Padbury Stores Ltd., 1912-1917 ===
In 1916, during the First World War, a huge pumpkin, christened "Big Ben", was displayed in the window of the Toodyay store to raise money for the Sandbag League. Threepence was charged per entry, and a prize was given to the person who guessed its correct weight. In June 1917 Padbury Stores Limited sold its Toodyay branch business to Alfred John James.

=== James' Store, 1917-1939 ===
In February 1922 Alfred James organised a display of Western Australian made items in his shop window, promoting the purchase of "Westralian" products. These included groceries, crockery and housewares.

By March 1936 Otto Herman Jager was managing James' store. On 10 March 1939 a "closing down" sale on the site was promoted, and two weeks later a bankrupt James' assets were advertised for tender in The West Australian newspaper.

=== Jager's Store, 1939-1969 ===
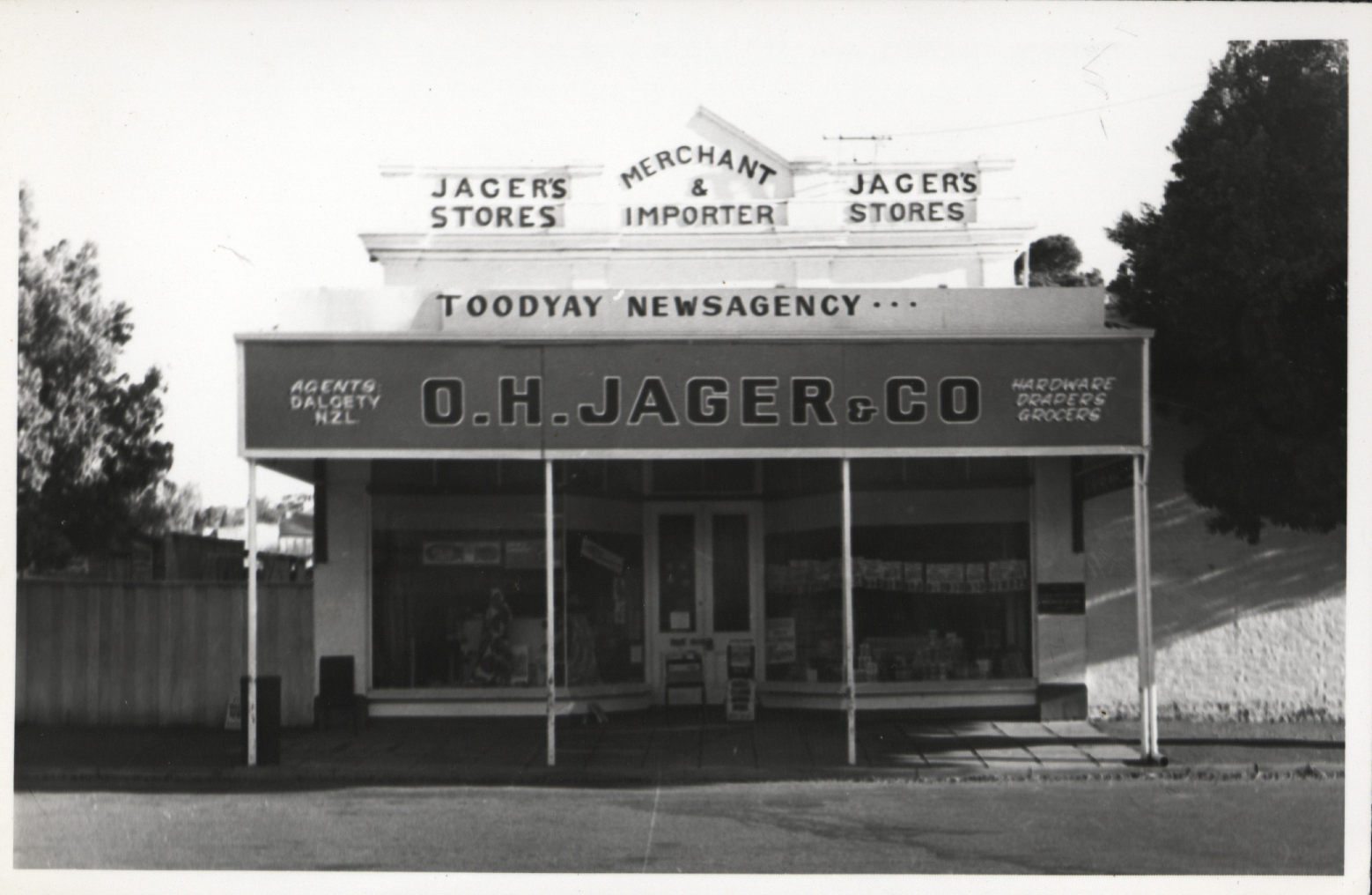
Jager's Store

Jager assumed ownership of the property in 1939, the premises becoming known as Jager's Store. In 1940 Jager had taken over the agency of the Shell Oil Company. In May 1946, during the Second World War, he made available a room adjoining his store for use by the Toodyay Voluntary Aid Detachment unit. In 1950 the Toodyay Newsagency was advertised as operating from this site. In the 1952 Toodyay Agricultural Show schedule of prizes two separate businesses were advertised, a newsagency and a general store. By 1956 each had separate telephone numbers.

1953 newspaper advertisements notified the public that Jager was the agent for Yeates and Yeates, Optometrists and Opticians of 44 St George's Terrace Perth, as well as being the sole district distributor of Electrolux appliances.

In 1956 Jager was notified by the Toodyay Road Board that his shop verandah was required to be modified due to road widening. The Road Board contributed to a quarter of the cost.

=== McKittrick's Toodyay General Store, 1969-1984 ===
On 1 December 1969 Maureen and Fred McKittrick took over the Toodyay General Store in the Jager building, running a supermarket, newsagency and Golden Fleece fuel agency from the site. Throughout the 1970s the business expanded, and in 1973 was advertised as a Safeway store. In June 1977 the original section of the building was granted a National Trust classification and in 1979 a new self-service grocery section was added.

=== Newtons’ Toodyay General Store, 1984-1990 ===
In July 1984 Allan and Karen Newton bought the Toodyay General Store. That year it was advertised as a Four Square store. In April 1986, during Heritage Week, a mural depicting 150 years of Toodyay's history was painted on a wall near the Toodyay General Store by students of Toodyay District High School. The project was under the direction of art teacher Joanne Bennett and sponsored by Allan Newton, owner of the store. In 1987 plans to double the capacity of the grocery self-service area and to incorporate a bull-nose verandah were announced.

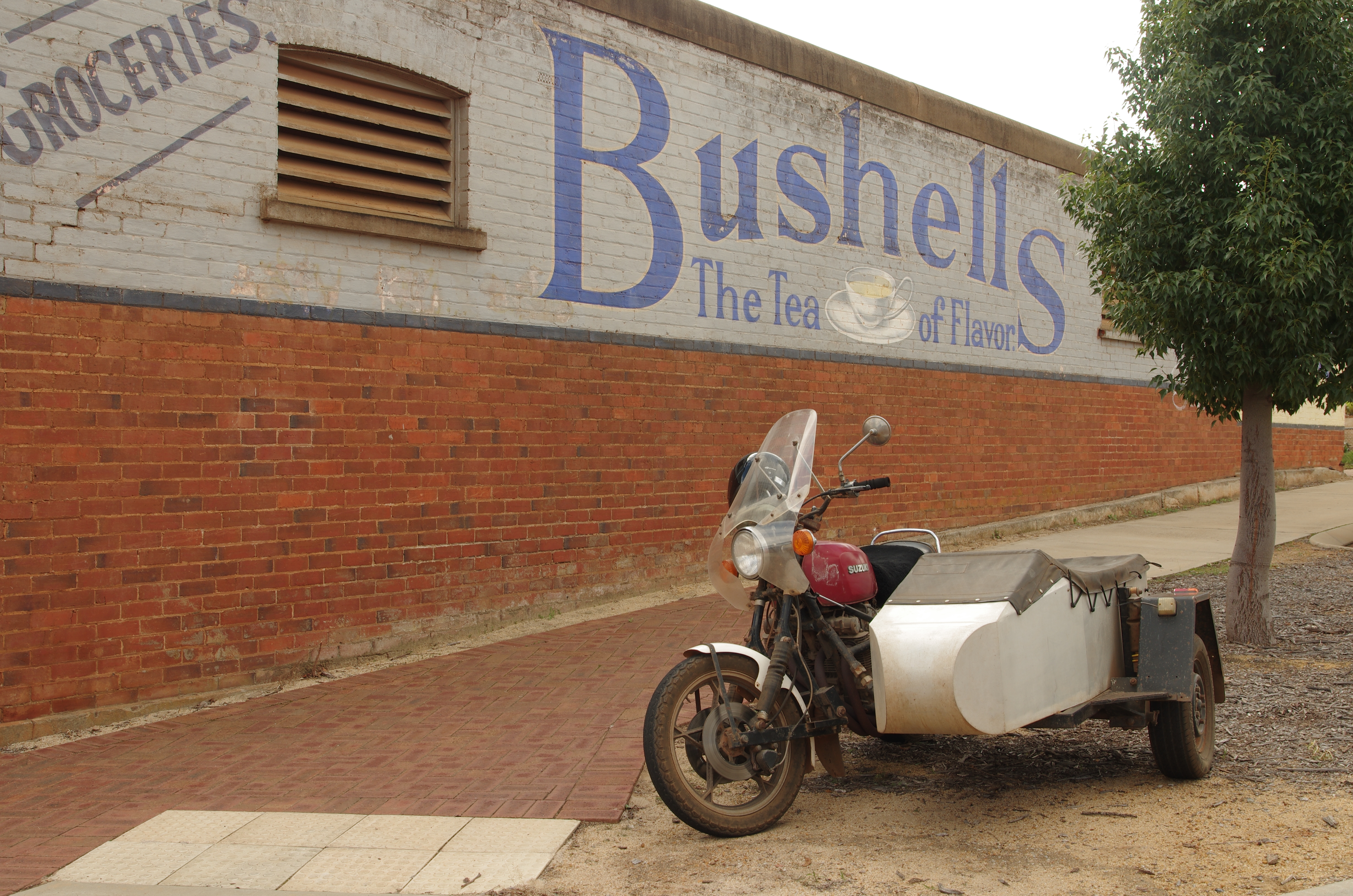
Bushells sign at Toodyay 2013

=== Dymonds’ Toodyay Supermarket, 1990-2002 ===
In May 1990 Richard and Karyn Dymond became the new owners of the Toodyay Supermarket, and by August 1990 it was trading as a Foodland supermarket. In August 1993 the Bushells sign at the back of the supermarket, facing Charcoal Lane, was repainted by Vic Grace from Toodyay Signs. One resident at the time recalled the original being first painted in the 1930s.

On 20 August 1996 the business moved into the electronic scanning era and boasted that the touch scanning system being used was the first of its kind in Western Australia. On 4 August 1997 the Toodyay Supermarket began trading 7 days a week.

=== Carter's Toodyay Supermarket, from 2002 ===
Around August 2002 Dean and Ruth Carter purchased the business and in March the following year advertised extended trading hours 7am to 7pm. Improvements continued to be made and, now trading as Supa-Value Toodyay, the premises saw the installation of new 8-metre upright freezers, a new veggie fresh area, and a new deli. Staff were issued with new uniforms.

In March 2011 the supermarket, trading as Toodyay IGA, moved away from the site to newly constructed premises on Charcoal Lane.

In July 2011 the newsagency moved to its new building next to the old Toodyay Fire Station on Stirling Terrace.

=== Richard's Christmas 360 Shop, from 2013 ===
In June 2013 Sean Byron's Richard's Christmas 360 shop was opened, initially trading Wednesdays to Sundays but expanding opening hours as Christmas approached. The Toodyay Community Singers sang carols for the occasion.

On 1 April 2014, after being closed for 3 months, Richard's Christmas 360 shop re-opened, the shop front of the business having expanded into the original Oddfellows' Hall section of the building.

== Description ==
It is a double height brick building with parapet emblazoned with "Jager Stores Merchant and Importers" in a classical style. The original façade has been obscured by a later extension of red brick and corrugated iron and a boxed style front verandah with metal posts and filligree brackets.
