= Shire of Toodyay =

Coordinates: 31°33′04″S 116°27′50″E

- Local government area
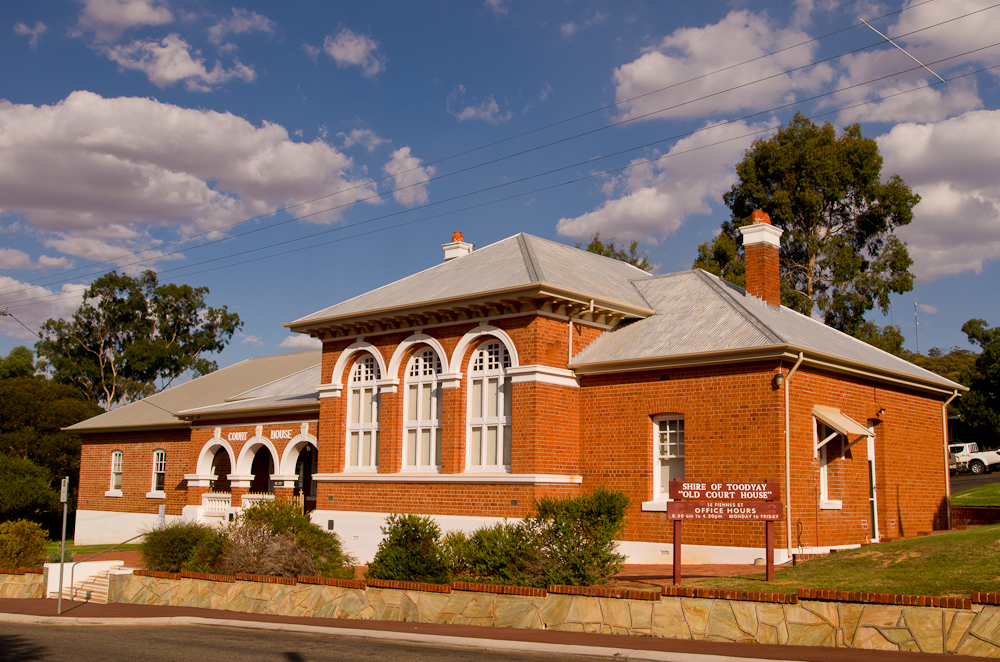
- The Toodyay Council offices

- Interactive map of Shire of Toodyay
- Country: Australia
- State: Western Australia
- Region: Wheatbelt
- Established: 1871
- Council seat: Toodyay

Government
  - Shire President: Michael McKeown
  - State electorate: Central Wheatbelt
  - Federal division: Bullwinkel

Area
  - Total: 1,693.8 km^{2} (654.0 sq mi)

Population
  - Total: 4,601 (LGA 2021)
- Website: Shire of Toodyay
LGAs around Shire of Toodyay
Chittering	Victoria Plains	Goomalling
Chittering	Shire of Toodyay	Goomalling
Swan	Mundaring	Northam

The Shire of Toodyay is a local government area in the Wheatbelt region of Western Australia, beyond the north-eastern limits of the Perth metropolitan area. The Shire covers an area of 1,694 square kilometres (654 sq mi), and its seat of government is the town of Toodyay.

== History ==
The Toodyay Road District was established on 24 January 1871. The Newcastle (later Toodyay) townsite separated as the Municipality of Newcastle on 2 October 1877. The municipality merged back into the road district on 8 March 1912. On 1 July 1961, Toodyay became a shire under the Local Government Act 1960, which reformed all remaining road districts into shires.

== Wards ==
The Shire has been divided into 4 wards, since the Toodyay Road board meeting in June 1904.

- North Ward (2 councillors)
- Central Ward (2 councillors)
- West Ward (3 councillors)
- East Ward (2 councillors)

== Towns and localities ==
The towns and localities of the Shire of Toodyay with population and size figures based on the most recent Australian census:

Locality	Population	Area	Map
Bejoording	157 (SAL 2021)	88.7 km^{2} (34.2 sq mi)	
Bindoon Defence Training Area	0 (SAL 2016)	137.4 km^{2} (53.1 sq mi)	
Coondle	664 (SAL 2021)	68 km^{2} (26 sq mi)	
Culham	26 (SAL 2021)	90.7 km^{2} (35.0 sq mi)	
Dewars Pool	82 (SAL 2021)	86.7 km^{2} (33.5 sq mi)	
Dumbarton	266 (SAL 2021)	71.7 km^{2} (27.7 sq mi)	
Hoddys Well	140 (SAL 2021)	76.9 km^{2} (29.7 sq mi)	
Julimar	406 (SAL 2021)	343.5 km^{2} (132.6 sq mi)	
Moondyne	0 (SAL 2021)	94.5 km^{2} (36.5 sq mi)	
Morangup	751 (SAL 2021)	202.9 km^{2} (78.3 sq mi)	
Nunile	183 (SAL 2021)	118.1 km^{2} (45.6 sq mi)	
Toodyay	1,362 (SAL 2021)	62.4 km^{2} (24.1 sq mi)	
Wattening	61 (SAL 2021)	190.6 km^{2} (73.6 sq mi)	
West Toodyay	497 (SAL 2021)	59.7 km^{2} (23.1 sq mi)	

== Population ==
Historical population

Year	Pop.	±% p.a.
1911	1,480	—
1921	1,545	+0.43%
1933	1,462	−0.46%
1947	1,237	−1.19%
1954	1,525	+3.04%
1961	1,369	−1.53%
1966	1,388	+0.28%
1971	1,725	+4.44%
1976	1,138	−7.98%

Year	Pop.	±% p.a.
1981	1,450	+4.97%
1986	1,831	+4.78%
1991	2,451	+6.01%
1996	3,186	+5.39%
2001	3,744	+3.28%
2006	4,112	+1.89%
2011	4,387	+1.30%
2016	4,439	+0.24%
2021	4,601	+0.72%

== Heritage-listed places ==
As of 2023, 173 places are heritage-listed in the Shire of Toodyay, of which 16 are on the State Register of Heritage Places.

== See also ==
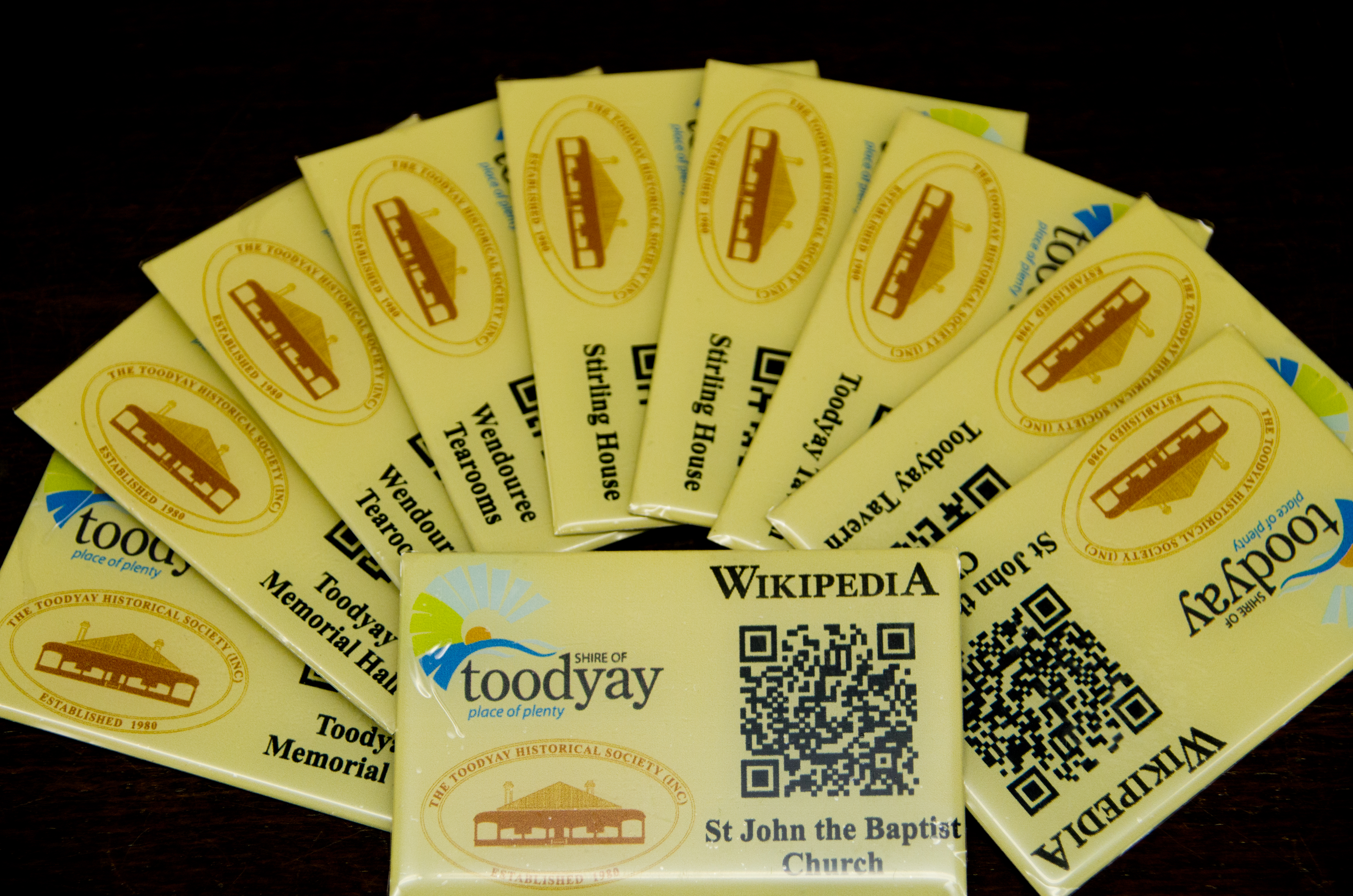
Toodyaypedia plates ready for installation in Toodyay

- Wikipedia:WikiTown/Toodyaypedia
