= Roman Catholic Church Group, Toodyay =

Buildings in Toodyay, Western Australia

Roman Catholic Church Group
- Interactive map of the Roman Catholic Church Group area

General information
- Location: Stirling Terrace, Toodyay, Australia
- Coordinates: 31.555°S 116.475°E
- Completed: 1863–64, 1884, 1903, 1920, 1923, 1929, 1963

Western Australia Heritage Register
- Type: State Registered Place
- Designated: 26 August 2019
- Reference no.: 4125

References
- Toodyay municipal inventory

The Roman Catholic Church Group, Toodyay is a site on Stirling Terrace in Toodyay, Western Australia, owned by the Catholic Church. This site was registered as Roman Catholic land in November 1861 in the newly proclaimed Avon District town of Newcastle (now known as Toodyay). These buildings were erected here between the early 1860s and 1963:

- The original St John the Baptist Church, built in 1863, closed 1963. (The original church was later sold and is now privately owned.)
- Dr Growse's House, built early 1860s
- St Aloysius Convent of Mercy, built in 1903
- St Aloysius Convent of Mercy School Classrooms and Boys Boarding House, built in 1920
- Catholic Presbytery, built in 1923
- St Aloysius Convent of Mercy School Classrooms and Girls Boarding House, built in 1929
- The current St John the Baptist Church, built in 1963

== History ==
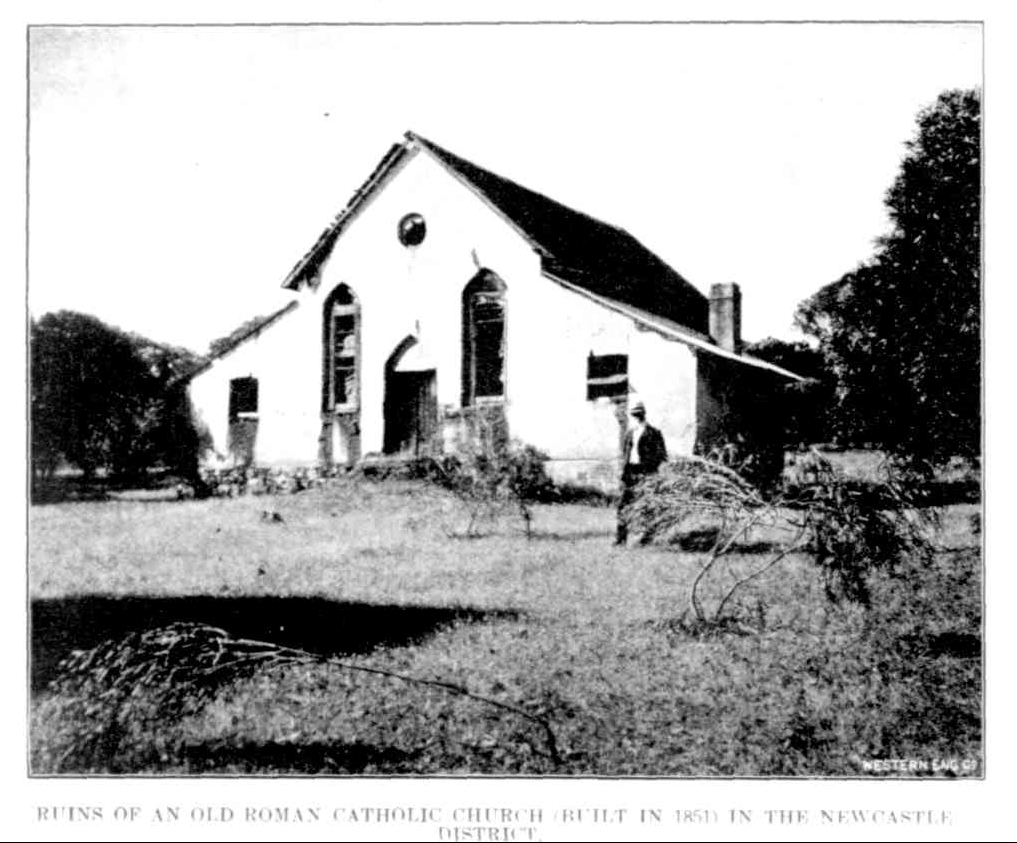
Ruins of Sancta Maria in Old Toodyay circa 1909

In 1855 Bishop Rosendo Salvado visited the Toodyay district to establish a Catholic parish in the area, appointing Canon Raphael Martelli as the parish priest. Construction of a church in Old Toodyay commenced using voluntary labour in 1856. The foundation stone was laid in 1857 and the building was completed in 1858, with the Church of Sancta Maria being blessed in January 1859. In 1860 the town of Newcastle was proclaimed, to relocate Old Toodyay from its flood prone area.

Father Francis Salvado called for tenders to build a new church in Newcastle in 1862; the original St John the Baptist Church was blessed in time for Christmas 1864. By 1874 an unofficial Catholic school for 30 or more children was also being conducted in a room at the rear of the church. In 1884 three Sisters of Mercy came from Perth to take on the responsibility of educating the local Catholic children. They established a temporary convent in the upper section of Mr. & Mrs. Hassell's home in Folewood Road. Three months later, with only limited funds and equipment, they opened a school in Leeder's House, previously owned by William Leeder. In 1889 the former residence of Dr Growse was sold to the Roman Catholic Bishop of Perth for use by the sisters as a seminary. (Growse's house was on the opposite side of the road to St John the Baptist Church.) The Sisters were able to purchase the building in their own right in 1902, at which time they vacated the Leeder property. The Sisters of Mercy were assisted by substantial endowments from the Connor family as they continued their work in the community. In 1903 their first project, a two-storey convent and school, was completed. The Sisters continued to use the Growse building, in later years as an infant school and for music classrooms. The St Aloysius Convent of Mercy school expanded with the construction of the double storey boy's boarding house in 1920. In 1923 a modern presbytery was built for the parish priest across the road from the church on an adjoining block to the school buildings. The location of the earlier Catholic presbytery is unknown. In 1929 the new single storey girl's boarding house was officially opened.

Advertisements in The West Australian newspaper and the Toodyay Herald in January and February 1942 mentioned the school as Avondown High School, near Toodyay.

In 1956 there was a call by Redmond Prendiville, the Catholic Archbishop of Perth, to build a more modern church, and over the next 5½ years fundraising was ongoing. In 1963 the new St John the Baptist Church was constructed in the Convent of Mercy precinct. On the morning of 17 November 1963 a last Mass and Communion were celebrated in the old church by the Auxiliary Bishop of Perth, Miles McKeon. A civic luncheon reception was given to the Bishop by the Toodyay Shire Council and in the afternoon the new church across the road was blessed and opened. Costs for the new church were about £9,400.

On 3 December 1971 Lancelot Goody, Archbishop of Perth, wrote to the Sisters of Mercy in Toodyay advising of St Aloysius Convent School's imminent closure. In early 1972 the Sisters of Mercy Avondown Complex in Toodyay was duly closed. The Sisters carried on their pastoral work (bush schools, motor missions and town parishioner work) until 1974. From 1973 to 1983 the Sisters ran educational camps in the Avondown Centre.

In 1985 the Catholic Education Commission took over the site. On 6 January 1985 four Sisters of Mercy (Sisters Claver, Conleth, Bernadette and Nance) left Toodyay leaving only two in residence (Justina and Finton).

In 1986 the Catholic Education Commission announced plans to continue to run the Avondale Centre as a social and educational group campsite. Dormitories were to be redesigned into small 6-8 bed sleeping units, a former house was to be renovated, and ground improvements were to be made. In 1995 the Avondown Centre ceased operation and was used for a brief period as a function centre.

In January 1999 Avondown became a friary for the Franciscan Friars of the Immaculate Marian Friary of Our Lady Help of Christians. In June 2003 the Sisters of Mercy left Toodyay, having had a presence there for 119 years. On 16 November in that same year the Friars sponsored a reunion of past students of the St Aloysius School to celebrate the 100th anniversary of its opening in 1903.

== Heritage listing ==
The site was classified by the National Trust in 1977.

== See also ==
- Angela Browne (nun)
