= Doris Durlacher =

Australian midwife (1870–1942)

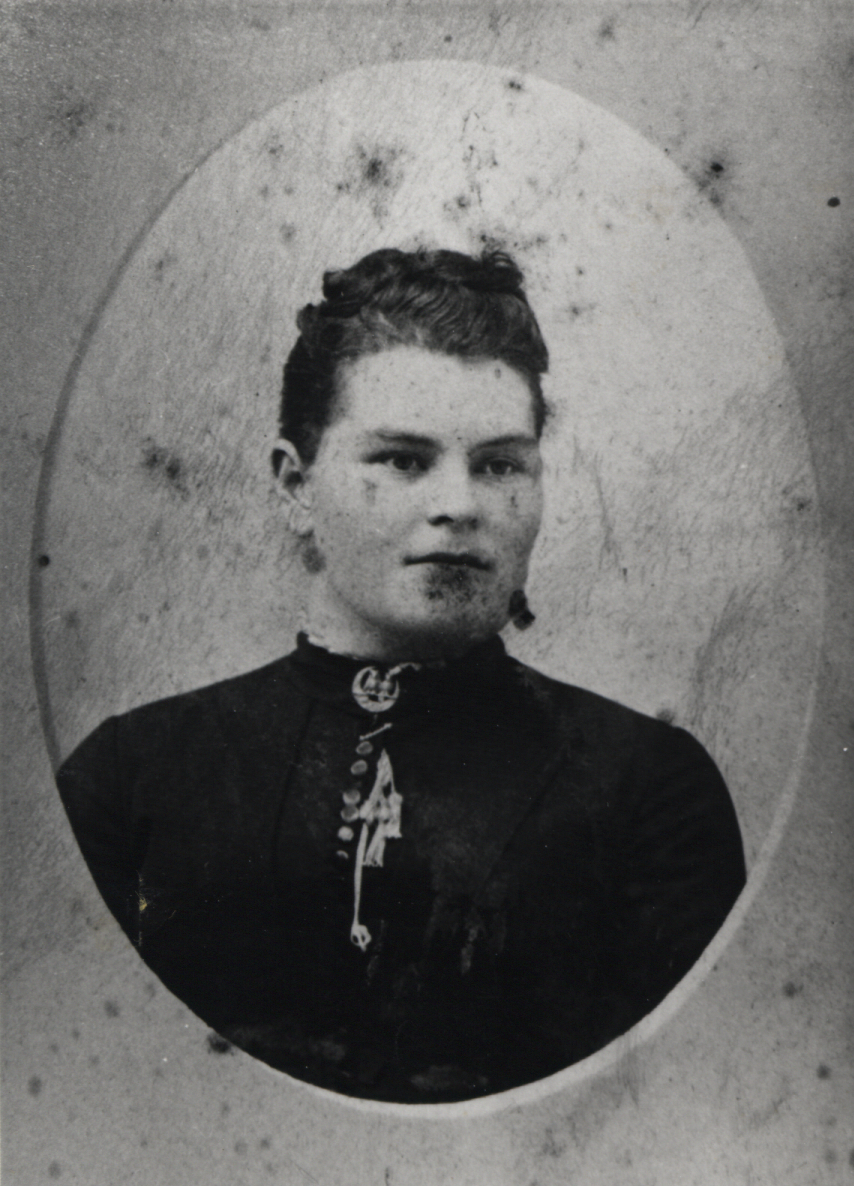
- Born: 14 March 1870
- Died: 1942 (aged 71–72)
- Occupation: Midwife

Miriam Dorothy Durlacher, more commonly known as Doris Durlacher, (1870–1942) was a nurse and midwife in Toodyay, Western Australia.

== Early life ==
Durlacher was born on 14 March 1870 at White Peak Station near Geraldton, to Deborah Wilberforce Durlacher (the daughter of Michael Clarkson). Doris's father, Alfred Durlacher, had committed suicide four months earlier.

After Durlacher's birth, the family moved to Toodyay to stay with relatives, before moving to Fremantle, where she attended school. After some years living in Fremantle the family moved to Perth where, after finishing her education, Durlacher opened a school for young children in Adelaide Terrace.

== Career ==
During the first decade of the 20th century, Durlacher returned with her mother to Newcastle, where she worked as a nurse. She is listed as Nurse Durlacher for the first time in the 1908 Newcastle Post Office directory.

In 1905 Nurse Despard, who had trained in Melbourne, opened a maternity hospital in Newcastle in Leeder's House in Stirling Terrace. The Sisters of Mercy had vacated the house when they moved into the newly built convent on the outskirts of town. A maternity hospital was unusual for those times; the practice was for home births assisted by a midwife. The passing of the Health Act in 1911 required midwives to be registered. By 1913, Durlacher was one of a number of women to appear on the first Register of Midwives in Western Australia.

In January 1925, Durlacher resigned from the hospital to take up private nursing.

During her career, Durlacher delivered 190 babies, and only lost one. She was held in high esteem for her commitment to her profession and her compassion for those she helped. Following her death in May 1942, the following appraisal was published in the Western Mail:

Her experiences in outback homes were amusing, pathetic, hard, and demanded great resourcefulness. Sometimes there was no bed for her and she just slept anywhere she could. Often in addition to nursing her patient and the newborn babe, she had to cook, wash and do the house, and look after the other children and the husband. No wonder these women who had their children in most primitive surroundings worshipped and loved Nurse Durlacher. She was a real guardian angel in their homes, and she often took such cases at very small remuneration.

== Later life ==
Around 1930 Durlacher retired. She was also a needlewoman; making no less than 57 cloths of various kinds.

She became an active member of the Karrakatta Club serving for some years on the executive committee. She also had a keen interest in the Girls' Friendly Society, a philanthropic body originally established in England to assist working-class women and girls with out-of-wedlock pregnancies.

Durlacher died on 10 May 1942 in Perth, after a long illness.
