= David Gailey =

Guard and settler of Western Australia

David Gailey (1807–1881) was one of a number of Enrolled Pensioner Guards (EPGs) who came to colonial Western Australia between 1850 and 1868. Their role was to guard and oversee the work of the prisoners transported to Western Australia.

== Early life and career ==
In common with many of the EPGs, Gailey was Irish and Catholic. He was born in Old Ross County in Watford in 1807. In December 1825, at the age of 18 years, he enlisted in the British Army, serving as a private in the 18th Regiment. He served for 20 years and was discharged in September 1846. He was 39 years of age. His record indicates he was awarded three good conduct badges. He was described as 174 centimetres (5 ft 8.5 in) in height, with a fair complexion, grey eyes and dark hair.

== Family ==
He married Margaret Hannen and in 1849 they had a son named John. In 1851 Gailey and his family travelled with a number of other EPGs to the settlement of Toodyay, where they were temporarily housed in A-framed straw huts at the first Toodyay Convict Hiring Depot and Pensioner Guard Barracks, and allotted 2-hectare (5-acre) plots of land. These allotments were later transferred to the permanent Convict Hiring Depot, 3 kilometres (1.9 mi) upstream of the town. Thirteen allotments, S1 to S13, were marked out, and from 1852 to 1856 two-roomed brick cottages were erected.

The Gaileys, whose family had increased with the birth of two daughters, Anna in 1851 and Ellen in 1856, were allocated one of the first three cottages to be completed. The depot became known as the Pensioner Village. Canon Raffaele Martelli, who had been appointed in 1855 by Bishop Salvado to look after Toodyay’s Catholic community, occupied one of the cottages for a short time.

== Residence ==
When more EPG families arrived at the depot, Martelli had to vacate the cottage and return to the townsite, where he was offered Gailey’s straw hut as temporary quarters. Martelli kept regular correspondence with Salvado and in one letter he thanks the bishop for sending a jar of butter that he wanted to give to Gailey. Martelli’s correspondence reveals a high regard for Gailey.

Now I find myself, as I mentioned in my other letter to you, living in the straw hut of this excellent man Mr Gailey. I am reasonably comfortable there…. [two months later] ‘I received some plants and herbs which I gave as a present to Mr Gailey.

In 1858, Gailey and many other EPGs in the colony contributed to the Indian Relief Fund that had been set up in England following the Indian Mutiny of 1857. Many of the EPGs had served in India with the British Army before their retirement. The mutiny led to the ending of the East India Company in 1858, and the establishment of the British Raj.

In 1860 the new town of Newcastle, located around the Convict Hiring Depot, had been surveyed. Gailey was allocated Lot S7 of 1.6 hectares (4 acres), and purchased Lot 17 consisting of 2.4 hectares (6 acres). This lot was located across the road from what became the Sisters of Mercy Convent, and at the southern end of Lot 17, the Roman Catholic St John the Baptist church was erected in 1863. Possibly around the same time a Catholic Presbytery (Note: Not the current Catholic Presbytery, Toodyay, completed in 1923.) was built across the road from the church on Lot S19.

During the 1860s Gailey employed four ticket-of-leave men, conducted a small school, and worked as a bootmaker. He offered to take in the Quinlan children, Timothy (born February 1861) and his sister Mary when their mother died while giving birth to twins. Their father was up north with a government party at the time. When their father also died the children were placed with Joseph Thomas Reilly, a prominent Catholic newspaperman and active citizen, who raised them with his own children. Timothy Quinlan went on to become a prominent politician and husband to Daniel Connor's daughter Teresa.

== Death ==
Gailey continued to be a resident in Toodyay, dying on 18 April 1881.

== General references ==
- Erickson, Rica (1988). Erickson, Frederica Lucy (ed.). Bicentennial Dictionary of Western Australians: Pre-1829 – 1888. Vol. 2 D–J. Nedlands: UWA Publishing (published 1987). p. 1137. ISBN 0-85564-273-4. LCCN 88151753. OCLC 19221630. OL 2102384M. Wikidata Q115122719.
- Cromb, Alison, The History of the Toodyay Convict Depot. A tale of the convict era of Western Australia, published by Alison Cromb, Dianella, 2010.
- Erickson, Rica (1974). Old Toodyay and Newcastle. Toodyay Shire Council. ISBN 0959831509.
- Kinder, John J., and Brown, Joshua, Canon Raffaele Martelli in Western Australia. Life and Letters, Abbey Press. 2014.

This article incorporates text by Robyn Taylor available under the CC BY SA 2.5 AU licence.
