= Catholic Presbytery, Toodyay =

Building in Toodyay, Western Australia

Catholic Presbytery (fmr), Toodyay
- The Catholic Presbytery in November 2026
- Alternative names: Earth Craft Nursery

General information
- Architectural style: Federation Bungalow
- Location: 32 Stirling Terrace, Toodyay
- Coordinates: 31.55504°S 116.47526°E
- Completed: 1923

References
- Toodyay municipal inventory

The Catholic Presbytery, Toodyay is a former clergy house situated on Stirling Terrace in Toodyay, Western Australia.

The place was built to accommodate the resident priest at the St John the Baptist Church, Toodyay and has also been used as an education centre. In 1923 the building was officially opened in front of a large crowd by Patrick Clune, Lord Archbishop of Perth. Showers of rain spoiled the occasion, the guests having to crowd onto the verandah. Mr. and Mrs. B.M. Connor's good work on behalf of the church and convent was noted. The presbytery cost £1,300 to build, and was fitted with sewerage and other modern conveniences. The first resident priest was the Rev Father McBride.

In c. 1949 Father Nolan was in residence. In 1954 Father O'Reilly was the host at the house for a card evening, where bridge and rummy were played and supper was served.

The building was still owned by the Roman Catholic Church in 1975 when a survey was conducted by Ian Chitty for the Shire of Toodyay. A contemporary photograph in Chitty's report shows the building before the present Toodyay Stone wall, now at the front of the block, was erected.

The former presbytery is part of the historic Catholic Precinct, Toodyay that also includes the St Aloysius Convent of Mercy school buildings. It is located near the present St John the Baptist Church. By December 1998 it had been sold by the Catholic Church and is now privately owned.

The building is a single storey brick residence with a green corrugated iron roof and verandah. There are twin French doors facing Stirling Terrace.
