= Angela Browne (nun) =

Australian Sister of Mercy (born 1884)

- Born: 1884; County Cork
- Occupation: religious sister

Angela Browne was born in County Cork, Ireland in 1884. She would later become Mother Superior at the Sisters of Mercy Convent in Toodyay, Western Australia.

== Sisters of Mercy ==
In 1884, the first Sisters of Mercy came to Toodyay to open a convent school for girls. They bought the house of former Mayor W G Leeder at No. 94 Stirling Terrace, which was ideally situated in the centre of town with a frontage to the main street. The Sister took over the education of the pupils who were being taught in a room at the back of St John the Baptist Church and contacted Catholic families in the wider district who had school age children.

A major benefactor to the Sisters of Mercy was the Connor (O’Connor (Note: The name O’Connor was also used by the Connor family)) family. Daniel Connor, an Irish Catholic, had been a former convict who came to Toodyay as an itinerant peddler. When the new town of Newcastle was established in 1860 he set up a store, and built up a personal fortune through acquiring properties and businesses. He became one of the biggest landowners in central Perth. The Connor family remained supporters of the Sisters of Mercy, and the Catholic Church in Toodyay, for many decades.

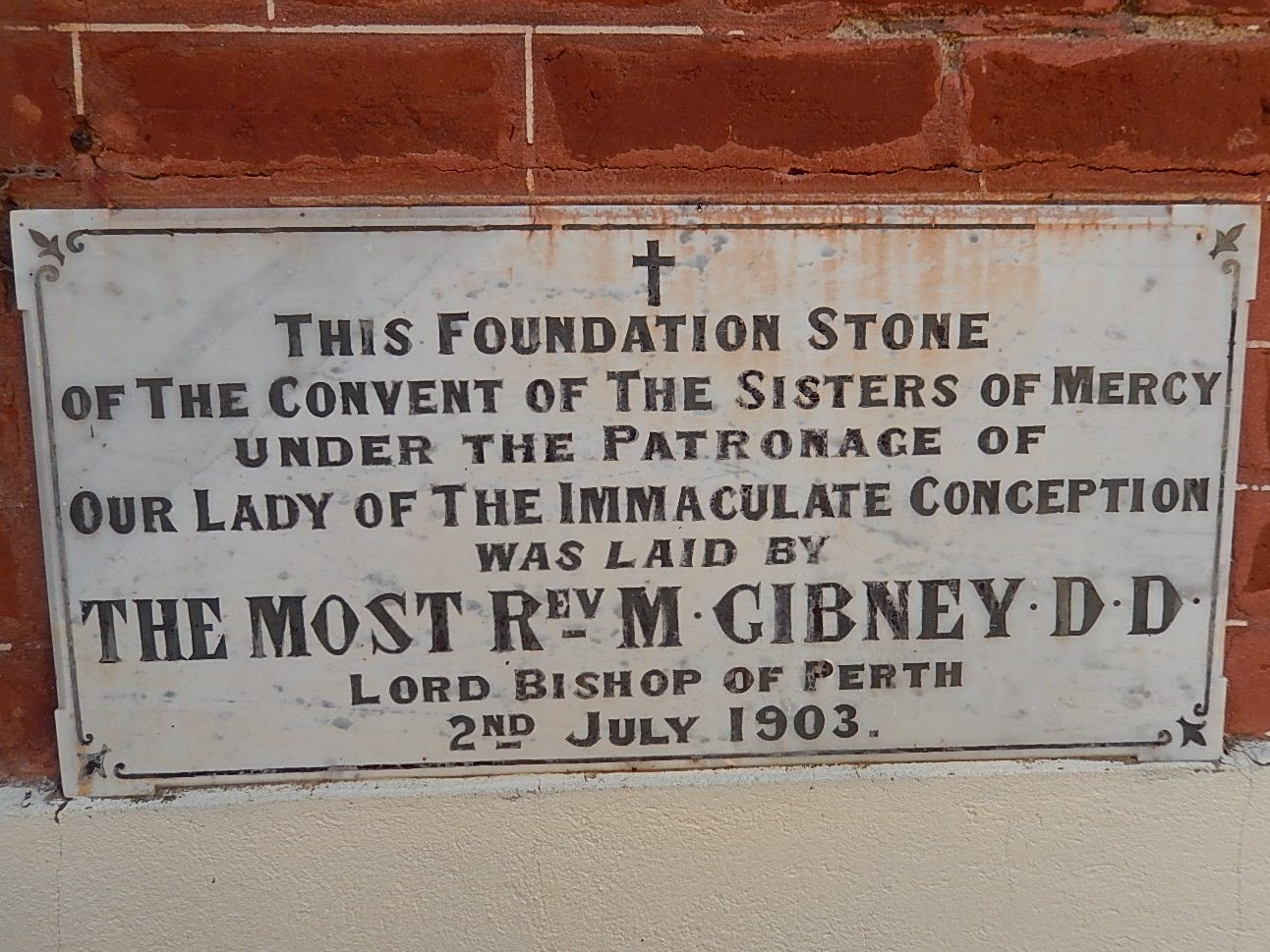
Foundation stone

The Sisters admitted boarders to their Convent but numbers had to be limited for want of space. They needed to expand. With the assistance from the Connor family land was purchased and in 1903 the foundation stone was laid for a new two-storey Convent building called Mercy House. This was located at the far end of town opposite St John the Baptist Church. The Sisters had also acquired the two storey former doctor's residence (‘The Ship’, 1860s) on an adjoining block. It was not long before both buildings were full to capacity.

In 1921 the Mother Superior Sister Angela Browne wrote, ‘for the past few years requests for admission have exceeded the accommodation...’ The Convent's reputation was such that parents from Perth and as far away as Albany and the North-West were wanting to send their children there. The Convent school, which became known as ‘Avondown’, provided for boys as well as girls. Funds needed to be raised, not only for new buildings but also the ongoing maintenance of the existing buildings. Sister Angela had the entrepreneurial flair to achieve this.

Sister Margaret Mary Browne from County Cork had been with the Convent in Newcastle (Toodyay) since 1901. She was professed as Sister Alacoque, then, when the Convent was amalgamated with the Victoria Square Convent in Perth, she changed her name to Sister Angela. According to Anne McLay who wrote the history of the Sisters of Mercy in Western Australia.

She was a masterful woman and a great friend of the Connor family. For her silver jubilee they constructed a wing to the church across the road for the use of the sisters and boarders. Under her leadership ‘Avondown’, Toodyay, acquired style and class. Yet she did not hesitate to ply a spade, hammer, or paint brush.

To help with their extensive building programme the Convent raised funds from the sale of cows and calves, held euchre parties, and organised concerts. In 1928 another building, O’Connor House, was erected to provide extra dormitories and a recreation room for the female pupils. Once a year this building was used for the popular Spring Ball, which attracted people from far and wide. A description of one ball held in 1938 suggests Sister Angela and her team were not only imaginative but knew how to throw a great party.

The spacious school buildings in the picturesque convent grounds made a charming setting for the ball. Both the dance hall and supper room were effectively decorated, the ballroom scene depicting an unusual and brilliantly conceived solar system with a large golden sun radiating light and shining through rain on to a rainbow, while at the far end of the room the moon and stars were outstanding features of the picture presented.

Over 400 people danced to bright music supplied by Miss M. Willoughby's orchestra, and an excellent supper was served.

An equally successful children's ball took place the following evening.

In particular, it was Sister Angela's personality and exploits that people remembered. She was known to shoot rabbits and kangaroos from the Convent balcony, probably because they were grazing on the vegetable patch, and to have thrown stones onto the tin roof of the nearby presbytery because she was annoyed with the parish priest who lived there. She also wore a wristwatch, which was unusual for nuns at that time. Sister Angela was nicknamed the ‘Mayoress of Toodyay’, and curiously described as ‘a character out of Dickens’.

== Notes ==
=== Additional sourcing ===
- McLay, Anne, Women out of their Sphere. The history of the Sisters of Mercy in Western Australia from 1846, Vanguard Press, Northbridge, 1992
- Erickson, Rica, Old Toodyay and Newcastle, Toodyay Shire Council, 1974.
- Western Mail, 15 September 1938, p. 29.
- Database of nuns and sisters of the Catholic Church in Australia (Record #5582, or search for date of birth "84/03/31")
