= Newcastle Hospital =

Former hospital in Toodyay, Western Australia

Newcastle Hospital (fmr)
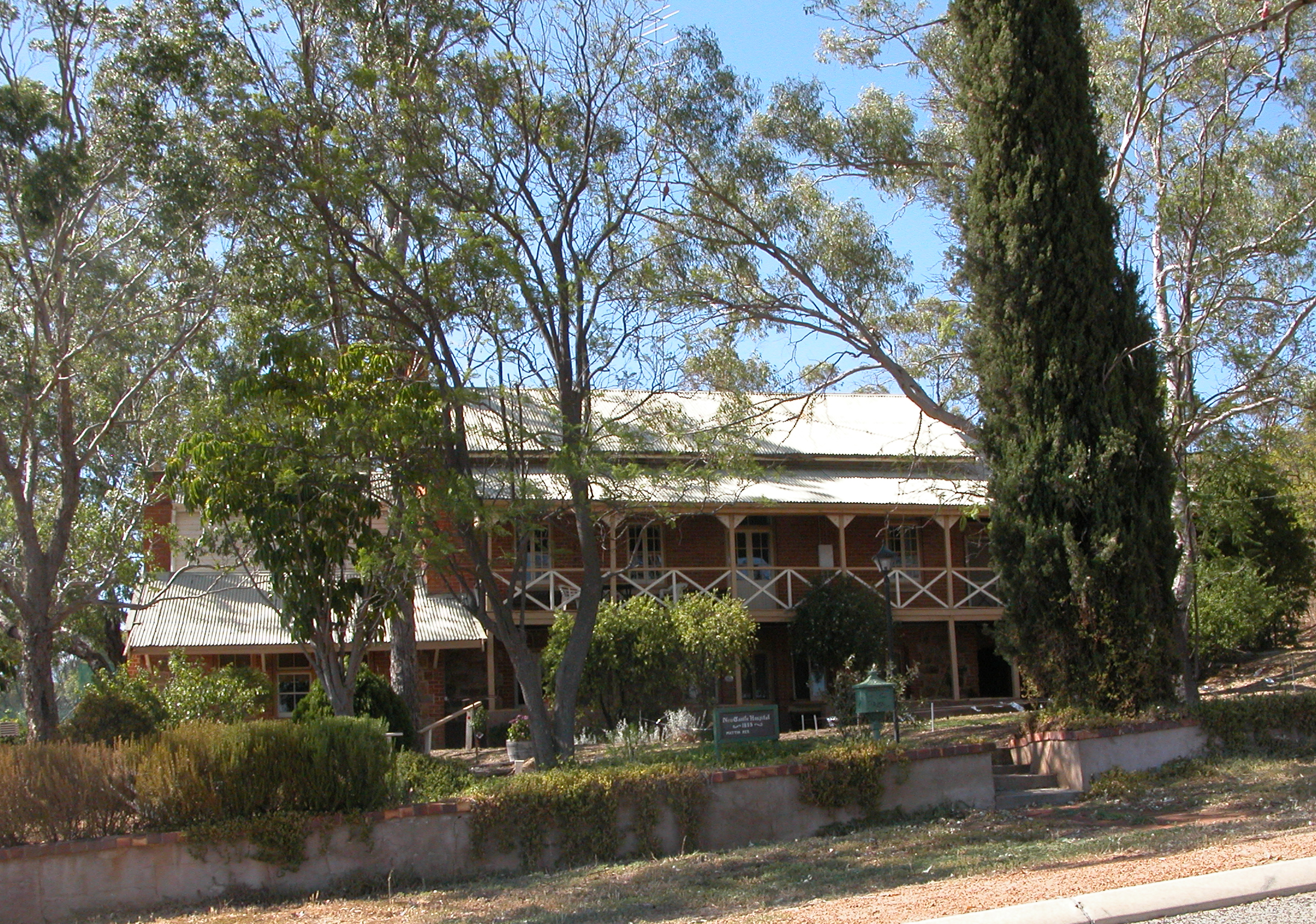
- Newcastle Hospital
- Interactive map of the Newcastle Hospital (fmr) area
- Alternative names: Toodyay Hospital, Toodyay Public Hospital

General information
- Architectural style: Victorian Homestead
- Location: 7 Henry Street West, Toodyay, Australia
- Coordinates: 31°33′17″S 116°28′14″E
- Construction started: 1892; 134 years ago
- Completed: 1894; 132 years ago

Design and construction
- Main contractor: Wroth & Lloyd

Newcastle Hospital in Toodyay, Western Australia was completed in 1894 and was the only purpose-built hospital for the town then known as Newcastle. It ceased operating as a hospital in 1940.

== History ==
Construction of this building commenced in 1892 but work stopped before being resumed again in the same year it was completed. The Newcastle Hospital replaced the original public health facility operating out of the 1854 Toodyay Convict Depot infirmary building. In 1896 the new local court house was erected adjacent to the old infirmary.

In 1901 the cost of running the hospital was investigated by Thomas Henry Lovegrove in his role as Principal Medical Officer for Western Australia and president of the Central Board of Health. The doctor's salary with house, an orderly's salary and the maintenance of patients (including drugs) were estimated at nearly £300 per year, equivalent to A$51,680 in 2022. Only 17 patients were treated in 1901–1902. Seriously ill patients were usually taken to Northam Hospital, which was much better equipped and only 27 kilometres (17 mi) away. Lovegrove concluded that building the hospital was premature and in 1902 it was closed, with the hospital staff being dismissed and most of the fittings and fixtures being sent to a new hospital in Katanning, Western Australia.

An epidemic of diphtheria flared up in the district in late 1906 and so in the following year a wing of the hospital reopened. In 1910 the state government and the Newcastle Road Board jointly took over the maintenance of the building, which remained operational as a hospital until 1940.
