= William Leeder =

William Leeder may refer to:

- William Henry Leeder, early settler in the Swan River Colony, Western Australia
- William George Leeder (1845–1906), his son, mayor of Newcastle, Western Australia
