= Church of Sancta Maria, Toodyay =

Church in original Toodyay townsite

Church of Sancta Maria (former)
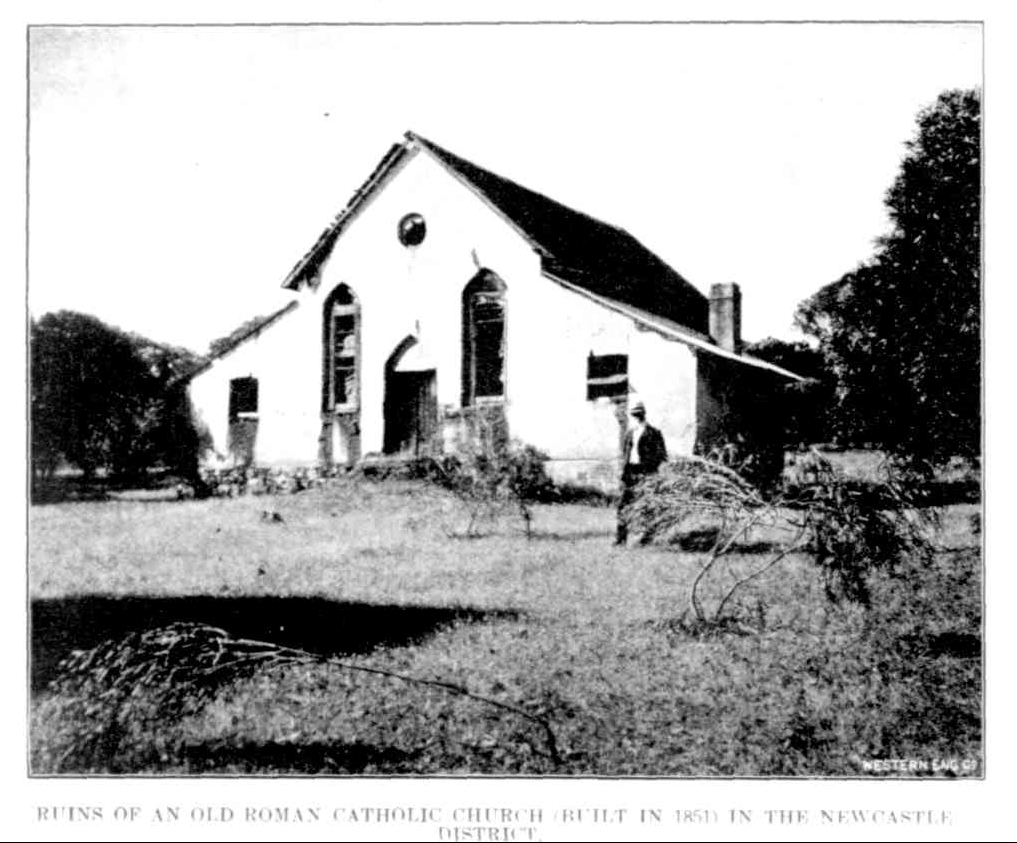
- Ruins of the Church of Sancta Maria, c. 1909
- Church of Sancta Maria (former)
- 31°31′28″S 116°25′53″E
- Address: Old Toodyay, Western Australia
- Country: Australia
- Previous denomination: Roman Catholic

History
- Status: Church (1857–c. 1867); School (1885–c. 1898); Residence (c. 1898–1907)
- Founded: 8 March 1857
- Founder: Canon Raphael Martelli
- Dedication: Mary, mother of Jesus
- Consecrated: January 1859 by Bishop Serra

Architecture
- Functional status: Abandoned
- Architectural type: Church
- Years built: 1857–1858
- Closed: c. 1867

Specifications
- Length: 8.5 metres (28 ft)
- Width: 6.4 metres (21 ft)
- Materials: Brick

The Church of Sancta Maria was the first Roman Catholic church built in the original townsite of Toodyay in Western Australia. It was consecrated in 1859, and served as church, priest's residence, and schoolhouse for the Toodyay Valley Catholic School. It later housed the Toodyay Valley government school.

== Background ==
The 1856 Census revealed a marked increase in the number of people living in Toodyay who were Catholic. Most of the recently arrived Enrolled Pensioner Guards and Irish immigrants were Catholics, as were other ticket-of-leave holders. In 1854, there were 263 Catholics in Toodyay, which amounted to almost thirty percent of its total population.

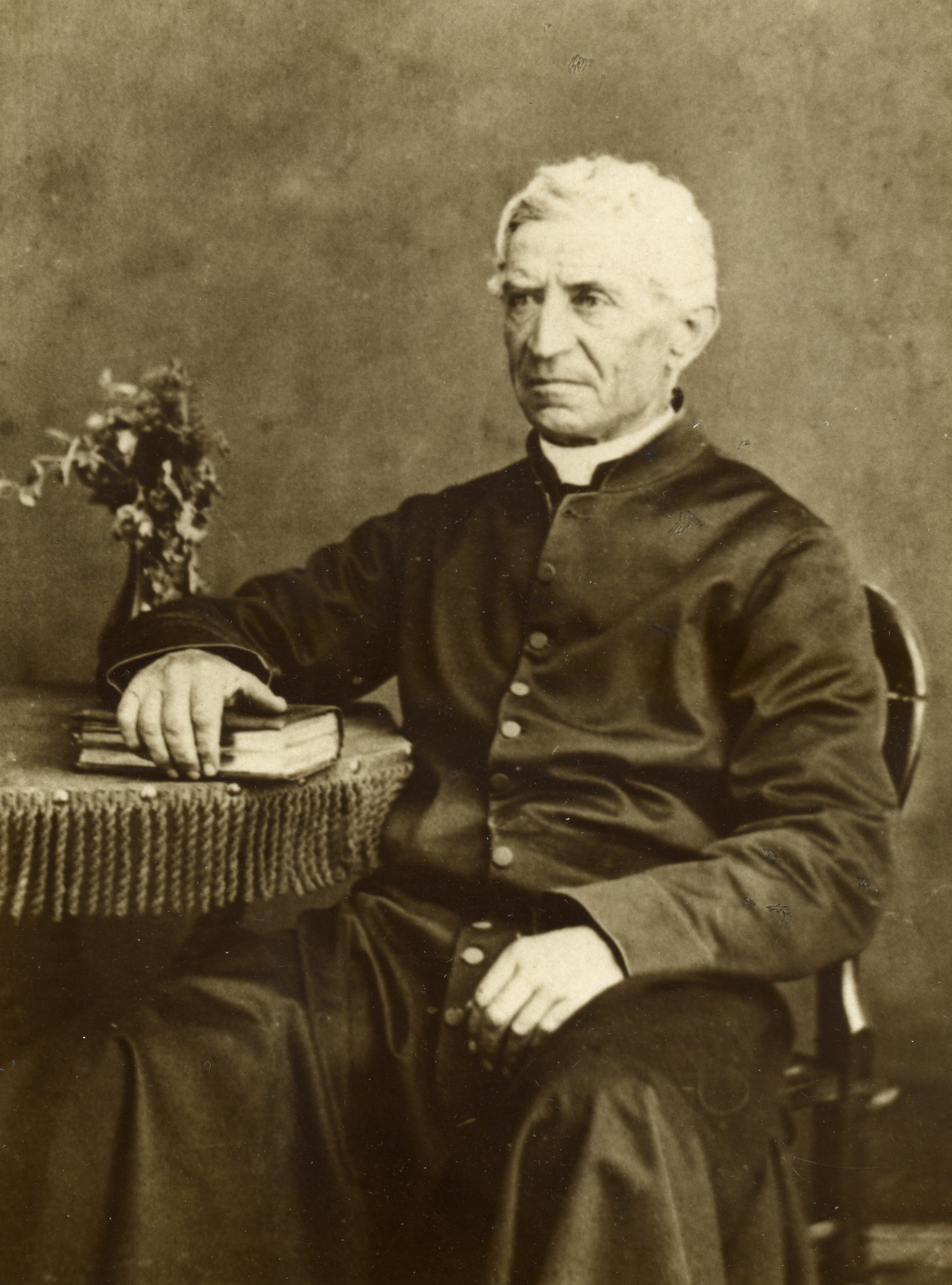
Raffaele Martelli

They had neither church nor chaplain, and Bishop Rosendo Salvado made it his business to move among the local people to serve their needs. He began organizing a parish in Toodyay and selected a site for its church. In November 1855, Canon Raphael Martelli was appointed the parish priest of both York and Toodyay. He would celebrate mass in Toodyay, Northam, York and Bindoon. He travelled everywhere on horse-back. The journeys were especially arduous in the cold, wet days of winter. Regular trips to New Norcia were very dear to his heart.

For a while, Martelli lived in an unfinished Pensioner Guard cottage next to the new Toodyay Convict Hiring Depot located upstream from the townsite. When, in May 1856, he was asked to vacate, he moved to an old straw hut belonging to young Pensioner Guard, David Gailey.

Martelli's stay in the straw hut was relatively short. He was given permission to occupy the old superintendent's office at the new site of the Toodyay Convict Hiring Depot. By August he had moved in. The wooden office was in a very poor state, without windows, no lock and its walls riddled with holes. Gusts of icy wind regularly blasted through. But for a blazing fire night and day, Martelli would not have survived the winter, when nightly temperatures hovered around 0 °C (32 °F). The raging waters of the Avon River often isolated Martelli from his parishioners at the Toodyay townsite.

On 8 June 1857, lots R51, R52 and R53 were registered on behalf of trustees for the Roman Catholic Church for the building of a Catholic school house, a priest's dwelling and a church. The church would stand on the corner of Charles St and River Terrace. On 8 June 1857, lot R67 was also registered on behalf of trustees for the Roman Catholic Church for use as a Catholic cemetery. The Cemetery was gazetted on 18 August 1857. All lots were situated in Charles St, which is now known as Picnic Hill Road.

== Construction and use as church and school ==
The foundation stone for the Church of Sancta Maria was laid on 8 March 1857, with a service witnessed with "the most heartfelt joy and sincere piety on the part of the faithful who flocked from every part of the district". For the parishioners had little means, and most of the building was being achieved through the efforts of voluntary labour. Built of brick, it measured 8.5 metres (28 ft) in length and 6.4 metres (21 ft) in width. It contained a fireplace. The church building also contained a small schoolroom and modest accommodation for the parish priest.

In February 1858, whilst negotiating the shingles for the roof, Martelli was called upon to return to Fremantle. He did not oversee the completion of the building at Toodyay.

By the end of 1858, building was complete. In January 1859, Bishop Serra performed the blessing of the Church of Sancta Maria. That year the church opened its doors to the Toodyay Valley Catholic School. Their teacher was Darby Connors, otherwise known as Jeremiah O'Connor. Darby Connors was an Enrolled Pensioner Guard whose records describe him as "exceedingly good". Aged 41 years, he was married with four children.

Connors had begun teaching children in a straw hut at the old Toodyay Pensioner Barracks. In 1855, he was required to take up his Pensioner allotment, lot S11, in Newcastle. In doing so, Connors reluctantly closed his school. He eagerly took up teaching once more when the Toodyay Valley Catholic School opened in 1859. He taught there until 1863.

== Transfer of the Catholic school to Newcastle ==
The floods of 1862 caused havoc in the district and the town of Toodyay was inundated yet again. By comparison, the newly established town of Newcastle remained comparatively undamaged, apart from the loss of its bridge. Soon, plans were afoot to build a new Catholic church in Newcastle, and in January 1863 the foundation stone was laid for St John the Baptist Church at Newcastle. Later, the Toodyay Valley Catholic School closed to reopen in Newcastle. The Church of Sancta Maria in Old Toodyay continued to serve the community until approximately 1867, after which it appears to have been no longer in use.

In early 1872, Martelli was appointed parish priest for the St John the Baptist Church. He served the community well and was greatly loved. In June 1880, he became unwell while at New Norcia, and he died on 3 August 1880.

== Toodyay Valley government school ==
In 1885, the Toodyay Valley government school reopened in the building of the Church of Sancta Maria, after a social revival in the old town of Toodyay brought more children to the area. Elizabeth McKnight and her sister taught there until October 1898.

Mary Ann Markey, a widow, made the old vacant church her home until her death, in 1907, at the age of 84 years. Thereafter, the church building fell into disrepair.
