= Anthony Lefroy =

Anthony Lefroy may refer to:

- Anthony Lefroy (Irish politician) (1800–1890), Irish politician, Member of Parliament for Longford
- Anthony O'Grady Lefroy (1816–1897), government official in Western Australia
