= Raffaele Martelli =

First Catholic priest of Toodyay, Western Australia

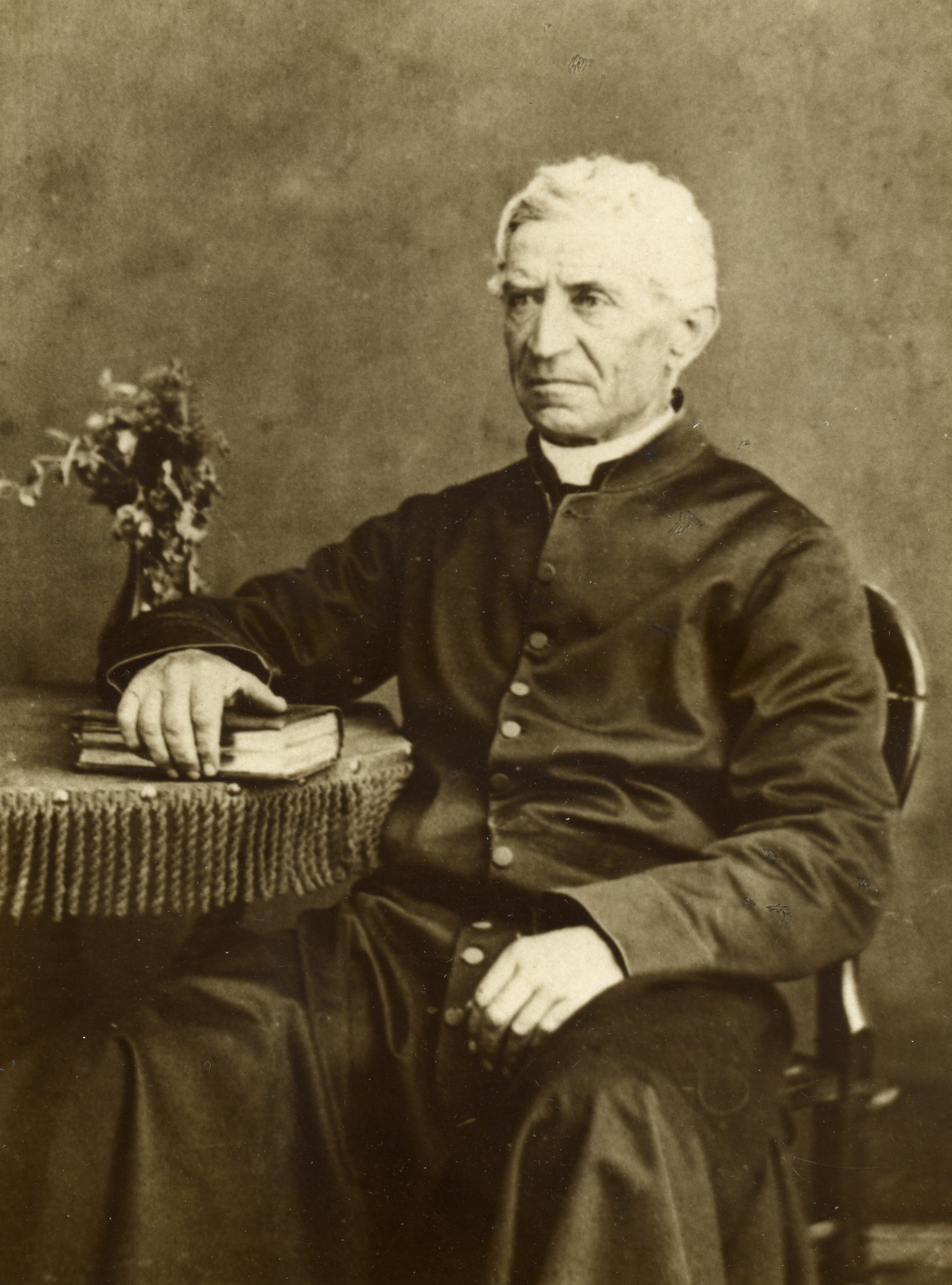
Raffaele Martelli

Canon Raffaele (Note: Sometimes Anglicised as Raphael) Martelli (13 March 1811 – August 1880) was an Italian-Australian priest. He was Toodyay's first Catholic priest. He was a scholarly and gentle man who was much loved by settlers of all faiths. Martelli did not keep a diary, but his personality and humour shine through his regular correspondence with his friend Bishop Rosendo Salvado of New Norcia. His letters from Toodyay reveal the day-to-day travails of a priest who started out with no house or church. He had to rely on the goodwill of his parishioners for a roof over his head and food on the table, while a pair of woollen winter socks from Salvado brought him untold joy.

== Early life ==
Martelli was born in Ancona, Italy, on 13 March 1811. His baptismal certificate gives his full name as Napoleone Raffaele Mariano Melchiorre. As a young boy, he was enrolled in the seminary of San Carlo in Ancona. He studied the humanities and learnt French and English, eventually acquiring fluency in several languages. In 1834, he was ordained a priest, then created a canon of the church of Santa Maria della Piazza. For a time, Martelli was also politically active as Italy was undergoing the upheavals of the Italian Risorgimento. However, this did not sit well with his priestly vocation, and he had to withdraw his involvement.

== Western Australia ==
Martelli’s path to Western Australia started with his appointment at the Monastery of Santa Scolastica in Subiaco, Italy, where he taught rhetoric. Monks were prepared for missionary work at the monastery, and soon after his arrival in 1851, the monastery was visited by Rosendo Salvado and Venancio Garrido, both of whom became dear friends. Salvado had travelled from Western Australia to seek funds from Rome and resources for his Benedictine monastery at New Norcia, where he planned to establish a mission for Aboriginals. Martelli wanted to join Salvado and sought letters of recommendation to this end. Abbot Angelo Pescetelli in Rome wrote:

Although he does not wear the habit he is Benedictine at heart. He is a distinguished professor of literature and Italy has applauded many of his publications … he is a priest of exemplary virtue, of firm will and capable of the most heroic sacrifices.

In April 1853, Martelli accompanied Salvado on the John Panter for the journey to Western Australia. There were two other priests and 39 monks on board. They arrived at Fremantle on 15 August 1853. The friendship between the two men enabled Martelli to leave behind everyone and everything he knew and loved for the unknown.

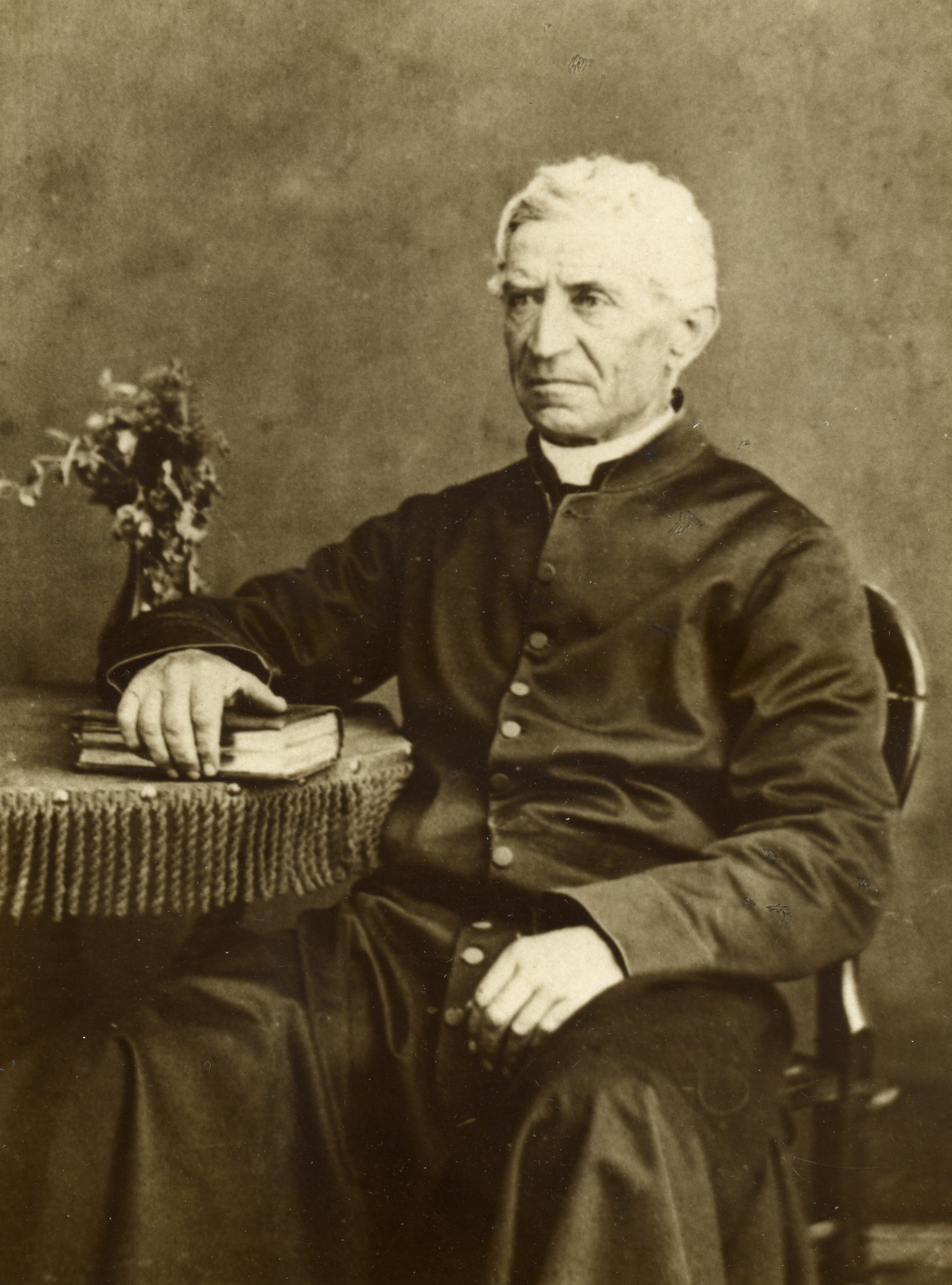
Photographic portrait of Martelli in later life.

Martelli worked in Fremantle before being appointed to Toodyay in 1856. Salvado had visited the town in 1855 and, with the assistance of a ticket-of-leave man, had marked out a site for a church and petitioned the governor for 10 acres of land. Although the number of Catholics in the region was relatively small, it had increased with the arrival of convicts and Enrolled Pensioner Guards (EPGs) and their families at the two rural convict hiring depots at York and Toodyay. At first, Martelli was allowed to use one of the new unfurnished EPG cottages built at the depot, now located upstream of the townsite. The Guards had been occupying A-frame straw huts at the first Toodyay Convict Hiring Depot and Pensioner Guard Barracks while the cottages were being constructed. When Martelli was instructed to vacate the cottage, he was offered EPG David Gailey's straw hut as temporary quarters. Gailey was an Irish Catholic and helped Martelli in various ways. Martelli reciprocated with small gifts such as a pot of butter that he asked Salvado to acquire for him. In one letter to Salvado, he wrote, "I received some plants and herbs which I gave as a present to Mr Gailey." His stay in the hut was short, and he had to move into a wooden shack by the river. During heavy flooding in July 1857, he found himself marooned in his "cheerless house" while floodwaters swirled around him. During these years, Martelli worked hard for his parishioners while trying to raise funds to build the church.

In September 1856, the Catholic Church had been granted Toodyay town lots 51, 52 and 53 for a schoolhouse, presbytery and church. The following year, a lot was secured for a cemetery. He requested assistance from the government, and by November 1856, with help from volunteers, the walls of the chapel had been erected, but the church needed a roof; lack of funds caused a lengthy delay.

In March 1858, he was transferred back to Fremantle to serve as chaplain to the Convict Establishment. For Martelli to work at the Establishment, he had to become a British subject and swear allegiance to the Crown; he thus became the first Italian in WA to be a naturalised British subject, although "matters of nationality or citizenship meant little to him". In January 1859, the Church of Sancta Maria in Toodyay was blessed by Bishop Joseph Serra. He also consecrated the original St Patrick's Church in York that Martelli had undertaken to build.

During his time at York and Toodyay, Martelli gained the respect of both Catholic and Protestant alike. He and the Reverend Charles Harper became firm friends at a time when religious intolerance was encountered all too often.

In 1868, after his time at the Establishment, followed by more years of work based in Fremantle, Martelli was given permission to "withdraw" to the monastery at New Norcia. He lived a very happy and active life there before Bishop Martin Griver transferred him back to Toodyay in 1872, where he again served the Avon Valley district. By then, the new town of Newcastle had been established at the depot, and a new St John the Baptist Church constructed, where Martelli conducted an unofficial school in a back room. Martelli remained in Toodyay until June 1880, when he retired to New Norcia, his "earthly paradise". He was already ill and died there on 3 August 1880; he was buried next to his friend Garrido.
