= Alfred Durlacher =

Australian civil servant

Alfred Durlacher (1818 – 1869) was the fifth resident magistrate to be appointed to Toodyay, Western Australia, serving between 1861 and 1865.

Durlacher was born on 30 May 1818. (Note: Some references list a birth year of 1828, but this is inconsistent with other published information (e.g. worked as a surveyor from 1838) and seems incorrect.) As a young man equipped with a sound education, he left for the Swan River Colony on Shepherd, arriving at Fremantle in 1838. He was immediately employed with the Survey Office, and worked as a surveyor until 1841, then again in 1843. In that year he led the Lefroy brothers, Gerald de Courcy and Anthony, who were searching for unleased pastoral land, on an expedition to the Moore River district. He then left the civil service and tried various occupations, including a failed attempt to join the Anglican ministry. When he applied to be a candidate, Archdeacon John Ramsden Wollaston placed him under Reverend Charles Harper at Toodyay. However Wollaston found him unsuitable:

his faults were "mental rather than moral, for he has always led a correct life, but never was able to settle his mind to any one pursuit" ... his aim was more for "displaying the ability he supposes himself to possess".

In 1851 Durlacher returned to work for the government, being variously employed as a clerk in the governor's office, working in the Finance Department and as registrar of deeds. In May 1853 he married Christina Slade, the daughter of Frederick Slade, a former resident magistrate of the Toodyay district. By 1856 the couple had five children. Durlacher rose in the ranks of the public service becoming acting Registrar General and clerk to the Finance Board, and a justice of the peace. In 1860 his wife died giving birth to their sixth child, who did not survive.

In 1861 Durlacher was appointed resident magistrate of the Toodyay district, replacing Joseph Strelley Harris, who had been transferred to Busselton. By then the new townsite of Newcastle had been established around the Convict Hiring Depot and Pensioner Guard village. The old town of Toodyay had been subject to periodic flooding while the Depot was situated upstream on higher ground. During 1860 there had been no new convict arrivals in the colony, leading to the belief that transportation had ceased. As a consequence many of the Depot buildings, which belonged to the Imperial government, had become vacant. When Durlacher arrived he was permitted to select a three-room building at the Depot to use as his residency. He considered it inadequate for his requirements, possibly one of the reasons why he left his young children in Perth in charge of a nursemaid, and unsuccessfully submitted a floor plan showing proposed extensions to the building.

In July 1861 Governor Arthur Kennedy allowed the colonial government to occupy unused buildings at the Depot. Durlacher was assigned the former superintendent's quarters.

His newly acquired quarters consisted of a sitting room, two bedrooms, a servant's quarters and a kitchen. The building had its own privy and a stable which stood in the adjacent paddock.

With the closing down of government buildings at the old Toodyay settlement, such as the new jail, the police were transferred to the Depot at Newcastle and re-located in the vacant buildings. Durlacher was instructed to provide a list of the buildings at the Newcastle Depot. Apart from the superintendent's quarters, which became the magistrate's residency, there were the warders' quarters, where the lock-up keeper lived; two sappers' quarters, one used for the courthouse and police; and the commissariat issuers' quarters and commissariat stables, which were occupied by the police. A new three-celled lock-up was built within a section of the barracks.

During 1861 Durlacher unsuccessfully put the case for a larger more secure lock-up in Newcastle. In August the infamous bushranger Joseph Bolitho Johns, popularly known as Moondyne Joe, had been arrested for horse stealing and put into the lock-up. He managed to break out, and while escaping stole Durlacher's new saddle and bridle, as well as a horse. A furious Durlacher wrote to the government, "Now perhaps my representations as to the lock-up will be believed". Johns was known for letting horses escape, then claiming the reward for finding them. He had played this trick on Durlacher before. Towards the end of 1864 a new lock-up was completed at Newcastle with the police assuming control in 1865.

Durlacher seems to have found respite from his official duties with the hobby of woodcarving. While very little is known about his private life, it appears his abilities were of a high enough standard to warrant exhibiting a pedestal he made from sandalwood in the 1862 International Exhibition in London.

In 1864 Durlacher married Deborah Wilberforce Clarkson (1834–1918), the daughter of Michael Clarkson and Jane (née Drummond). The couple had a son and two daughters, including Miriam Dorothy (Doris), who became a much-loved and respected midwife and nurse in the Toodyay district.

In December 1865 Durlacher was transferred to Geraldton to take over the functions of resident magistrate, collector of customs and internal revenue. Another of his duties was to oversee the establishment of the new Lynton Convict Depot. Labour was needed to work the lead mines in Northampton, and assist pastoralists moving their flocks northwards from Geraldton. However, the transfer was to be his undoing. During the time of his residency, Durlacher's financial accounting methods in relation to government funds were either lax or deliberately mismanaged for his own benefit. By the end of 1869, a large debt was discovered in relation to pastoral licenses. He was accused of defalcation of public funds, and rather than face the humiliation of a trial committed suicide. Durlacher died on 15 November 1869. His widow Deborah returned to Toodyay with the children to live with her Drummond and Clarkson relatives.

== General references ==
- Elliot, Ian (1998). Moondyne Joe: The Man and the Myth. Hesperian Press. ISBN 0-85905-244-3.
