= St Aloysius Convent boys dormitory, Toodyay =

Former school accommodation in Toodyay, Western Australia

St Aloysius Convent of Mercy classrooms and boys boarders dormitory (fmr)
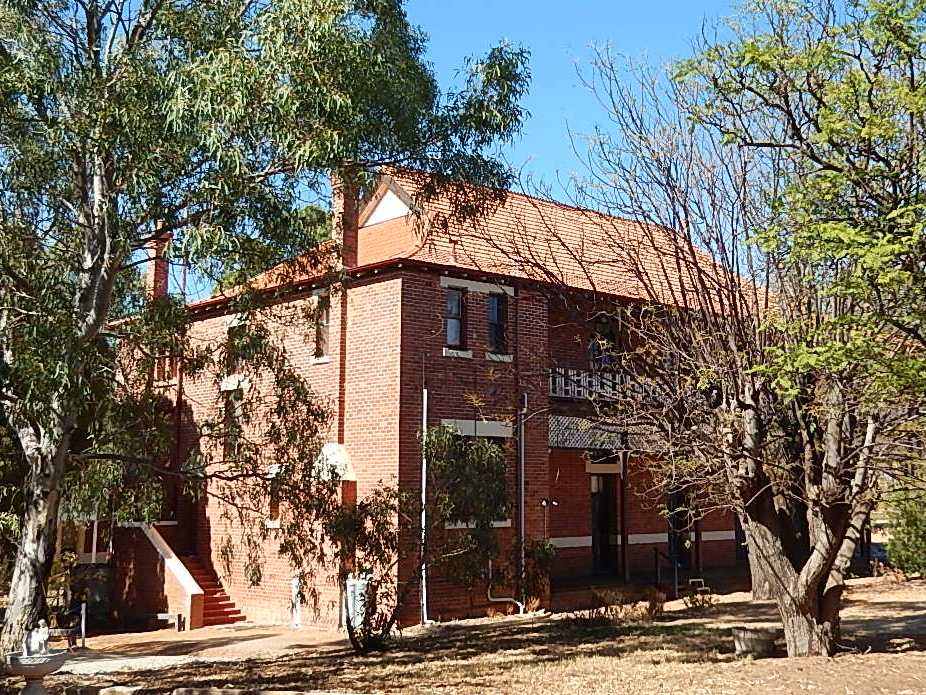
- Interactive map of the St Aloysius Convent of Mercy classrooms and boys boarders dormitory (fmr) area
- Former names: Avondown Centre

General information
- Architectural style: Federation Arts and Crafts
- Location: 34-38 Stirling Terrace, Toodyay, Australia
- Coordinates: 31°33′17″S 116°28′29″E
- Construction started: 1920
- Completed: 1921

Western Australia Heritage Register
- Official name: St Aloysius Convent of Mercy classrooms and boys boarders domitory (former)
- Type: State Registered Place
- Part of: Roman Catholic Church Group, Toodyay (4125)
- Reference no.: 24525

References
- Toodyay municipal inventory

St Aloysius Convent of Mercy classrooms and boys boarders dormitory is located on Stirling Terrace in Toodyay, Western Australia. This building is a part of the complex built by the Sisters of Mercy to provide accommodation and a school. This is a two-storey building and was constructed for school rooms and boys dormitories upstairs. A grand ball was held on 11 August 1921 to mark the opening of the new college building. The function was attended by 200 people and was held on the first floor.

It is a red bricked building and has a red tiled roof with decorative ridge tiles. There are double storey verandahs with timber panels. A leaded light window is on one side. Another side elevation has three large sash windows with the middle being wider than the two that are flanking it.

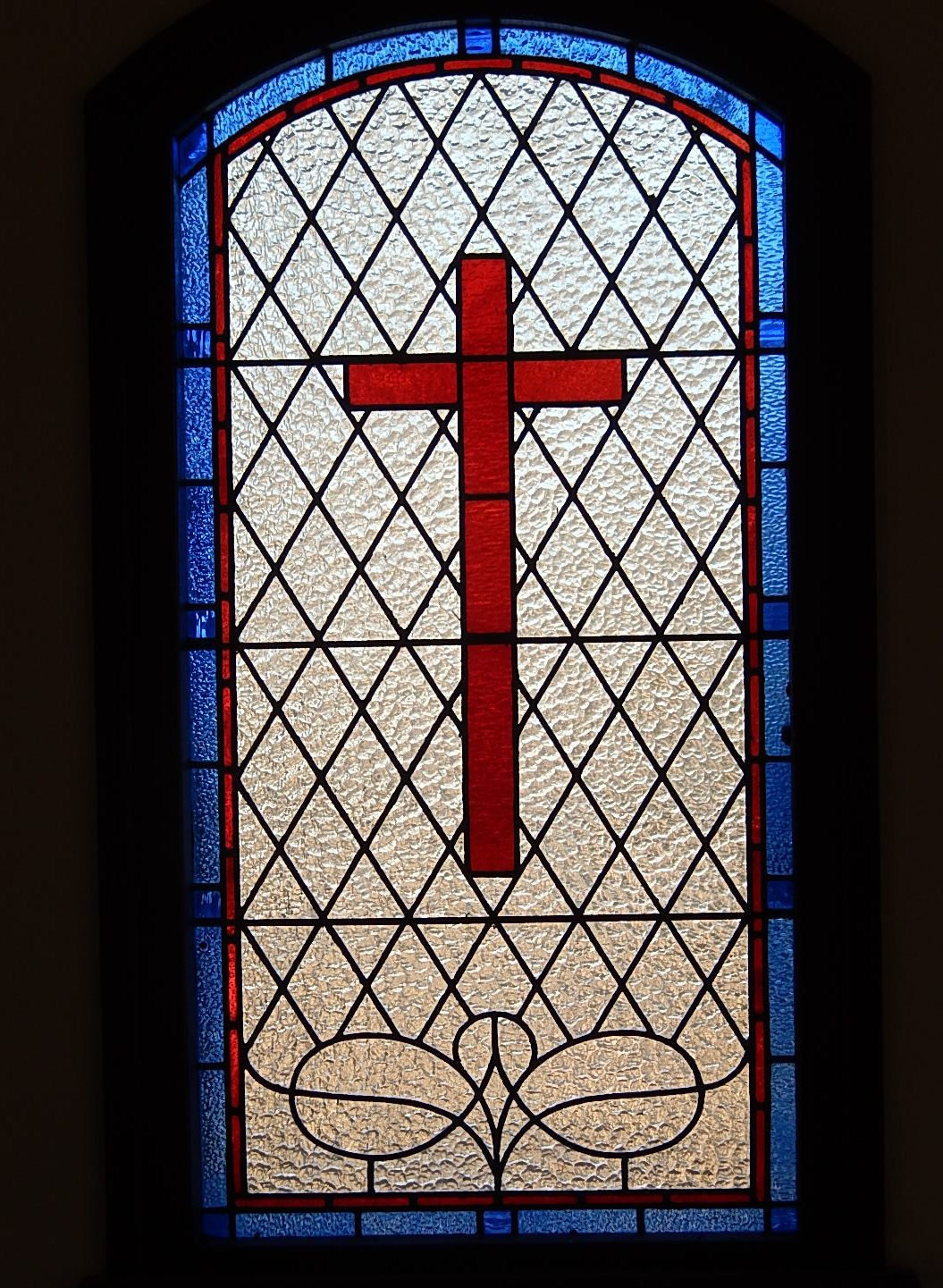
Leaded light window in St Aloysius boys dormitory
