= Toodyay Court House =

Building in Toodyay, Western Australia

Old Toodyay Court House
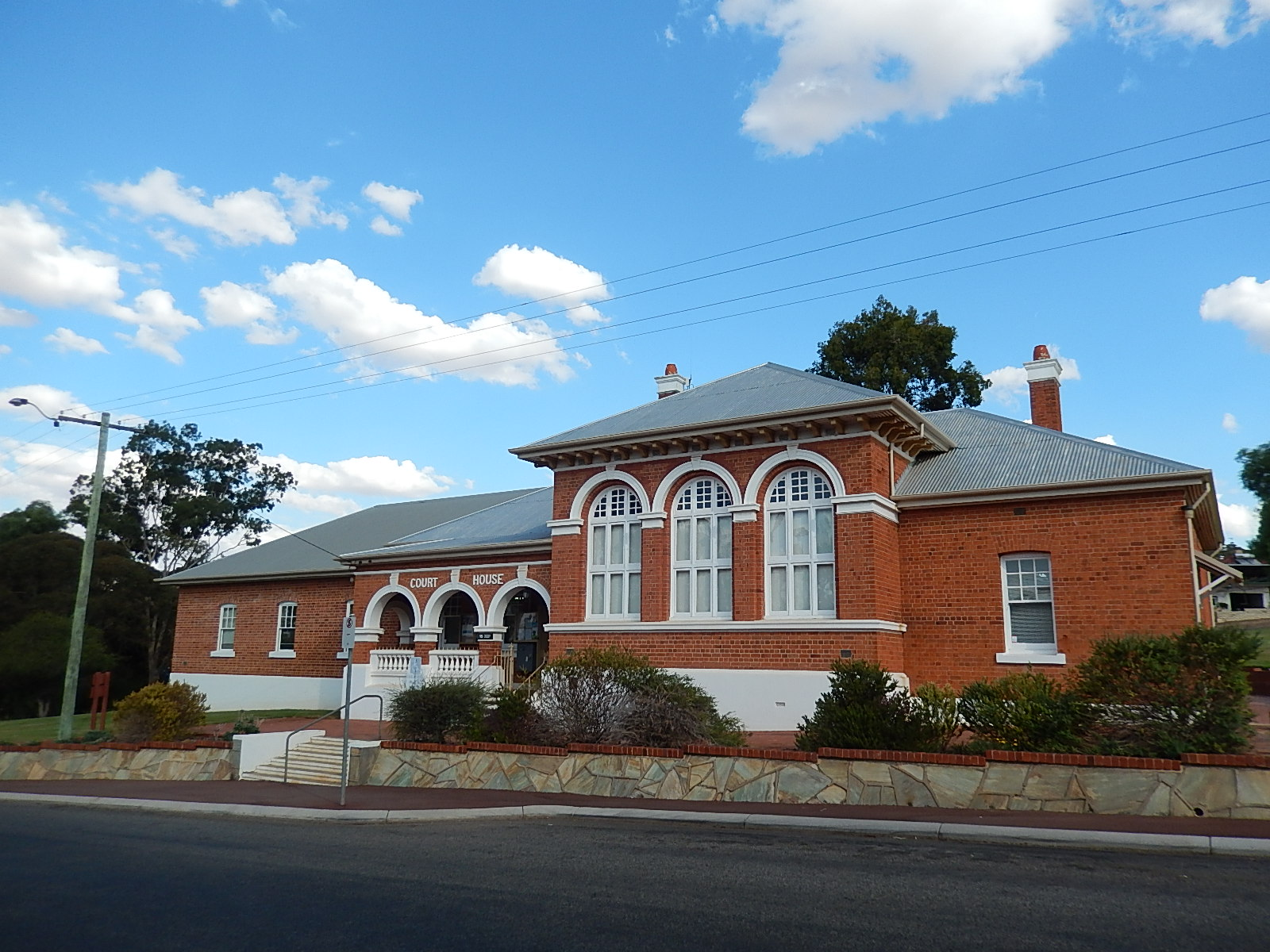
- Old Courthouse, Toodyay
- Interactive map of the Old Toodyay Court House area
- Alternative names: Toodyay Shire Council Offices

General information
- Architectural style: Federation Free Classical
- Location: 13–17 Fiennes Street, Toodyay
- Coordinates: 31.55287°S 116.465981°E
- Completed: 1896
- Renovated: 1985

Design and construction
- Architect: George Temple-Poole (1897)
- Architecture firm: Public Works Department
- Main contractor: Herbert Parker (1897)

Renovating team
- Architect: D.M.B. Fitzhardinge (1985)
- Renovating firm: Spadaccini Bros., Northam (1985)

Western Australia Heritage Register
- Type: State Registered Place
- Designated: 24 October 2014
- Reference no.: 2560

The former Toodyay Court House in Toodyay, Western Australia has been used as municipal offices for Toodyay since the 1950s.

== History ==
The main part of the building (designed by George Temple-Poole) was constructed in 1896 and opened in January 1897. It replaced the first courthouse on the site built in 1867 from plans by Richard Roach Jewell. The site had also been the location of a convict hiring depot; one of four established in the colony after convicts were introduced in 1850.

In 1902, after only 5 years of use, the last resident magistrate was withdrawn and the building was vacated. Many of the records that had been stored in the building were lost in the ensuing years. Surrounding buildings associated with the convict depot also declined, the old warders' quarters were demolished around 1931.

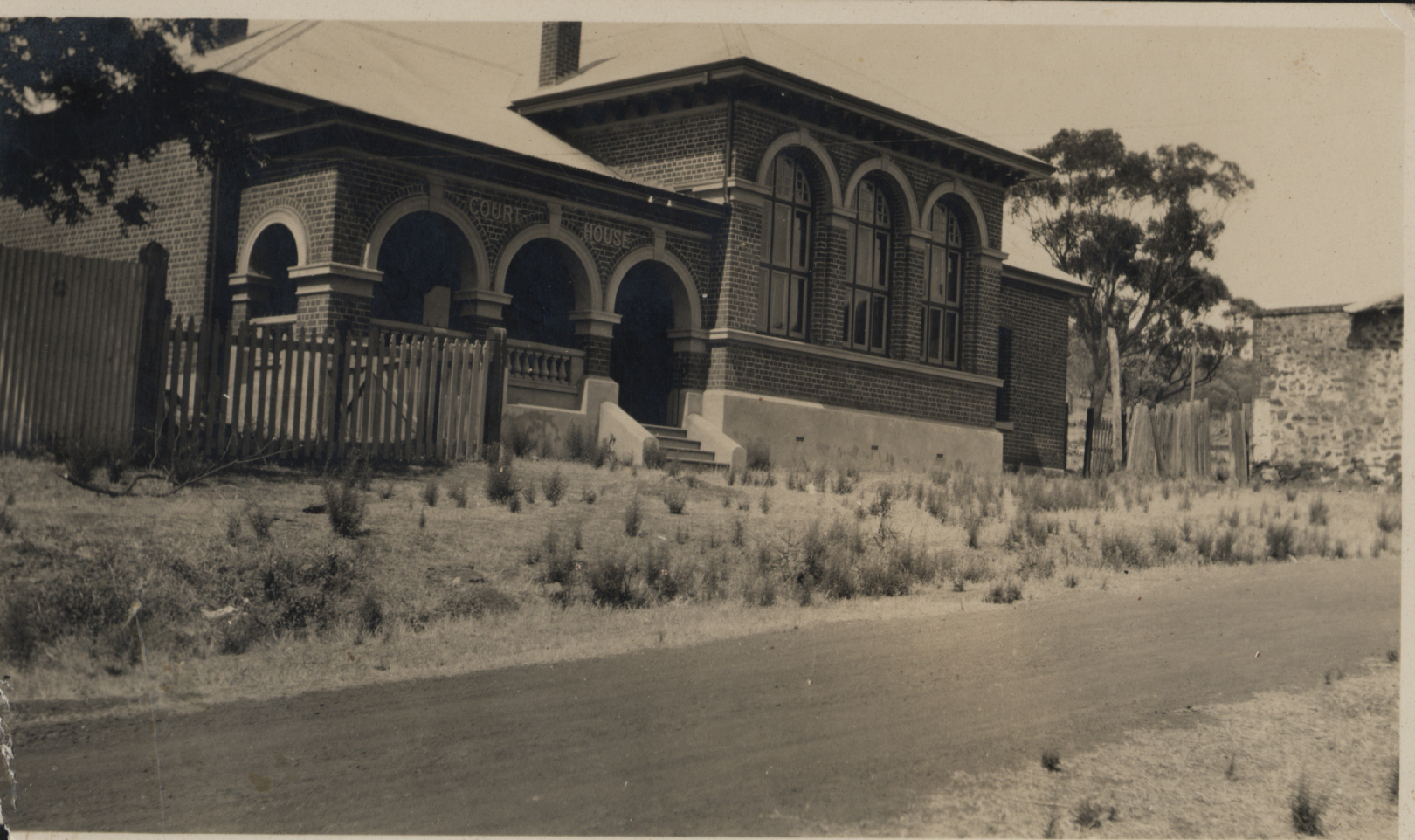
Toodyay Court House c1930 (At far right can be seen a section of the Toodyay Convict Depot Warder's Quarters, which were demolished around August 1931.)

In October 1956 the Under Secretary for Law (Mr Green) and Resident Magistrate, Northam (Keith Hamilton Hogg) met to discuss the restoration of the Court House after the Toodyay Health Inspector reported on the bad state of the building's drains.

In 1957 the Minister for Works approved the proposal for the Crown Law Department and the Toodyay Road Board to share the use of the Toodyay Court House. Most of the projected cost estimates for renovations were to be shared between the Public Works Department (£750) and the Road Board (£150) with a total cost of £1,000. The Board would have a 10-year lease of the building (with a right of renewal) for £5 or £10 per annum. The Board later accepted the terms offered.

In 1958 the Public Works Department let the contract to Mr Broderick for the removal of an old building adjacent to the Court House. This building, constructed in 1854 as the Toodyay Convict Depot Infirmary, was Toodyay's first public hospital. (The purpose built Newcastle Hospital replaced it in 1896.) The old building was then used as a drill room and store and later as the home of Norman Campbell until his death in May 1958.

On 1 January 1959 the Toodyay Road Board moved into the restored Court House building.

In 1985 additions were made to the eastern end of the building by Spadaccini Bros of Northam. The tendered amount was $104,130 to add 120m^{2} of office space. English bond style brickwork was used to complement the original 1896 Court House.

== Description ==
The building is a single storey building constructed of brick with a corrugated iron hipped roof in a Federation Free Classical style. The building sits upon a rendered plinth and has stuccoed archways, keystones and string courses with feature timber cornices.

== Heritage value ==
The former Court House building was classified by the National Trust of Australia (WA) on 7 June 1977 and included on the Shire of Toodyay's Municipal Heritage Inventory on 27 August 1998. On 14 February 2003 it was placed on the permanent state heritage register.

In 2010, an archaeological excavation of a 2-hectare (4.9-acre) site around and including the former court building revealed the foundations of the convict depot. The entire site was added to the state heritage register in June 2014.
