= Charles Harper (minister) =

First Anglican minister in Toodyay, Western Australia

- Born: 30 January 1799
- Died: 2 November 1872 (aged 73)
- Spouse: Julia Gretchen Lukin
- Church: Anglican

Charles Harper (1799–1872) was Toodyay's first Anglican minister, and the first ordinand from Western Australia. While being a minister of the church was probably far from his intentions when he set sail for the Swan River Colony in 1837, his family's clerical background and his own disposition suited him well for this vocation. Harper served the Toodyay district for over 30 years, first as registrar of births, deaths and marriages, then from 1849 as an ordained minister.

== Early life ==
Harper was born on 30 January 1799, and worked as a solicitor in London. In June 1837 he married Julia Gretchen Lukin, the sister of Lionel Lukin, and granddaughter of Lionel Lukin (1742–1834). Young Lukin had returned to England from the Swan River Colony to settle a land dispute in the Murray district. This was successfully resolved with Lukin relocating his land grant to Deepdale, a grant in Toodyay that had originally been allocated to Governor Stirling. Lukin and Harper became partners, and in 1837 the Harpers, together with Lukin and his young bride Jane, set sail for Western Australia on Eleanor, arriving at Fremantle on 23 December. The Harpers were to have five children, four daughters and a son Charles Harper (junior) who became a prominent and highly respected citizen in Western Australia.

In 1840 Charles Harper took out a long-term lease on "Nardie", located on the Avon River several miles upstream of the townsite of Toodyay. When their infant daughter Isabella died in 1840 she was buried on the property, with Harper holding a simple burial service. This burial site became the future Nardie Cemetery. (Note: Nardie Cemetery was gazetted in 1857 and contains the graves of a number of Toodyay's earliest settlers.) While the Harpers lived at Nardie the homestead became known for "the gentle refinement of its mistress and the outspoken concern of its master for the spiritual welfare of his neighbours". Harper became a popular lay preacher while continuing his farming activities, which included stock and acreage under wheat and barley. In 1843 he was appointed the local registrar for births, deaths and marriages. His career path was set.

== Ministry ==
In 1847 the Church of England constituted a new diocese of Adelaide, which included all of Western Australia. The following year Bishop Augustus Short of Adelaide, accompanied by Archdeacon Matthew Hale (Note: Later Bishop Hale of Perth.) came on a visit to assess the needs of the colony. They visited all the settlements including Toodyay, where the Bishop undertook baptisms and confirmations prepared by Harper. Short encouraged Harper to become an ordained minister and to this end in August 1849 Harper set sail for Adelaide, where he was ordained. He returned with a cheque towards the cost of building a church.

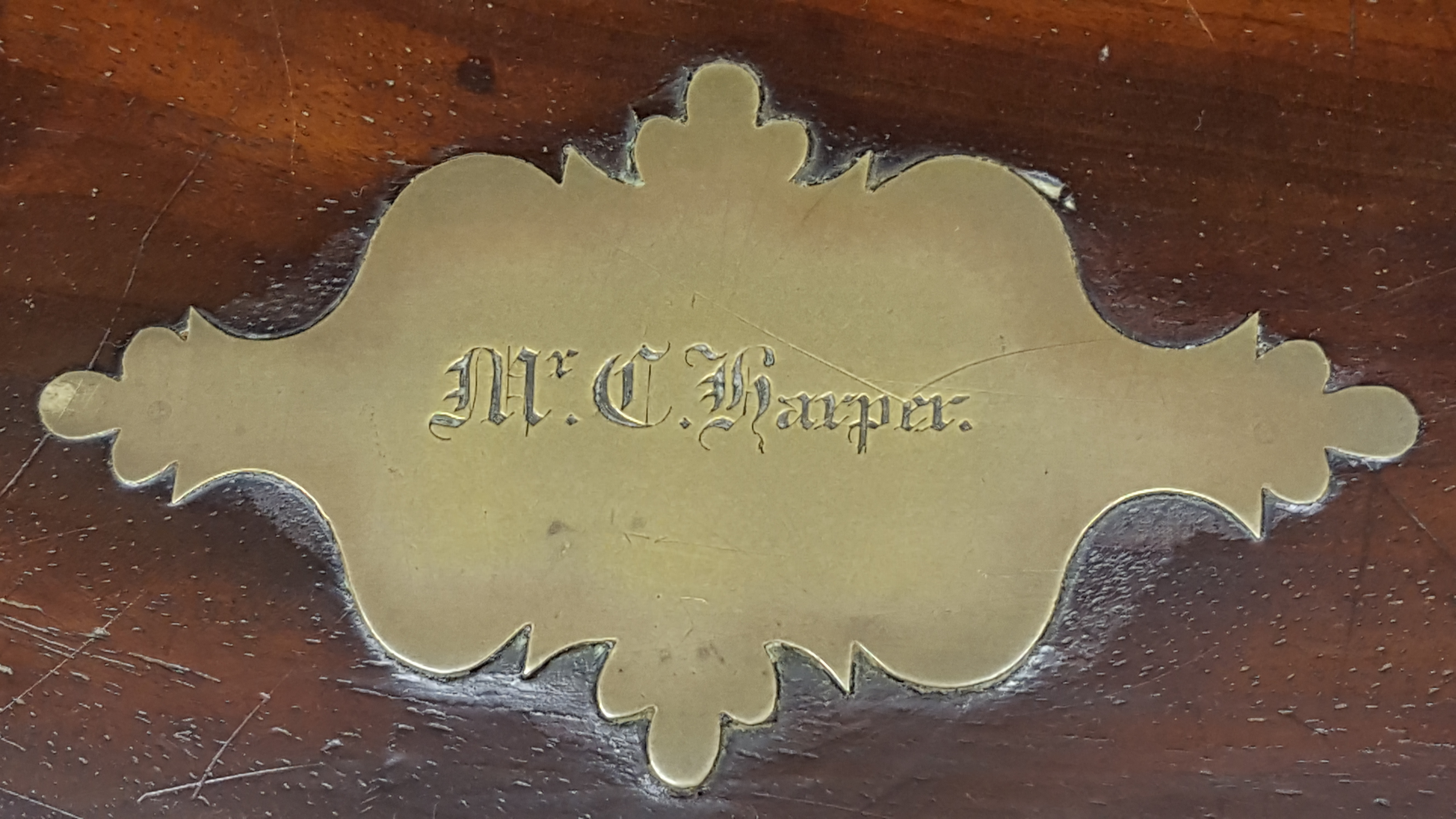
Engraved name plate on travelling writing case owned by Charles Harper

Harper's parish was large and included the whole of the Avon district, extending to Northam and York. He conducted regular services in the church at York, and at various private homes, travelling the long distances on his horse. It was exhausting work, especially as he had to continue farming; a minister's stipend was insufficient to cover his needs and those of his family.

The location for the church in Toodyay, which would also serve as a school, became a point of contention between Harper and the church committee. Ecclesiastical grants of land had been made at the Toodyay townsite on both sides of the river. The disagreement went on for several years, and was finally resolved when recurrent flooding of the Toodyay townsite led to the establishment of the new town of Newcastle upstream. Gazetted in 1860, Newcastle town lots were surveyed around the Convict Hiring Depot that had been established there in 1852. Harper, who was also responsible for the souls of the convicts by providing daily services, had already acquired land at the Depot site for his future home and parsonage "Braybrook". A lot was allocated, and St Stephen's Anglican Church was built, then consecrated in 1862 by Bishop Hale. Convict labour was employed for both buildings.

As a religious man ministering to his flock Harper was not alone during these years. In 1856 Raffaele Martelli, a highly intelligent and learned man, was appointed parish priest for the Catholic citizens of the Toodyay district. The two men became friends.

During these years Harper and Archdeacon John Wollaston became firm friends. Wollaston had been appointed Archdeacon for Western Australia and regularly travelled through the rural settlements. His journals are famous for their informative observations about the development of the colony and insights about its citizens and clergy. He described Harper as being "truly and intelligently Church", but held concerns about the strenuous demands made upon him.

Harper served his parish well. He helped to set up the Toodyay Public Library and was elected president of the Newcastle Mechanics' Institute at its inaugural meeting in July 1866, but failing health led to his premature death. He died at home on 2 November 1872.
