= St Aloysius Convent girls dormitory, Toodyay =

Dormitory in Toodyay, Western Australia

St Aloysius Convent of Mercy classrooms and girls dormitory (fmr)
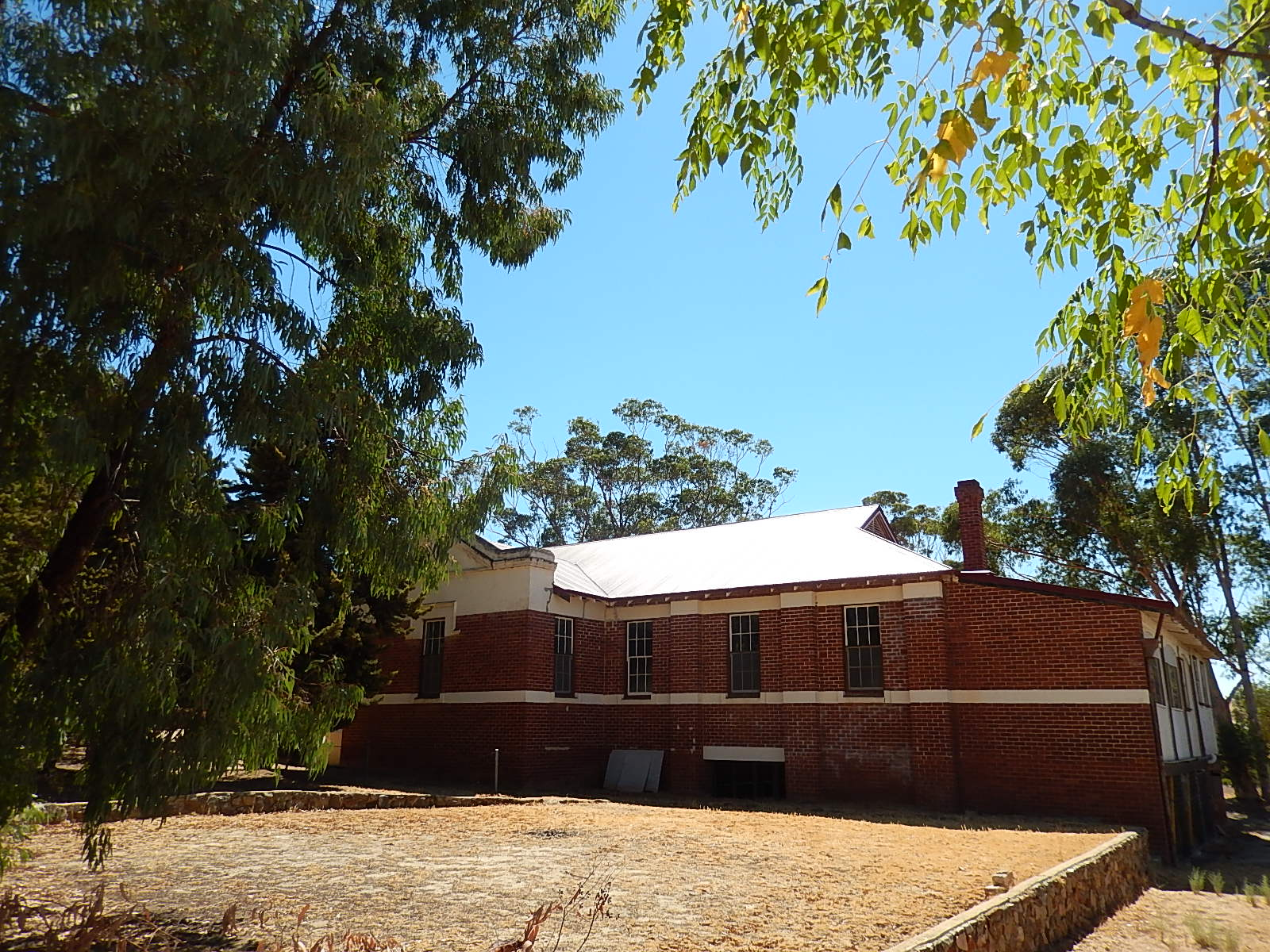
- Interactive map of the St Aloysius Convent of Mercy classrooms and girls dormitory (fmr) area
- Former names: O'Connor House

General information
- Architectural style: Federation Classical
- Location: 34-38 Stirling Terrace, Toodyay, Australia
- Coordinates: 31°33′16″S 116°28′31″E
- Completed: 1929

Design and construction
- Architect: Edgar le B. Henderson
- Main contractor: William Thomas Clark

Western Australia Heritage Register
- Official name: St Aloysius Convent of mercy classrooms and girls dormitory (former)
- Type: State Registered Place
- Part of: Roman Catholic Church Group, Toodyay (4125)
- Reference no.: 24459

References
- Toodyay municipal inventory

St Aloysius Convent of Mercy classrooms and girls dormitory (fmr) is located on Stirling Terrace in Toodyay, Western Australia. This building is a part of the complex the Sisters of Mercy built to provide accommodation and a school. William Thomas Clark built the single storey building, tendering £4,444 for the job in 1928. Mr. Edgar Le B. Henderson of Perth was the architect. It accommodated 35 girls and was strong enough to carry another storey if required. Patrick Clune, Lord Archbishop of Perth, opened the building on 12 May 1929. As well as providing accommodation for the girl boarders along with a night study area and rooms for the sisters in charge, the premises were used annually for the Convent Ball.

The building is constructed of red brick and red corrugated iron, and has decorative cement render and timber framed windows.
