= Anthony O'Grady Lefroy =

Australian politician (1816–1897)

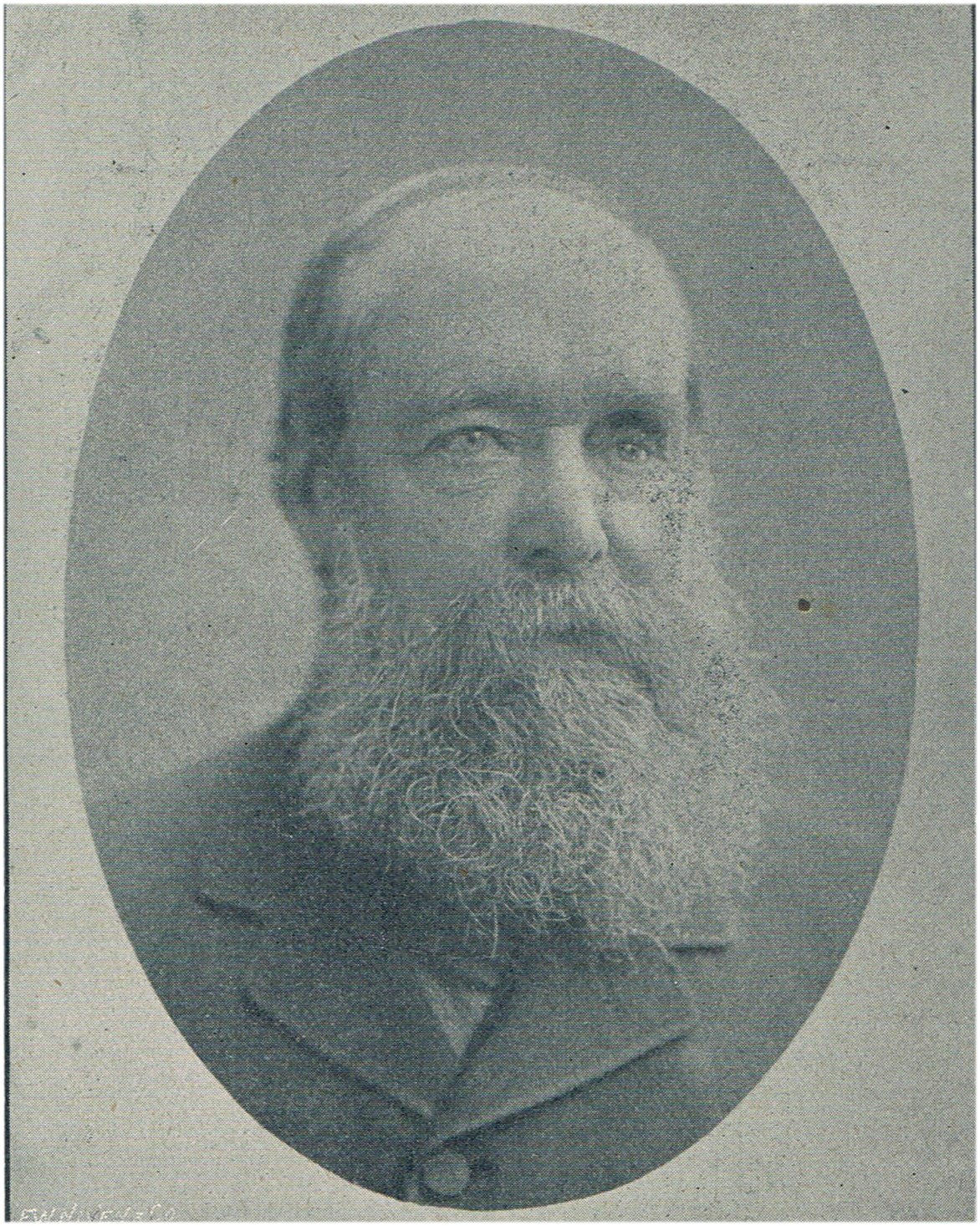
Anthony O'Grady Lefroy

Anthony O'Grady Lefroy CMG (14 March 1816 – 21 January 1897), often known as O'Grady Lefroy, was an important government official in Western Australia before the advent of responsible government.

O'Grady Lefroy was born at Limerick, Ireland on 14 March 1816. He was the nephew of Thomas Langlois Lefroy (Chief Justice of Ireland and Jane Austen's youthful love). In 1842, at the age of 27, he migrated to Western Australia on board the Lady Grey. In 1847, Lefroy and his brother Gerald accompanied Alfred Durlacher in exploring the area that later became known as Gingin. Shortly afterwards, he purchased land at Walebing, where he was a pastoralist until retiring in favour of his son in 1873.

Lefroy was private secretary to Governor Charles Fitzgerald from 1843 probably until 1853, and again from 1854 to 1855. In 1851 he was Clerk to the Executive and Legislative Councils. In 1856, Lefroy was appointed Colonial Treasurer, and he would hold that position for over 30 years, until the advent of responsible government in December 1890. He did, however, spend portions of this period in England: he was in England in 1858, 1863–65, and 1868–71.

When Colonial Secretary of Western Australia Frederick Barlee took long service leave in July 1875, Lefroy was appointed acting Colonial Secretary. In December of that year he was appointed a member of the Western Australian Legislative Council. The following year he became a Justice of the Peace. When Barlee was posted to the British Honduras early in 1877, Roger Goldsworthy was appointed the new Colonial Secretary; Lefroy ceased to be acting Colonial Secretary and a member of the Legislative Council on 30 August 1877. The following year, he was made CMG.

O'Grady Lefroy's 30-year tenure as Colonial Treasurer ended on 29 December 1890 when John Forrest, Western Australia's first Premier, was sworn into the position. Lefroy retired to Perth, dying there on 21 January 1897. He was survived by his wife of 44 years Mary Bruce, and five children. One of his sons was Henry Lefroy, who would later become the 11th Premier of Western Australia.
