= Michael Clarkson (pastoralist) =

Settler of Western Australia

- Born: 7 June 1804; Bubwith, Yorkshire
- Died: April 1871
- Spouse: Jane Drummond (7 November 1833 – April 1871)

Michael Clarkson (7 June 1804 – April 1871) was one of the early settlers in colonial Western Australia and in particular the Avon region.

Clarkson was born in Bubwith, Yorkshire, to Barnard Clarkson and Elizabeth (née Smith). He was the eldest of six children.

In February 1830, Clarkson and his brother James Smith Clarkson arrived at the Swan River on Tranby. They had chartered the brig in association with Joseph Hardey, a farmer and Wesleyan layman and his brother John Wall Hardey. The immigrants, including family members and indentured servants, were all Methodists and well versed in farming practices. They established their farms on 207 hectares (512 acres) fronting the Swan River, at what is now known as Maylands, and called it the Peninsula. During this time either Michael or James joined Robert Dale, who was charged by Governor James Stirling to lead a party to explore the country east of the Darling Range. The party left in late 1830, and found and named the Avon River flowing through good pastoral country. The townsites of Beverley, York and Northam were marked out and the land opened for selection. Among the first claimants for land grants were Joseph Hardey and the Clarkson brothers. They called their York grant Wilberforce after William Wilberforce, the English politician and philanthropist who led the movement to abolish slavery.

In January 1833, the brothers were joined by younger brother Charles Foster and their recently widowed father Barnard Clarkson. Later that year on 7 November, Michael married Jane (Jain) Drummond (1831–1905), the eldest daughter of James Drummond the botanist. Two years later the couple went to live at Wilberforce with the father. They had five sons and two daughters, including Deborah Wilberforce (1834), who became the wife of Toodyay's resident magistrate Alfred Durlacher, and Barnard Drummond Clarkson (1836), the future Toodyay member of the Legislative Assembly. Clarkson sold his grant at Wilberforce and returned to Peninsula farm and worked as a commission agent at Guildford. He and Jane were to make many moves during their marriage.

In 1844, the Clarksons moved to Jane's family home Hawthornden while Michael farmed at nearby Nunyle. However times were hard; the 1840s were depression years in the colony. The price of sheep and wool had fallen and many farmers, including the Drummonds and Clarksons, were finding it hard to make a living. In 1849 Clarkson and his wife left for Toodyay, where he became acting postmaster. Clarkson's working life over the next couple of years was varied. With the introduction of convicts in 1850, and the establishment of a convict hiring depot at Toodyay, he was put in charge of one of the first groups of ticket of leave men to make its way to the district. He was then appointed superintendent of the depot, but due to disharmony between himself and the convict overseer he was transferred to the Mt Eliza Hiring Depot in Perth. In 1854, he returned to Toodyay where he once more took up farming. By 1860, life was becoming more prosperous in the region. Clarkson had leased the Mt Anderson grant where he had a large flock of sheep and was cropping 23 hectares (56 acres).

Clarkson also became involved in local affairs. In 1854, he was the judge at the first agricultural show to be held in Toodyay, and became secretary of the Agricultural Society. He was a trustee of the Anglican Church, and became one of the vice presidents at the inaugural meeting of the Newcastle Mechanics' Institute in July 1866.

Following his death, Clarkson was buried in the Drummond family cemetery at Hawthornden.

== General references ==
- "Clarkson from Yorkshire to Western Australia". FamilyTreeCircles.
- Rica Erickson, ed. (1988–1999). Bicentennial Dictionary of Western Australians: Pre-1829 – 1888. Vol. 1 A–C. Nedlands: UWA Publishing. p. 559. ISBN 0-85564-278-5. LCCN 88151753. OCLC 19221630. OL 2102384M. Wikidata Q115122719.

This article incorporates text by Robyn Taylor available under the CC BY SA 2.5 AU licence.
