= St Aloysius Convent of Mercy =

Former convent in Toodyay, Western Australia

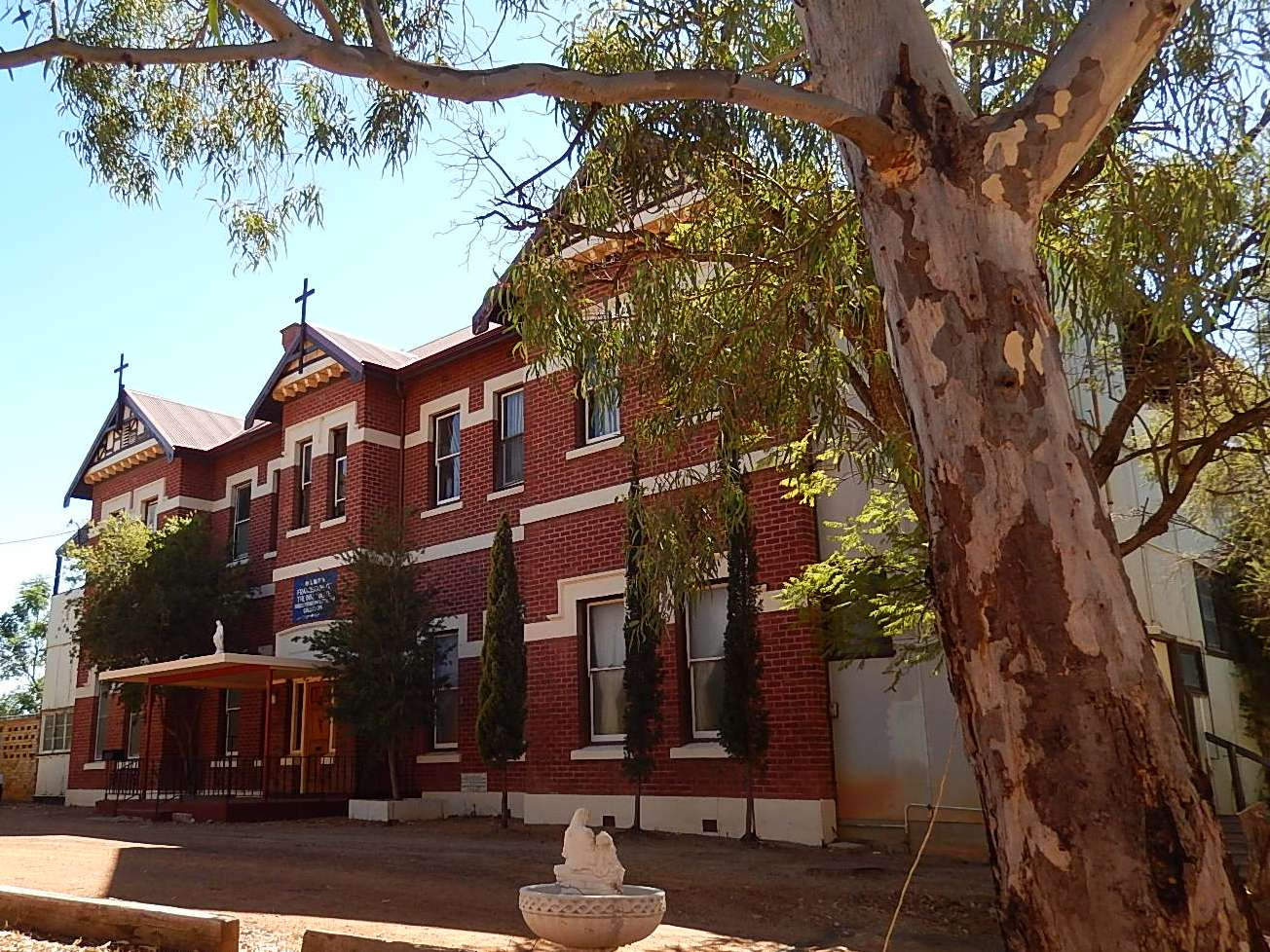
- Stirling Terrace, Toodyay. Part of the Catholic precinct.
- Interactive map of the St Aloysius Convent of Mercy area
- Former names: Mercy House; Toodyay Convent of Mercy

General information
- Architectural style: Federation/Victorian
- Location: 34–38 Stirling Terrace, Toodyay, Australia
- Coordinates: 31.554237°S 116.474929°E
- Completed: 1903

Design and construction
- Architects: Edgar Jerome Henderson and Harry Jefferies
- Main contractor: Hart Bros

Western Australia Heritage Register
- Official name: Roman Catholic Church Group, Toodyay
- Type: State Registered Place
- Designated: 26 August 2019
- Reference no.: 4125

References
- Toodyay municipal inventory

St Aloysius Convent of Mercy is a former Catholic convent located on Stirling Terrace in Toodyay, Western Australia, part of a larger site owned by the Church. This building is a part of the complex built by the Sisters of Mercy to provide accommodation and a school.

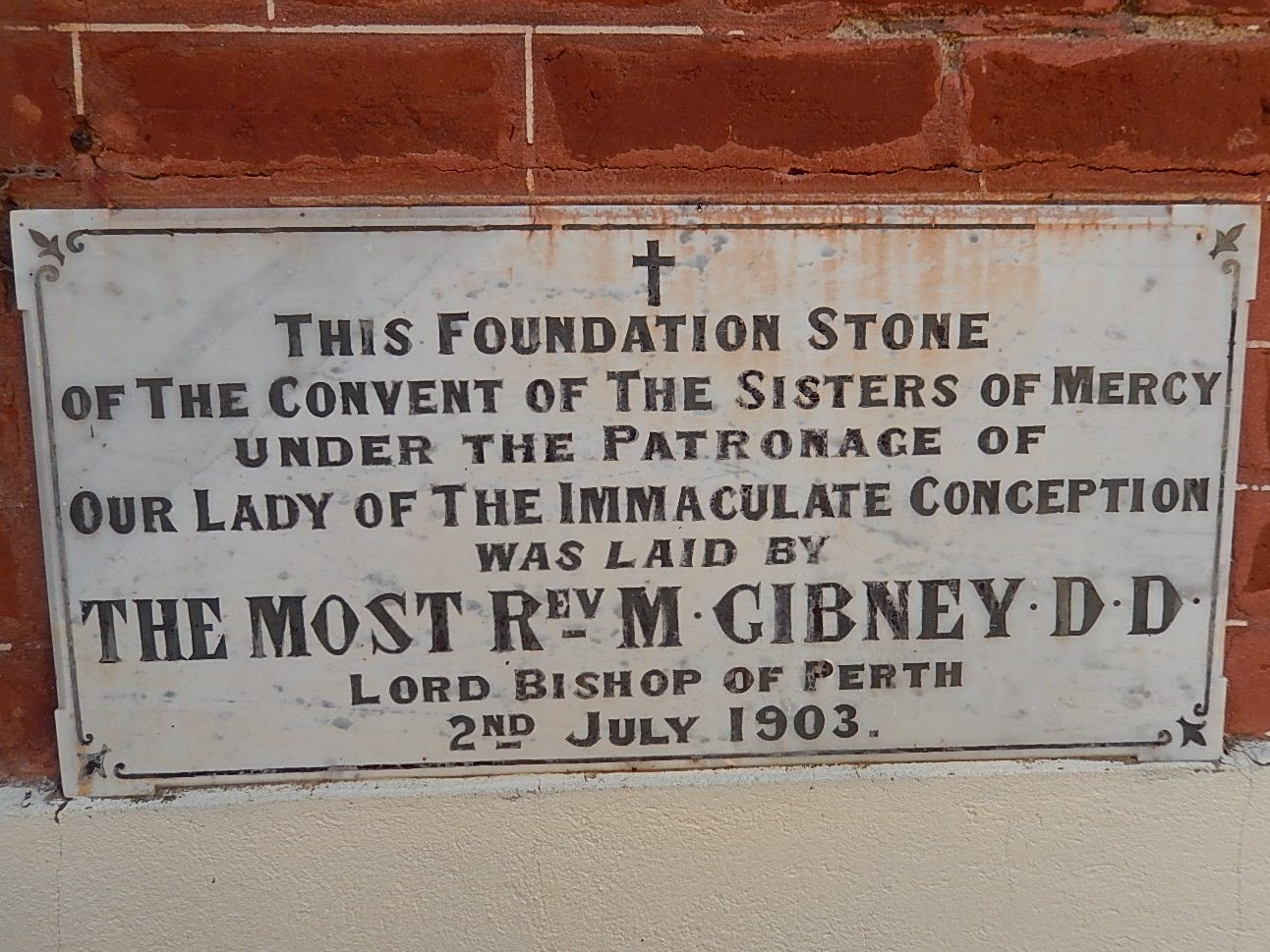
Foundation stone

Reverend Matthew Gibney, the Lord Bishop of Perth, laid the foundation stone of this building in July 1903. Gibney returned for the official opening ceremony in September of the same year. The construction of the convent was almost entirely funded by the family of Daniel Connor, who had been a very devout Catholic.

The building is an imposing two storey red brick structure with red corrugated iron roof. Rendered bands extend around the building and along the window sills. There are gabled wings to each end, with half timbering creating a symmetrical façade. There is a two-storey panelled side extension joining the building to the current St John the Baptist Church.

== See also ==
- Angela Browne (nun)
