= St John the Baptist Church, Toodyay =

St John the Baptist Church
- The New Church
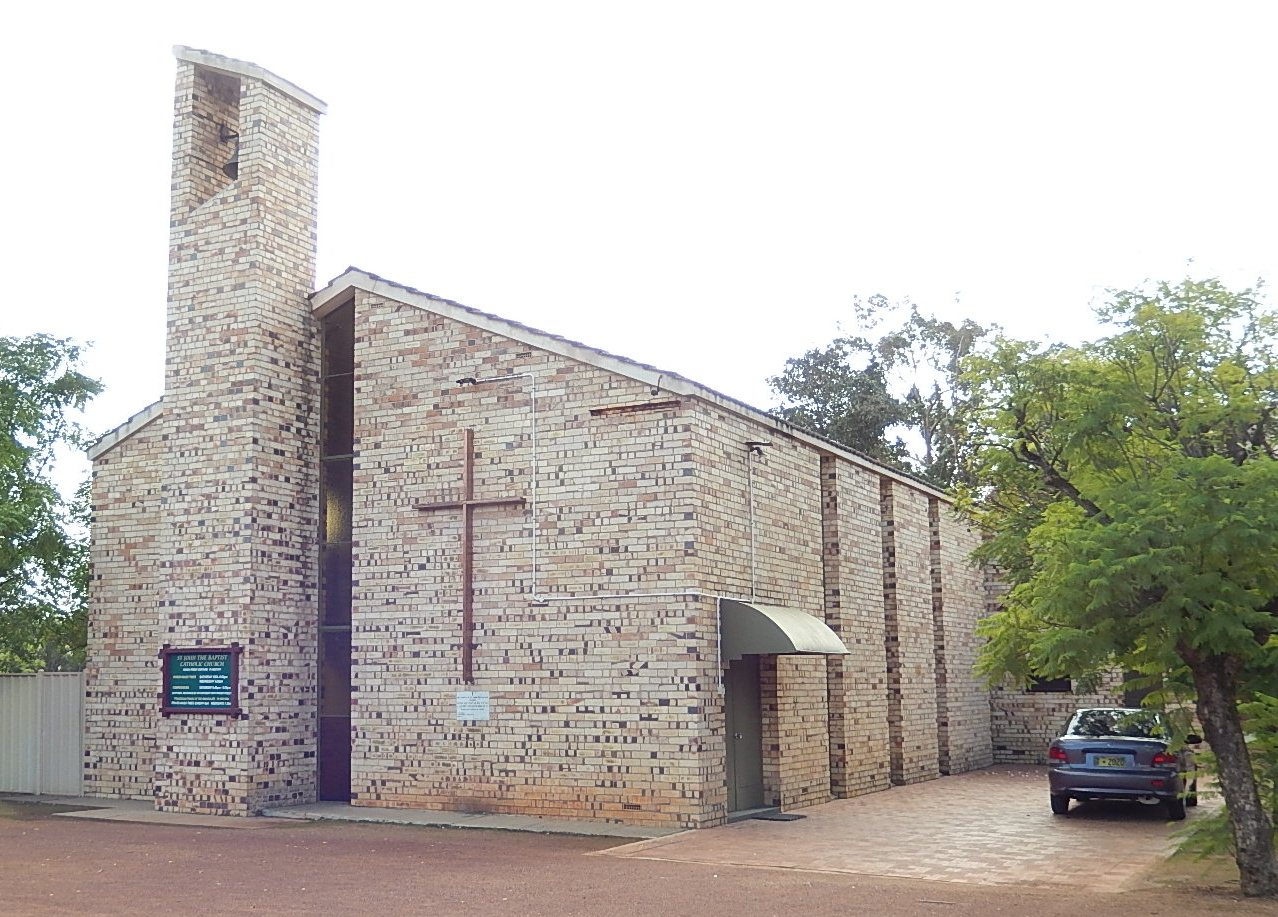
- St John the Baptist Church in 2014
- St John the Baptist Church
- 31.5544°S 116.4745°E
- Location: Stirling Terrace, Toodyay
- Country: Australia
- Denomination: Roman Catholic

History
- Status: Church
- Founded: 17 November 1963
- Consecrated: 17 November 1963

Architecture
- Functional status: Active
- Completed: 1963

Administration
- Archdiocese: Perth
- Parish: St Joseph's, Northam

Western Australia Heritage Register
- Official name: Roman Catholic Church Group, Toodyay
- Type: State Registered Place
- Designated: 26 August 2019
- Reference no.: 4125

St John the Baptist Church is a Roman Catholic church in Toodyay, Western Australia, part of a group of church buildings. It was built and consecrated in 1963. It is the second church of that name, replacing the one built in 1863.

== History ==
The new church replaced the original St John the Baptist Church across the road. The older building was in poor repair, and in 1963, when the standard gauge railway line also came through in close proximity, a decision was made to relocate. After fundraising and support from the shire and local businesses, the church was officially opened on 17 November 1963 with the blessing of M. McKeon, Auxiliary Bishop of Perth. The altar and tabernacle of the new church were donated by the O'Connor estate. A brass plaque, transferred from the former church, commemorates the contribution of the Quinlan family.

== Parish leadership ==
Priests who have administered to the Parish since the consecration of the church are:

- 1958–67 Fr John Chokolich
- 1967 Fr Alex Morahan
- 1968–72 Fr Carmelo Di Giorgio
- 1972 Fr W. de Bruyn
- 1974–81 Fr John E.C. Lisle
- 1981–84 Fr Reginald Smith
- 1984–86 Fr T. McDonald
- 1986–92 Fr T. Hewitt
- 1993–94 Fr Kevin Hay
- April – Nov 1994 Fr Pat Russell

Then served and cared for from Northam:

- 1995–96 Fr Greg Donovan
- 1997 Fr Kaz Stuglik
- 1998–2000 Fr Robert Carrillo
- 2001-04 Frs Stephen Casey & James D'Souza
- 2004-06 Fr Geoff Aldous
- 2006-11 Frs Andrew Bowron & Richard Ye Myint
- 2012 Frs Dominic Savio & Richard Ye Myint
- 2013 Frs Pavol Herda & Emmanuel Dimobi
