= Leeder's House =

House in Toodyay, Western Australia

Leeder's House & Shop
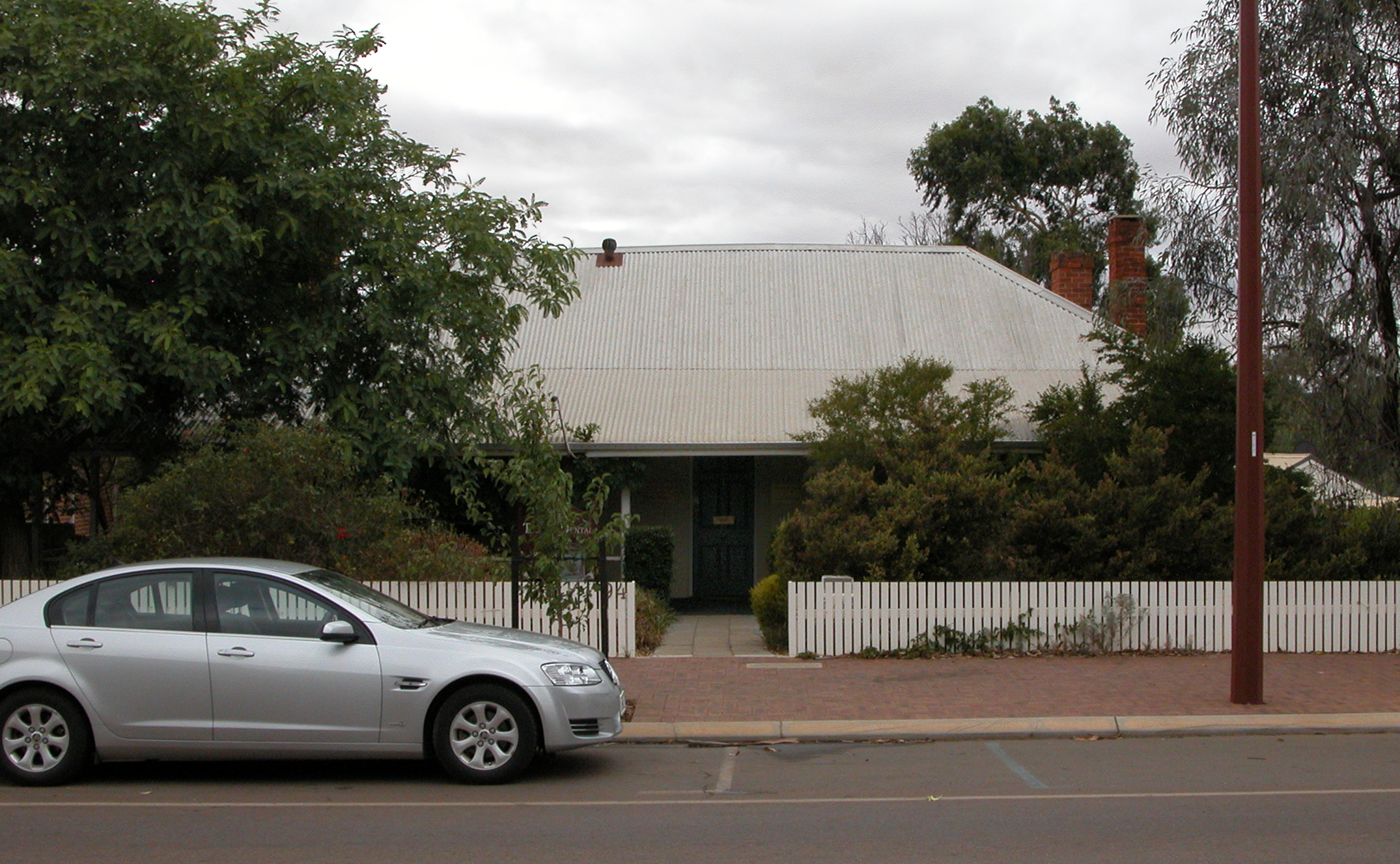
- Interactive map of the Leeder's House & Shop area
- Former names: Sisters of Mercy

General information
- Architectural style: Victorian Georgian
- Location: 94 Stirling Terrace, Toodyay
- Coordinates: 31°33′02″S 116°28′11″E
- Completed: early 1870s
- Renovated: 1884

References
- Toodyay municipal inventory

Leeder's House is situated on Stirling Terrace in Toodyay, Western Australia.

It was built in the early 1870s as a double storey brick construction with a shingle roof. Extensions to the front of the building at the floor level of the upper storey took place in 1884. The building was owned by William Leeder, who managed the Freemasons Hotel and later leased, then purchased the Newcastle Hotel. Leeder was a member of the Newcastle Road Board and Mayor of Newcastle. The property was purchased by the Sisters of Mercy in 1884, and they used the building as a Catholic school until 1902.
