= William George Leeder =

Australian politician

William George Leeder (1845–1906) was the mayor of Newcastle, Western Australia several times between 1878 and 1899.

He was born 6 March 1845, the eldest son of William Henry Leeder, after whom the Perth suburb of Leederville was named, and married Hannah Emily Morrell on 22 November 1866.

He died in Toodyay on 27 August 1906.

== See also ==
- Leeder's House
