= Toodyay Convict Hiring Depot (1852–1872) =

- Interactive map of the Toodyay Convict Hiring Depot area

General information
- Type: Heritage listed buildings
- Location: Toodyay, Western Australia
- Coordinates: 31°33′10″S 116°27′58″E

Western Australia Heritage Register
- Official name: Toodyay Court House (former) and former Convict Depot Archaeological Sites
- Type: State Registered Place
- Designated: 24 October 2014
- Reference no.: 2560

Construction of the new Toodyay Convict Hiring Depot began in February 1852 and was completed by 1856. The depot was closed in 1872. The site chosen, Avon Location 110, was an area of Crown land measuring just over 18 hectares (45 acres). It was situated approximately 4.8 kilometres (3 mi) upstream from the site of the previous Toodyay Convict Hiring Depot (1851) located at the Toodyay townsite (now known as West Toodyay). The previous depot had only ever been a temporary arrangement born of necessity when accommodation was required at short notice. The new depot site was surveyed by Francis Thomas Gregory in 1852.

All convict hiring depots were built according to a similar basic plan, although variations occurred due to the lay of the land and other circumstances unique to the area. The site, beneath and around the current Shire of Toodyay offices, was heritage listed in 2014.

== Structures ==
The Toodyay Convict Hiring Depot contained the following structures:

Building	Location	Built	Notes
Depot Barracks	31.55278°S 116.46611°E	1852-1853	Built of brick, shingled roof, brick-paved floor
Warders’ Quarters	31.55278°S 116.46528°E	1852-1853	Built of stone, shingled roof, floor boards
Infirmary	31.55278°S 116.46639°E	1853-1855	Built of brick, shingled roof, floor boards, ceiling beams lined using sawn timber
Kitchen/Bake house	31.55306°S 116.46611°E	1854	Temporary building of 1852 replaced in 1854 by cookhouse of brick construction, shingled roof, brick-paved floor
Commissariat	31.55333°S 116.46778°E	1852-1855	Built of stone, shingled roof, brick-paved floor. Brick extension 1853. Complex completed 1855
Sappers’ Quarters	31.55389°S 116.46806°E	1852,1854	Two quarters, one built of stone, the other of brick. Brick-paved floors. Roofs shingled
Superintendent's Office	31.55000°S 116.46722°E	1852	Built of stone with a shingled roof, brick-paved floor
Blacksmith's Shop	31.55167°S 116.46694°E	1852	Essential for depot. Also had a good well
Superintendent's Quarters	31.55194°S 116.46583°E	1855-1856	Built of brick, floor boards, shingled roof. Two bedrooms, sitting room, kitchen, servant's room

== Preparations ==
In February 1852, Second Lieutenant Edmund Frederick Du Cane was placed in charge of all convict works within the Eastern District of the Swan River Colony. The building of convict hiring depots at Guildford, York and Toodyay became his responsibility. Improvement of district roads and bridges would be under his direction. Du Cane was advised to travel regularly from one depot site to another, especially during the early years of construction. His home would be at Guildford. Detailed progress reports were to be submitted to Comptroller General E Y Henderson every six months.

Du Cane was made a Visiting Magistrate in September 1852 to ensure that punishment for offences committed would be administered within an appropriate time frame. Henderson always advised care in administering punishment which, under convict law, could be severe.

The 20th Regiment of Sappers and Miners of the Royal Engineers began arriving at the end of 1852, their task being to supervise the development of infrastructure necessary to the new convict system. It was agreed that non-commissioned officers of Sappers and Miners would fill the dual role of instructing warders at convict hiring depots, prisons, various administration buildings, roads and bridges in addition to escorting convicts to and from work sites. Sappers who were trained blacksmiths, carpenters and stonemasons would be of immense value during the construction of convict hiring depots.

Enrolled Pensioner Guards were attached to each convict hiring depot. Many became regular warders. A senior assistant superintendent was appointed to each depot. Lionel Lukin, who resided on the adjacent property of "Deepdale", was one such man appointed to the Toodyay Convict Hiring Depot.

== Construction ==
Construction of the new Toodyay Convict Hiring Depot began immediately after the appointment of Du Cane. Throughout 1852, Du Cane was assisted in Toodyay by Corporal Joseph Nelson and six other sappers who were acting as instructing warders. The new Toodyay Lock-up, situated at the old township of Toodyay, was completed at the end of 1852, after which time the number of sappers was reduced to four.

Avon Location 110 was situated on a gently sloping hillside adjacent to the Avon River. Clearing of the hillside began at once and a well was sunk to provide water. A nearby permanent spring supplied additional water when the well almost ran dry at the end of summer. The stream arising from the permanent spring was named Pelham Brook.

A large waterproof tent furnished with tables and stretchers provided temporary accommodation for the ticket-of-leave holders. The tent had been part of the equipment which the sappers had brought with them. For a short period of time, sappers were housed in straw huts which were considered far more suitable as many of the sappers had wives and families. The straw huts were subsequently replaced by other temporary, but more substantial dwellings, made of Swan River mahogany (jarrah) boards.

The first buildings erected included the infirmary, a store and one of the two planned sappers' quarters. It is reported that the wife of one of the sappers was very ill at the time. The infirmary and the sappers' quarters were built of stone using clay as a mortar. A source of lime was yet to be procured. The infirmary was found to be wrongly positioned and, as it had seen little use, the building was converted into a quarter for the commissariat. During the first few months all cooking was carried out on an open rough stone fireplace.

Governor Charles Fitzgerald visited the depot in April 1852 and was very critical of what he found. He thoroughly disapproved of one of the sappers' quarters having been built prior to organizing more permanent accommodation for the ticket-of-leave holders, especially as winter rains were approaching. He demanded that better arrangements be made for cooking meals and ordered a bakery oven be constructed. He also insisted that an infirmary was necessary. Matters were duly attended to. Most importantly, the cook-house and bakery was erected immediately. It was built of mud.

During the coming months, an average of forty ticket-of-leave holders were based at the depot. A good many of these men found work when farmers began seeding crops in the autumn. Ticket-of-leave holders who later found themselves out of work were required to return to the depot where they were once again involved in its construction. Some were fortunate enough to gain paid employment within the depot as cooks, bakers, cleaners and later as police constables. Depot construction was often delayed due to insufficient ticket-of-leave holders being housed at the depot. Nevertheless, the number of men at the hiring depot very much depended on the arrival of ships with convicts on board who, on obtaining their ticket-of-leave, needed to find work. Very few probationary convicts were accommodated at hiring depots during this period of time.

Timber was carted from saw pits at Jimperding. Doors and window frames, floorboards, mantelpieces and skirting boards were prepared on site. Shingles were split from she-oak at bush sites. Offcuts were burnt to produce charcoal for the blacksmith. The road from Jimperding was badly eroded by the carting of timber to the depot.

The blacksmith was most essential to depot construction for it was he who repaired tools, made hinges, nails, bolts and chains when necessary. He also shoed horses, and mended carts and axles. The blacksmith had his own forge and a good well close by.

During the latter part of 1852, a local brick-maker began providing bricks for the depot at an affordable rate. Soon a kiln was erected on site and a source of lime was found. During 1853, the depot at Toodyay began producing its own bricks. However, the warders’ quarters, completed in June 1853, were built of stone with a clay mortar. It had a shingled roof.

The Commissariat was extended in 1853 using bricks on raised stone foundations. The extension measured 35 by 20 feet (10.7 m × 6.1 m). The roof was shingled and the floors were boarded. A wooden stable was added later and a fenced garden put in place. The main depot barracks were built of brick with a shingled roof. The floors were brick-paved. It measured approximately 60 by 25 feet (18.3 m × 7.6 m) and originally housed 60 men. In 1854, this number was increased to 120 by the installation of two tiers of hammocks. The infirmary, new kitchen/cookhouse, blacksmith's forge and superintendent's quarters were made with bricks. All but the blacksmith's shop had shingled roofs. Most of the buildings were white-washed after completion. By 1855, building was nearing completion and sheds and other temporary buildings were being removed.

During 1855, Rev Charles Harper began building a chaplain's quarters on Glebe Land, Lot 111, adjacent to the new depot. Ticket-of-leave labour assisted in its construction. The handsome parsonage was named "Braybrook".

== Enrolled Pensioner Guards ==
Enrolled Pensioner Guards had volunteered as guards on the ships transporting convicts to Western Australia. After an initial period of six months military employment in the colony (later increased to twelve months), the men were released from permanent duty but were expected to attend twelve days exercise per year without additional pay. Each Sunday morning the pensioners appeared for muster and church parade. If necessary, they could be called upon for extra duties of peace-keeping of a military nature thus ensuring additional army presence at a fraction of the cost of military troops. A considerable number of the Pensioner Guards chose to become warders.

Enrolled Pensioner Guards in Toodyay were allocated thirteen allotments situated as closely as possible to the new depot. Suburban allotments, S1-S13, were surveyed by Francis T Gregory during his survey of the depot in 1852. An allowance of ten pounds towards the cost of building a small cottage was made by the government. The allowance compensated for the fact that free grants were no longer permitted and the pensioners were required to contribute ten pounds towards the cost of each grant. The allowance was increased to fifteen pounds in January 1853. Full title was granted after seven years occupation.

Building of the pensioner cottages did not commence until 1854. In the meantime, the pensioners were housed at the depot site at the old Toodyay townsite. Here they shared a number of straw huts and a cottage on Lot R1 and Lot 69. The area became known as "The Barracks" (as distinct from the Toodyay Barracks at Toodyay Town Lot L1). The government had agreed that the Pensioner Barracks would be maintained as long as the Pensioner Guards showed a need for them. Towards the end of winter 1853, large straw huts were erected on four of the new allotments so that some of the men might come and live on their land and cultivate it while their cottages were being built. Of the first six cottages built, three were of mud, one was of brick and two were of stone. Each had a thatched roof and a brick floor. All thirteen cottages were completed by 1856. Most were white-washed.

The years 1853 and 1854 saw the old depot site also being used as an Immigrants’ Depot. The straw huts saw even further use. An average of five men, fifteen women and fourteen children occupied the site. In 1857, both the York and Toodyay Convict Hiring Depot underwent changes which resulted in Pensioner Guards having no further use for the Pensioner Barracks at the old Toodyay townsite. In 1857, Lot 69 and Lot R1, were sold off.

== Road construction ==
As work progressed at the depot sites, Du Cane increasingly turned his attention to road development. Good roads were essential for the carting of goods to and from Toodyay and the transport of wool and grain to Perth and Fremantle. For a while, the Avon Valley was the food bowl of the colony. Early attempts to improve Toodyay Road proved unsuccessful due to poor supervision of the work carried out by the ticket-of-leave holders labouring on-site. However, as work neared completion at the depots, Du Cane was able to introduce out-stations near the hiring depots of Guildford, York and Toodyay. The two largest out-stations were situated on Greenmount Hill. The men based at out-stations were put to work on the roads. The roadwork was continual.

Other roads, such as the Toodyay Valley and the York-Toodyay Roads, were built. However, heavy winter rains often undid much of the progress of the previous year. Maintenance was constant.

== Closure ==
On 30 November 1856, Governor Arthur Kennedy gave the order to close both the York and Toodyay Convict Hiring Depots. Kennedy was seeking to increase efficiency and reduce expense wherever possible as public debt was now considerable. The York and Toodyay Convict Hiring Depots would become receiving depots only. Staff numbers were reduced to a senior assistant superintendent, a sapper and a probationary convict prisoner acting as the hospital orderly. Enrolled Pensioner Guards were no longer required at the depot.

Ticket-of-leave men returning to the depot would henceforth be escorted to the Guildford Convict Hiring Depot. Construction of the Guildford and York Convict Hiring Depots had progressed at much the same rate as that at Toodyay and, by the end of 1855, the entire building project was almost complete. However, in order to receive an increased number of ticket-of-leave holders, new barracks were built to accommodate 200 men at the Guildford depot.

In future, all hiring of labour would be organised from the Guildford depot. Lists of men available for hire were sent to the York and Toodyay depots, as well as the resident magistrates and the police stations in York, Toodyay and Northam. Ticket-of-leave holders, on return to Guildford, were put to work on the roads. Road parties were formed and an overseer, or warder, often a Pensioner Guard, was placed in charge of each party. More complex bridge and road work was directed by a sapper. The number of out-stations on the York and Toodyay Roads was increased. The York and Toodyay out-stations on Greenmount Hill were enlarged and a sapper placed in attendance. Flying road parties dealt with urgently needed repairs.

Depot buildings at Toodyay, such as the barracks, a portion of the warders’ quarters, the kitchen, infirmary, depot store and commissariat store, were retained for possible future use. The police transferred from the old town of Toodyay to the depot site where they occupied the remaining buildings. The lock-up at old Toodyay was closed and a temporary lock-up set up within the depot barracks. The superintendent's quarters were taken over by the incoming resident magistrate, Alfred Durlacher.

By 1860, plans were afoot to subdivide land no longer in use at the depot together with a portion of surrounding Crown land. In August 1859, Assistant Surveyor William Phelps marked out another sixteen suburban allotments, S14-S29, some of which were taken up by Pensioner Guards. The boundaries of the townsite were confirmed. Town Lots 1-20 were surveyed by Phelps in August 1860. Within months, many had been sold. Town Lots 21-58 were marked out by Assistant Surveyor Evans in February 1861.

On 1 October 1860, Kennedy proclaimed that a new town was to be established in the Avon District. It would be named Newcastle in honour of the Duke of Newcastle, the Secretary of State of the Colony.

The 20th Company of Royal Engineers departed the colony in 1862. The removal of the Royal Engineers made it necessary for the colony to undertake the management of its own public works from then on.

== Reopening ==
John Stephen Hampton took office as Governor on 28 February 1862. Comptroller General Henderson, known and respected for his humane management of convicts, resigned from his position in 1863. Hampton had previously held the position of Comptroller General of Convicts in Tasmania, where existed an older convict system far harsher than that introduced to Western Australia. Consequently, the years under Hampton's government saw a reversion to the old system of punishment and harsh discipline.

In 1862, a total of 893 convicts arrived in the colony. The York and Toodyay Convict Hiring Depots were re-opened and its buildings reoccupied. A senior warder was placed in charge accompanied by two assistant warders. Both ticket-of-leave men and probationary convicts were now accommodated at the barracks, their sleeping quarters separated by what was termed the ‘Division’. Both probationary convicts and ticket-of-leave holders in depot were assigned to roadmaking and whatever public works were required in the district. All work was carried out while under the supervision of a warder.

Work soon commenced on the building of a much needed new lock-up. It was designed by Richard Roach Jewell and built using convict labour. Named the Newcastle Lock-up, it was completed on 12 September 1865. It was classified as a gaol on 7 July 1879.

In 1864, Hampton received notice that transportation would be discontinued. Hampton saw to it that the last few years were well served by the convicts yet to arrive. Indeed, most of the 1669 convicts, who arrived between 10 August 1865 and 9 January 1868, were put to work on the roads. The road from Newcastle to Guildford and Perth became one of the best in the colony. Numerous bush camps indicated where the men had been working. The district road system had undergone a huge improvement. The era of convict transportation came to an end on 9 January 1868, when Hougoumont, the last ship to carry convicts to Australia, arrived in Fremantle.

== Final closure ==
On 16 February 1872, Henry Wakeford issued a memorandum for the Toodyay Convict Hiring Depot to be closed. Regardless of the number of protests, it was duly closed and its men transferred elsewhere. The York Convict Hiring Depot remained open until 1874.

After the closure of the Toodyay depot, the remaining buildings were handed over to the government. An increased police force made use of most of them. A women's gaol was erected at the eastern end of the original warders’ quarters.

The front section of the main barracks was converted to a courtroom. The rear section served as a very crowded schoolroom. Eventually, the small schoolroom was replaced when a new school opened in May 1887. The original barracks were demolished in 1897 to make way for the building of a new courthouse. That same year a new police station was ready for occupation. The courthouse stands today and is the location of the offices of the Toodyay Shire Council.

In time, the warders’ quarters, sappers' quarters and commissariat were reduced to ruin. The old wooden stables burnt down in 1890. They were replaced in 1891 by the brick building that is seen today. The superintendent's quarters were demolished in 1963 to make way for the new standard gauge railway line.

The Newcastle Gaol was restored in 1962 and now serves the community as the Newcastle Gaol Museum.

On 6 May 1910, it was declared that Newcastle and the old townsite of Toodyay would henceforth be known as Toodyay and West Toodyay. The modern township of Toodyay was founded on the site of the old Toodyay Convict Hiring Depot.

== See also ==
- Lynton Convict Hiring Depot
