= St John the Baptist Church, Toodyay (1863–1963) =

Church building in Shire of Toodyay, Australia

St John the Baptist Church (former)
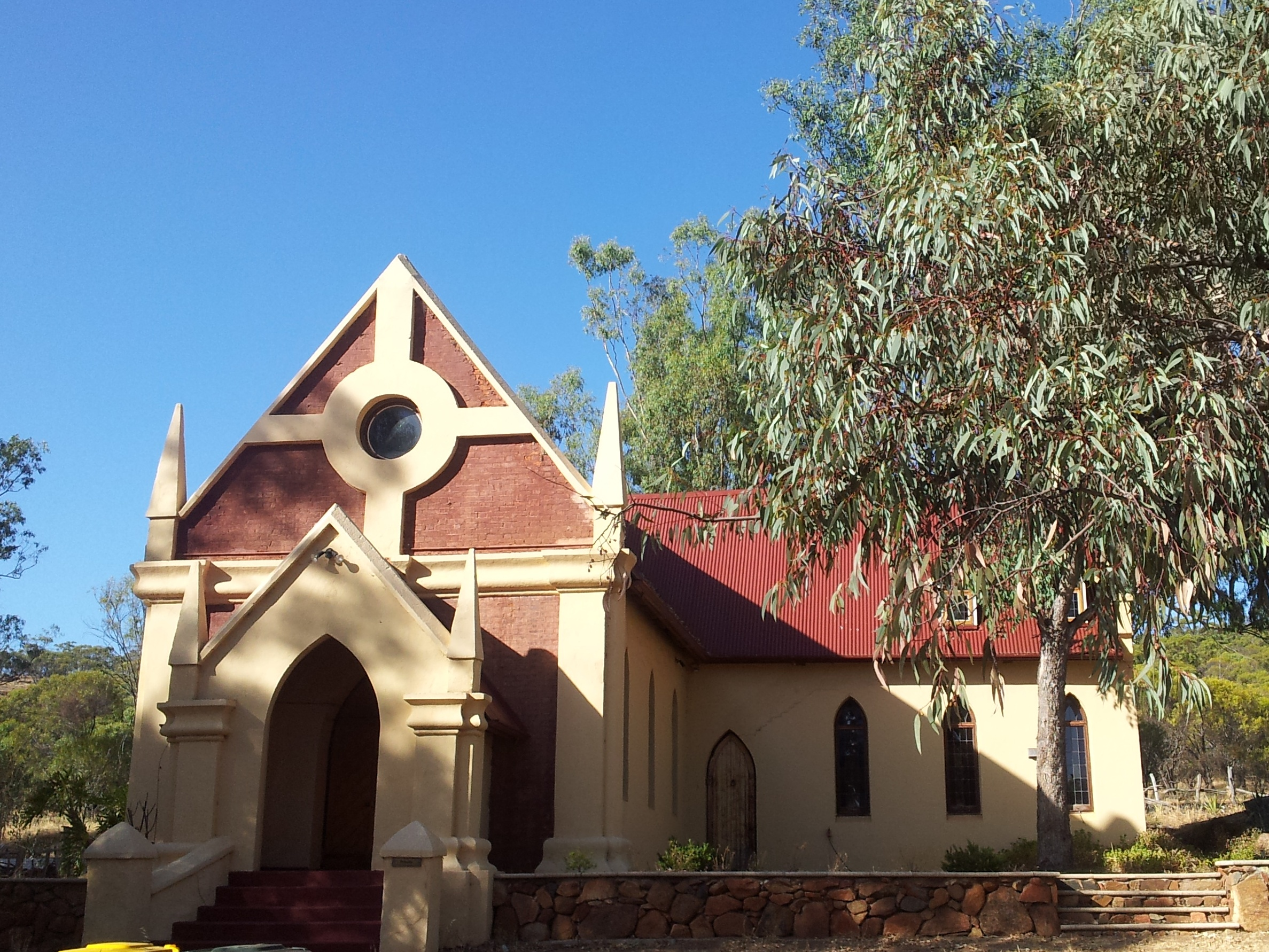
- Former St John the Baptist church building
- St John the Baptist Church (former)
- 31°33′19″S 116°28′28″E
- Address: 35 Stirling Terrace, Toodyay, Western Australia
- Country: Australia
- Previous denomination: Roman Catholic

History
- Status: Church (1863 – 1963); Private use (since 1963)
- Founded: 1863

Architecture
- Architectural type: Church
- Style: Gothic Revival
- Years built: 1863 – 1864
- Completed: 1920
- Closed: 1963

St John the Baptist Church is a former Roman Catholic church located on Stirling Terrace in Toodyay, Western Australia, built 1863–64.

== History ==
Following the move from Old Toodyay to Newcastle, Father Francis Salvado called for tenders to build a new Catholic chapel to replace the Sancta Maria of Old Toodyay.

The foundation stone of the Catholic Church of St John the Baptist was laid in January 1863 by Father Martin Griver. He was assisted by Fr Francis Salvado, the Parish priest, and Fr Venanzio Garrido from the New Norcia mission. By Christmas 1864, the church was completed and had been blessed. The church's transept was used for a time as a school room for Catholic children until 1884 when the Sisters of Mercy came to Toodyay.

In 1920, the west wing was added. In 1963, a new church with the same name was completed, next to St Aloysius (in the Catholic Precinct grounds), and the older church was de-consecrated and sold into private ownership.

This is a rendered brick and corrugated iron building with tall pointed arch lancet windows. It has pointed pinnacles to the entrance porch and main facade. In the gable end a round window has been incorporated into rendered cross.
