= History of Fremantle Prison =

The history of Fremantle Prison, a former Australian prison in Fremantle, Western Australia, extends from its construction as a prison for convicts, using convict labour, in the 1850s, through to its modern-day usage as a tourist attraction. The design for Fremantle Prison was based on the Pentonville Prison in Britain, and it would be the longest, tallest prison cell block in the southern hemisphere. Construction began in 1851, and was completed by the end of 1859. The prison was transferred to the colonial government in 1886 for use for locally sentenced prisoners. Following a Royal Commission held in 1898−99, some changes were made to Fremantle Prison, including knocking down the inner wall between two cells, introducing a prisoner classification system, and constructing internal walls in the main block to create four separate divisions. A new cell block, New Division, was completed in 1907 and occupied in 1908.

Following another Royal Commission investigation 1911, there were some rapid changes in prison policy. A new superintendent with outside experience, Hugh Hann, was appointed, and supported by the newly elected Labor government interested in penal reform. Fremantle Prison was partially used as a military gaol during both world wars. The World War II takeover necessitated the commissioning of Barton's Mill Prison in 1942, which remained opened after the war. Pardelup Prison Farm was another prison outstation established in 1927 to reduce overcrowding at Fremantle. Both facilities were part of reforms made to the prison system, but significant changes to the operation of Fremantle Prison did not begin until the 1960s. Comptroller General Colin Campbell introduced expedient prisoner assessments, officer training, work release programs, and social workers and welfare officers.

The government department in charge of the prison underwent several reorganisations in the 1970s and 1980s, but the culture of Fremantle Prison was resistant to change. Growing prisoner discontent culminated in a 1988 riot with guards taken hostage, and a fire that caused $1.8 million worth of damage. The prison closed in 1991, replaced by the new maximum-security Casuarina Prison. Since 1991, the prison has been conserved as a recognised heritage site on state, national, and World Heritage lists, and various restoration works have been undertaken since the 1990s. New uses have been found for various sections of the prison, including a New Business Enterprise Centre in the New Division cell block, and wedding ceremonies in the prison chapels. It has also become a significant tourist attraction, with guided tours since 1991.

== 19th century ==
=== Background ===
Within a few months of the founding of the Swan River Colony in June 1829 by free-settlers, there was a need for a prison to incarcerate criminals. There was little infrastructure for the settlers, let alone criminals, so the shipwrecked Marquis of Angelsea, just off the coast from South Beach, was used as a makeshift prison. This arrangement was quite arduous for the sheriff, who spent much of his time rowing a small boat, either to transfer prisoners or bring over their meals. It was not until September 1830 that work started on a new prison at the west end of High Street: the twelve-sided Round House on Arthur Head.

While the Swan River Colony was established as a "free settlement", by the 1840s the early reluctance to accept Britain's convicts was overcome. Cheap convict labour could overcome the significant shortage of manpower in the colony. However, the arrival of the first convict ship Scindian on 2 June 1850 was unexpected. While a sailing ship had been sent ahead to inform of the pending arrival of seventy-five convicts, it had been blown off course. The Round House was full to capacity, almost overflowing, so the convicts had to be left on the ship. There was also no prepared accommodation for the warders, pensioner guards, Captain Edward Walcott Henderson, Comptroller General of Convicts, or his clerk, James Manning. Rents for accommodation in Fremantle quickly rose due to the sudden increase in demand, leaving Henderson paying more for his basic lodgings in Fremantle than for his house in London.

Eventually Henderson leased two properties in Essex Street for £250 per year, at the site of the modern-day Esplanade Hotel. He used his convicts to convert the buildings into a temporary prison. Meanwhile, Henderson was looking for a site to build a permanent convict establishment. Whilst he favoured Mount Eliza due to its height, which gave it pleasing vistas and supposedly healthier air, Governor Charles Fitzgerald rejected that proposal. Henderson ultimately settled on the current site on a hill overlooking Fremantle.

=== Construction ===
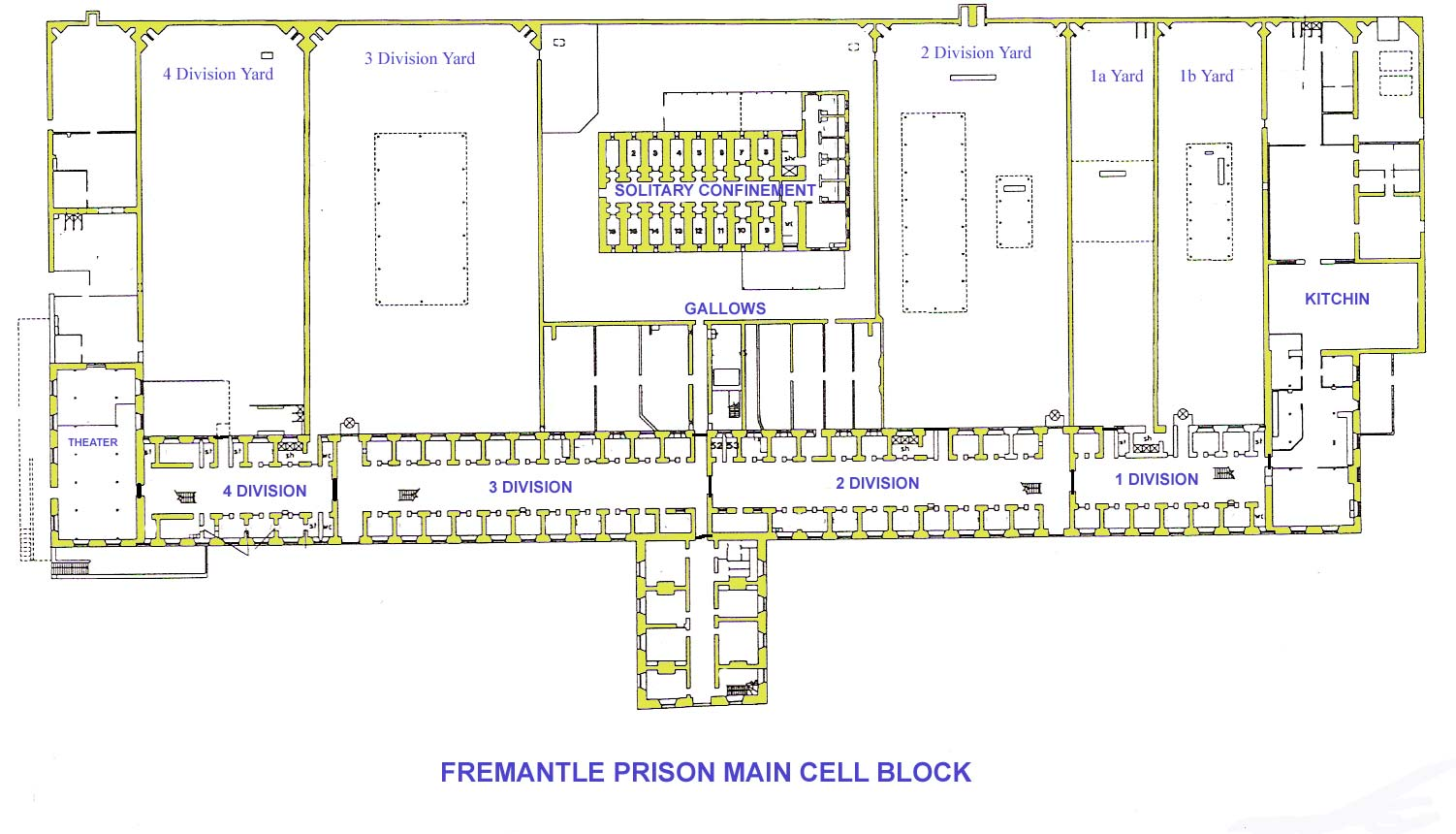
Main Cell Block internal arrangement

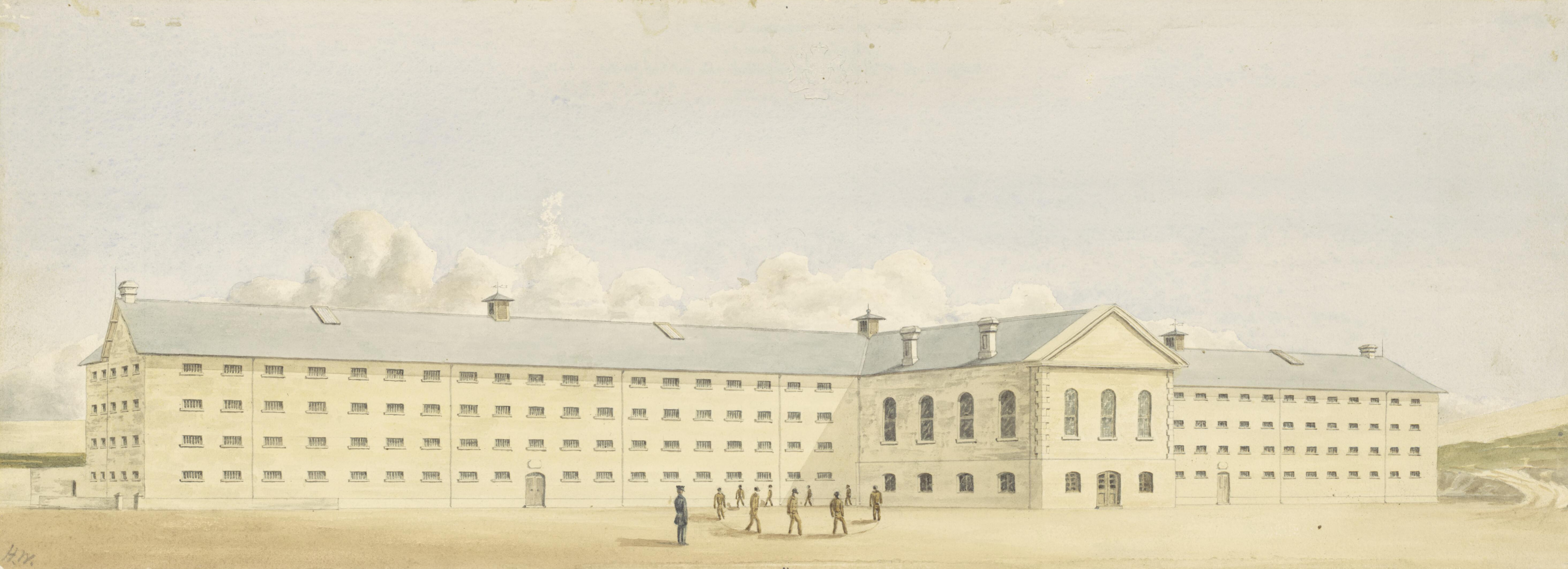
1859 watercolour of the Main Cell Block, by Henry Wray (1824-1900)

Henderson's initial design for Fremantle Prison was based on the Pentonville Prison in Britain. Pentonville, designed by Joshua Jebb, used the "separate system" that kept prisoners in nearly complete isolation, to encourage reflection on their crimes. Jebb reviewed Henderson's plans in 1851, and to reduce the cost, he changed the two diagonal cell blocks that mimicked Pentonville into a four-storey linear structure, which would be the longest, tallest prison cell block in the southern hemisphere. Construction began soon afterwards, supervised by Henderson, Manning, and Royal Engineer lieutenant Henry Wray, who had arrived with another convict ship. Within eighteen months of the Scindian 's arrival, the convict population had grown to almost 1000. In 1855 convicts began to be moved into The Establishment, as the prison was then known as, but the project would not be completed until 1859.

Works rapidly progressed following the arrival of Wray in 1851 with the Royal Engineers, known as the sappers. They trained convicts to work with limestone, which was quarried on-site. Soft stone was used to fill in swamps around Fremantle, and when the better quality stone ran out, quarries were opened at nearby sites such as Arthur Head. The first part to be constructed was a ramp connecting the town to the prison site. The graded and limestone-capped slope would later become Fairbairn Street. Once this was completed, the priority was the construction of accommodation for Henderson and the prison warders to relieve the expense of paying for private lodging. Cottages were built along Henderson Street in 1851, and Henderson's residence, a sizable building known as The Knowle, was completed in 1851 some distance away from the other buildings, in the modern-day grounds of Fremantle Hospital. Houses for the senior staff were also constructed in the 1850s. They were situated at the front of the prison site, along the road then known as The Esplanade (modern day The Terrace).

Workshops, later to be known as the East Workshops, were built to rehabilitate prisoners, and aid in site construction. A blacksmith's shop was constructed in 1852, and a carpenters’ shop was added in 1858. The prison was designed to have other services onsite, including a kitchen, with four boilers, scullery, pantry, cool room and stores; a bakehouse and ovens, with separate stores for flour and bread; as well as a washhouse, laundry and drying room. The building holding these services was completed in 1855. A separate building, a hospital providing medical services, was also planned, but was one of the last to be constructed. The foundations were laid in 1857, but the plans were changed the next year to provide additional space to isolate contagious or dangerous patients. The hospital was finished in 1859.

The prison walls were constructed beginning in 1853, and the site for the Main Cell Block was excavated and levelled. Once the walls were completed in 1855, the only opening was in the western side. This gap was where the gatehouse and associated entry complex was built in 1854 and 1855. The main gate was in place in 1855, while the London-made clock for the top of the structure was installed a year later. In 1856, a mini tornado toppled most of the northern boundary wall, and extensive work was undertaken to rebuild and widen the walls.

The Main Cell Block was built in two stages. Construction of the southern half of the block began in 1853 and most of the masonry works were finished within a year. The section was finished in 1855, including the association wards, a circular jarrah stairwell, and 18 solitary confinement cells in the Refractory Block. However, iron fittings for the guardrails, which had been ordered from England three years previously, still had not arrived. Anxious for the new cell block to start being used, Henderson ordered that doors and rails be made locally, with iron salvaged from convict transport ships. The obvious transition between the local and imported railing now marks the boundary between the southern and northern wings. Prisoners were transferred from the temporary South Beach prison on 1 June 1855.

Construction of the northern wing followed, and by the start of 1857 the foundations were laid, and 40% of the masonry works were done. However, the Crimean War saw the Royal Engineers recalled, leaving only Wray – as Acting Comptroller General, while Henderson was on leave in England – to oversee the prisoners' construction of the building. Much of the work was completed that year, including the remaining masonry, basement, slating the roof, and paving the corridor. While Henderson had wanted single cells, Wray conceded to the Governor's lobbying for additional capacity. He adjusted the design to include some double-width cells housing three prisoners, and triple-width cells holding five prisoners, allowing an additional 40 prisoners to be accommodated. Another measure that increased capacity was the lengthening of the northern wing by six feet (1.8 m). The justification was to mirror the southern wing, which had also been constructed six feet (1.8 m) longer than planned, due to inaccurate surveying. However, this also caused the project to run over budget. Stairs, guard railings, and doors were installed in 1858, and the prison was completed by the end of 1859, with Henderson back from leave and back in charge.

=== Transition to local control ===
During Western Australia's convict era, the prison was known as the Convict Establishment, and was used for convicts transported from Britain. Longer term local prisoners were also held there from 1858, at a cost to the colonial government, as the then-newly constructed Perth Gaol had been handed over to the British imperial government for use as a convict station for short term prisoners. Local prisoners were also kept in the Round House, or on Rottnest Island. In 1876 Perth Gaol was transferred back to local control.

In 1868, penal transportation ceased in Western Australia, and numbers of convicts in the colony gradually declined, down to 83 in the mid-1880s. Due to the great expense of sending these convicts back to Britain, the authorities there negotiated with the colonial government to transfer control of the convicts, as well as the prison complex – demolition was considered too expensive. Early negotiations had broken down, but were restarted in August 1883. Governor Broome set four conditions in February 1884:

- (a) Payment at the rate of £45 per annum for each individual maintained by the Colony on account of the Imperial authorities. Lunatics at £42, as agreed.
- (b) Transfer to the Colony, free of charge, of all Imperial property, including stores.
- (c) All building to be placed in good condition before being handed over; e.g. the prison roof now requires extensive repairs.
- (d) All Imperial Officers to be at once pensioned, and their pensions paid to them irrespective of their re-employment by the Local Government

The last two conditions were the most controversial, though after one and a half years, a compromise was reached: only buildings actually in use would be repaired, and pensions would be paid, but only when the officers actually retired. (Note: Though in the 1890s when these men actually retired, payment was not made willingly, but only after substantial negotiations and delays) The British authorities authorised minimal repairs, to be made as cheaply as possible. The transfer was intended to be completed by the end of 1885, but was not finalised until 31 March 1886.

Once the prison came under the control of the colonial government, it was renamed Fremantle Prison. All prisoners in Perth Gaol were transferred to Fremantle, and from 1887 female prisoners were also imprisoned there. The women were initially held in the hospital building, and then in their own walled-off section of the prison, with cells in the kitchen and wash house buildings. The women were tasked with washing and mending prisoners' clothing, which was considered hard work.

=== First Royal Commission ===
The Western Australian gold rushes of the 1890s resulted in strong economic growth, and a massive increase in population: doubling from almost 50,000 in 1891 to more than 100,000 by 1895, and expanding to 184,000 by 1901. The influx included desperate, dishonest people, from elsewhere in Australia and overseas, and Fremantle Prison was soon overcrowded.

The 1890s also saw a growing public unease with the treatment of prisoners. Newspaper articles on mistreatment on prisoners persisted through the late 1890s, and reform campaigners – most notably former Queensland prisoner Frederick Vosper – called for a Royal Commission. In September 1898 such an enquiry was established by the governor of Western Australia to investigate the colony's penal system. The commission heard evidence from almost 240 witnesses, including a range of prisoners. Three reports were made between December 1898 and June 1899. The first of these dealt with the most recognisable and prominent issues regarding classification, sentencing, prison punishments and offences, diet, and "the special problems of remand, youthful and lunatic prisoners". The second report examined cases where "the exercise of the Royal Prerogative of mercy" might be appropriate, while the final, detailed report covered the remaining evidence presented to the commission. In particular, they considered the philosophy of the prison system – the causes of crime, as well as the types of punishments and their justifications – and in light of this, the practicality of various reform proposals.

The royal commission's third report also dealt with prison administration. It found that the prison was operating under outdated legislation, with little regulation or written guidance, and that there was incertitude in administration – the positions of sheriff and inspector of prisons were held by one man, James Roe, who lived in Perth, with the prison's superintendent, William George, taking on much of the management responsibility.

== 20th century ==
=== Implementation of Royal Commission recommendations ===
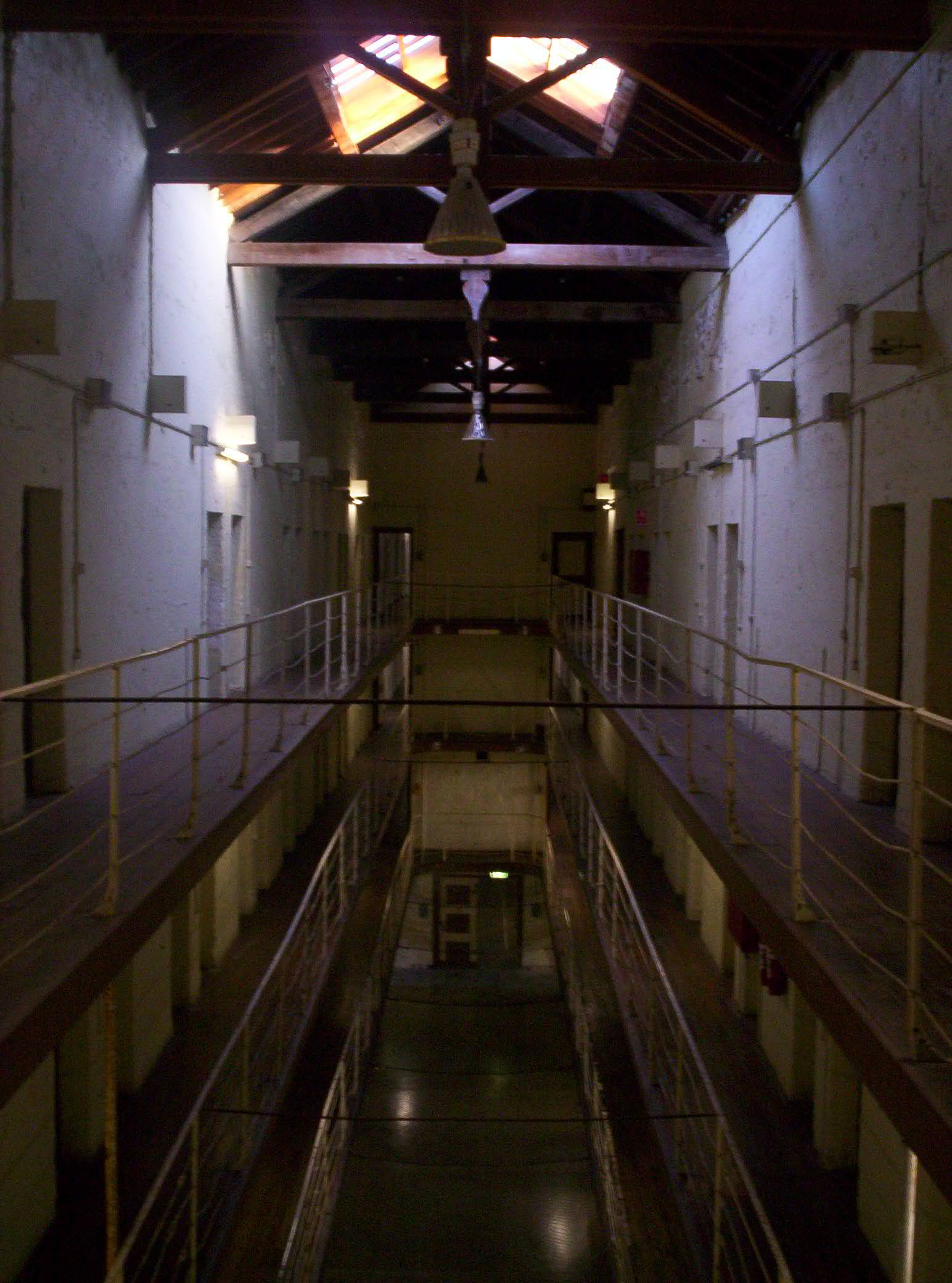
Three Division for "long sentenced and habitual prisoners"

Within a year of the enquiry, almost 100 cells had been enlarged by knocking down the inner wall between two cells, and a classification system was introduced. Internal walls were constructed in the main block, creating four separate divisions:

- One Division, for "debtors, trials and remands, and juveniles" (up to 25 years old)
- Two Division, for "short sentenced first offenders, petty thieves, drunkards, and vagrants"
- Three Division, for "long sentenced and habitual prisoners"
- Four Division, for reformatory prisoners – "cooks, bakers, cleaners, and orderlies"

Following the urgings of Superintendent George and various official enquiries, new workshops were built to provide increased useful employment for prisoners. The western workshops, located between the entry complex and the Female Division, were built from 1900–1901 of squared limestone rubble with openings dressed in brick. An open saw-tooth roof with southern skylights covered the five spaces designed for the five traditional workshops: tailors, bookbinders, shoemakers, mat makers and painters. The two northern shops were later amalgamated by removing the dividing wall.

Further action was not taken until 1902, when new regulations for prison officers were published in the Government Gazette. A new Prison Act was passed in 1903, replacing sixteen previous acts. It provided for classification of prisoners, provision of adequate work for prisoners, and the creation of the position of comptroller general of prisons, to assume the functions the sheriff had undertaken as inspector of prisons. While in theory the passing of the act should have been a landmark moment in prison reform, this did not eventuate. The legislation left much of the changes to executive regulation, at the discretion of the governor, and was described by the media as a feeble document. Other problems included Fremantle Prison's inscrutability for classification, due to its design, and that the sheriff was allowed to hold the office of comptroller general of prisons, effectively making it no more than a change in name.

New Division, completed in 1907 and occupied in 1908, resulted from the 1899 Commissioners' report recommending a modified version of the separate system. The new division, built by contractors with stone from quarries at Rottnest Island, was similar in design to Henderson's 1850s structure, but was constructed in an L-shape, was only three stories tall, and had electric lighting, with cables laid underground for safety as well as aesthetics. It also differed in its use from the main cell block. Unlike the earlier building, prisoners remained continuously in their somewhat enlarged cells, except when exercised in separate yards watched by a warder in a central tower. The 30 unit radial, panopticon-style exercise yard became known as the "cage". The concept of the separate system was already over sixty years old when introduced to Fremantle.

=== Second Royal Commission ===
By 1908 there were calls for another Royal Commission into Western Australia's penal system. Truth newspaper repeatedly criticised Fremantle Prison between 1903 and 1910, with much of the blame placed on the comptroller general and superintendent. Allegations included that new offenders still were not separated from older ones, that regulations were systemically broken, and that prisoners were not paid for the work they did.

In 1911 another Royal Commission investigation into Fremantle Prison recommended closing the facility. Its report was ignored by the state government, which was more concerned with building infrastructure such as roads and schools, rather than the plight of its prisoners. However, there was a rapid change in prison policy, with the appointment of a superintendent, Hugh Hann, who had recent English and colonial experience, and the election of a Labor government with members interested in penal reform. One immediate result was the dismantling of the separate system at Fremantle Prison and the demolition of the separate exercise yards in 1912. It shares with Katingal Special Security Unit in New South Wales the record for brevity of use of a permanent Australian penal structure.

=== Military gaol ===
Fremantle Prison was partially used as a military gaol during both world wars. During World War II, the Australian Army took over the prison and used it as a military prison from 1940 until 1946. It was used for the detention of military personnel, as well as an internment centre – one of more than 50 across Australia holding a combined total of more than 12,000 enemy aliens and prisoners of war. Fremantle accommodated up to 400 military prisoners and up to 160 civilian prisoners by October 1945. The takeover necessitated the commissioning of Barton's Mill Prison in 1942. After the war Fremantle Prison returned to civilian use and a variety of ad hoc structures were erected on and below the knoll terraces.

=== Reform ===
Prison outstations were established as part of the reforms in the 20th century, and to reduce the overcrowding at Fremantle. Pardelup Prison Farm opened in 1927, near Mount Barker, while Barton's Mill, though planned to be a temporary measure, remained open as a prison after World War II. Pardelup operated as a working farm, with a large-scale dairy, cattle and pig raising, and crops, and Barton' Mill prisoners cut timber to supply hospitals, houses, and the Goldfields Water Supply Scheme's pumping station at Mundaring. In both cases, the only aspects resembling a prison were the presence of guards, and the compulsion to remain there – enforced by the remoteness of the facilities and the integrity of prisoners chosen to be transferred there. Escapees were generally punished with extended sentences at the harsher Fremantle Prison, which had little change over the four decades from 1920 to 1960.

Significant reform to Western Australia's prison system – new prisons, legislation, and administration – did not begin until the 1960s, lagging behind those that occurred in Europe, North America, and elsewhere in Australia after World War II. Seven new prisons were opened between 1960 and 1971, including a maximum-security facility at Albany, following an abrupt increase in the prisoner population in the mid- to late-1950s. In 1970, female prisoners and staff were moved from Fremantle to the new Bandyup Women's Prison, built at Bandyup on the outskirts of Perth. The female division, which had been the only women's prison in Western Australia, was subsequently used for male prisoners. New legislation regarding probation, parole, and convicted drunkards was also introduced, which provided alternatives to imprisonment. With these new arrangements, and more variety in prisons and prison types, a classification board was set up in 1963 to assess prisoners.

a place for rehabilitation and re-education ... where people can retain their identity and, if necessary, create a new identity

— Comptroller General Colin Campbell's view of prisons, 1966

The appointment of Colin Campbell as comptroller general in 1966 fostered substantial changes within Fremantle Prison itself. A university graduate with a major in psychology, he was the first senior appointment from outside the Western Australian prison system in almost half a century. He viewed prison as "a place for rehabilitation and re-education ... where people can retain their identity and, if necessary, create a new identity". One of his first changes was to make himself chairman of the classification committee, and clear its backlog of prisoners awaiting assessment through more frequent committee meetings. Campbell also established an officer training school, as well as an assessment centre, where new prisoners worked, supervised by specially trained officers who gave reports to the classification committee. Following international trends, Campbell introduced work release and community service programs, training programs for both prisoners and officers, and social workers and welfare officers to assist prisoners and their families during and after their imprisonment.

=== Reorganisations ===
The 1970s and 1980s saw numerous changes at a departmental level, and adjustments in the roles and responsibilities of the state's prison system. In 1971, within the midst of Campbell's reforms, the Prisons Department was renamed the Department of Corrections, and restructured into three divisions: Treatment and Training Branch, Correctional Psychiatric Branch, and Establishments Branch. The position of comptroller general was replaced with director of the department. William Kidston succeeded Campbell following his death in 1977. Amidst growing prisoner numbers, Kidston oversaw a shift in policy from "paternalistic rehabilitation" of prisoners to merely providing opportunities for rehabilitation. The department was reorganised, with the Treatment and Training Branch becoming the Support Services Branch, with other branches for administration, institutions, and prison industries.

A new Prisons Act was passed in 1981, which updated the 1903 act and its eleven amendments with modern philosophies and practices – codifying departmental orders, instructions, and policy documents. The act was, however, slanted towards prisoner management and safety, as the government and opposition were mindful of public opinion, and the perception of lax security at Fremantle. The result was legislation criticised by the Criminal Lawyers Association, academics, and newspapers, including for minimal welfare provisions that did little to ensure prisoner welfare. The department was at the same time renamed the Prisons Department once more, to emphasise imprisonment as its primary responsibility.

Ian Hill became director of the Prisons Department in 1983, and reorganised the department several times, striving for greater "economy, efficiency, and effectiveness". This included a merge with the Office of Probation and Parole in 1986, resulting in the Department of Corrective Services. By 1987, the department's welfare division was disbanded, with prison officers made responsible for prisoner welfare. Whilst the changes of the 1980s were effective throughout most of Western Australia's prison system, the culture of Fremantle Prison was resistant to change. Growing prisoner discontent eventually culminated in the 1988 prison riot.

=== Later enquiries ===
In 1972 a Royal Commission was appointed to investigate mistreatment of and discrimination against Aboriginal prisoners. Its 1973 report found that there was not "any appreciable discrimination against aboriginies or part aboriginies"; however, racial stereotypes are present throughout the report, testimony of Aboriginal prisoners was considered unreliable, and the conclusion was predictable as a "validation of the actions or policies of ... government officials". The report made recommendations regarding various aspects of prison life, including additional, independent, trained welfare officers.

In 1988, an enquiry investigated the Fremantle Prison riot that occurred at the start of the year. The report suggested that little evidence supported the escape plan theory reported by the media, but that the riot was largely the result of an incident of that morning involving the mistreatment of a prisoner and his subsequent release into Three Division yard.

== Closure ==
The state government made the decision to decommission Fremantle Prison in 1983, but it remained in operation until 30 November 1991. Prisoners were moved to a new metropolitan maximum security prison at Casuarina and the prison was transferred to the Building Management Authority. (Note: Later the Department of Contract and Management Services, now the Department of Finance - Building Management and Works) There were divergent views in the community over the site's future: some wanted it demolished and redeveloped, or turned into gardens with a small monument; others wanted the historic site to be preserved, but were opposed to turning the misery of prisoners into entertainment for tourists. The ultimate decision was for conservation of the prison, but allowing for the buildings to be adapted for reuse by the community.

The Fremantle Prison Trust was established in 1992 to advise the Minister for Works on the management of the site. Various new uses were found for different parts of the prison, including wedding services in the chapels, a Coastal Business Centre in New Division, and the Fremantle Children's Literature Centre in the hospital; the prison also became a tourist attraction. A private company organised the tourist operation for ten years under contract, until the end of 2001; subsequently, the state government took control. A hostel providing short-stay accommodation in the women's prison opened in May 2015.

== Conservation ==
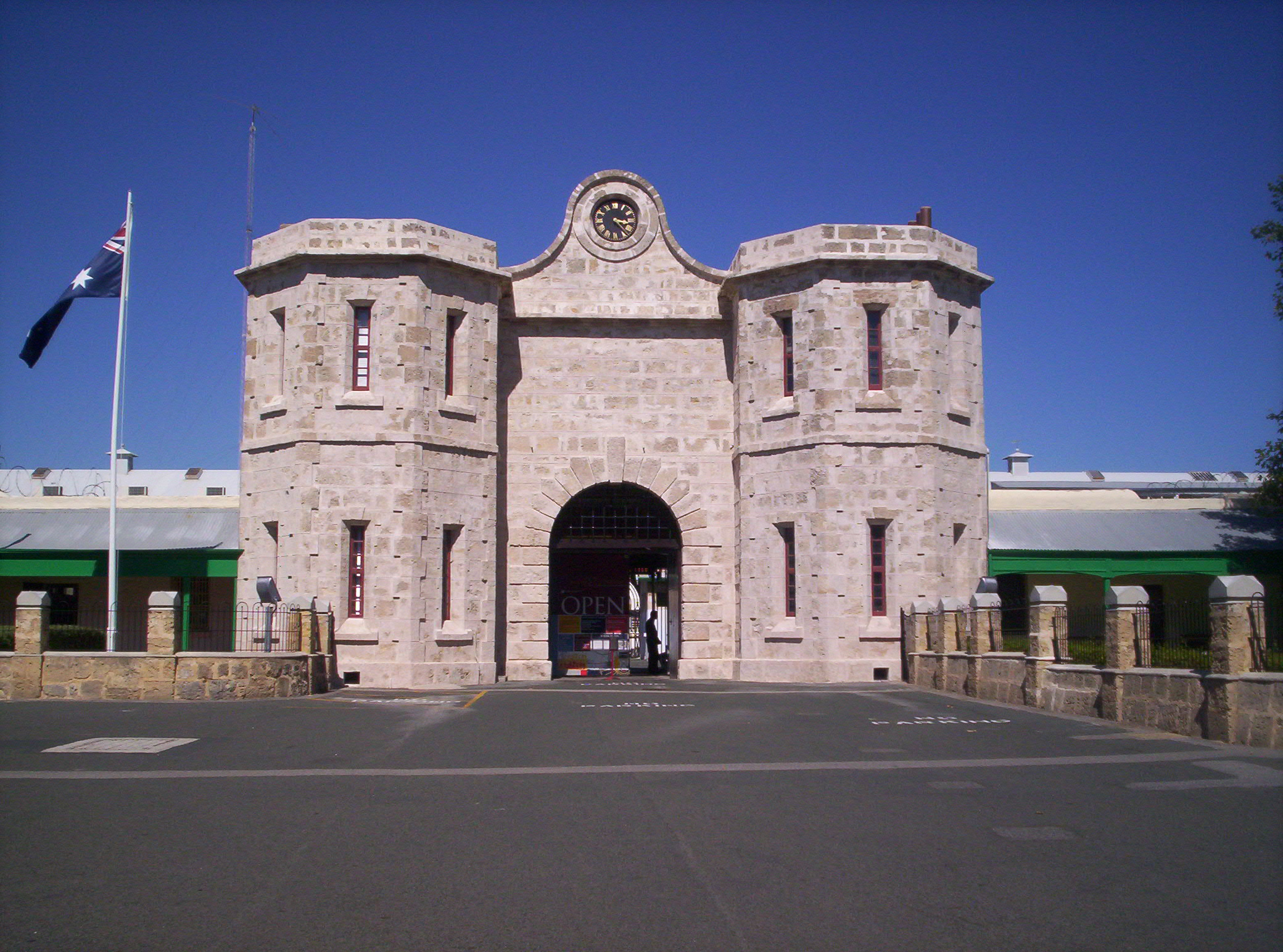
The newly restored prison gatehouse in 2005

=== Heritage listing ===
Fremantle Prison was listed in the Western Australian Register of Historic Places as an interim entry on 10 January 1992, and as a permanent entry on 30 June 1995. Described as the best preserved convict-built prison in the country, it became the first building in Western Australia to be listed on the Australian National Heritage List, in 2005. The Australian Federal Heritage Minister, Senator Ian Campbell, stated that it would be included in a nomination of eleven convict areas to become World Heritage Sites. Five years later, the prison was one of eleven former convict sites in Australia inscribed on the UNESCO World Heritage List in 2010 as the Australian Convict Sites.

The process of obtaining World Heritage listing focused historical interpretation and conservation efforts on the prison's convict era, at the expense of its more recent history. These included its use as an internment centre during World War II, and the imprisonment of Aboriginal prisoners. The prioritisation of convict heritage was evident from the first conservation plans from before the prison closed. This aspect became more and more important through later plans by James Semple Kerr, authored in 1992 and reviewed in 1998, and subsequently in the state government's masterplan, released in December 2000. The convict-era focus is reflected in the branding of the tourist experience as "Fremantle Prison – the Convict Establishment", and through restorations which, while necessary to prevent damage and deterioration, strip away the site's recent history.

=== Restoration ===
Various parts of Fremantle Prison have had restoration works undertaken since the 1990s, to halt the deterioration of the buildings and preserve them for the future. A total of $800,000 was spent between 1996/97 and 1998/99 on works that included restoring the facade of the Anglican chapel. In 2005, work was undertaken on the restoration of the prison gatehouse area. Non-original rendering was removed and the original stonework was revealed. Work was also completed on the tunnels during 2005/06, and the main cell block was restored with an eighteen-month, $1.9 million project in 2006 and 2007. The gallows room was restored in 2013 to conditions at the time of the last execution, in 1964.

== See also ==
- Architecture of Fremantle Prison
- List of executions at Fremantle Prison
- Riots at Fremantle Prison
- Staff and prisoners of Fremantle Prison
