= Riots at Fremantle Prison =

Disturbances at Fremantle Prison in Western Australia

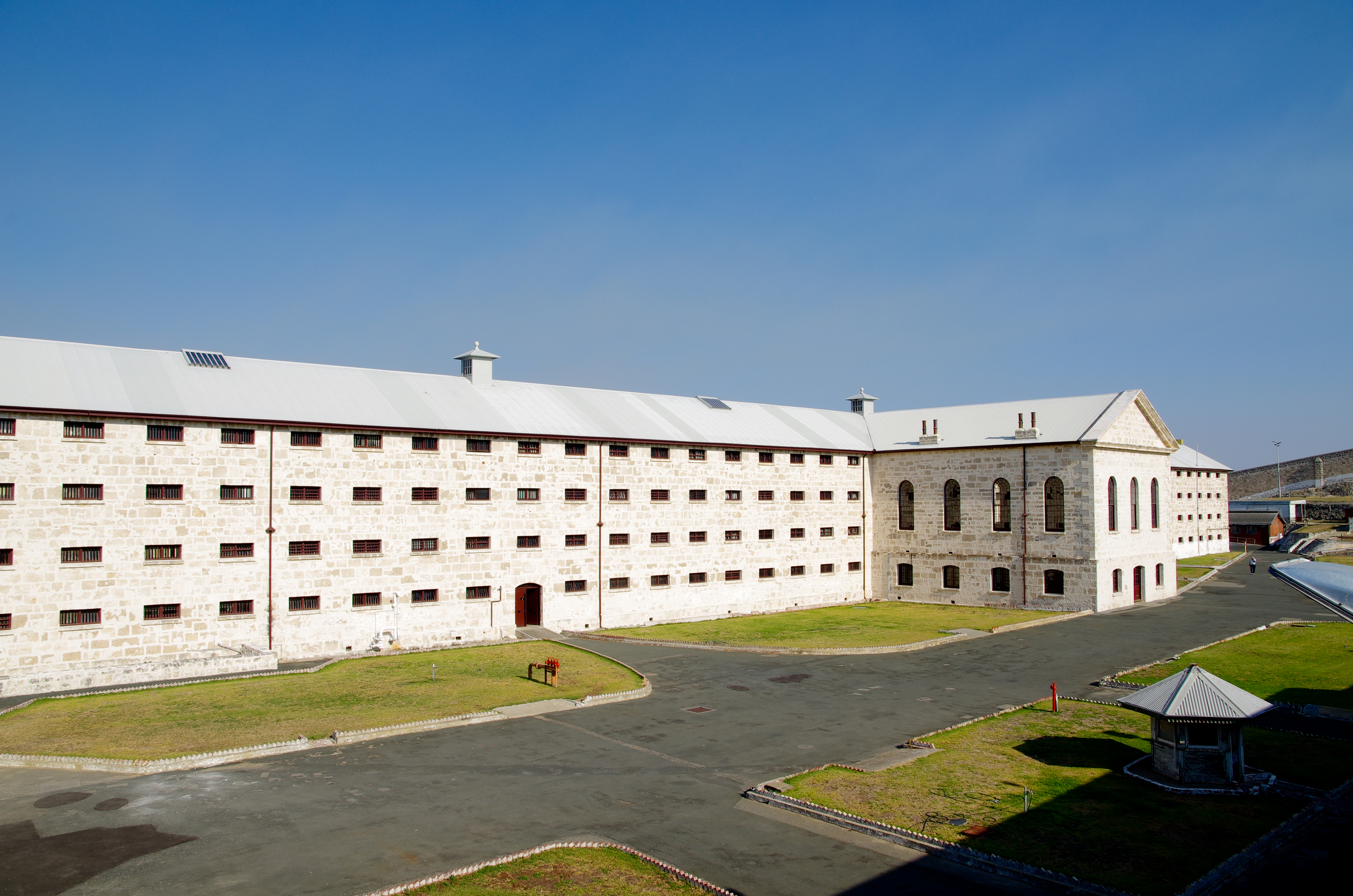
Fremantle Prison

Numerous riots and disturbances at Fremantle Prison have occurred over its years of operation. Constructed in the 1850s using convict labor and modeled after Pentonville Gaol, Fremantle Prison served as Western Australia's primary maximum security facility for male offenders. Despite some reforms prompted by Royal Commissions in 1898−99 and 1911, substantial changes to the prison's operation didn't commence until the 1960s. Among the earliest incidents was one in 1854, while major riots took place in 1968 and 1988, causing significant damage to the prison.

== Background ==
Fremantle Prison is a former Australian prison in Fremantle, Western Australia, constructed as a prison for convicts, using convict labour, in the 1850s. The design for Fremantle Prison was based on the Pentonville Prison in Britain, and it would be the longest, tallest prison cell block in the southern hemisphere. Construction began in 1851, and was completed by the end of 1859. The prison was transferred to the colonial government in 1886 for use for locally sentenced prisoners. Following a Royal Commission held in 1898−99, some changes were made to Fremantle Prison, including knocking down the inner wall between two cells, introducing a prisoner classification system, and constructing internal walls in the main block to create four separate divisions. A new cell block, New Division, was completed in 1907 and occupied in 1908.

Following another Royal Commission investigation 1911, there were some rapid changes in prison policy. A new superintendent with outside experience, Hugh Hann, was appointed, and supported by the newly elected Labor government interested in penal reform. Fremantle Prison was partially used as a military gaol during both world wars. The World War II takeover necessitated the commissioning of Barton's Mill Prison in 1942, which remained opened after the war. Pardelup Prison Farm was another prison outstation established in 1927 to reduce overcrowding at Fremantle. Both facilities were part of reforms made to the prison system, but significant changes to the operation of Fremantle Prison did not begin until the 1960s. Comptroller General Colin Campbell introduced expedient prisoner assessments, officer training, work release programs, and social workers and welfare officers.

The government department in charge of the prison underwent several reorganisations in the 1970s and 1980s, but the culture of Fremantle Prison was resistant to change. Growing prisoner discontent eventually culminated in the 1988 prison riot. The prison closed in 1991, replaced by the new maximum-security Casuarina Prison.

== Incidents ==
=== 1854 ===
There was a riot in 1854, after the Roman Catholic chaplain was suspended for accusing his Protestant counterpart of being in league with the devil, and other inappropriate comments. Prisoners were upset that mass was not being performed, and were adamant that their chaplain should return. Warders attempting to return the ringleaders to their cells were overrun by other prisoners, and so the prison authorities had to resort to calling in the military to regain control. Punishment of 100 lashes was subsequently administered to each of five of the rioting prisoners.

=== 1898 ===
In late 1898, there was a riot described as a "gaol mutiny" by The Sunday Times. A prisoner, Charles Street, refused to undertake work breaking stones, as he had not been sentenced to hard labour. He protested, and used foul language, for which he was arrested and charged. While he was incarcerated, 75 prisoners mutinied, refusing to follow any instructions until Street's release. Superintendent George accepted an apology by Street to resolve the incident. The Sunday Times derided George for conceding to the demands of the mutineers, rather than using "armed force and … the loss of human life if necessary".

=== 1902 ===
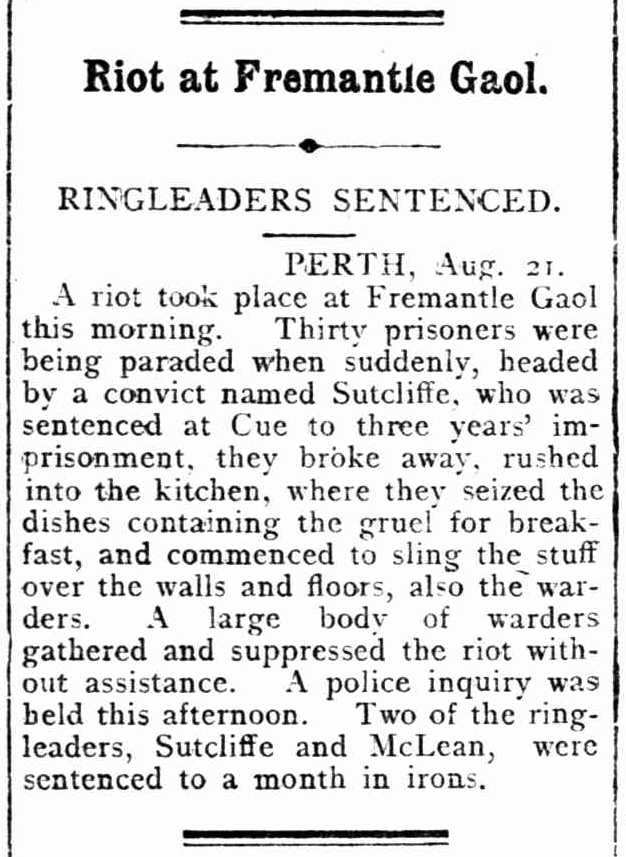
Newspaper article about a 1902 riot

On the morning of 21 August 1902, a riot occurred when a group of thirty prisoners bolted away from their guards. Dissatisfied with the quality of their food, particularly that morning's gruel, they rushed into the kitchen and proceeded to fling dishes and food over the walls, as well as the warders. A large group of warders managed to subdue the prisoners. Thirteen of the instigators were each sentenced to a month in irons in close confinement, and nineteen other prisoners received one month in close confinement.

=== 1909 ===
A race riot in Fremantle Prison was reported in May 1909. The incident began with an Afghan prisoner, after accusing a Caucasian prisoner of pushing him, was hit in the eye. Later that day, one prisoner got into an argument with another prisoner, a Filipino, who was bashed with a stool. He was also attacked by a third prisoner as warders led him away. There were reportedly recurring incidents involving Asian prisoners at the time.

=== 1930 ===
A prisoner strike occurred on 27 March 1930, but was resolved without any violence. The prisoners were unhappy with the quantity of the food given to them, and that short-sentenced prisoners were not allocated a tobacco ration, although the Mirror newspaper suspected that the ringleaders just wanted a win over the authorities. At 7:30 pm, around eighty prisoners refused to move from the exercise yard until their grievances were addressed. The prisoners made a commotion that lasted throughout the night, with "singing, cursing, shouting, … determined that the world should know [of their strike]".

The stand-off continued until the next morning, however the prisoners did not attempt to break out or enact their threats of burning down the prison. Prison authorities did not engage with any violence, instead using the tactic of "starving them into submission". At the first lunchtime call, twenty prisoners gave up the protest, and the rest soon followed. No weapons were found amidst the prisoners.

=== 1968 ===
A riot occurred on 4 June 1968, precipitated by the serving of allegedly contaminated food to prisoners the previous evening. Other factors that contributed were the rudimentary and deplorable state of sanitation and personal cleanliness facilities, tougher sentencing introduced with the Parole Act of 1964 that did not take rehabilitation potential into account, and the overcrowded and purposeless life of many prisoners. When the work bell was rung at 1 pm, prisoners rebelled; refusing to go back to work, they assembled themselves in the exercise yards. The prison superintendent Mr Thorpe negotiated with two deputations of prisoners. As well as better food, they demanded single cells and the dismissal of specific wardens.

After approximately three hours, the negotiations broke down, and that night's evening meal was withheld. That caused the prisoners to riot, breaking fittings, injuring three prison officers, three prisoners, and a detective. Additional police and wardens arrived at 5 pm, but took seven hours to subdue the prisoners, with the last of them locked in their cells just after midnight. The extent of the damage was in the order of $200 to $300. To relieve the overcrowding and reduce prisoner agitation, around 60 men who had not taken part in the riot were transferred to prisons at Albany, Geraldton, Karnet, and Barton's Mill. However, other improvements could not be undertaken without funding from the state government, which did not consider prison reform a priority.

=== 1971 ===
In October 1971, there was an incident with prisoners refusing to return to their cells. They were protesting over low gratuity payments. A riot was avoided, with the situation resolved after half an hour. However, both Director Colin Campbell and the Jail Officers' Union were, in January 1972, worried that overcrowding could result in another riot within six months.

=== 1988 ===
On 4 January 1988, despite the 42 °C (108 °F) heat, officers decided prisoners should remain outside in the exercise yards in the afternoon. As division 3 prisoners were let inside at around 4 pm, a voice exclaimed "Let's take 'em", and simultaneously, guards were splashed with boiling water, usually used for making tea. A horde of prisoners stormed the cellblock, attacking the guards with whatever makeshift weapons they could find. This resulted in pandemonium; prisoners rushed along landings, overpowering officers and taking them hostage, while at the same time, other prisoners darted between cells, starting fires. The prisoners withdrew to the exercise yard, taking 15 hostages, as flames quickly overran the building, spread into the rafters, and caused the roof to collapse.

Police negotiators communicated with the ring leaders, and by nightfall all but five hostages had been released. Meanwhile, the fire brigade had trouble bringing the inferno in the main cell block under control, as the prison's gate was too narrow for their trucks, and prisoners impeded their endeavours by throwing debris at them. The prisoners' leaders made three demands: a meeting with Attorney General Joe Berinson, access to the media, and a guarantee of no retribution afterwards. The next morning, after 19 hours, the hostages were released, even though only the third demand had been met. Prisoners did, however, have an opportunity to communicate with the press during the siege, as the riot was a live media event with television helicopters filming from overhead.

Although there were no deaths, the fire caused A$1.8 million of damage, and officers were injured. In the aftermath of the riot, there was extensive media attention on Fremantle Prison, and investigative journalists uncovered prior warnings to the prison authorities of the risk of such an event. The government hastily initiated an enquiry into the incident, and a report was completed within six weeks. A trial involving thirty-three prisoners charged over the riot was also held, the largest in the state's history, which resulted in extended sentences for the prisoners.

== See also ==
- Architecture of Fremantle Prison
- List of executions at Fremantle Prison
- History of Fremantle Prison
- Staff and prisoners of Fremantle Prison
- Civil disturbances in Western Australia

== Sources ==
- Murray, Sandra (2009). Gregory, Jenny; Gothard, Janice (eds.). Historical Encyclopedia of Western Australia (PDF). Crawley: UWA Publishing. ISBN 978-1-921401-15-2. OCLC 405500003. OL 45266821M. Wikidata Q5773872.
