= Architecture of Fremantle Prison =

Building design of Fremantle Prison

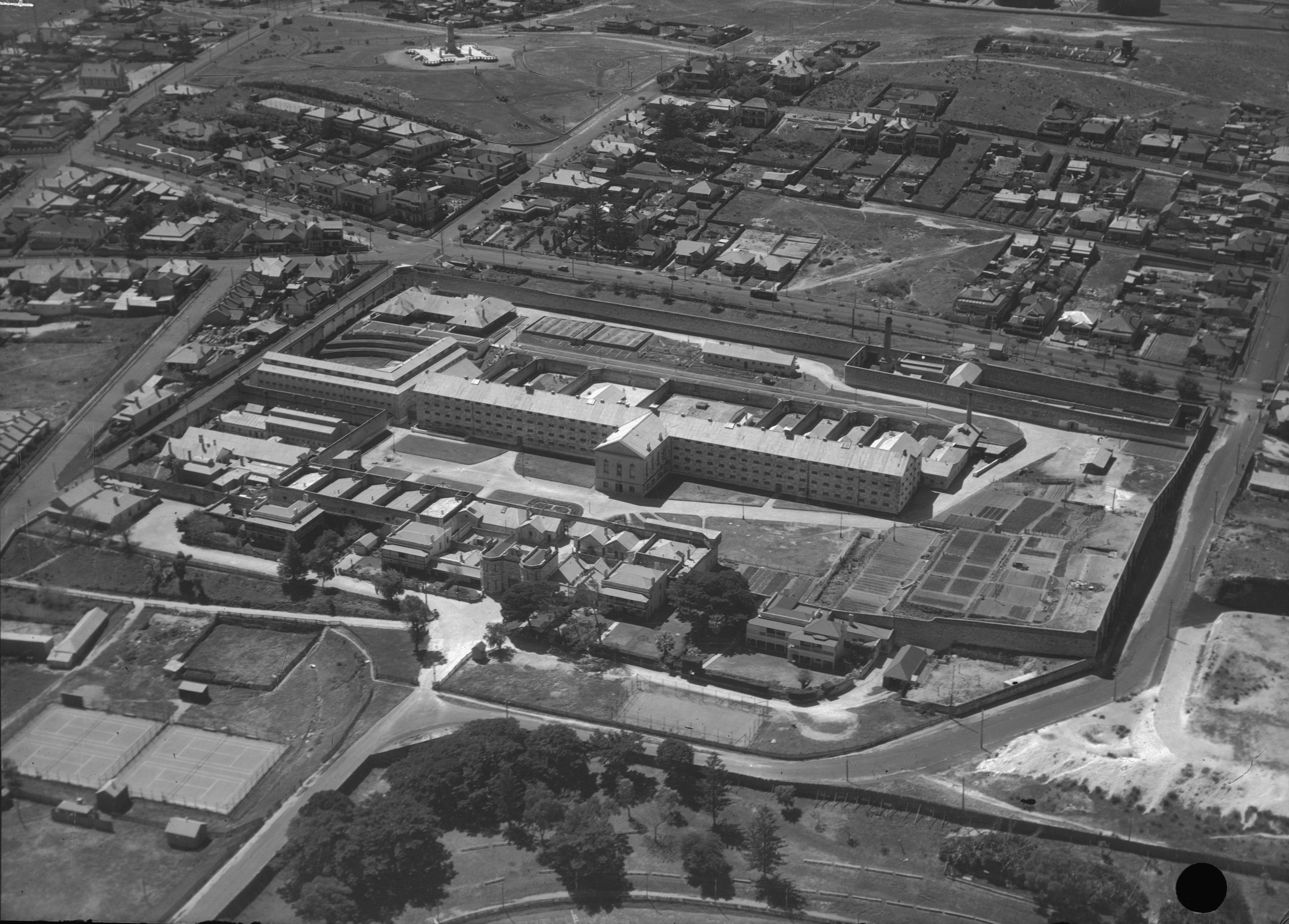
Aerial view of Fremantle Prison (1935)

The architecture of Fremantle Prison includes the six-hectare (15-acre) site of the former prison on The Terrace, Fremantle, in Western Australia. Limestone was quarried on-site during construction, and the south-western corner (the South Knoll) and eastern portion of the site are at a considerably higher ground level. The Fremantle Prison site includes the prison cell blocks, gatehouse, perimeter walls, cottages, tunnels, and related infrastructure.

The Main Cell Block is the longest and tallest cell range in Australia, and a dominating feature of the prison. New Division, constructed between 1904 and 1907, continues the façade alignment of the main block. Service buildings were converted into the separate Women's Prison. Fremantle Prison is surrounded by limestone perimeter walls, while a two-storey limestone gatehouse, with a central clock, presents an imposing entrance. North and south of the gatehouse, on The Terrace, are several cottages and houses – three of which are built in Victorian style in contrast to the Georgian style of the others.

A tunnel network exists under the prison, built to provide the prison, and later the town of Fremantle, with a supply of fresh water. Other elements of the site include the hospital building, prisoner workshops, open spaces, and a limestone ramp on the axis of the gatehouse, heading down towards the port area of Fremantle. Archaeological zones and sub-surface remains of varying levels of significance are found throughout the area of the convict grant.

== Background ==
Fremantle Prison dates from the early years of European settlement, when it was constructed as the centre of the British Imperial Convict Establishment in Western Australia. While the colony was established as a "free settlement" in 1829, by the 1840s the early reluctance to accept Britain's convicts was overcome. Cheap convict labour could overcome the significant shortage of manpower in the colony. However, the arrival of the first convict ship Scindian on 2 June 1850 was unexpected. While a sailing ship had been sent ahead to inform of the pending arrival of seventy-five convicts, it had been blown off course. The Round House was full to capacity, almost overflowing, so the convicts had to be left on the ship. There was also no prepared accommodation for the warders, pensioner guards, Captain Edward Walcott Henderson, Comptroller General of Convicts, or his clerk, James Manning. Rents for accommodation in Fremantle quickly rose due to the sudden increase in demand, leaving Henderson paying more for his basic lodgings in Fremantle than for his house in London. Eventually Henderson leased two properties in Essex Street for £250 per year, at the site of the modern-day Esplanade Hotel. He used his convicts to convert the buildings into a temporary prison. Meanwhile, Henderson was looking for a site to build a permanent convict establishment. Whilst he favoured Mount Eliza (now known as Kings Park) due to its height, which gave it pleasing vistas and supposedly healthier air, Governor Charles Fitzgerald rejected that proposal. Henderson ultimately settled on the current site on a hill, in a raised and dominant position overlooking the port city of Fremantle.

== Site ==
Fremantle Prison buildings, wall, and tunnels. North is at the left side of this diagram.
Legend
Cell blocks
Workshops
Hospital
Reservoir building
Tunnels
Wall
Gatehouse and houses on The Terrace

=== Description ===
Fremantle Prison was built on a land grant of about 36 acres (15 ha) from limestone quarried on-site, and timber cut from Mount Eliza. The site exhibits considerable changes in ground level, natural and man-made, as a result of its location and former use. The ground level is considerably higher in the south-western corner of the site with what remains of the natural landform, formerly known as Church Hill, now referred to as the South Knoll. The eastern portion of the site is also considerably higher than the ground level established around the main cell block. It is a comparatively level terrace and is the highest part of the precinct.

Fremantle Prison comprises substantially intact convict era structures, including the limestone perimeter walls of exceptional heritage significance. Other structures, dating from the time the precinct was in use as a colonial and state prison, are also significant. The convict era complex includes the 1859 main cell block, chapel and wards, yards and refractory cells; perimeter walls, gate house complex and prison officer residences on the Terrace; service buildings and hospital; south-eastern workshops; ramp access tramway (Fairbairn Street) and Henderson Street Warder's Cottages. Other elements which contribute to the site's overall heritage significance include the western workshops (1900); new division (1907); and conversion of service building to the female division and the addition of an eastern range (1889–1909).

=== Layout ===
A 4.6-metre-tall (15 ft) boundary wall encloses the prison grounds, with a gatehouse in the centre of the western wall, facing The Terrace. Other roads bounding the site are Knutsford Street to the north, Hampton Road to the east, and Fothergill Street to the south. Cottages, which housed prison workers and officials, are located outside the wall either side of the gatehouse. Inside the walls, the parade ground is located east of the gatehouse. Beyond it is the Main Cell Block at the centre of the site, which contains two chapels. North of the main block is New Division, and west of that, in the north-western corner, is the former Women's Prison, previously the cookhouse, bakehouse and laundry. The hospital building stands in the north-eastern corner, while the former workshops are located in the south-eastern corner, as well as to the north of the gatehouse. A system of tunnels, constructed to provide fresh water from an aquifer, runs under the eastern edge of the site.

=== Archaeology ===
Archaeological zones and sub-surface remains of varying levels of significance are found throughout the area of the convict grant. In particular, the sites of the three former cottages to the east of the perimeter wall in the Hampton Road reserve, the site of the former 'cage' in the New Division courtyard and the features upon and under the knoll terraces. Other site features include those associated with the water supply system constructed in the 1890s: the brick-vaulted underground reservoir, the associated pumping station, a complex series of rock cut shafts, drives, weirs and the one-kilometre (0.6 mi) tunnel network. Graffiti and a tablet records the progress of the excavators.

== Walls and gatehouse ==
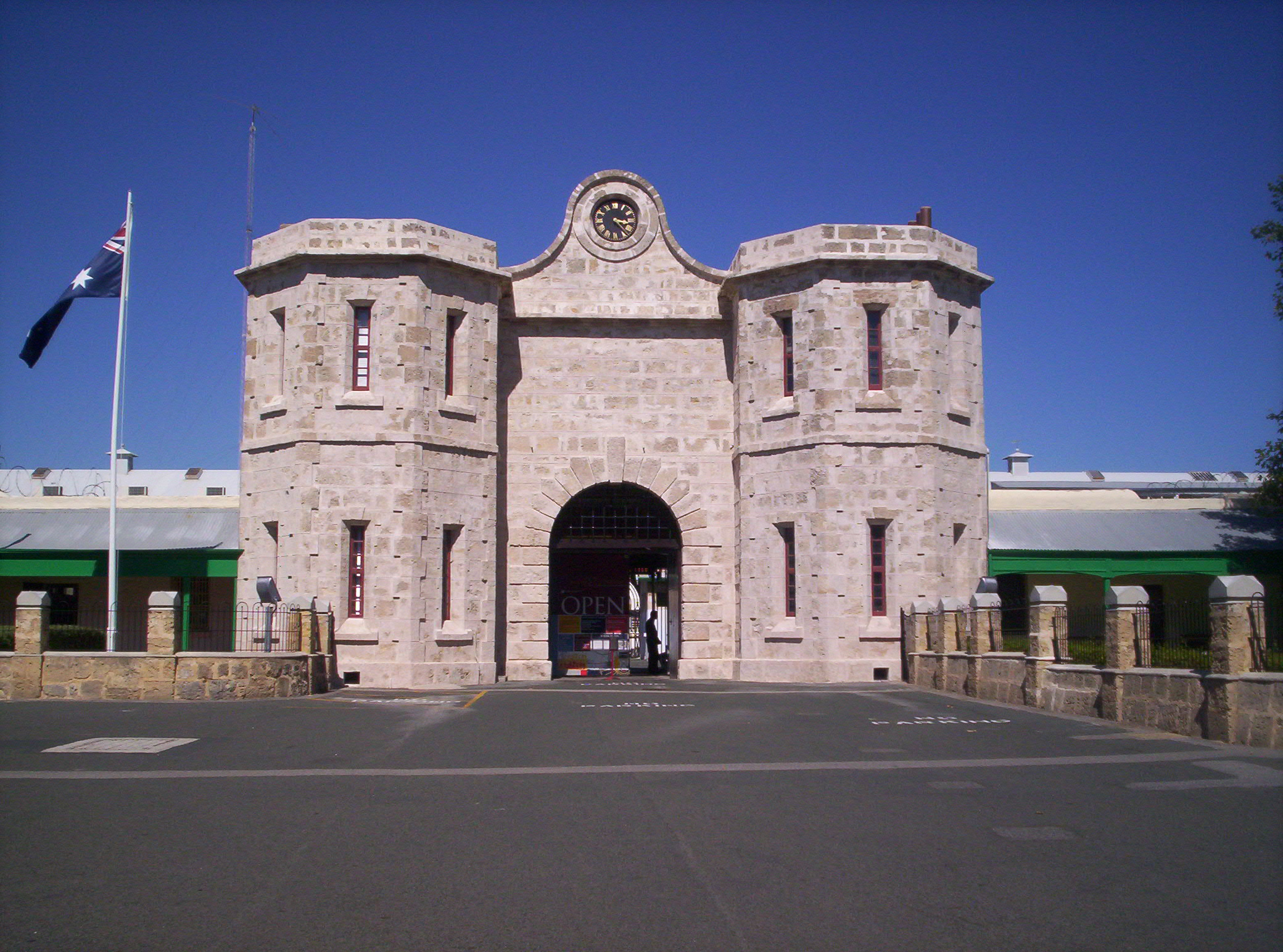
The prison gatehouse, restored in 2005

The prison is surrounded by limestone perimeter walls, which define the extent of the depot and its original topography to the south, east and north. The walls are of random rubble limestone and lime mortar and range in height from 1.2 to 5 metres (3 ft 11 in to 16 ft 5 in). The additional four courses added in 1898 are of dark stone with a coping. Attached piers occur at approximately 6-metre (20 ft) centres on the lee sides of the walls. There are a number of openings including both vehicular and pedestrian gates. The walls are of exceptional heritage significance being a vital part of the precinct defining its character. Sterile zones, inside the main perimeter walls and the walls encircling the female division and outside the prison wall, were standard prison practice for surveillance and contribute to the austere character of the prison.

The entry complex consists of a combined gate house and quarters, an entry court and military and civil guard houses with embrasures flanking the inner gate. The two storey limestone gatehouse, with a central clock, presents an imposing entry to the former prison. The gatehouse and associated entry complex was constructed between 1854 and 1855 using convict labour. It was designed by Royal Engineer Edmund Henderson, and constructed out of limestone. The gatehouse has two towers either side of a narrow gate, reminiscent of those found in 13th century English castles or walled cities. The gate was made from iron which had been scavenged from shipwrecks, while the clock at the top of the structure was imported from England. The clock was made in London in 1854, installed two years later, and as of 2004, was still sounding every hour.

The gatehouse also has a smaller, second, inner gate, engraved with the names of three significant figures: H. Wray RE, who designed the gate; J. Manning, clerk of works, who supervised its fabrication; and Joseph Nelson, the Royal Sappers soldier that wrought the iron. The complex was expanded and altered successively throughout the use of the entry complex for prison's functions. The entry complex was extended north to the female division as a workshop range, the western workshops, leaving a sterile zone beside the perimeter wall. The gatehouse has remained a significant feature and landmark since the closure of the prison, as the main entrance, and housing a café and office areas. Restoration was carried out in 2005, preserving the original stone facade and removing non-original rendering.

== Cell blocks ==
=== Main Cell Block ===
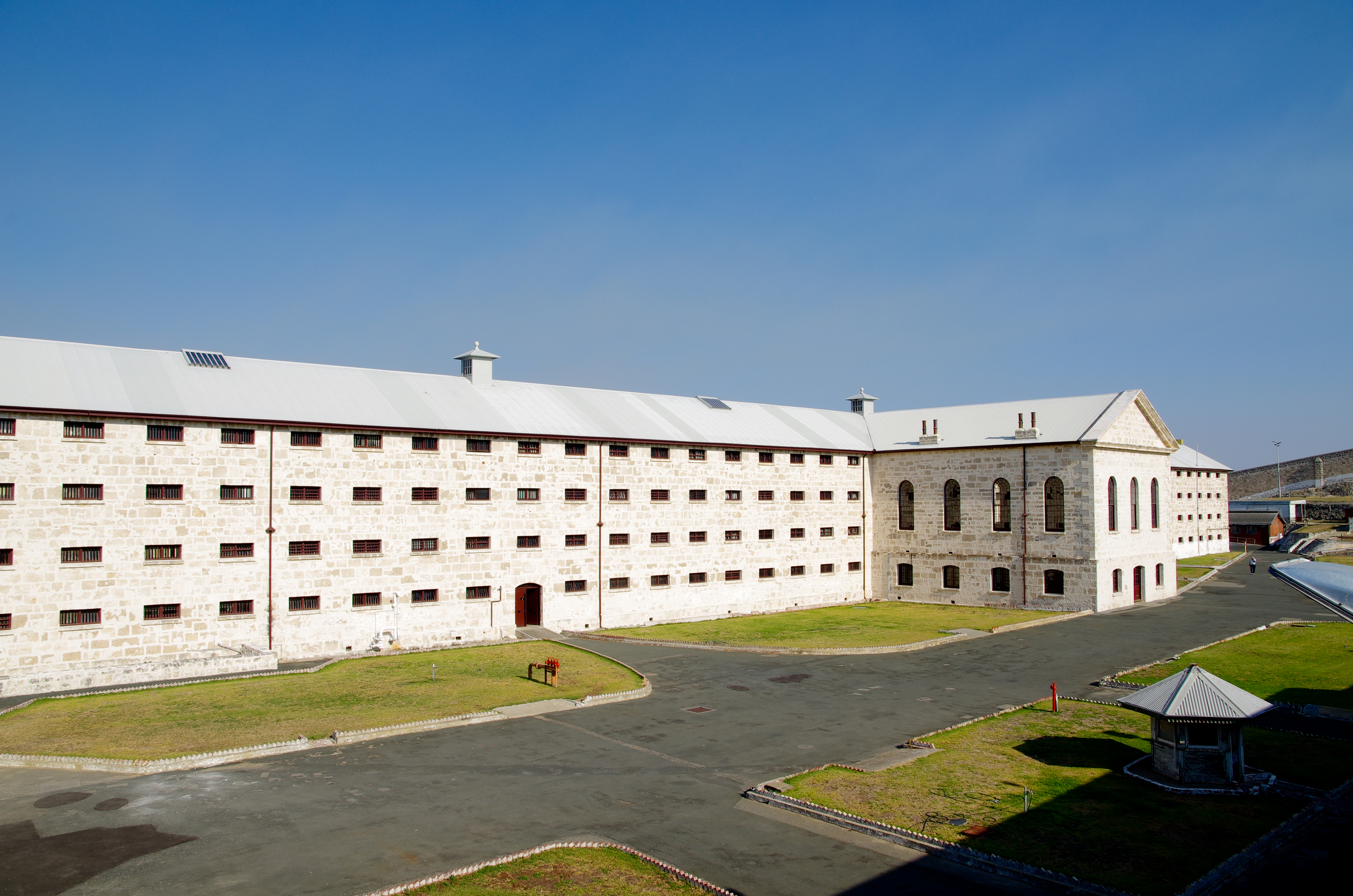
Main Cell Block exterior

Based on the English Pentonville Prison design model of Joshua Jebb, the site's key feature, the Main Cell Block, was designed by the Comptroller of Convicts Captain Henderson, and completed in 1859. Designed to hold up to 1000 prisoners, it is 145 metres (476 ft) long and four storeys high, the longest and tallest cell range in Australia. It was constructed by convicts in the 1850s, and there have been few changes since that time. The 1859 main cell block has an impressive facade and is built of limestone ashlar blocks quarried from the site. It is significant for the ways in which its scale, position in the precinct, simplicity, material and near pristine character ensures that it is the focal and dominating feature of the prison; the evidence of its fabric, internal configuration and spaces reveals its functioning as a convict depot and subsequent prison and its atmosphere. It has come to symbolise the imperial convict era in colonial Western Australia.

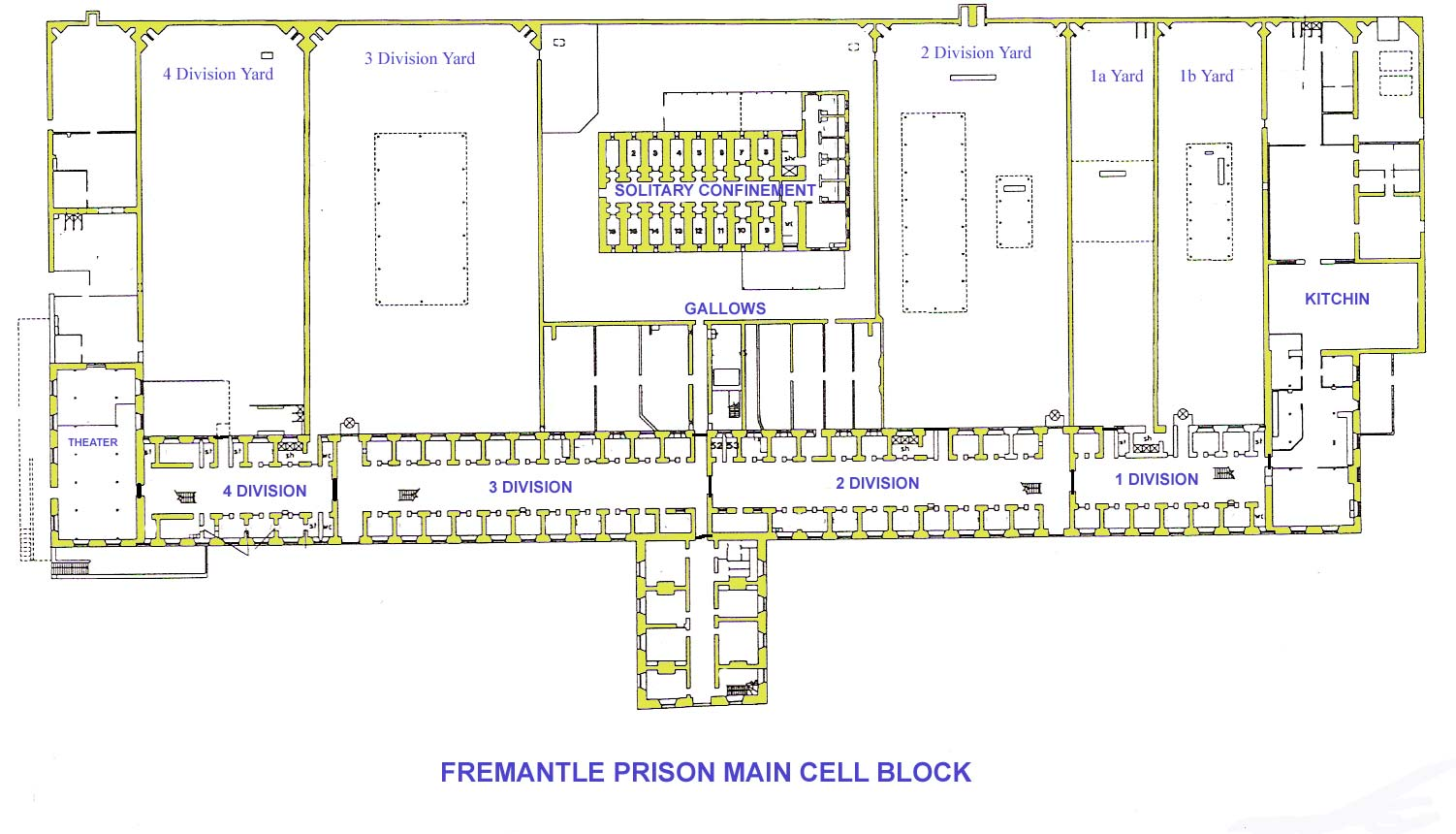
Main Cell Block internal arrangement

The central, four-storey high cell block is flanked on either end by large dormitory wards, called the Association Rooms. Here, as many as 80 men slept in hammocks, either as a reward for good behaviour or because they would soon receive their Ticket of Leave. In contrast, the cells were a confining space measuring just 2.1 by 1.2 metres (7 by 4 ft). While each cell initially had a basin connected to running water, the installation was before the advent of S-bends; the smells coming up the pipes lead to their removal by the 1860s. Following a Royal Commission, the cells were made larger by removing a dividing wall from between two cells. Electric lighting was installed in the 1920s, but there were never any toilets – buckets were used for the duration of the prison's operation. Since the prison's closure, six cells have been restored to represent the varying living conditions at different times in the prison's history. The main block also houses the gallows, solitary confinement cells, and two chapels.

The single storey 1855 refractory block is on the same axis as the main cell block to its east. It consists of twelve punishment cells and six dark cells with no light. The gallows chamber, built in 1888, is between this and the main cell block and relates to the colonial use of the prison. The gallows operated via a rope tied around a beam, over a trap door, on the upper level. Opening the trap door would cause the condemned prisoner fall, and thus be hanged.

At the centre of the Main Cell Block is the Anglican Chapel, whose windows were the only ones without bars. It occupies a prominent position in the projecting wing in the centre of the facade. It retains its original painted and stencilled wall patterns beneath later paint layers and is the most intact early prison chapel in Australia. Its interior features include an early and substantial example of a laminated arch construction in the colonies and the first in WA, handsome decalogue boards and some original and elegant joinery. Behind the Anglican chapel altar, there is a painted representation of the Ten Commandments. The words to the sixth commandment use the unusual translation of "thou shalt do no murder" rather than "thou shalt not kill," the more common interpretation in the Church of England. Given that the gallows were still in regular use, it was felt that "thou shalt not kill" would have been hypocritical. The Catholic Chapel was put into the upper northern Association Ward in 1861. The floor has evidence of its former use for communal prisoner accommodation, in the form of mortices for hammock rails and a convict painted mural which decorates its wall.

=== New Division ===
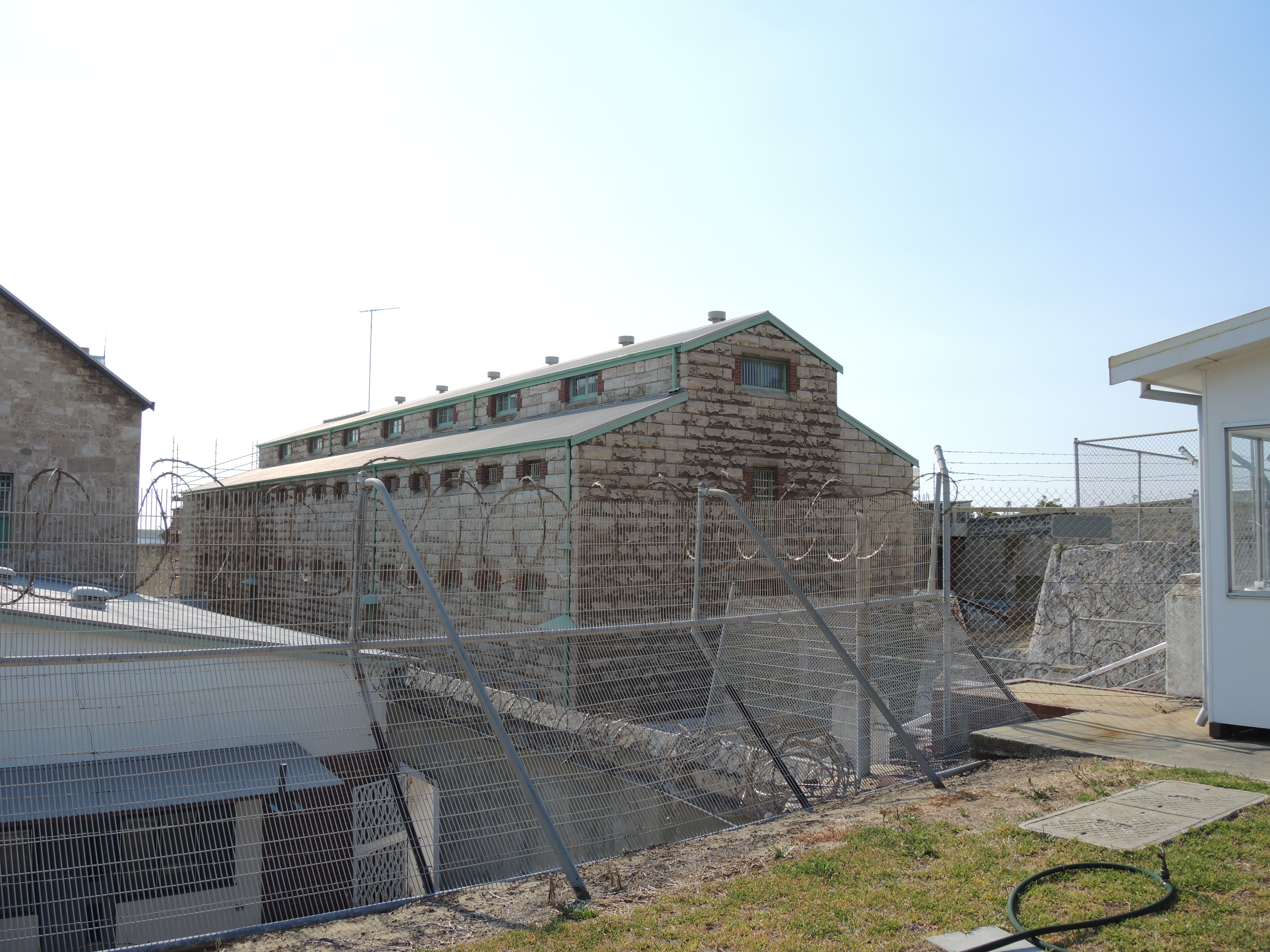
New Division, adjacent to the hospital (right) and Main Cell Block (left)

Fremantle Prison's New Division was constructed between 1904 and 1907, as a response to overcrowding. The division continues the façade alignment of the main block. The building, L shaped in plan, is three storeys high of regular coursed pale ashlar limestone blocks with rock-face. Openings are set in brick and freestone and it has a handsome lantern range above the main atrium. The building is visually significant as it complements the main cell block and completes the northern zone of the prison. The interior configuration and cells are significant as an example of an attempt to introduce the separate system to Western Australia, whereby prisoners were completely isolated for the first three months of their sentence. The division's exercise yard initially used a panopticon to facilitate this concept during the prisoners' hour of exercise each day. The system was not successful, and considered a dated prisoner management strategy, leading its removal within five years.

The New Division was the first to have electricity, with underground wiring. During World War Two, the Australian Army appropriated the New Division, to keep prisoners separate from the main population, and for those condemned to death. In 1994 the building was retrofitted to cater for offices, small business premises, and meeting rooms.

=== Women's Prison ===
The north-western complex was originally a service area with a cookhouse, bakehouse and laundry, built in the 1850s. A place for women prisoners was needed following the closure of Perth Gaol and the transfer of prisoners to Fremantle. The buildings were converted to a prison, and a wall built around them, creating Western Australia's first separate prison for women – a jail within a jail. Population and crime growth led to them being extended in the 1890s and 1910s. The single storey limestone building, also known as the female division, has a distinctive monitor roof and an upper storey addition to part of the eastern range in red brick. The construction of Bandyup Women's Prison saw Fremantle's Women's Prison close in 1970. The space was used for education and assessment until the main prison's closure in 1991, and has since been adapted for TAFE use as a visual arts facility.

== Staff accommodation ==
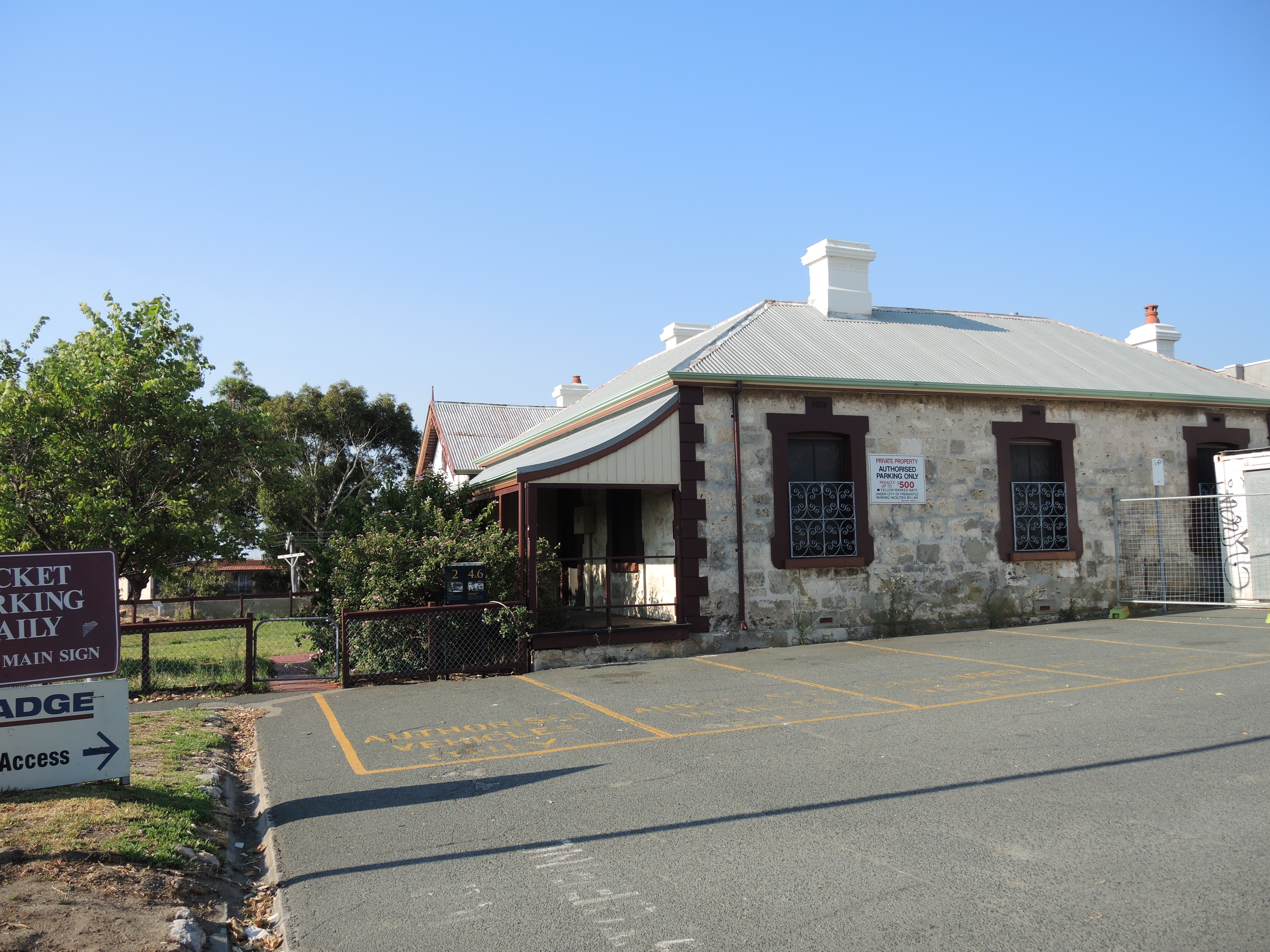
2, 4, and 6 The Terrace, at the north end of the street

A flat area, to the immediate west of the prison, is called The Terrace and was formed from rubble resulting from the levelling of the prison site. Adjoining the western perimeter wall, but outside the prison on the northern side of the terrace compound, is staff accommodation. Three adjoining residences were built in the 1890s as quarters for prison staff.

The cottages at 2, 4, and 6 The Terrace, at the northern end of the street, were built in a Victorian style, in contrast to the Georgian style of the other houses. Number 2 incorporates parts of an 1857 guard room and was converted in the 1890s to quarters, when Numbers 4 and 6 were built alongside as a duplex. Number 2 is a single storey house with random rubble limestone walls and corrugated iron roof separated from the perimeter wall by a rear yard. Numbers 4 and 6 are a pair of single duplex units with random rubble limestone walls, corrugated iron roofs and front verandahs, separated from the perimeter wall by a rear yard.

Four two storey residences, Numbers 8, 10, 16 and 18 The Terrace, were built during the 1850s for officer accommodation. Number 8, also known as the Chaplain's House, is a two-storey house with rendered and painted limestone walls. The plan is roughly square with verandahs and balconies along the west and south sides. A single storey building connects the south-east side of the house to the main prison wall.

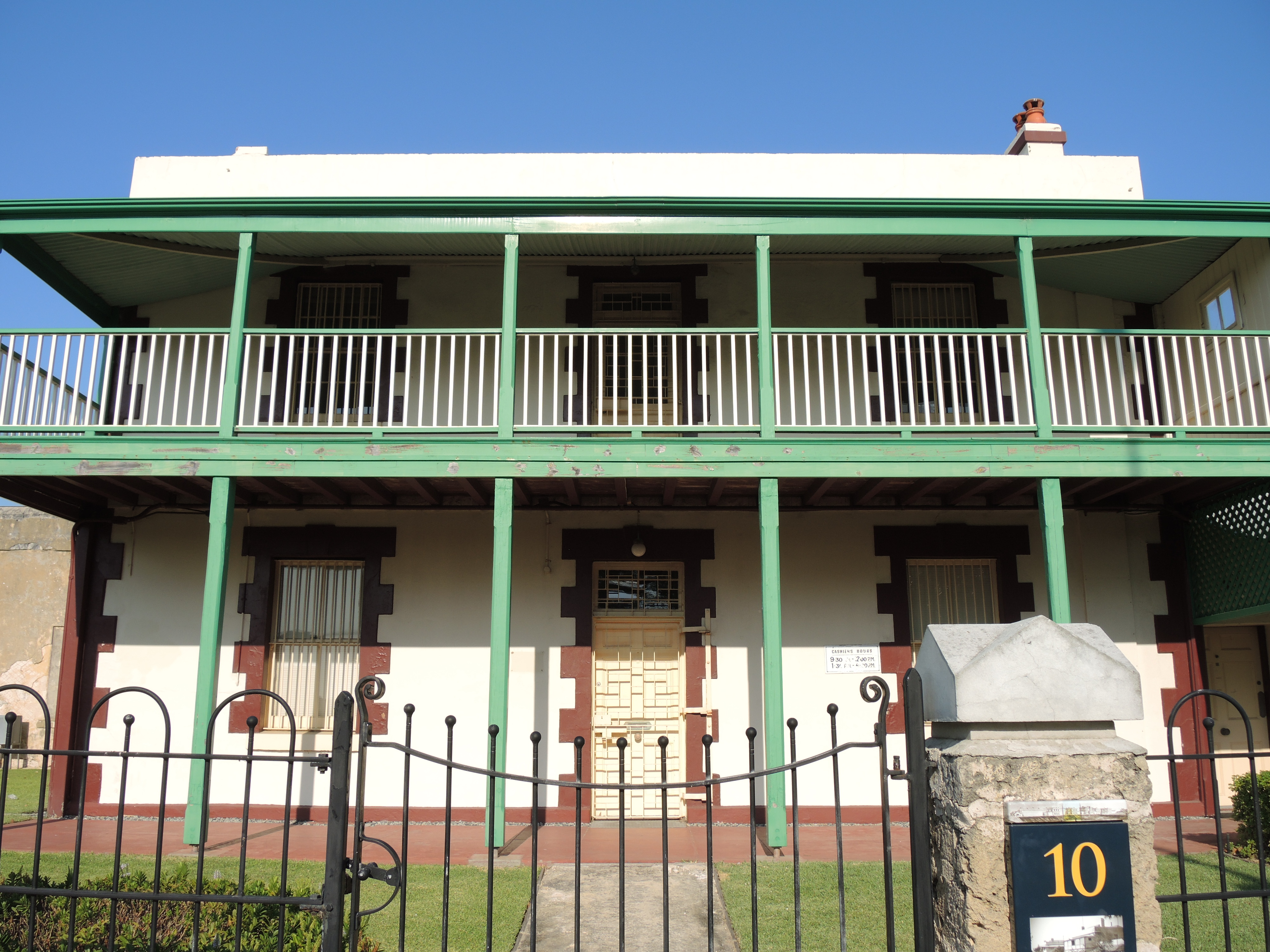
10 The Terrace, also known as the Superintendent's House

Number 10, also known as the Superintendent's House, is a two-storey house with rendered limestone walls and a corrugated iron roof behind parapet walls. It is connected to the gatehouse with limestone walled buildings. The plan is roughly square and there is a door from the house into the prison from the north-east room of the ground floor. The house was initially built in 1853 for the Chaplain, but was taken over by the superintendent in 1878 and was later used by the prison administration.

Number 16 is a house is two-storey building, roughly square in plan, with painted limestone walls and a corrugated sheet metal roof behind a parapet. It accommodated first the superintendent, later on the resident magistrate, and remained in-use as housing for prison officers until the 1970s. Number 18, also known as the Surgeon's House, is a two-storey structure with limestone walls. It is the southernmost house on The Terrace. Numbers 18 and 8, the northernmost of the initial buildings, both featured two sitting rooms, three bedrooms, and two dressing rooms, as well as a kitchen, water closet and shed, but with mirrored layouts. Number 18 was expanded with additions built in the 1890s. A single storey limestone structure (former stables) is located to the south of Number 18.

== Other buildings ==
=== Hospital ===
The hospital, built between 1857 and 1859, was a crucial component of Fremantle Prison. Public works during the convict era relied on convict labour, which could only be provided if the convicts were healthy. Located in the north-eastern corner of the prison compound, the building is H-shaped in plan, single storey with rendered and painted limestone walls. It features a wide verandah with timber posts. From 1886 to 1903, medical services were relocated to the main cell block, with the former building used to keep invalids and female prisoners. The hospital was refurbished, and reopened in 1904. It subsequently remained in continuous operation until the prison's closure in 1991.

Adjacent to the hospital building is the east reservoir. The brick vaulted reservoir and reticulation system, constructed in 1890 and about 1895, appear as a low brick structure. The reservoir roof consists of five rendered vaults each side of a central vault raised 600 millimetres (24 in) above those each side. The centre of the eastern terrace contains the subsurface remains of the 1850s bathhouse and well.

=== Workshops ===
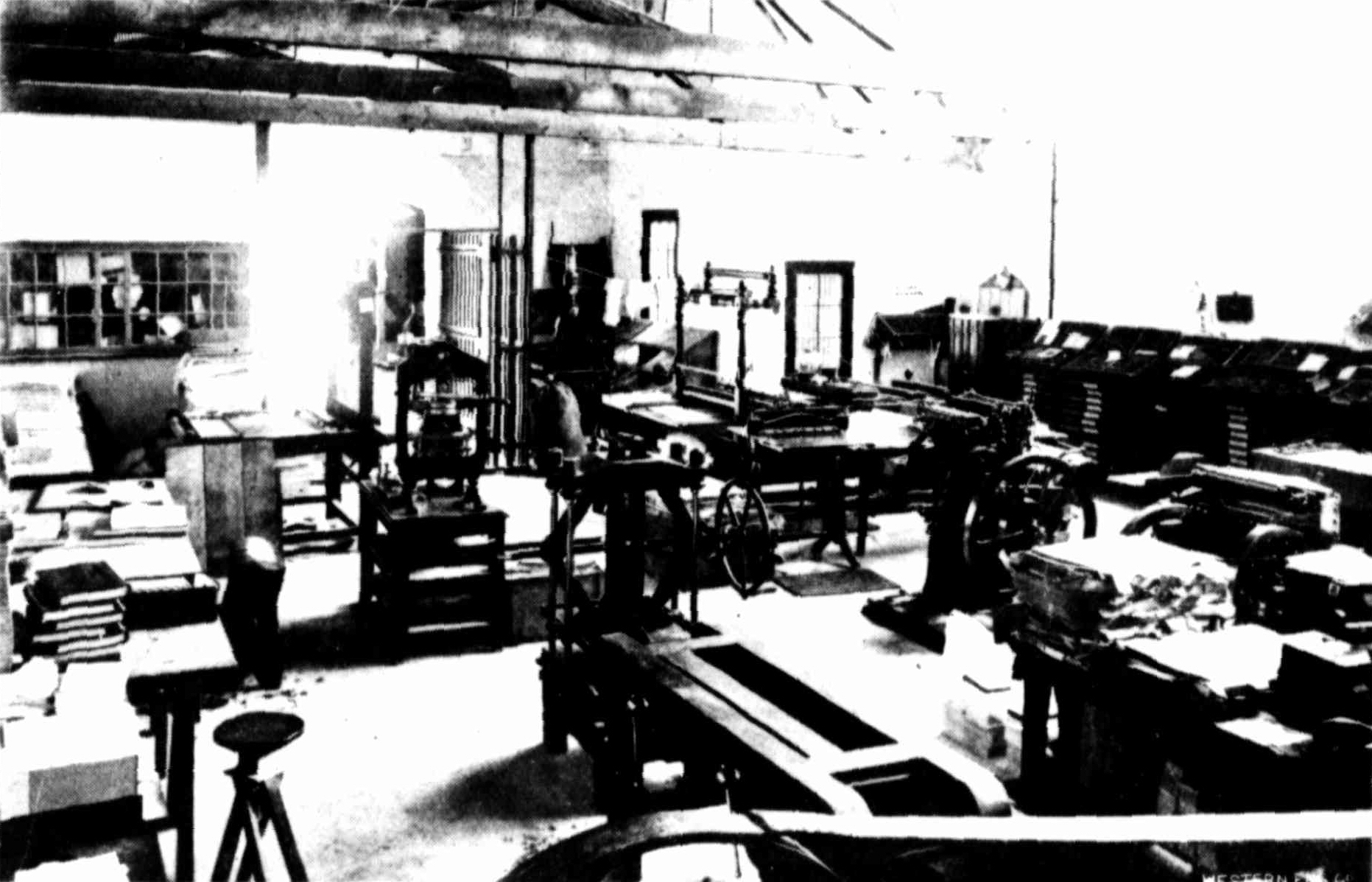
The prison printery in 1909

The prison's workshops provided activities and training for the prisoners. They also reduced the cost of maintenance, repairs, and construction by providing an in-house service. The original workshop was a blacksmith's shop, one of the first buildings to be constructed on the prison site. Later known as the East Workshops, other workshops included carpenter's, plumber's and painter's, a printing office, and from the 1850s, a metal shop. The West Workshops were built at the start of the twentieth century, providing more work for prisoners through a paint shop, mat maker, shoe maker, book binder and tailor shop. The five western workshops are a single storey squared limestone rubble building with openings dressed in brick, with an open saw-tooth roof with southern skylights, concealed behind a parapet wall. In 1993 the western workshops were adapted for use as TAFE art workshops.

Buildings in the area south of the east workshops were used for a shower block, helmet workshop and associated sheds. The structures are recent and, with the exception of some terrace walling, are the last of a series that have been erected and dismantled since World War I.

== Tunnels ==
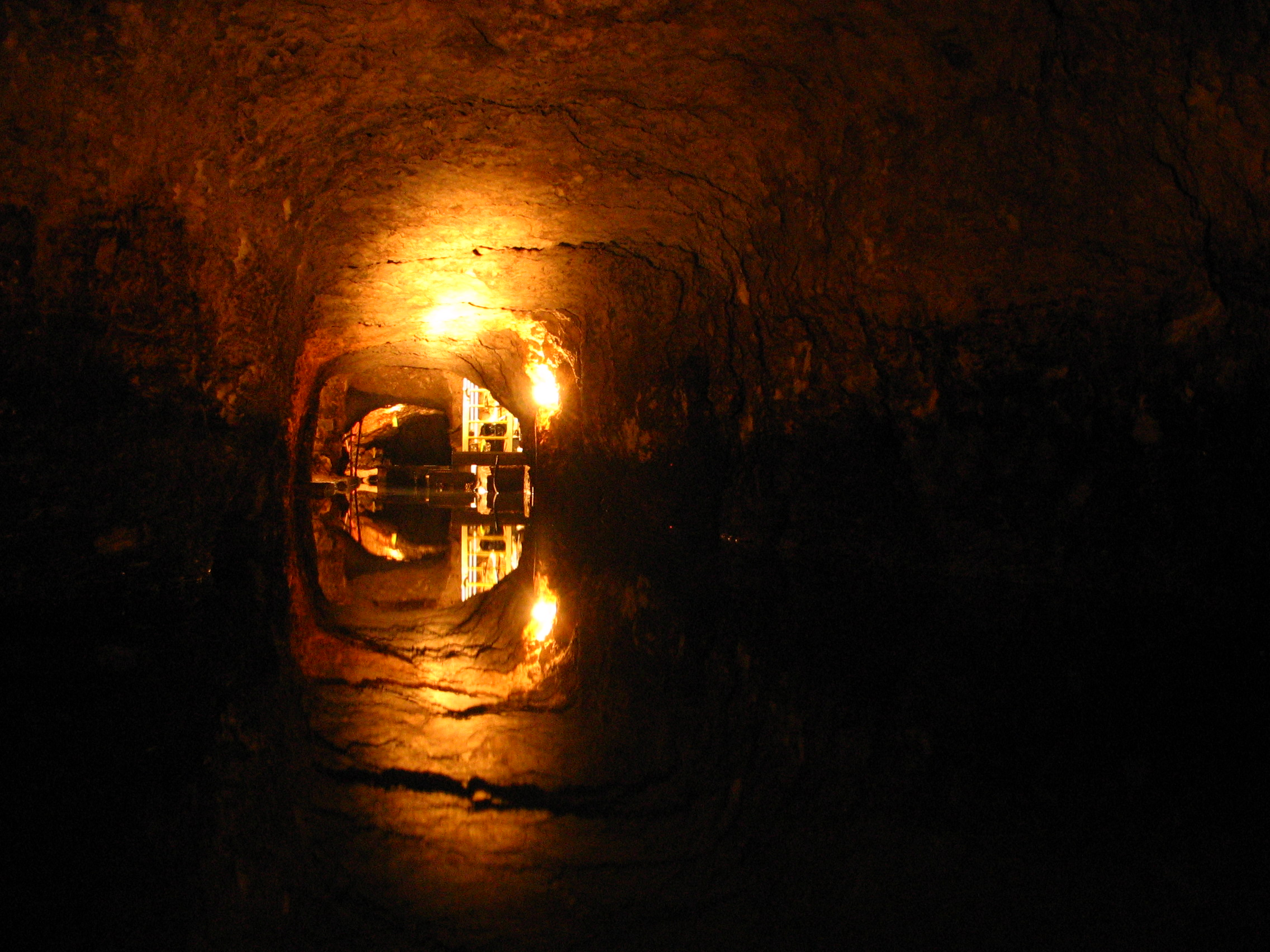
View inside the tunnels

At the south eastern corner of the eastern terrace is the former pumping station, associated tunnels and a set of 1850s workshops within an enclosing wall. Underneath parts of the eastern terrace, the adjacent Hampton Road, the pumping station and the workshops there are a complex series of shafts, drives and weirs cut from the rock during the 1890s and early twentieth century. The east workshops is a single storey limestone building on the western side with an enclosed area to the east. The entire workshops yard was roofed using a light steel truss on steel supports in 1960.

A tunnel network exists under the prison, including a one-kilometre (0.6 mi) connection to South Beach in South Fremantle. It was built by prisoners, but the purpose was not to enable escapes; their labour was used to provide the prison, and later the town of Fremantle, with a supply of fresh water. Guards in a gun tower adjacent to the tunnel entrance prevented any attempted escapes.

In 1852, during construction of the buildings, shafts were sunk into the limestone bedrock to provide the prison with fresh water from an aquifer. In 1874, the Fremantle's "Water House Well", used to supply ships, suffered storm damage. This prompted a tank to be installed at the prison, behind the main cell block, to offer the town an alternative water supply. Prisoners worked a pump to fill the tank, which was connected to the jetties through gravity-fed pipes.

Increasing demand led to the construction of a reservoir in 1876, from which water was drawn, still pumped by prisoners. From 1888 to 1894, additional wells were built, connected by a series of tunnels or horizontal drives (Note: This provided a greater surface area allowing more water to be drawn) 20 metres (66 ft) under the north-east of the prison. A steam pump was implemented, which drew 68,000 litres (15,000 imperial gallons) per hour of water into the new East Reservoir. In 1896, a town reservoir was constructed on Swanbourne Street, fed from the prison by a triple expansion steam-driven pump which could take more than 4.5 million litres (1 million imperial gallons) per day from the prison tunnels. Prisoners, relieved of manual pumping, were employed to supply wood and stoke boilers.

The Metropolitan Sewerage & Water Supply authority took over control of the pumping station from 1901 until 1910, when both the prison and town were connected to Perth's metropolitan water supply. The tunnels were closed in 1910, but the groundwater continued to be used for the prison's gardens. In 1989, oil leaking from nearby tanks contaminated the water. The pollution was eventually cleared by 1996 through bioremediation.

Since the prison's closure the water supply system including the tunnels, were the subject of heritage studies, including a 2004 inspection by the WA Maritime Museum. The tunnels were re-opened in mid-2005, and within one year the main shaft had been refurbished, including "installation of audio-visual equipment, railings and lighting as well as the removal of debris from the access shaft and tunnels, the creation of new steel platforms and ladders and the addition of extra limestone rocks in the tunnels to help lift users out of the water."

== Open spaces and related elements ==
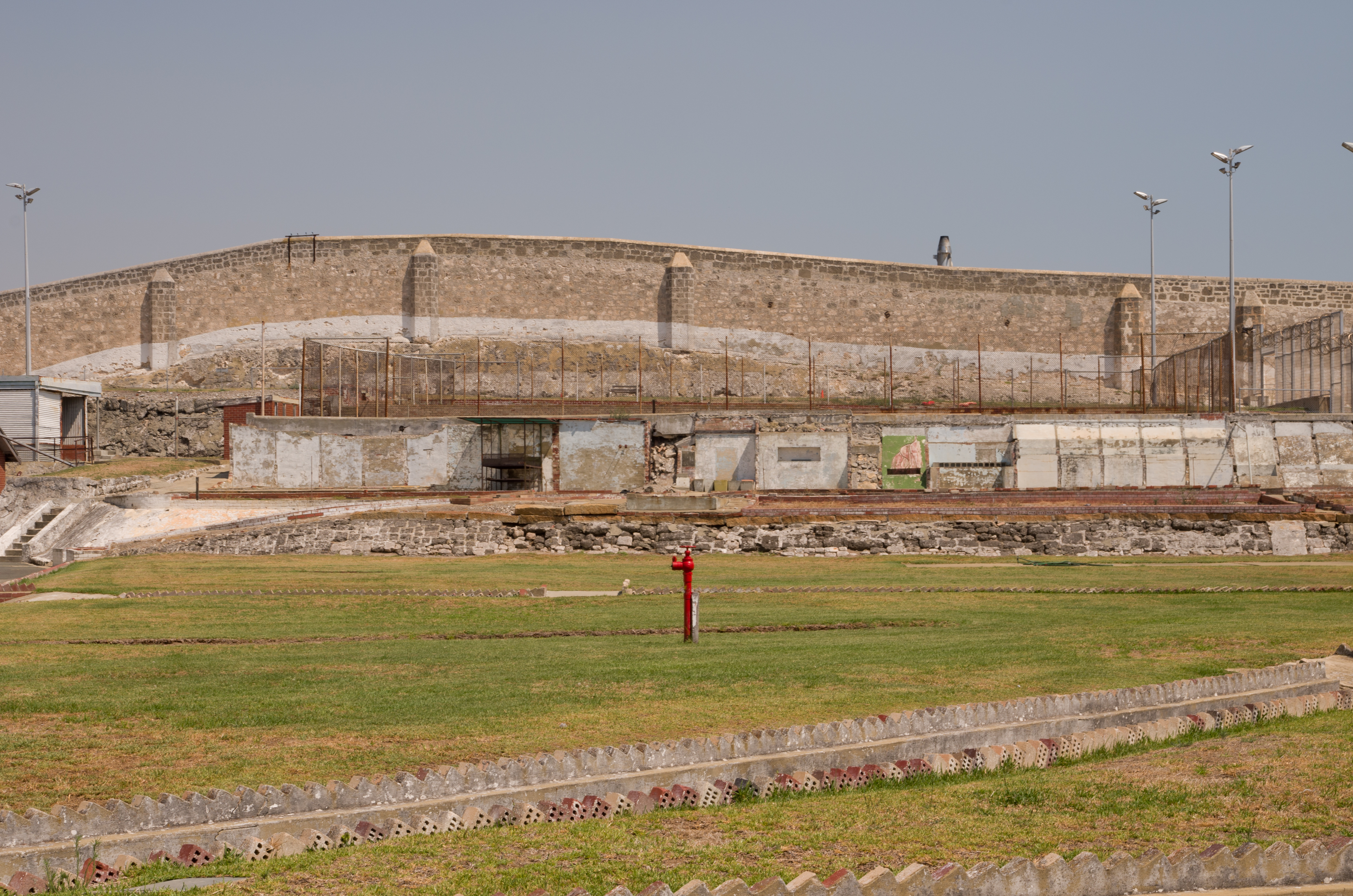
View across to South Knoll

The open spaces of the precinct are significant as they provide impressive settings for the structures. They are also important spaces in their own right retaining the stark open character of a penal institution required for surveillance. The extensive forecourt of the main cell block, with its scale and secure location within the perimeter walls, is particularly impressive. Paths are bitumen with grassed garden beds delineated by raised brick edging. South Knoll comprises the remains of the high, natural ground level which at least by 1896 had been terraced to form flat, grassed areas. The former playing fields and tennis courts are still in evidence. There is a brick-vaulted reservoir located under the Knoll. The significant landscape presents an austere and formal quality within the perimeter walls. Generally the landscape is sparse and simple, comprising unobtrusive elements such as lawn, low plantings and pavement. Landscape elements outside the walls include the exotic almond and pine trees on the Terrace.

An inclined tramway, the ramp, was built from the front of the terrace, on the axis of the gatehouse, down towards the port area of Fremantle. The ramp, constructed between 1852 and 1853, is of limestone rubble from the cut and fill activities required to create the prison site and the terrace. The ramp is an integral part of the original design of the prison complex and is of exceptional heritage significance. It is now cut at its western end by a modern road which severs the historic visual link with Fremantle. On each side of the alignment of the ramp, where it intersects with Henderson Street, are three terrace houses for the accommodation of prison warders. These were erected between 1851 and 1858 and mark the boundary of the Convict Establishment at this point. The limestone used for the early prison and its associated housing was quarried on the site.

Other surviving elements of the early convict establishment include Henderson's house, "The Knowle", the three Henderson Street cottages (terrace housing) at numbers 7–17, 19–29, and 31–41 Henderson Street, a range of terraces at 3–9 Holdsworth Street, paths, roads and ramps, garden sites, walls, sub surface works and the more distant routes to the Asylum, the Commissariat Store and wharf site.

== See also ==
- List of executions at Fremantle Prison
- History of Fremantle Prison
- Riots at Fremantle Prison
- Staff and prisoners of Fremantle Prison
