= Civil disturbances in Western Australia =

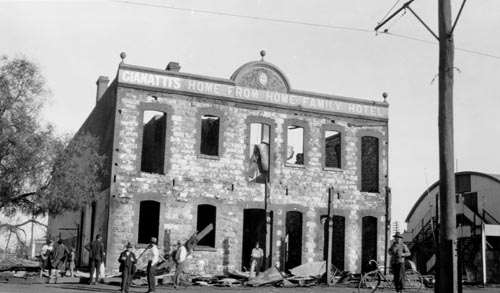
Kalgoorlie after the 1934 race riots

Civil disturbances in Western Australia include race riots, prison riots, and religious conflicts – often Protestant versus Catholic groups. The earliest civil disturbances were actions by the local Aboriginal population dealing with European settlers.

Demonstrations and protests are linked to a range of issues over time. In the convict era, there were collective actions by convicts. Organised labour had to deal with issues on the Goldfields in the 1890s and 1900s with demonstrations and protest actions, while in Perth these occurred in the 1960s and 1970s over war and race issues.

There are some incidents in the 19th century where the causes are less clear. A restricted press and limited means of some groups to gain avenues to express their grievances in a dominated society, means that some disturbances were suppressed literally and disguised in the public record. In some cases some smaller disturbances (alcohol-related fights) in the Goldfields (Kalgoorlie, Boulder and Coolgardie for instance) would not be considered full-scale riots, but nonetheless the charges found either in newspaper or police records would suggest a significance beyond a simple incidence of drunken behaviour.

== Incidents ==
Many of these events and incidents are difficult to find from direct references, and require diligent examination of sources. Some are unlikely to show up in newspaper reports at all. In some cases incidents need checking and more accurate dating.

- 1834 - Race riots against Lascars (Portuguese creole stokers) - Perth
- 1853 - Convicts on Phoebe Dunbar - "a disturbance of a rather serious nature" while at anchor.
- 1854 - Convicts riot over religious issue - Fremantle Prison. Prisoners revolted when mass was cancelled due to the suspension of the Roman Catholic Chaplain for calling the Protestant Chaplain "an Agent of the Devil" during a sermon. Five prisoners received 100 lashes each as an example.

- see also Riots at Fremantle Prison between this date and 1988

- 1894 - Riot at Mallina - Pilbara Goldfield - over Goldfield Warden Decision -
- 1897 - Riot after Catholics attacked Protestants during 12th July parade - Coolgardie
- 1898 - Riot in September on leases - Kalgoorlie
- 1899 - Riot on Wharf during Lumper Strike - Fremantle
- 1899 - Riot in September on leases over alluvial regulations made by '10 ft Ned' Wittenoom - Kalgoorlie
- 1901 - Conflict between Catholics and Protestants - Kalgoorlie
- 1901 - Anti-Protestant conflict on 12 July - Boulder 12th July parade
- 1905 - Race riots - between Chinese, Japanese, Malay - Broome
- 1905-10? - Race riots Anti-Italian riots - Gwalia and Leonora
- 1910 - Tramway Strike riots - Perth and East Perth
- 1914 - Race riots - between Japanese, Malay - Broome
- 1915 - Race riots - anti-German riot - Fremantle
- 1916 - Anti-Greek riots - Perth (October), Kalgoorlie (December)
- 1917 - Anti-Conscription riot - Cue
- 1919 Fremantle Wharf riot
- 1919 - Race riots - anti-Slav riot - Fremantle
- 1919 - Inter union violence Kalgoorlie/Boulder
- 1919 - Protests against increase in price of beer - Kalgoorlie
- 1920 - Broome race riots of 1920 - Japanese vs Malay and returned servicemen - Broome
- 1922 - Demonstrations against Mitchell government
- 1923 (1925?) - Hotel Workers Strike - Perth
- 1924/6 - Seamen's Strike - Fremantle
- 1929 - Mutiny at Fremantle Prison over shaving - Fremantle
- 1931 - 'Treasury Building' incident - Perth
- 1934 - Anti-Italian/Slav riot - Kalgoorlie
- 1940/45 - American/Australian Servicemen incidents - various locations
- 1944 - 11 April "Huge riot" in Fremantle High Street involving 500-600 people
- 1946 - Pilbara Pastoral Strike meetings in Perth - broken up
- 1947–55 - 'Cold War Violence' - incidents between CPA, and opponents and police - various locations
- 1956+ - Dock strike scuffles and incidents - Fremantle
- 1967+ - Demonstration Anti Vietnam war events until the 1970s - various locations
- 1971 - Demonstration Anti Apartheid/Springbok Tour incidents - various locations
- 1974+ - Demonstration "54b of Police Act" incidents - various locations
- 1988 - Fremantle prison riot and Fire - Fremantle
- 2016 - Aboriginal protest - Kalgoorlie

== See also ==
- Race riot
- Racial violence in Australia
