= List of executions at Fremantle Prison =

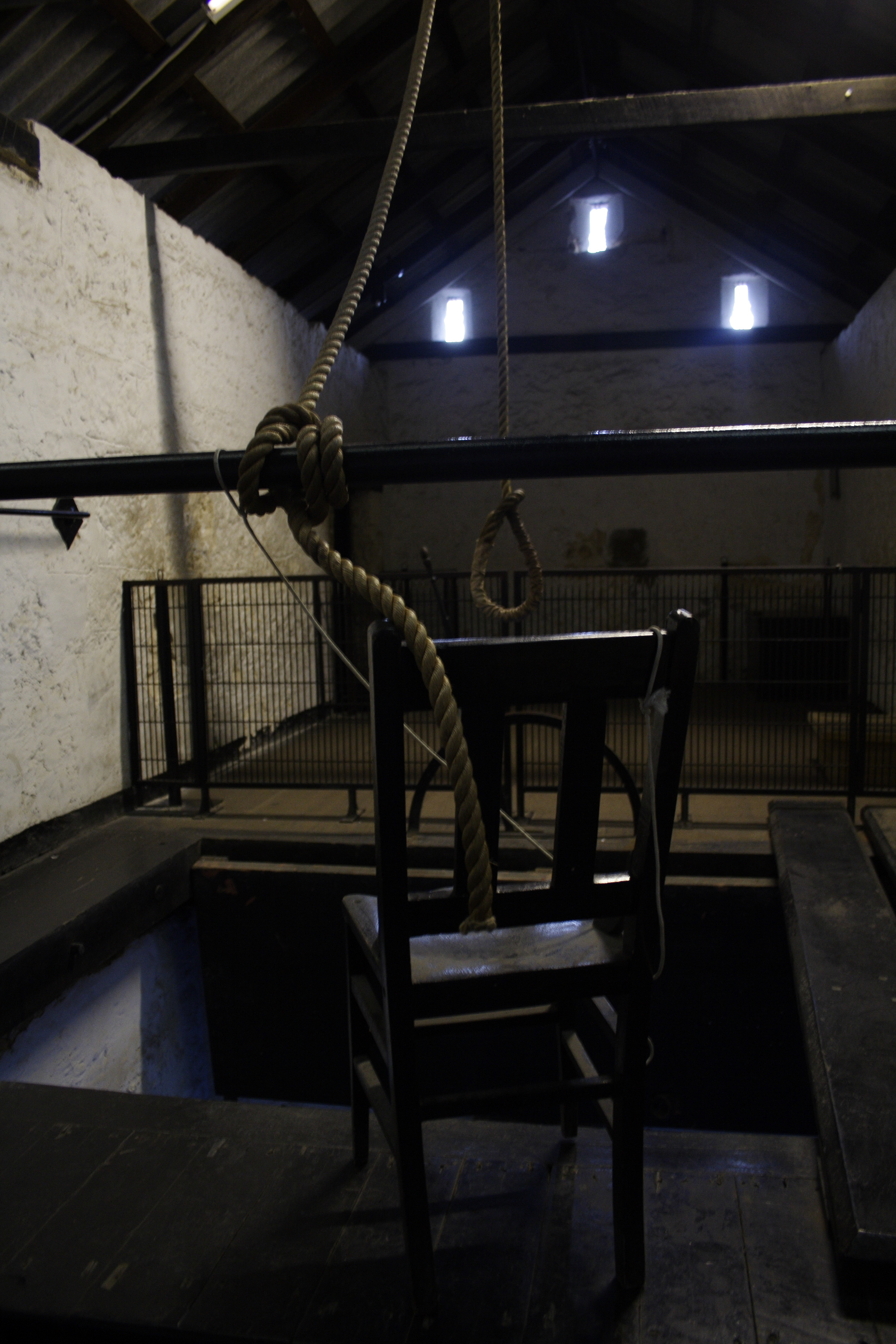
The gallows, last used in 1964

Executions at Fremantle Prison in Fremantle, Western Australia, were carried out between 1889 and 1964. Other places of execution in Western Australia included the Roundhouse at Fremantle; the old and new Perth Gaols; on Rottnest Island; at the sites of the capital offence, such as at Maddington and Norrilong, York; on the eastern end of The Causeway at Victoria Park; at Redcliffe; at Roebourne in the Pilbara; at Derby and Mount Dockerell (near Halls Creek) in the Kimberley; and at Albany and Geraldton. All executions were by hanging except that of Midgegooroo, carried out by firing squad at the old Perth Gaol in 1833.

Forty-three men and one woman were hanged at Fremantle Prison. Condemned prisoners were vigilantly observed to prevent suicide attempts. On the day of execution, they were hanged by falling through an opening trap door with a noose around their neck, in front of witnesses. In the 19th century, the media gave comprehensive accounts of the executions, but in later years they became private matters, concealed within the prison walls. Capital punishment was abolished in Western Australia in 1984.

Included on the list below are all the executions carried out at Fremantle Prison.

== History ==
Western Australia's first legal execution of a British colonist occurred in 1844, outside the Roundhouse at Fremantle. Fifteen-year-old John Gavin had been found guilty of the murder of George Pollard at South Dandalup, despite the circumstantial evidence and an absence of motive.

As soon as Fremantle Prison came under local control in 1886, a refractory block with gallows was planned. It was completed in 1888, and first used in 1889 to execute convicted murderer Jimmy Long, a Malay. The gallows room remained a legal place of execution until 1984. 43 men and one woman were hanged in this period. Martha Rendell was the only woman to be hanged at the prison, in 1909. The last person to be hanged was serial killer Eric Edgar Cooke, executed in 1964.

From the day of sentencing to death, prisoners were kept in a concrete-floored cell in New Division. They were vigilantly observed to prevent them escaping their sentence through suicide. With hangings taking place on Monday mornings, at 8:00 am, condemned prisoners were woken three hours earlier, and provided with a last meal, shower, and clean clothes. Afterwards, handcuffed, they were moved to a holding or "condemned cell" nearby the gallows, and allowed a couple of sips of brandy to calm their nerves.

Shortly before 8:00 am, they were hooded, and led up to the execution chamber, which could hold as many as eleven witnesses. They were made to stand over the trap door, had a noose put around their neck, and were hanged by falling through the opening trap door. After medical examination, the deceased was removed for burial. Witnesses could become distressed during executions, and even officers sometimes fainted. It was also difficult to find someone, usually independent of the prison, to employ as the executioner – they were often recruited from the eastern states in the 20th century.

In the 19th century, the media gave comprehensive accounts of the executions. Harry Pres's final moments on 8 November 1889 were described by The West Australian as:

At a sign from the sheriff, the executioner pulled back the lever, and with a sickening thud the man disappeared from view. The deceased was a small made man, and consequently a drop of about ten feet [3.0 m] was given him, and on looking below it was seen that death had been almost instantaneous, scarcely a movement being perceptible in the swaying figure, which in a few minutes became rigid and motionless as the rope ceased swaying to and fro.

— The West Australian, 9 November 1899

Initially seen as a way to intimidate the population through the application of the law, executions carried out at Fremantle Prison became private matters, concealed within its walls. Capital punishment was abolished in Western Australia in 1984, and by the 21st century few Australians yearned for it. Author and journalist Cyril Ayris wrote that:

One often hears it said of criminals: "hanging is too good for them" yet many who favour capital punishment would change their minds if they visited the execution chamber and familiarised themselves with the ritual of capital punishment. It is a macabre business, which in the author's view at least, can never be condoned

— Cyril Ayris, 2003 [first published 1995]

== List ==
Executions at Fremantle Prison
Prisoner	Execution date
Jimmy Long	2 March 1889
Harry Pres aka Arle Pres	8 November 1889
Li Ki Hong aka Ah Chi	16 April 1891
Sin Cho Chi	29 April 1892
Chew Fong	29 April 1892
Yong Quong aka Young Quong	29 April 1892
Lyn Nye aka Lyee Nyee	29 April 1892
Mahomet Goulam	2 May 1896
Jumma Kahn	31 March 1897
Peter Perez	19 July 1900
Pedro De La Cruz	19 July 1900
Samuel Peters	9 September 1902
Stelios Psichitsas	15 April 1903
Fred Maillat aka Fredrick Mailliat	21 April 1903
Sabro Rokka aka Sebaro Rocca (Rokka)	7 July 1903
Ah Hook	11 January 1904
Mahomet Mianoor aka Mohomet Mianoor	4 May 1904
Charles Hagan	14 December 1905
Simeon Espada	14 December 1905
Pablo Marquez	14 December 1905
Antonio Sala	19 November 1906
Augustin De Kitchilan	23 October 1907
Harry Smith	23 March 1908
Iwakichi Oki	22 October 1908
Martha Rendell	6 October 1909
Peter Robustelli	9 February 1910
Alexander Smart	7 March 1911
David Smithson	25 July 1911
Charles Spargo	1 July 1913
Charles Odgers	14 January 1914
Andrea Sacheri	12 April 1915
Frank Matamin alias Rosland	12 March 1923
Royston Rennie	2 August 1926
William Coulter	25 October 1926
Phillip Treffene aka Phillip Trefene	25 October 1926
John Milner	21 May 1928
Clifford Hulme	3 September 1928
Antonio Fanto	18 May 1931
John Thomas Smith (Snowy Rowles)	13 June 1932
Karol Tapei aka Karol Tapci	23 June 1952
Robert Thomas	18 June 1960
Mervyn Fallows	6 June 1961
Brian William Robinson	20 January 1964
Eric Edgar Cooke	26 October 1964

== See also ==
- Capital punishment in Australia
- List of people legally executed in Western Australia
- Architecture of Fremantle Prison
- History of Fremantle Prison
- Riots at Fremantle Prison
- Staff and prisoners of Fremantle Prison
