= Staff and prisoners of Fremantle Prison =

Staff and prisoners of Fremantle Prison occupied the former prison on The Terrace, Fremantle, in Western Australia, between 1855 and 1991. Fremantle Prison was administered by a comptroller general, sheriff, or director, responsible for the entire convict or prison system, and a superintendent in charge of the prison itself. Prison officers, known as warders in the 19th century, guarded against escapes, enforced discipline, oversaw prisoner work, and instructed inmates in trades. Officers worked under stringent conditions until they achieved representation through the Western Australian Prison Officers Union. Convicts were initially of good character, as potential future colonists, but eventually less desirable convicts were sent, until the end of transportation in 1868. As a locally run prison, Fremantle's population was generally short-sentenced white prisoners in the 1890s, with very few Aboriginal prisoners; however, by the late 20th century, most prisoners were serving longer sentences, a higher proportion of them were violent, and Aboriginal people were over-represented.

== Administration ==
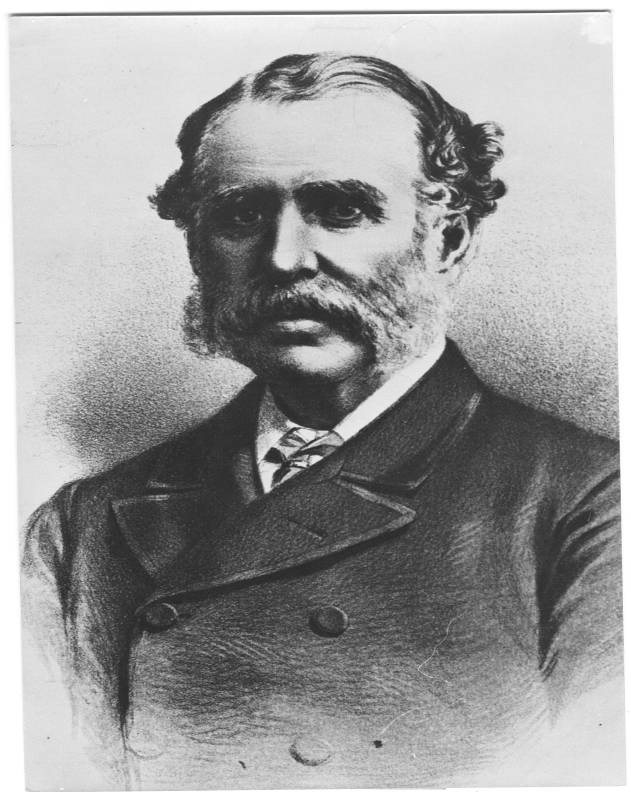
Comptroller General Edmund Henderson

Western Australia's first comptroller general of convicts, Edmund Henderson, arrived in the colony with the first convicts on board Scindian in June 1850. Henderson administered Western Australia's convict establishment for thirteen years; Battye writes that "its success was no doubt due to his wisdom and tact." The primary responsibilities of the comptroller general were to "direct convict labour and be responsible for convict discipline". After Henderson's resignation in 1863, William Newland was appointed his successor. Newland's arrival closely followed the appointment of Governor John Hampton, who had previously been comptroller general of convicts in Van Diemen's Land. Hampton assumed far more direct control of Western Australia's convict establishment than his predecessors, and was in perpetual disagreement with Newland. As a direct consequence, Newland retired early in 1866, and was recalled to Britain at the expense of the Imperial Government.

While awaiting a successor to the position, Governor Hampton appointed his son, George Hampton, to act in the position. George Hampton had no particular qualifications for the position, and already held a number of salaried posts. This "unusually blatant act of nepotism" was extremely unpopular within the colony, both Hamptons thereafter being figures of public hostility and ridicule. Under George Hampton, convict discipline became extremely strict, and escape attempts increased markedly. Henry Wakeford was appointed comptroller general of convicts in 1867, and the following year Governor Hampton's term ended. Wakeford reduced the size of the chain gangs, and the system returned to what it had been under Henderson.

In 1872 Wakeford was transferred to the Colonial Office, leaving the responsibilities of the comptroller general's position to his office's chief clerk, W. B. Fauntleroy. Fauntleroy was confirmed as acting comptroller general later that year. In December 1877 the office of comptroller general was abolished, with Fauntleroy superannuated; his duties were passed on to the superintendent, John F. Stone, who was later appointed comptroller of convicts. With the transfer of Fremantle Prison to the colonial government in 1886, the role of the comptroller was replaced by that of the sheriff, responsible for all of the prisons in the colony. By the 1890s, the sheriff also held the post of inspector of prisons. The position of comptroller general was split off from the sheriff's office in early 1911, following the retirement of Sheriff Octavius Burt. In 1971, the Prisons Department was renamed the Department of Corrections, restructured, and the position of comptroller general was replaced with director of the department.

=== Superintendent ===
While the comptroller, sheriff, or director was responsible for the overall convict or prison system, largely centred around Fremantle Prison, the responsibility of the prison itself lay with the superintendent. Thomas Hill Dixon was the first superintendent of convicts, and was succeeded by Henry Maxwell Lefroy in 1859. Both men operated a prisoner classification system, until at least 1865, based on the type of convict, as well as their conduct and quality of their work. When Fremantle became a colonial prison, there was a restaffing, and as per other colonial prisons, there was no attempt at classification, until the end of the 19th century. (Note: As recommended by the 1899 Royal Commission report) W. A. George was superintendent at this time, appointed in 1897 amidst increasing population, prisoners, and escapes. While some writers (Note: Such as Stewart and Thomas in Imprisonment in Western Australia) consider George a repressive figure, who instigated little or no reform except as a result of the Royal Commission, others (Note: Such as Lynne Steveson in Fremantle Prison in the 1890s) take the view that he was appointed at an inexpedient time for reform, with his endeavours opposed by his superiors.

Hugh Hann was appointed superintendent following the retirement of George in 1911. Hann had prison experience outside Western Australia, and oversaw a period of reform at Fremantle Prison, working with a new Labor government and new comptroller general. Prisoner self-respect was an important concept for Hann, who noted in his 1912 report that "all our efforts are thrown away unless we can make them feel that they are not mere brutes, and get them to hold their heads up again like men." Following a series of escapes in 1918, Hann was investigated by an enquiry, suspended, and charged with neglect of his duties; though eventually vindicated, his poor health ensured his retirement. Hann was succeeded by Andrew Badger, and remained in the position until 1933. Badger persisted with Hann's efforts for prisoner self-respect, with initiatives such as entertainment nights, where prisoners could see a films or concert. By the 1940s, the role of superintendent became a position filled through internal promotions.

== Officers ==
=== Pensioner guards ===
On convict ships, the convicts were guarded by pensioner guards, who were soldiers awarded pensions for their service in areas such as China, Crimea, and Afghanistan. Some remained in the military, but many opted to stay in the colony as settlers, having brought their wives and children with them. The pensioner guards were expected to help deal with any incidents of unrest at the prison.

=== Convict-era warders ===
The prison's officers were known as warders until the early 20th century. The first warders at Fremantle Prison, in the 1850s and 1860s, were a mixture of experienced men, who had guarded British prisons, and colonial men. There were varying levels of literacy and numeracy – no minimum standard was initially required. Warders lived in specially built terrace houses, within walking distance of the prison as their lives were just as regimented as the prisoners. They had to arrive on schedule, assemble for the superintendent, keep records of the convicts' behaviour and work, discipline prisoners, and face danger when prisoners refused to obey instructions. They were not paid well, and faced fines or dismissal for drinking alcohol, sleeping on the job, or other breaches of regulations.

=== Colonial prison warders ===
In the 1890s warders still have "little more freedom than the prisoners in their charge", due to the stringent living and working conditions, including ten- to twelve-hour working days. The warder's role became clearly defined in 1902, having previously been unwritten, and poorly known due to a high turnover rate in those immediately in charge of prisoners. Warders guarded against escapes, enforced discipline, oversaw prisoner work, and instructed inmates in trades. The warders were also supposed to be moral role models for prisoners, while maintaining a formal, distant, relationship.

=== 20th century officers ===
The nature of 20th century prison officers did not change much, with the job entailing a boredom-inducing daily routine focused on security. The most significant difference was that prison officers achieved representation through the Western Australian Prison Officers Union. The strength of the union was based on the ability to almost cripple the prison system through strike action, first taken in 1975. The union agenda went beyond improvements to pay and conditions, which were achieved, and pushed objectives and policies that contradicted official policy.

== Prisoners ==
=== Convicts ===
Convicts were introduced into Western Australia for three main purposes: inexpensive labour, additional labour, and an injection of British government spending into the local economy. During the initial years of transportation, convicts were generally young, from a rural background, and of good character, having only committed minor offences – potential future colonists, after their sentence had been served. By the 1860s the majority were older, more serious offenders from urban areas, and the final group of convicts, arriving in January 1868 on Hougoumont, included sixty-two Fenians, political prisoners considered to be "difficult and dangerous".

=== 19th century prisoners ===
Following the transfer of Fremantle Prison to local control in 1886, it became Western Australia's primary prison. Though some long term locally sentenced prisoners had been imprisoned there since 1858, in the late 1880s and 1890s the number of prisoners swelled dramatically. This increase predominately comprised prisoners serving shorter sentences of under three months. At the turn of the century, the majority of prisoners were "white Australian or European men, mostly working class, below the age of forty years and serving short sentences for minor offences". However, there was much diversity in the prisoner population: there were Chinese and other Asian prisoners, (Note: This arose from the importation of cheap Chinese labour from Singapore during the 1870s to 1890s. Once out of work, due to old age, poor health, expiration of their contract, or a refusal to work, they ended up as the colony's responsibility, some as prisoners, others as paupers or patients.) a small number of Aboriginal men, (Note: Less than 1% of the total prisoner population, as Aboriginal prisoners were considered an inconvenience at Fremantle, and generally segregated to the Rottnest Island prison.) eighty juveniles, (Note: Those up to the age of 21, including some less than 17 years old) as well as range of people with low social status – "paupers, deaf mutes, the retarded" (Note: As described by Robert Virtue in "Lunacy and Reform in Western Australia 1886–1903" (1977) cited in Megahey 2000) and "vagrants, lunatics and persons of weak intellect". (Note: So-called persons of "weak mind" were sent to Fremantle Prison for observation, though the prison was not equipped to handle them.) Poverty, drunkenness, behavioural issues, and recidivism were major contributing factors in imprisonment for minor offences.

=== 20th century prisoners ===
The number of prisoners in 1897 was 379, and Inspector of Prisons James Roe viewed the prison as "inconveniently full"; despite a large expansion of the prison system, the problem of overcrowding remained throughout the 20th century. So too did Western Australia's high incarceration rate relative to the rest of Australia. The nature of prisoners changed, with three times the proportion of 16- to 19-year-olds in 1984 compared to 1898, and a growing over-representation of Aboriginal prisoners to nearly half the prison population. (Note: Of the total prison population, the proportion of Aboriginal prisoners was 5.4% in 1910, 16% in 1968, more than 30% in 1977, and at least 45% in 1982.) The sentences also increased in length, such that in 1984 more than 80% of inmates were serving more than a year. In the 1970s and 1980s, there was an increasing number of prisoners committed for violent crimes, but still a minority of the population. Both staff and prisoners, however, perceived a notable increase in violence during these years, coinciding with the rise of illegal drugs in prison, and of sentences for drug-related offences.

== See also ==
- Architecture of Fremantle Prison
- History of Fremantle Prison
- List of executions at Fremantle Prison
- Riots at Fremantle Prison
