= Tunnel network =

Aspect of transportation infrastructure

In transport, tunnels can be connected together to form a tunnel network. These can be used in mining to reach ore below ground, in cities for underground rapid transit systems, in sewer systems, in warfare to avoid enemy detection or attacks, as maintenance access routes beneath sites with high ground-traffic such as airports and amusement parks, or to extend public living areas or commercial access while avoiding outdoor weather.

== In warfare ==
=== Sieges ===
Tunnel networks were sometimes developed during siege warfare, even dating back to classical antiquity. Starting with a single tunnel being dug to undermine a wall that might be detected by the defenders and met with counter-tunnels, leading to tunnel warfare. Defenders might first create a series of underground listening posts to preempt such mining attacks.

=== Trench systems ===
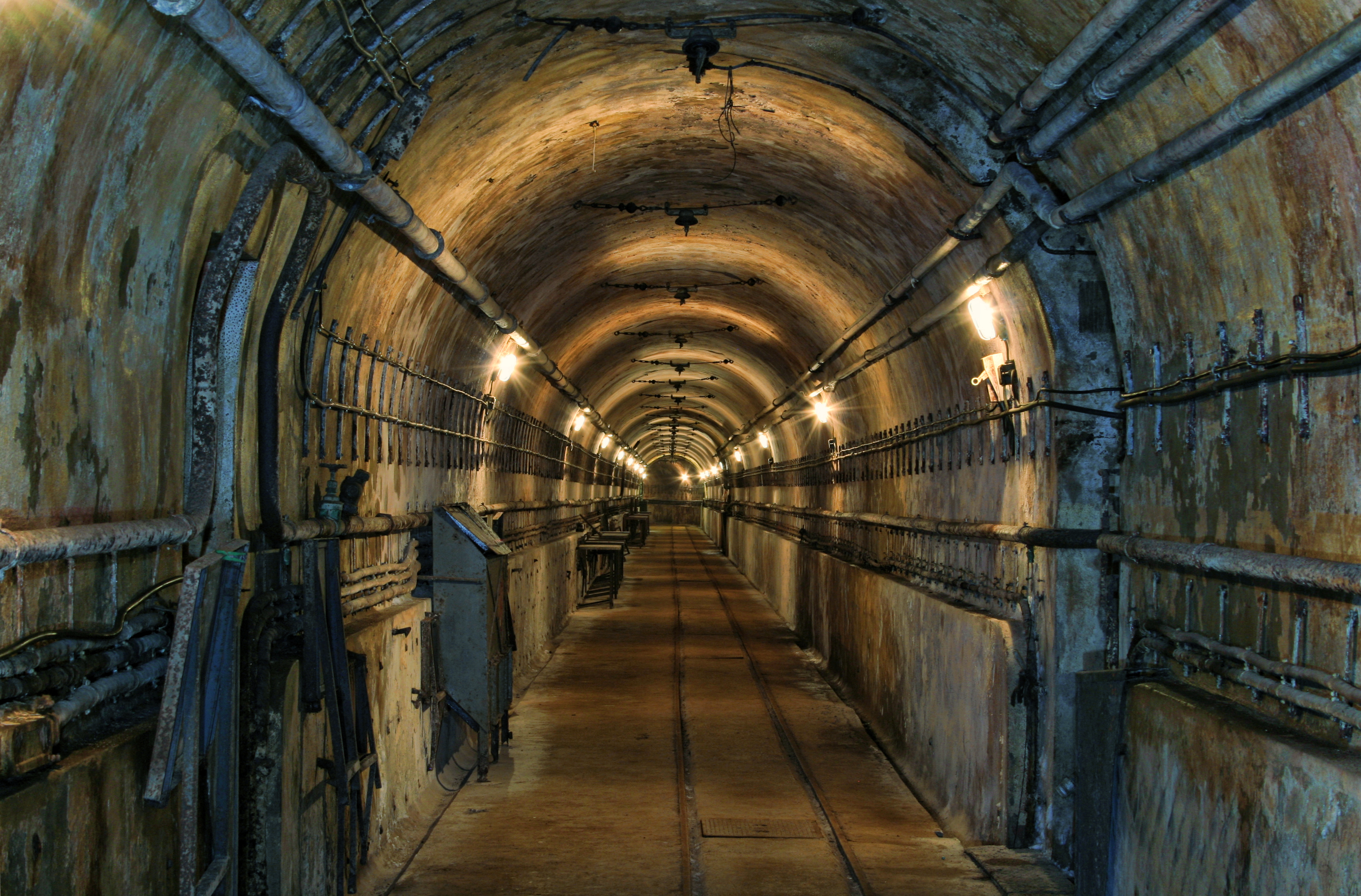
Connecting tunnel under Ouvrage Michelsberg, a fortress of the Maginot Line

Any time the use of trenches becomes extensive, this naturally leads to connecting them with tunnel networks for safe passage both along the trench lines and with rear areas. In World War I, when given enough time and resources, the underground components of the defenses could become more extensive than those above ground.

The French Maginot Line, constructed from 1929 to 1939, was a chain of fortresses, bunkers, retractable turrets, outposts, obstacles, and sunken artillery emplacements, all linked by an extensive shell-proof tunnel network. It included underground barracks, shelters, ammo dumps and depots, and even had its own underground narrow gauge railways.

=== In Vietnam ===
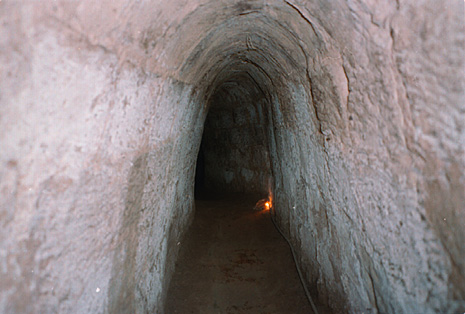
Part of the tunnel complex at Củ Chi, this tunnel has been made wider and taller to accommodate tourists.

The tunnels of Củ Chi are an immense network of connecting tunnels located in the Củ Chi District of Ho Chi Minh City (Saigon), Vietnam, and are part of a much larger network of tunnels that underlie much of the country. The Củ Chi tunnels were the location of several military campaigns during the Vietnam War, and were the Viet Cong's base of operations for the Tết Offensive in 1968.

The tunnels were used by Viet Cong soldiers as hiding spots during combat, as well as serving as communication and supply routes, hospitals, food and weapon caches and living quarters for numerous North Vietnamese fighters. The tunnel systems were of great importance to the Viet Cong in their resistance to American forces, and helped to counter the growing American military effort.

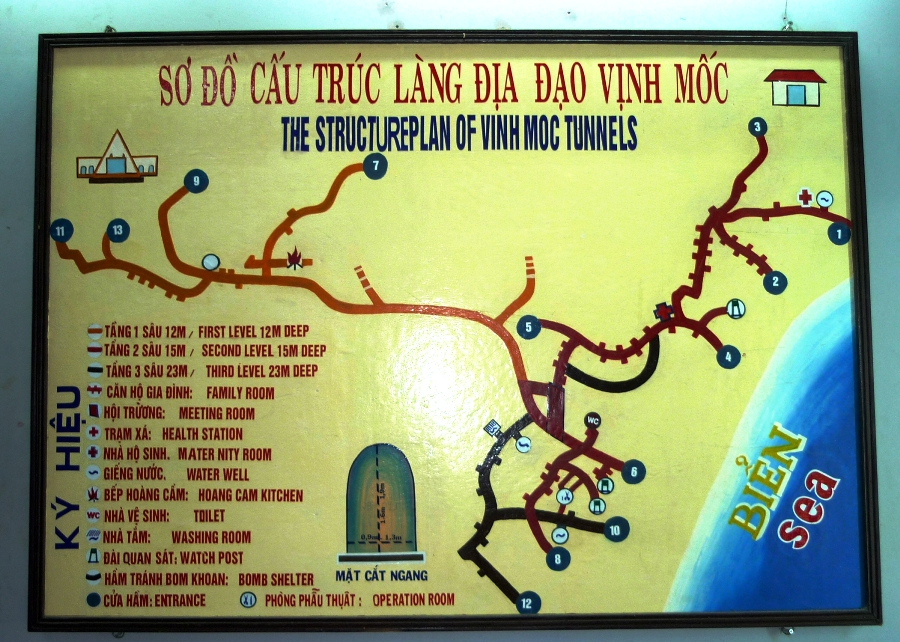
The Structureplan of Vinh Moc Tunnels.

The Vịnh Mốc tunnels are a tunnel complex in Quảng Trị, Vietnam. During the Vietnam War it was strategically located on the border of North Vietnam and South Vietnam. The tunnels were built to shelter people from the intense bombing of Son Trung and Son Ha communes in Vinh Linh county of Quảng Trị Province in the Vietnamese Demilitarized Zone. The American forces believed the villagers of Vinh Moc were supplying food and armaments to the North Vietnamese garrison on the island of Con Co which was in turn hindering the American bombers on their way to bomb Hanoi. The idea was to force the villagers of Vinh Moc to leave the area but as is typical in Vietnam there was nowhere else to go.

The villagers initially dug the tunnels to move their village 10 metres underground but the American forces designed bombs that burrowed down 10 metres. Eventually against these odds, the villagers moved the village to a depth of 30 metres. It was constructed in several stages beginning in 1966 and used until early 1972. The complex grew to include wells, kitchens, rooms for each family and spaces for healthcare. Around 60 families lived in the tunnels; as many as 17 children were born inside the tunnels.

The tunnels were a success and no villagers lost their lives. The only direct hit was from a bomb that failed to explode; the resulting hole was utilized as a ventilation shaft.
Three levels of tunnels were eventually built.

=== In the 2014 Israel–Gaza conflict ===
During the 2014 Israel–Gaza conflict, the Israeli military uncovered and destroyed 32 cross-border tunnels that went on for miles beneath Gaza and reached into Israeli territory. According to intelligence officials, Israeli engineers are developing a system that could detect and destroy cross-border tunnels for which the Israeli government has reportedly spent more than $250 million since 2004.

=== Use by ISIS ===
A network of caves beneath the cities of Mosul and Badana were built by ISIS. The terrorist group avoids battlefield engagements, preferring to hide in such tunnels safe from satellite detection, drone strikes and artillery, managed to maintain supply lines and communication with other areas under their control.

== Other examples ==
- Mines of Paris, France
- Erdstall, Europe (mainly Germany and Austria)
- Underground Great Wall of China, China
- Houston tunnel system, United States
- Cheyenne Mountain Complex, United States
- Mount Weather Emergency Operations Center, United States
- Raven Rock Mountain Complex, United States
- Iranian underground missile bases
- Chicago Tunnel Company, a disused freight network of tunnels beneath every street of downtown Chicago

== See also ==
- Underground city – Series of linked subterranean spaces
- Underground living – Living below the ground's surface
- Urban exploring – Exploration of hidden or abandoned buildings and structures
- Emergency management – Dealing with all humanitarian aspects of emergencies
- 3D scanning – Scanning of an object or environment to collect data on its shape
- Secret passage – Hidden routes used for stealthy travel
- Souterrain – Underground structure associated mainly with the Atlantic Iron Age
- Infrared thermography – Infrared imaging used to reveal temperature
- Rapid transit – High-capacity public transport
- Smuggling tunnel – Secret passages used for the smuggling of goods and people
- Sewerage – Infrastructure that conveys sewage or surface runoff using sewers
- Trench – Excavated channel in ground
- Unattended ground sensor – Military technology
