= Pardelup Prison Farm =

Prison farm in Western Australia

Coordinates: 34°38′12″S 117°22′58″E

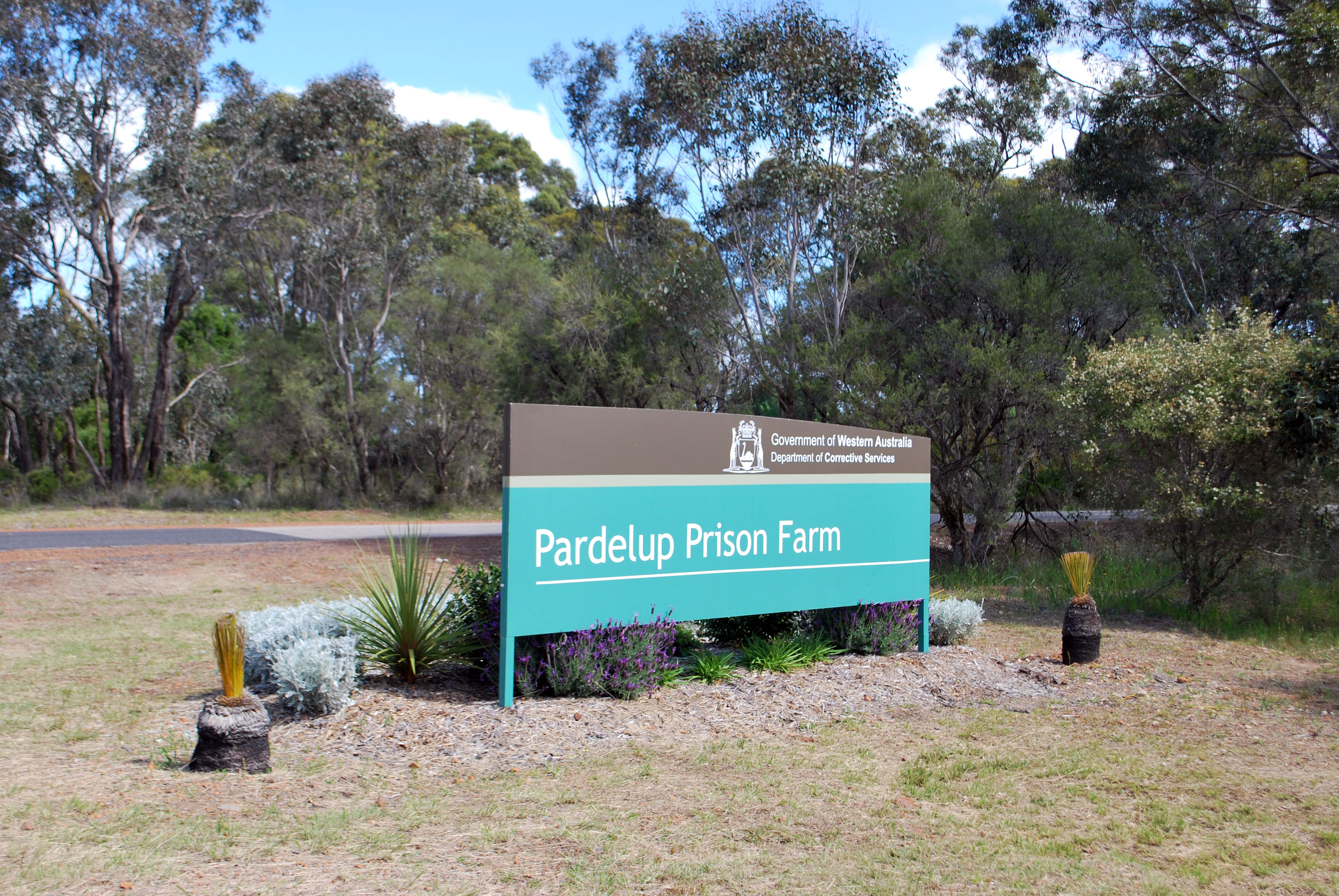
- Pardelup Prison Farm entrance
- Interactive map of Pardelup Prison Farm
- Location: Forest Hill, Western Australia
- Status: Operational
- Security class: Minimum
- Capacity: 84
- Opened: 1927
- Managed by: Department of Corrective Services, Western Australia

Pardelup Prison Farm is an Australian minimum-security prison located on a 2,600-hectare (6,425-acre) mixed farming operation 27 kilometres (17 mi) west of Mount Barker, Western Australia. The prison is unique to the region, with its focus on providing constructive work for prisoners to help to reintegrate into the community.

The site was originally the home of Andrew Muir (1802–1874), a district pioneer and flour-miller, and became a prison farm in 1927.

A work camp of the same name commenced in June 2002, initially accommodating 12 prisoners, and provides services to the Shire of Plantagenet. It was reopened as a prison farm in 2010 and has a capacity of 84 minimum security prisoners.

In April 2020, during the COVID-19 pandemic in Australia, prisoners made 100 simple desks over two weeks for children who were having to study at home due to school closures, under Superintendent Jodi Miller.
