= Bandyup Women's Prison =

Women's prison in Perth, Western Australia

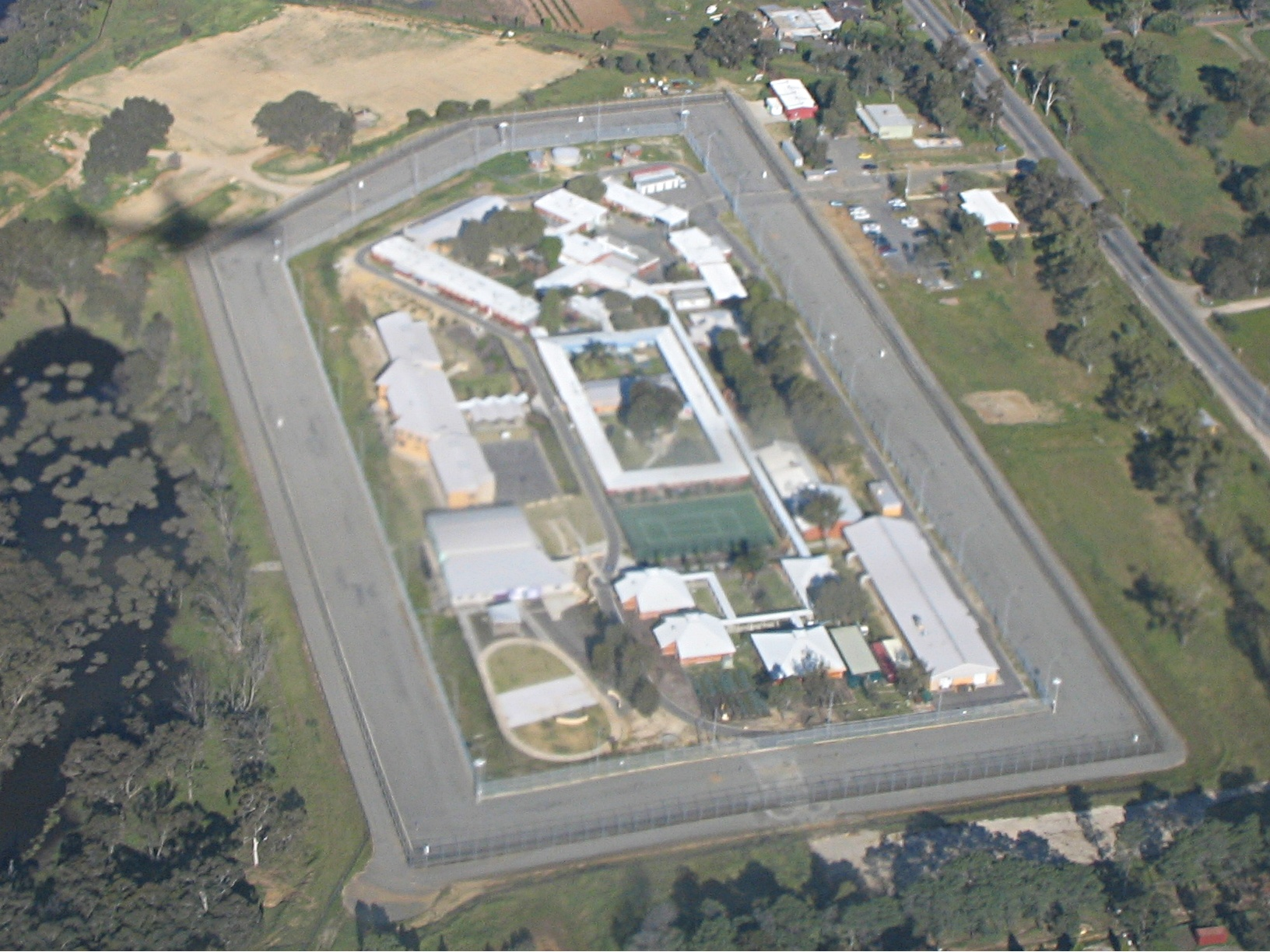

- Location in Western Australia
- Location: West Swan, Western Australia; 31°51′44″S 115°59′44″E
- Status: Operational
- Security class: Mixed (female); Maximum/medium/minimum (female)
- Capacity: 259
- Opened: January 1970
- Managed by: Department of Justice, Western Australia

Bandyup Women's Prison is located in the northeastern rural Perth suburb of West Swan, Western Australia. Prior to its construction, the female prisoners were at Fremantle Prison, which was overcrowded and offered women limited opportunities.

Bandyup Women's Prison holds sentenced and remand prisoners of all security classifications. It is run as a maximum security prison, though only 10% of the women are categorised as maximum security. Bandyup Women's Prison is one of two prisons in the Perth Metropolitan area for women on remand or that have been sentenced. Melaleuca Women's Prison was built in 2016, as a standalone facility, built on what was previously Units 11 and 12 of Hakea Prison in Canning Vale, Western Australia. The prison is inspected every three years by the state Office for the Inspector of Custodial Services.

== History ==
Women prisoners in Western Australia were housed at Fremantle Gaol until a Women's Rehabilitation Centre was opened in 1969. Bandyup Training Centre, the precursor to Bandyup Women's Prison, was opened in 1971. It was originally built to hold 68 women. In 1998, following civil society agitation, an urgency motion and debate was held in state parliament about the conditions at Bandyup. The prison was so overcrowded that women were sleeping on mattresses on the floor. A major refurbishment of the prison with the addition of new units, completed in 2003, brought the total design capacity to 180. Not long after, however, overcrowding again became an issue and continues to this day.

== Overcrowding ==
Women were still sleeping on mattresses on the floor in 2019. Despite the Minister for Corrective Services assuring this was not the case in Parliament on 19 February, the prison would continue this practice while there was no cap on the number of women that could be held there. In early 2015, the Department of Corrective Services stopped using the phrase "operational capacity" and starting using the phrase "total capacity", which includes beds that have been added to the design capacity on an ad hoc basis. The total capacity published on the DCS website on 23 January 2015, was 321, though the total population at Bandyup on any one day was consistently higher than this. Bunk beds have been installed in various units and were planned to be installed in most cells of the prison, including cells designed for single occupancy. The beds added in unit 4 were so close to the ceiling that the occupant is not able to sit upright in bed and a ceiling light was about 10 centimetres (3.9 in) away from the head of the bed. As there was no desk or chair in these units, these occupants are not able to sit down in the cell. The increase in beds came without a corresponding increase in other infrastructure, such as showering facilities, or services, such as nursing services or access to phones. While waiting for bunk beds, women had been sleeping on plastic-covered mattresses on the floor. In units 1 and 2, women that sleep on the floor would have their head next to the toilet. These units were occupied mostly by Aboriginal women.

In 2016 Melaleuca Remand and Reintegration Facility was opened, which was intended to reduce the pressure on Bandyup.

== Notable inmates ==
- Catherine Birnie
- Brenda Hodge, until 1988
