= Western Australian Prison Officers' Union =

- Western Australian Prison Officers' Union of Workers
- Founded: 1934
- Headquarters: Belmont, Western Australia
- Location: Australia
- Members: 2,721
- Key people: Andy Smith, Secretary / Derick McAteer, President
- Affiliations: {{ubl|UnionsWA|Australian Council of Trade Unions|}
- Website: www.wapou.asn.au

The Western Australian Prison Officers’ Union (WAPOU) is a registered trade union founded in 1934 in Western Australia. The union represents employees within the prison services, including prison officers of Western Australia. The union is affiliated with the Australian Council of Trade Unions and UnionsWA. The union is part of the Prison Officers Association of Australasia (POAA), representing prison officers through Australia and New Zealand.

As of 2020 there are 2,721 registered members throughout the WA prison service in both private and public facilities.

== Aims and purpose ==
The union acts as a collective body to serve its registered members across both the private and public prison facilities. This includes engagement with government proceedings and media coverage involving issues that impact or are affiliated with prison affairs and controversies.

It runs a multitude of campaigns that represent the values of the union. These campaigns include matters such as overcrowding, staff safety, privatisation, and mental health support for officers.

The union has a social media presence, which utilizes mass communication to reach out to both members and the wider public that may share an interest in prison affairs in Western Australia. An ongoing social media campaign of WAPOU's is their "Respect the Risk" campaign, which provides a spotlight on the roles and responsibilities of prison officers within the field. This enables community involvement outside of the WAPOU's members.

== Executive and office members ==
=== Union office ===
- Secretary: Andy Smith
- President: Derick McAteer
- Assistant Secretary: Beven Hanlon
- Training officer: Greg Holder
- Industrial Officer: Andrea Wyllie
- Finance Manager: Pem Choki
- Administration assistant: Yvonne Borowski

=== Executive office ===
- Vice President: Peter Nield
- Treasurer: Boyd Burns
- Executive members: Dennis Dow, Steve Parker and Tim Sheridan

== Member obligations ==
=== Conditions of membership ===
Individuals who are considered eligible for membership into the union are employees within a prison or prison services within Western Australia. A member's membership is revoked upon leaving their position within the prison services. In the event of an individual wanting to end their membership, a written resignation is required with 14 days notice. Individuals are still responsible for any subscriptions or levies leading up to and including the date of exit.

Past members of the union can be nominated and awarded by the executive and state office as "life members" after 15 years of continuous membership. To be awarded this status, a member must also demonstrate at least 10 years of service to the running of the union and its events.

According to the Fair Work (Registered Organisations) Act 2009 and the Fair Work (Registered Organisations) Regulations 2009, the union is obligated to keep an updated register of all new and current members details (name and postal address). However, the register of members is not available for public access, for reasons of confidentiality.

=== Member contributions and fees ===
Upon membership allocation, members of the union consent to a fortnightly deduction of contributions towards the union. Reductions of contributions can be approved by the executive members in the case of special considerations.

==== Entrance fees ====
Entrance fees and contributions are calculated based on the annual salary and employment plans of individual members and paid accordingly fortnightly.

However, entrance contributions will not amount to equal more than 1% of a senior officer's annualised salary, regardless of positions.

==== Funeral benefit fund ====
This fund is known as the Prison Officers Funeral Benefit Fund (POFBF); all current members of WAPOU are automatic members of this fund. Past members of the union whose membership exceed seven years prior to their exit, are still considered members of this funeral fund.

The fortnightly contribution of the POFBF is decided upon in the WAPOU annual general meeting (AGM) led by the executive members of the union. The minimum contribution is $1.00 per contribution payment.

A funeral benefit amount is decided by the executive committee, led by the secretary and the benefit is later paid to the member's dependants and/or the member's personal legal representative.

==== Death benefit levy ====
Upon official notice of death of a WAPOU member, all members contribute a payment of $15.00 each.

As part of the application process, all members must nominate a recipient of their death benefit. If a recipient is not listed, with discretion in mind the union may nominate next of kin to receive the levy. If within six months the levy has not been claimed by either next of kin or nominated recipient, the funds may be redistribution towards the general fund of the union.

== Election and meeting procedures ==
=== Union meetings ===
The WAPOU hold multiple meetings throughout the year, which members are expected to attend and participate in. An AGM is held in the third quarter of each year and quarterly general meetings are held in April, July and October. All voting within these meetings is conducted by a show of hands.

=== Union elections ===
The elections are run according to the Union Elections Regulations 1986 with the results being announced at the AGM. A returning officer is recruited by the executive council to run the ballot system of the election. The returning officer is not required to be a member of the union and must demonstrate a partial position within the election. Two additional scrutineers, who are active members of the union, assist the returning officer. The votes are collected through an anonymous postal ballot and counted by the "first past the post" system.

== Historical timeline and development ==
=== The rehabilitative era ===
The prison reform movement of the 1970s, the "rehabilitative era" instilled the shift from punishment of offenders to providing services to offenders to assist in transition outside of prison. Services such as legal aid and psychologists were incorporated into Western Australian prison stays for offenders.

The union voiced within the Western Australian Prison Officers Union Newsletter (April 1973) concerns that the inclusion of external services would pose a threat to security and thus posed a threat to the welfare and safety of its officers.

=== Prisons Act 1981 ===
The state government introduced the Prison Act 1981, which listed the state's expectations of prison officer's roles and responsibility. Prison officers were expected to take an oath of allegiance towards the new act. The WAPOU publicly argued against the introduction of this new act; an article was placed in The West Australian newspaper on 16 November 1981 by the union stating the act breached basic civil rights. The outcome of WAPOU public action, created an amendment to the initial act. The act was amended that only newly recruited officers had to take the oath of allegiance.

== Campaigns ==
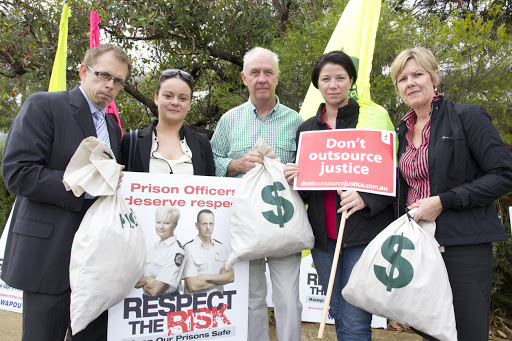
WAPOU members and supporters campaigning against the privatisation of WA prisons, 2012

Prison officers within the public system are restricted in their ability to voice concerns that may arise within their employment. This is enforced within the Prison Regulations Act 1982. The union as a collective body can refute this act and speak on behalf of its members as prison officers and discuss usually barred conversations.

=== Overcrowding ===
In 2016 the WAPOU placed a formal enquiry for the state government to investigate the prison population within Western Australia with concerns of overcrowding and poor staff to offender ratio, WA Today reported that maximum security prisons in WA are frequently understaffed by 40 officers daily. An independent investigation was conducted by the Office Inspector of Custodial Services into WAPOU's enquiry, the report found that as of 30 June 2016, Western Australian prisons were at 148% of their design capacity. This finding was disputed by the Department of Corrective Services; the department further stated the budget did not allow for prison capacity to be readjusted. The WAPOU state that overcrowding is not only dangerous for its officers but also the rehabilitation capacity of the offenders.

==== "Respect the Risk" campaign ====
The union's long standing social media campaign, "Respect the Risk" was created in 2014 as a response to the mass staffing shortage within both the Casuarina and Hakea prisons. The two prisons were forced into lockdown, where inmates were locked in cells for up to 20 hours a day due to the facilities being short staffed.

The campaign is predominantly run on the union's Facebook and Twitter accounts, campaigning for the rights of prison officers.

=== Privatisation ===
WAPOU's decision-making capacity is limited to the public domain. Under the Department of Corrective Services Prison Officers’ Enterprise Agreement 2013, all decisions involving public prisons within WA must be made with correspondence with the union. This agreement does not extend to prisons within private system; this agreement reduces the operating decision power of the union. The majority of prisons within Western Australia belong to the public sector, however two are operated by a private operator, Serco Australia.

In the 1990s, the state government (Liberal/National Party coalition) and WAPOU agreed to a prison reform plan that would prohibit WA from privatising its prison systems until 1997. However, in 1999, The Prison Act Amendment Act was passed, which enabled the state government to begin construction of a new private facility, Acacia Prison, which later opened in 2001.

There was an initial pay gap between the public and private officers; this was disputed by the union. Due to staff retention difficulty, a contract agreement was made that enabled Serco officers the same pay rises as those offered to public officers. All contract changes and agreements for Serco facilities are available online.

The union has disputed the distribution of funds devoted to employment within the private sector. A 2015 ERA report found that 53% of funds within the public system are dedicated to the employment of officers. The report proposed that private systems dedicated 3% of finances to the employment of their staff. This statement was refuted by independent audits from the private system in WA which stated that this claim could not be made as the operating funds of private facilities are not publicly disclosed.

==== Opposition to privatisation of prison transport ====
The Court Security and Custodial Services Act, WA was passed in 1999, enabling the employment of private prison transportation. Since 2000, WAPOU has released various statements to the state government regarding their opposition to the privatisation of prison transport, covering topics of concern such as failure to provide services resulting in last minute cancellations to hospital appointments and late arrivals which impact the schedules of prisoner intake.

=== Mental health of prison officers ===
The union has raised concerns regarding the lack of mental health access available to prison officers in comparison to other frontline workers such as police officers.

WAPOU secretary Andy Smith has campaigned for the public and government to better understand the traumatic and distressing circumstances prison officers find themselves in whilst on duty from fights, riots, and self-injury of prisoners. In 2018 Smith reflected on the twelve WA prison officers who have taken their lives over the past 14 years. The union argues that staff shortages and overcrowding only escalate the pressures of the job.

In 2017, the union held an educational seminar for its members regarding mental health coping mechanisms and indicators of mental health issues. The seminar included presenters from a variety of mental health services such as Beyond Blue, the Black Dog Institute, WA Mental Health Association, WorkSafe and Black Dog Ride. Almost 200 members attended and participated in the seminar. In 2018, the union launched the first internal training for mental health for prison officers. The Western Australian government has supported the unions movement to become a registered training organisation, offering mental health training to its members. The program is referred to as the ‘Stand T. A. L. R.’ training. The acronym stands for:

- Talk: encouraging members to reach out to other members when in need of assistance
- Ask: encouraging members to check in with members who may need help
- Listen: encouraging members to be attentive to other members as well as family members who may be affected by their line of work
- Refer: encouraging seeking professional help

The training program has been shown to over 1000 correctional staff since 2017. The program has also been adopted within New Zealand prisons as well.

== Decision-making power and state criticisms ==
The union has face wider criticism from governing bodies within Western Australian as having too much operational power over any decisions associated with reform of prison facilities.

As a union body they act for the benefits and interests of their members; this responsibility does not extend to other operating bodies such as ministers and commissioners.

WAPOU's decision-making capacity is limited to the public domain. Under the Department of Corrective Services Prison Officers' Enterprise Agreement 2013, all decisions involving public prisons within WA must be made with correspondence with the union. This agreement does not extend to prisons within private system, reducing the operating decision power of the union.
