= Fremantle Prison =

Former prison in Fremantle, Western Australia

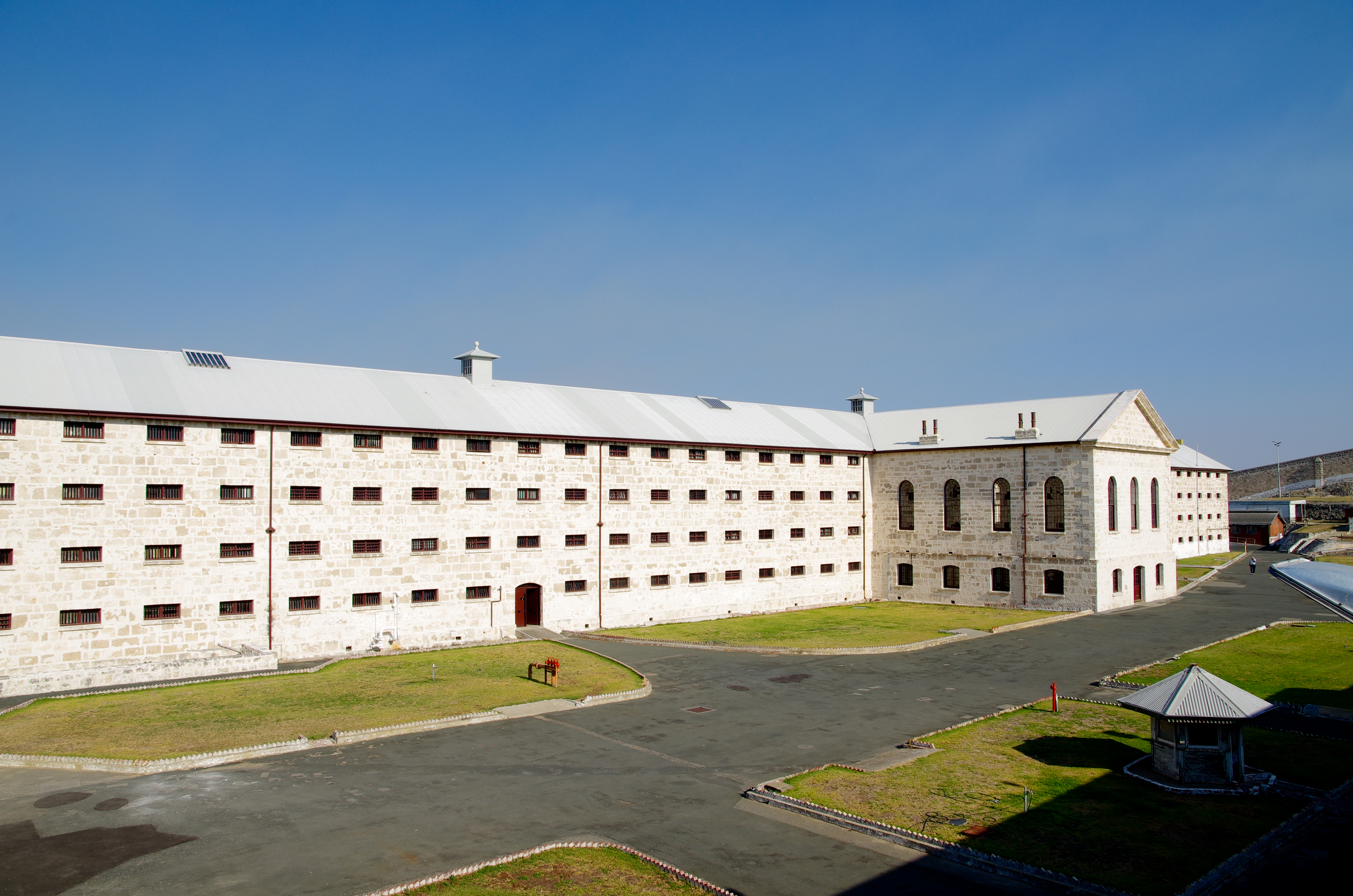
- Main Cell Block

- Location of Fremantle Prison in Perth, Western Australia
- Fremantle Prison (●) is located just north of Fremantle Hospital.
- Location: Fremantle, Western Australia; 32.055014°S 115.753487°E
- Status: Closed; heritage site
- Security class: Maximum
- Opened: 1855
- Closed: 30 November 1991
- Managed by: Department of Planning, Lands and Heritage
- Website: fremantleprison.com.au

UNESCO World Heritage Site
- Type: Cultural
- Criteria: iv, vi
- Designated: 2010 (34th session)
- Part of: Australian Convict Sites
- Reference no.: 1306
- Region: Asia-Pacific

Western Australia Heritage Register
- Type: State Registered Place
- Designated: 30 June 1995
- Reference no.: 1014

Fremantle Prison, sometimes referred to as Fremantle Gaol or Fremantle Jail, is a former Australian prison and World Heritage Site in Fremantle, Western Australia. The site includes the prison cellblocks, gatehouse, perimeter walls, cottages, and tunnels. It was initially used for convicts transported from Britain, but was transferred to the colonial government in 1886 for use for locally-sentenced prisoners. Royal Commissions were held in 1898 and 1911, and instigated some reform to the prison system, but significant changes did not begin until the 1960s. The government department in charge of the prison underwent several reorganisations in the 1970s and 1980s, but the culture of Fremantle Prison was resistant to change. Growing prisoner discontent culminated in a 1988 riot with guards taken hostage, and a fire that caused $1.8 million worth of damage. The prison closed in 1991, replaced by the new maximum-security Casuarina Prison.

The prison was administered by a comptroller general, sheriff, or director, responsible for the entire convict or prison system in Western Australia, and a superintendent in charge of the prison itself. Prison officers, known as warders in the 19th century, worked under stringent conditions until they achieved representation through the Western Australian Prison Officers' Union. Convicts were initially of good character as potential future colonists, but less desirable convicts were eventually sent. As a locally-run prison, Fremantle's population was generally short-sentenced white prisoners in the 1890s, with very few Aboriginal prisoners. By the late 20th century, most prisoners were serving longer sentences, a higher proportion of them were violent, and Aboriginal people were present in large numbers.

Prison life at Fremantle was extremely regulated. Meals were an important part of the day, eaten in the cells throughout the operational life of the prison. Convict or prisoner labour was used on public infrastructure works until around 1911; subsequently, only work inside the prison was allowed, though there was never enough to fully occupy the inmates. Punishments varied over the years, with flogging and time in irons eventually replaced by lengthening of sentences and deprivation of visitors or entertainment. More than 40 hangings were carried out at Fremantle Prison, which was Western Australia's only lawful place of execution between 1888 and 1984. Prominent escapees included Moondyne Joe, as well as John Boyle O'Reilly and six other Fenians in the 19th century, and Brenden Abbott in 1989. There have been various riots and other disturbances, with major riots causing damage in 1968 and 1988.

Since 1991, Fremantle Prison has been conserved as a recognised heritage site, and various restoration works have been undertaken. New uses have been found for some buildings within the prison, which has also become a significant tourist attraction. The process of obtaining World Heritage listing as part of the Australian Convict Sites submission focused historical interpretation and conservation efforts on the prison's convict era (1850 – 1886), at the expense of its more recent history, including Aboriginal prisoners held there.

== Architecture ==
=== Layout ===
Fremantle Prison buildings, wall, and tunnels. North is at the left side of this diagram. Cell blocks Workshops Hospital Reservoir building Tunnels Wall Gatehouse and houses

Fremantle Prison was built on a land grant of about 15 hectares (36 acres) from limestone quarried on-site. A 4.6-metre-tall (15 ft) boundary wall encloses the prison grounds, with a gatehouse in the centre of the western wall, facing The Terrace. Other roads bounding the site are Knutsford Street to the north, Hampton Road to the east, and Fothergill Street to the south. Cottages, which housed prison workers and officials, are located outside the wall either side of the gatehouse. Inside the walls, the parade ground is located east of the gatehouse. Beyond it is the Main Cell Block at the centre of the site, which contains two chapels. North of the main block is New Division, and west of that, in the north-western corner, is the former Women's Prison, previously the cookhouse, bakehouse and laundry. The hospital building stands in the north-eastern corner, while the former workshops are located in the south-eastern corner, as well as to the north of the gatehouse. A system of tunnels, constructed to provide fresh water from an aquifer, runs under the eastern edge of the site.

=== Buildings ===
==== Houses on The Terrace ====
North of the gatehouse, located at 2, 4, and 6 The Terrace, are cottages built in Victorian style, in contrast to the Georgian style of the other houses. Number 10 is a double-storey house, initially built in 1853 for the chaplain, but taken over by the superintendent in 1878 and later used by the prison administration. An adjoining single-storey at number 12, finished in 1854, was the home of the gatekeeper, located on the north side of the gatehouse. Number 16 The Terrace, south of the gatehouse, is a double-storey house that accommodated first the superintendent, and later the resident magistrate. It remained in use as housing for prison officers until the 1970s. Number 18, the southernmost house on The Terrace, and number 8, the northernmost of the initial buildings, both featured two sitting rooms, three bedrooms, and two dressing rooms, as well as a kitchen, water closet and shed, but with mirrored layouts. Number 18 was expanded with additions built in the 1890s.

==== Gatehouse ====
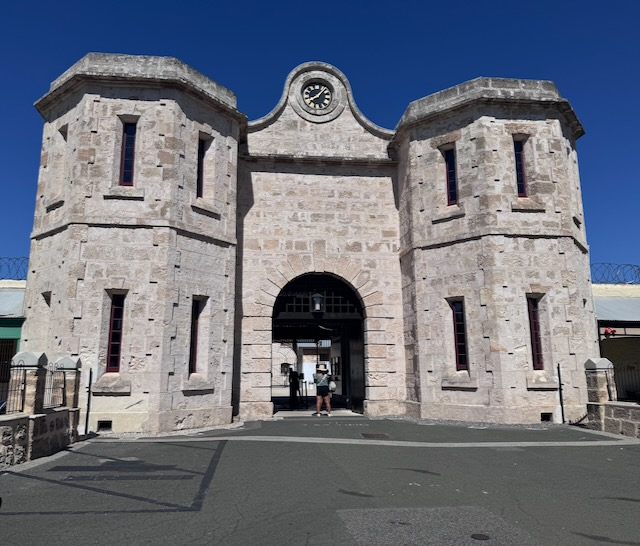
The entrance to Fremantle Prison is through a gatehouse in a medieval style.

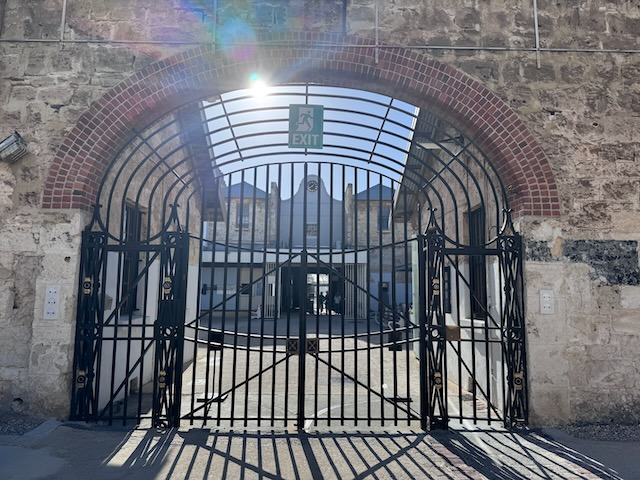
Iron gates were constructed by the Sappers and Miners in 1855.

The gatehouse and associated entry complex was constructed between 1854 and 1855 using convict labour. It was designed by Royal Engineer and Comptroller General Edmund Henderson, and constructed out of limestone. The gatehouse has two towers either side of a narrow gate, reminiscent of those found in 13th century English castles or walled cities. Iron that had been scavenged from shipwrecks was used to make the gate, while the clock at the top of the structure was imported from England. As the main entrance, the gatehouse has remained a significant feature and landmark; since the closure of the prison, it has housed a café and office areas. Restoration was carried out in 2005, preserving the original stone facade and removing non-original rendering.

==== Main Cell Block ====
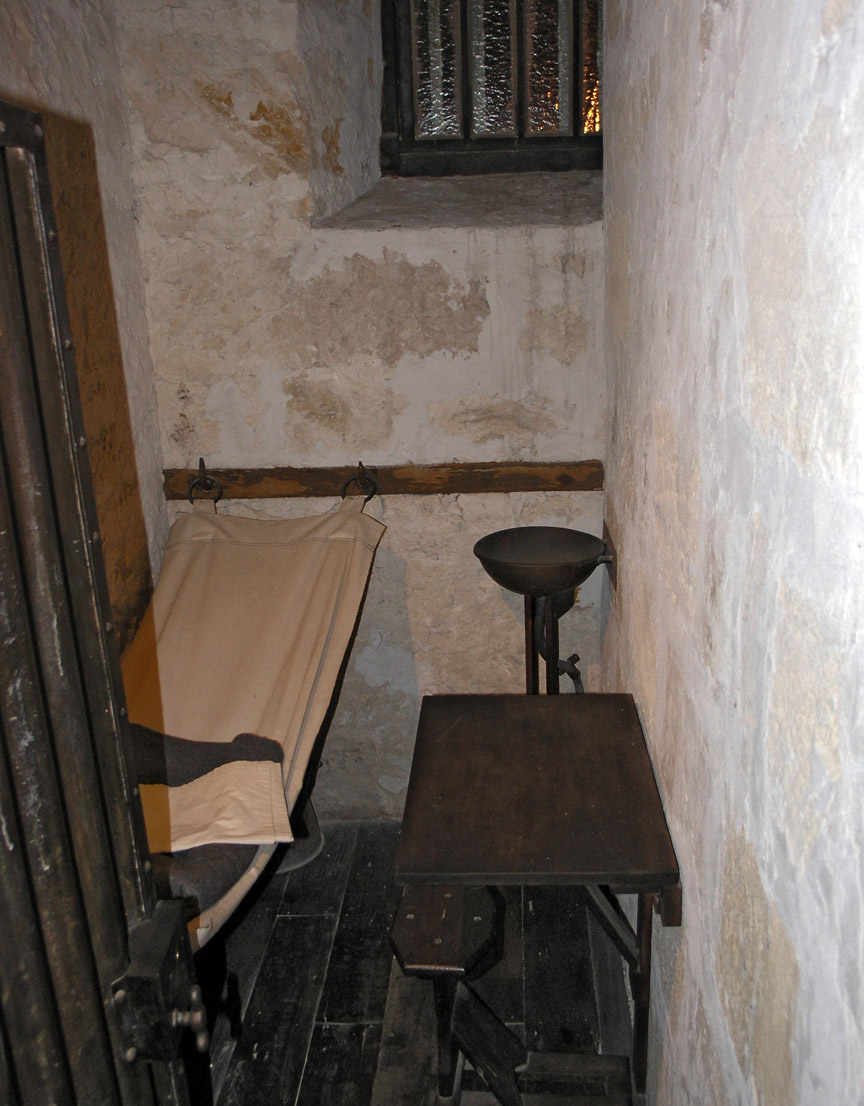
A re-creation of typical 1855 cell accommodation

Little-changed since its construction in the 1850s by convicts, the Main Cell Block was designed to hold up to 1000 prisoners. The central, four-storey high cell block is flanked on either end by large dormitory wards, called the Association Rooms. Here, as many as 80 men slept in hammocks, either as a reward for good behaviour or because they would soon receive their ticket of leave. In contrast, the cramped cells measured just 2.1 by 1.2 metres (7 by 4 ft). Although each cell initially had a basin connected to running water, the installation was before the advent of S-bends; the smells coming up the pipes led to their removal by the 1860s. Following a Royal Commission, the cells were enlarged by removing a dividing wall from between two cells. Electric lighting was installed in the 1920s, but there were never any toilets – buckets were used for the duration of the prison's operation. Since the prison's closure, six cells have been restored to represent the varying living conditions at different times in the prison's history. The main block also houses the gallows, solitary confinement cells, and two chapels – Anglican and Catholic.

==== New Division ====
Fremantle Prison's New Division building was constructed between 1904 and 1907, as a response to overcrowding. It also allowed prison administrators to implement the separate system, whereby prisoners were completely isolated for the first three months of their sentence. A panopticon in the exercise yard was initially used to facilitate this concept during the prisoners' hour of exercise each day. The system was not successful, and considered a dated prisoner management strategy, leading to its removal within five years. New Division was the first building to have electricity, with underground wiring. During World War II, the Australian Army appropriated the division, to keep their prisoners separate from the main population. In 1994 the building was retrofitted to cater for offices, small business premises, and meeting rooms.

==== Women's Prison ====
The north-western complex was originally a service area with a cookhouse, bakehouse and laundry, built in the 1850s. A place for women prisoners was needed following the closure of Perth Gaol and the transfer of prisoners to Fremantle. The buildings were converted to a prison, and a wall built around them, creating Western Australia's first separate prison for women. Population and crime growth led to them being extended in the 1890s and 1910s. The construction of Bandyup Women's Prison saw Fremantle's Women's Prison close in 1970, with the space used for education and assessment until the main prison's closure in 1991.

==== Hospital ====
Built between 1857 and 1859, the hospital was a crucial component of Fremantle Prison. Public works during the convict era relied on convict labour, which could only be provided if the convicts were healthy. From 1886 to 1903, medical services were relocated to the main cell block, with the former building used to keep invalids and female prisoners. The hospital was refurbished and reopened in 1904. It subsequently remained in continuous operation until the prison's closure in 1991.

==== Workshops ====
The original workshop was a blacksmith's shop, one of the first buildings to be constructed on the prison site. Later known as the East Workshops, other workshops included carpenter's, plumber's and painter's, a printing office, and from the 1850s, a metal shop. The West Workshops were built at the start of the twentieth century, providing more work for prisoners through a paint shop, mat maker, shoe maker, book binder and tailor shop. In 1993 the four northern workshops were adapted for use as TAFE art workshops.

=== Tunnels ===
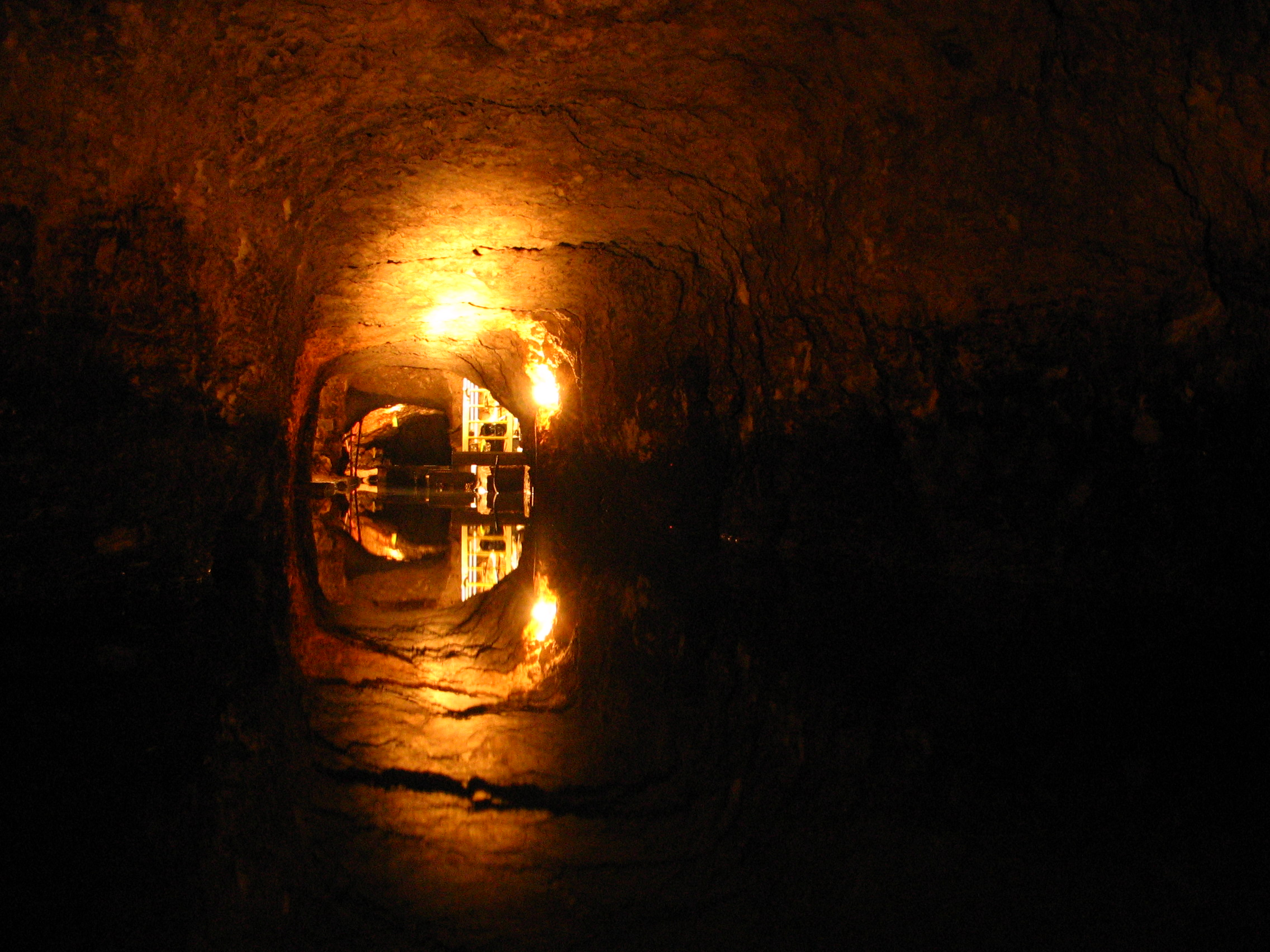
View inside the tunnels

In the 1850s, shafts were sunk into the limestone bedrock to provide the prison with fresh water from an aquifer, and a tank was installed in 1874 to offer the town of Fremantle an alternative water supply. Prisoners worked a pump to fill the tank, which was connected to the jetties through gravity-fed pipes. In 1896, a town reservoir was constructed on Swanbourne Street, fed from the prison by a triple-expansion steam-driven pump that could take more than 4.5 megalitres (1.2 million US gallons) per day from the prison tunnels. Prisoners, relieved of manual pumping, were employed to supply wood and stoke boilers. The tunnels were closed in 1910, though the groundwater continued to be used for the prison's gardens. In 1989, diesel leaking from nearby tanks was found to have contaminated the water; however, the pollution was largely cleared by 1996 through bioremediation. The tunnels were opened to tourists in mid-2005.

== History ==
=== 19th century ===
While the Swan River Colony was established as a "free settlement" (unlike the penal colonies on the east coast), by the 1840s demand for cheap labour overcame an early reluctance, and the colony agreed to accept some convicts from Britain. The arrival of the first convict ship Scindian on 2 June 1850 was unexpected, as a sailing ship that had been sent ahead had been blown off-course. The colony's Round House jail was full, so the 75 convicts had to be left on the ship until a temporary prison was built. Comptroller General of Convicts Edward Henderson looked for a place to build a permanent convict establishment, and ultimately settled on the current site, on a hill overlooking Fremantle.

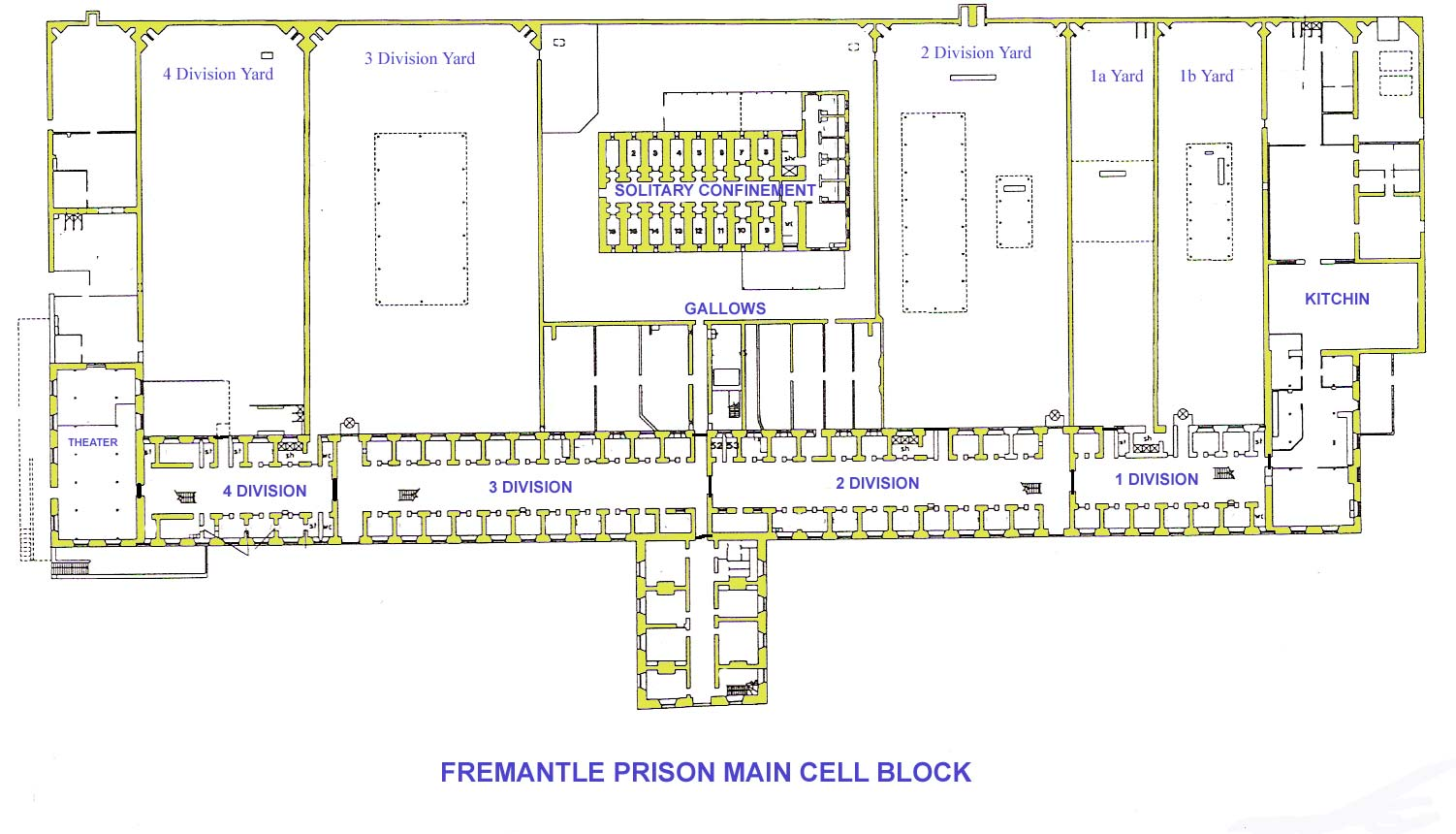
Main Cell Block internal arrangement

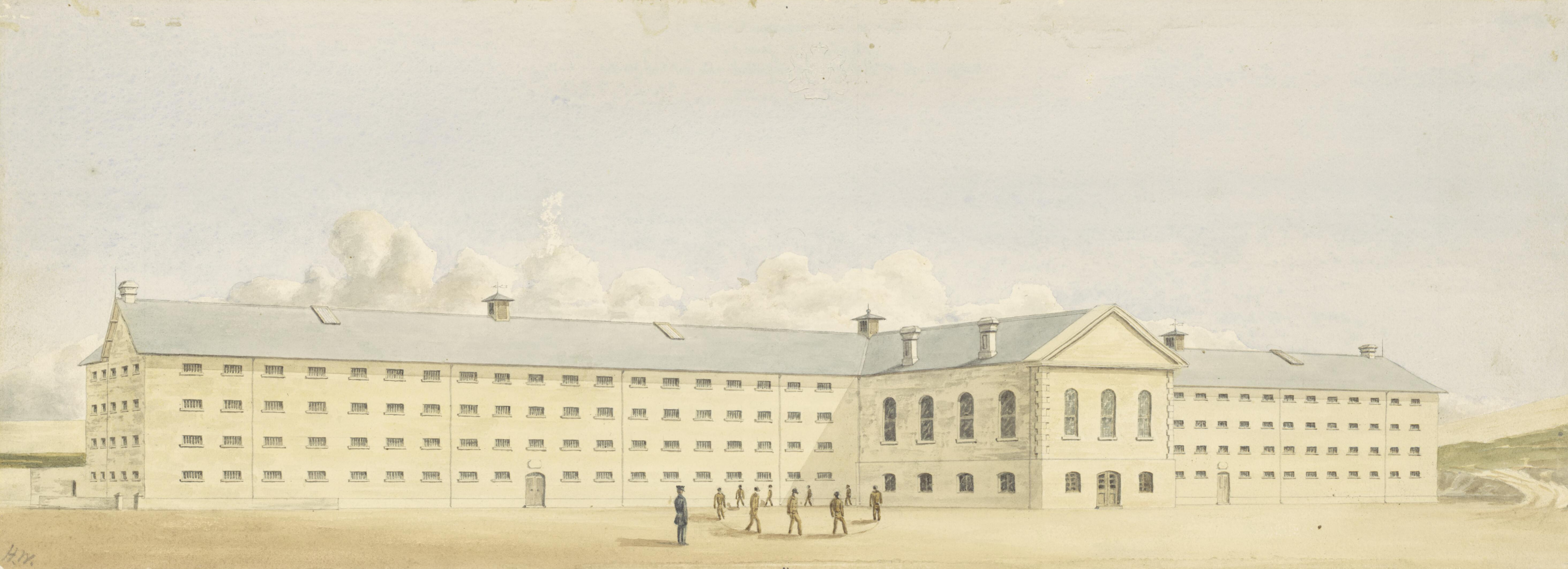
1859 watercolour of the Main Cell Block, by Henry Wray

The design for Fremantle Prison was based on the Pentonville Prison in Britain, but with diagonal cell blocks replaced with a four-storey linear structure, which would be the longest, tallest prison cell block in the southern hemisphere. Construction began in 1851, and work rapidly progressed following the arrival of the Royal Engineers later that year. They trained convicts to work with limestone, which was quarried on-site. The first priority was the construction of accommodation for Henderson and the prison warders, to relieve the expense of paying for private lodging.

The prison walls were constructed between 1853 and 1855, while the gatehouse and associated entry complex was built in 1854 and 1855. Construction of the southern half of the Main Cell Block began in 1853 and was finished in 1855, with prisoners transferred from the temporary prison on 1 June 1855. Construction of the northern wing followed. The Crimean War saw the Royal Engineers recalled, leaving only one of their number, Henry Wray, to oversee the building's construction, which was completed by the end of 1859.

During Western Australia's convict era, the prison was known as the Convict Establishment, and was used for prisoners transported from Britain. Longer term locally-sentenced prisoners were also held there from 1858, at a cost to the colonial government. In 1868, penal transportation to Western Australia ceased, and the number of convicts in the colony gradually declined, down to 83 in the mid-1880s. Due to the great expense of sending these convicts back to Britain, the authorities there negotiated with the colonial government to relinquish jurisdiction over them, as well as the prison complex – demolition was considered too expensive. Early negotiations had broken down, but were restarted in August 1883. After one and a half years, a compromise was reached, and the transfer was finalised on 31 March 1886.

Once the prison came under the control of the colonial government, it was renamed Fremantle Prison. All prisoners in Perth Gaol were transferred to Fremantle, and from 1887 female prisoners were also imprisoned there, in their own separate section. The Western Australian gold rushes of the 1890s resulted in strong economic growth, and a massive increase in population: doubling from almost 50,000 in 1891 to more than 100,000 by 1895, and to 184,000 by 1901. This influx included desperate, dishonest people, from elsewhere in Australia and overseas, and Fremantle Prison was soon overcrowded.

The 1890s also saw a growing public unease with the treatment of prisoners. In September 1898 a royal commission was established by the Governor of Western Australia to investigate the colony's penal system. The commission heard evidence from almost 240 witnesses, including a range of prisoners. Three reports were made between December 1898 and June 1899, dealing with the most recognisable and prominent issues including classification, sentencing, punishments, and diet. In particular, they considered the philosophy of the prison system – the causes of crime, as well as the types of punishments and their justifications – and in light of this, the practicality of various reform proposals.

=== Early 20th century ===
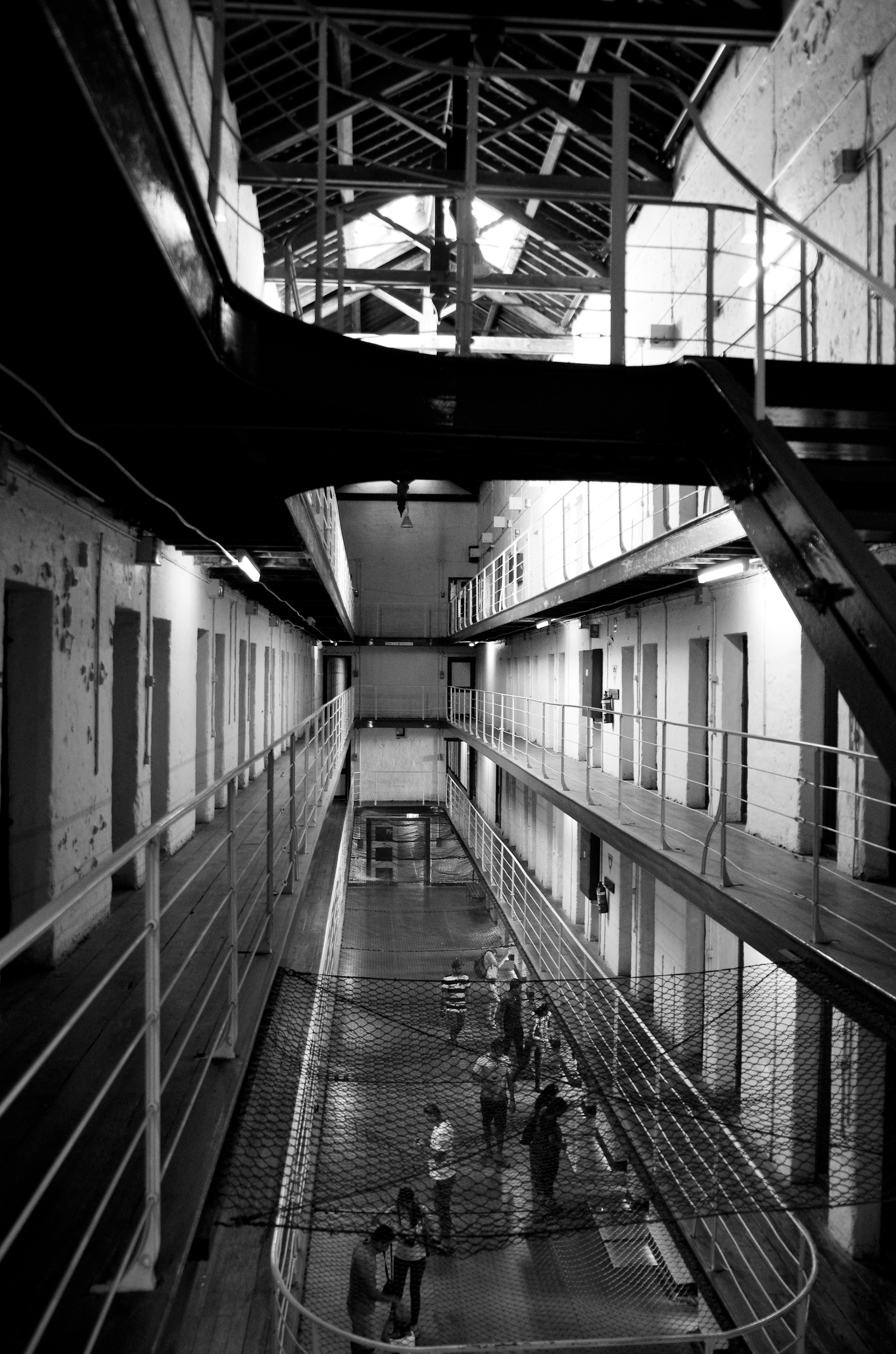
Three Division for "long sentenced and habitual prisoners"

Within a year of the enquiry, almost 100 cells had been enlarged by knocking down the inner wall between two cells, and a classification system was introduced. Internal walls were constructed in the main block, creating four separate divisions. Following the urgings of the prison Superintendent George and various official enquiries, new workshops were built to provide increased useful employment for prisoners. Five spaces were designed for tailors, bookbinders, shoemakers, mat makers and painters.

New regulations for prison officers were published in the Government Gazette of Western Australia in 1902, and a new Prisons Act 1903 was passed. While in theory the passing of the act should have resulted in significant prison reform, this did not eventuate. The legislation left much of the changes to executive regulation, at the discretion of the governor, and was described by the media as a feeble document.

New Division, completed in 1907 and occupied in 1908, resulted from the 1899 commissioners' report recommending a modified version of the separate system. The new division was similar in design to Henderson's 1850s structure, but was constructed in an L-shape, was only three stories tall, and had electric lighting. It also differed in its use from the main cell block. Unlike occupants of the earlier building, prisoners remained continuously in their cells except when exercising in separate yards, watched panopticon-style by a warder in a central tower.

In 1911 another royal commission investigation into Fremantle Prison recommended closing the facility. Its report was ignored by the state government, which was more concerned with building infrastructure such as roads and schools than the plight of its prisoners. However, there was a rapid change in prison policy, with the appointment of a superintendent, Hugh Hann, who had recent English and colonial experience, and the election of a Labor government with members interested in penal reform. One immediate result was the dismantling of the separate system at Fremantle Prison and the demolition of the separate exercise yards in 1912.

Fremantle Prison was partially used as a military prison during both world wars – for the detention of military personnel, as well as an internment centre. From 1940 until 1946, it was one of more than 50 military prisons across Australia holding a combined total of more than 12,000 enemy aliens and prisoners of war. Fremantle accommodated up to 400 military prisoners and up to 160 civilian prisoners by October 1945. The World War II takeover necessitated the commissioning of Barton's Mill Prison in 1942.

=== 20th century reform ===
Prison outstations were established as part of the reforms in the 20th century, and to reduce the overcrowding at Fremantle. Pardelup Prison Farm opened in 1927, near Mount Barker, while Barton's Mill, though planned to be a temporary measure, remained open as a prison after World War II. Significant reform to Western Australia's prison system did not begin until the 1960s, lagging behind those which occurred elsewhere in Australia and the world after World War II. Seven new prisons were opened between 1960 and 1971, and in 1970, female prisoners and staff were moved from Fremantle to the new Bandyup Women's Prison. New legislation regarding probation, parole, and convicted drunkards was also introduced, which provided alternatives to imprisonment. With these new arrangements, and more variety in prisons and prison types, a classification board was set up in 1963 to assess prisoners.

The appointment of Colin Campbell as comptroller general in 1966 fostered substantial changes within Fremantle Prison itself, with Campbell arguing,

prison is a place for rehabilitation and re-education [...] where people can retain their identity and, if necessary, create a new identity [...].

One of his first changes was to clear the classification committee's backlog of prisoners awaiting assessment. Campbell also established an officer training school, as well as an assessment centre to evaluate new prisoners. Work release and community service programs were also introduced, along with training programs, social workers and welfare officers. Within the midst of Campbell's reforms, the Prisons Department was renamed the Department of Corrections in 1971, restructured, and the position of comptroller general was replaced with director of the department.

In 1972 a Royal Commission was appointed to investigate mistreatment of and discrimination against Aboriginal prisoners. Its 1973 report found that there was not "any appreciable discrimination", however, racial stereotypes are present throughout the report, and the testimony of Aboriginal prisoners was considered unreliable. The report also made recommendations regarding various aspects of prison life, including additional, independent, trained welfare officers.

William Kidston succeeded Campbell in 1977, and oversaw a shift in policy from "paternalistic rehabilitation" of prisoners to merely providing opportunities for rehabilitation. A new Prisons Act was passed in 1981, which updated the 1903 Act with modern philosophies and practices. This act was, however, slanted towards prisoner management and safety, and the department was at the same time renamed the Prisons Department once more, to emphasise imprisonment as its primary responsibility. Ian Hill became Director of the Prisons Department in 1983, and reorganised the department several times, striving for increased efficiency. Whilst the changes of the 1980s were effective throughout most of Western Australia's prison system, the culture of Fremantle Prison was resistant to change. Growing prisoner discontent eventually culminated in the 1988 prison riot, investigated by an official enquiry later that year.

=== Closure and subsequent use ===
The state government made the decision to decommission Fremantle Prison in 1983, but it remained in operation until 30 November 1991. Prisoners were moved to a new metropolitan maximum security prison at Casuarina. There were divergent views in the community over the site's future, whether it should be preserved or redeveloped. The ultimate decision was for conservation of the prison, but allowing for the buildings to be adapted for reuse by the community.

The Fremantle Prison Trust was established in 1992 to advise the Minister for Works on the management of the site. Various new uses were found for different parts of the prison, including wedding services in the chapels, the Coastal Business Centre in New Division, and the Fremantle Children's Literature Centre in the hospital; the prison also became a tourist attraction. A private company, the Fremantle Prison Guardians, organised the tourist operation for ten years under contract, until the end of 2001; subsequently, the state government took control. A hostel providing short-stay accommodation in the Women's Prison opened in May 2015.

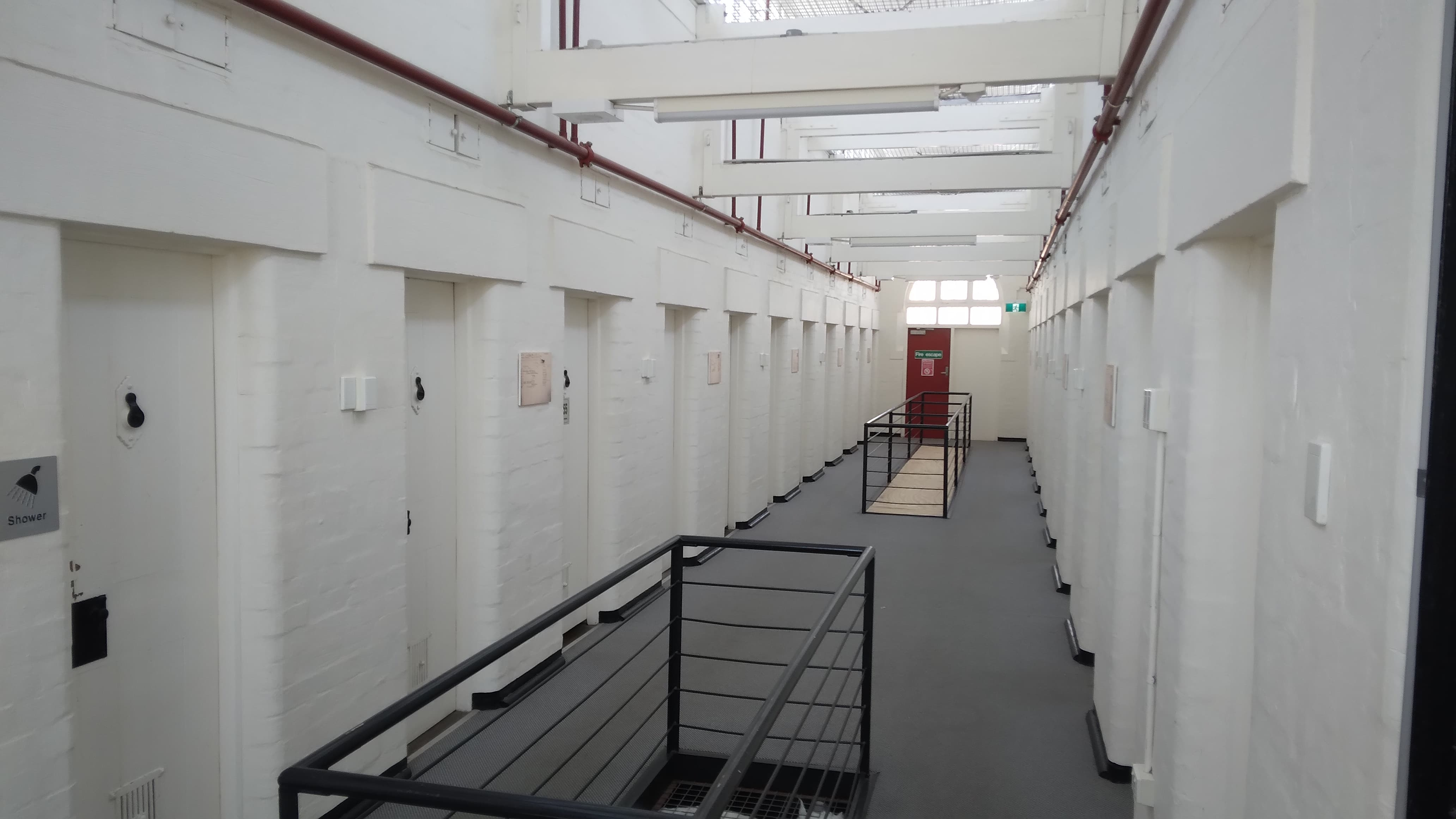
The interior of YHA Australia Fremantle Prison hostel in 2024

== Staff and prisoners ==
=== Administration ===
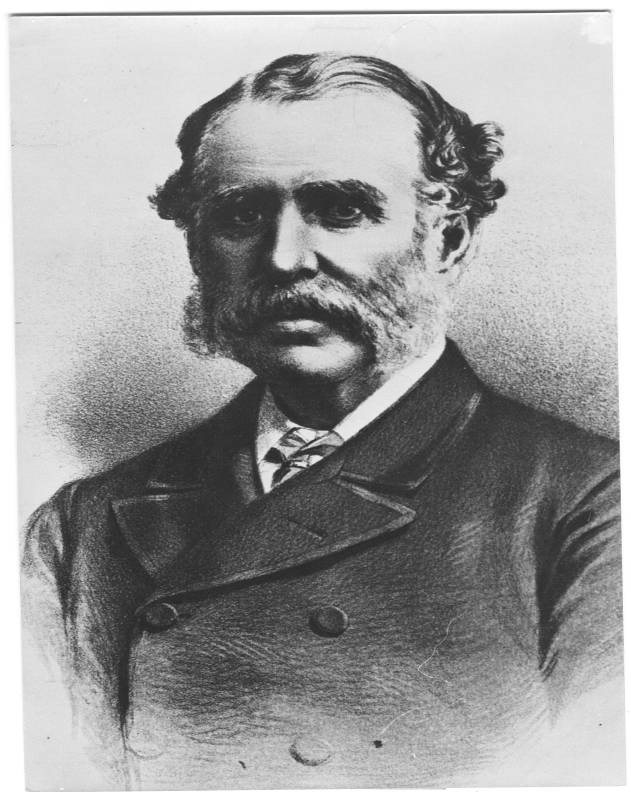
Comptroller General Edmund Henderson

Western Australia's first comptroller general of convicts, Edmund Henderson, administered the convict establishment for thirteen years. The primary responsibilities of the comptroller general were to "direct convict labour and be responsible for convict discipline". With the transfer of Fremantle Prison to the colonial government in 1886, the role of the comptroller was replaced by that of the sheriff, responsible for all of the prisons in the colony. The position of comptroller general was recreated, with duties split off from the sheriff's office, in early 1911. In 1971, the Prisons Department was renamed the Department of Corrections, restructured, and the position of comptroller general was replaced with director of the department. While the comptroller, sheriff, or director was responsible for the overall convict or prison system, largely centred around Fremantle Prison, the responsibility of the prison itself lay with the superintendent.

=== Officers ===
On convict ships, the convicts were guarded by pensioner guards, who were soldiers awarded pensions for their service in areas such as China, Crimea, and Afghanistan. Some remained in the military, but many opted to stay in the colony as settlers, having brought their wives and children with them. The pensioner guards were expected to help deal with any incidents of unrest at the prison.

Fremantle Prison's officers were known as warders until the early 20th century. They lived in specially built terrace houses within walking distance of the prison, and their lives were just as regimented as the prisoners. In the 1890s warders still had stringent living and working conditions, including ten- to twelve-hour working days. Due to a high turnover rate, many had little knowledge of either official policies or unofficial rules and traditions. The warder's role, previously unwritten, only became clearly defined in 1902. As well as guarding against escapes and enforcing discipline, they oversaw prisoner work and instructed inmates in trades. The warders were also supposed to be moral role models for prisoners, while maintaining a formal, distant, relationship.

The prison officer's role in the 20th century did not change much, with the job still entailing a boredom-inducing daily routine focused on security. Officer training became a priority under Campbell's administration, from the late 1960s. Training courses were set up for staff inductions and promotions, and seminars were started for senior officers. The most significant change in this period, however, was that prison officers achieved representation through the Western Australian Prison Officers' Union. The strength of the union was based on the ability to almost cripple the prison system through strike action, first taken in 1975.

=== Prisoners ===
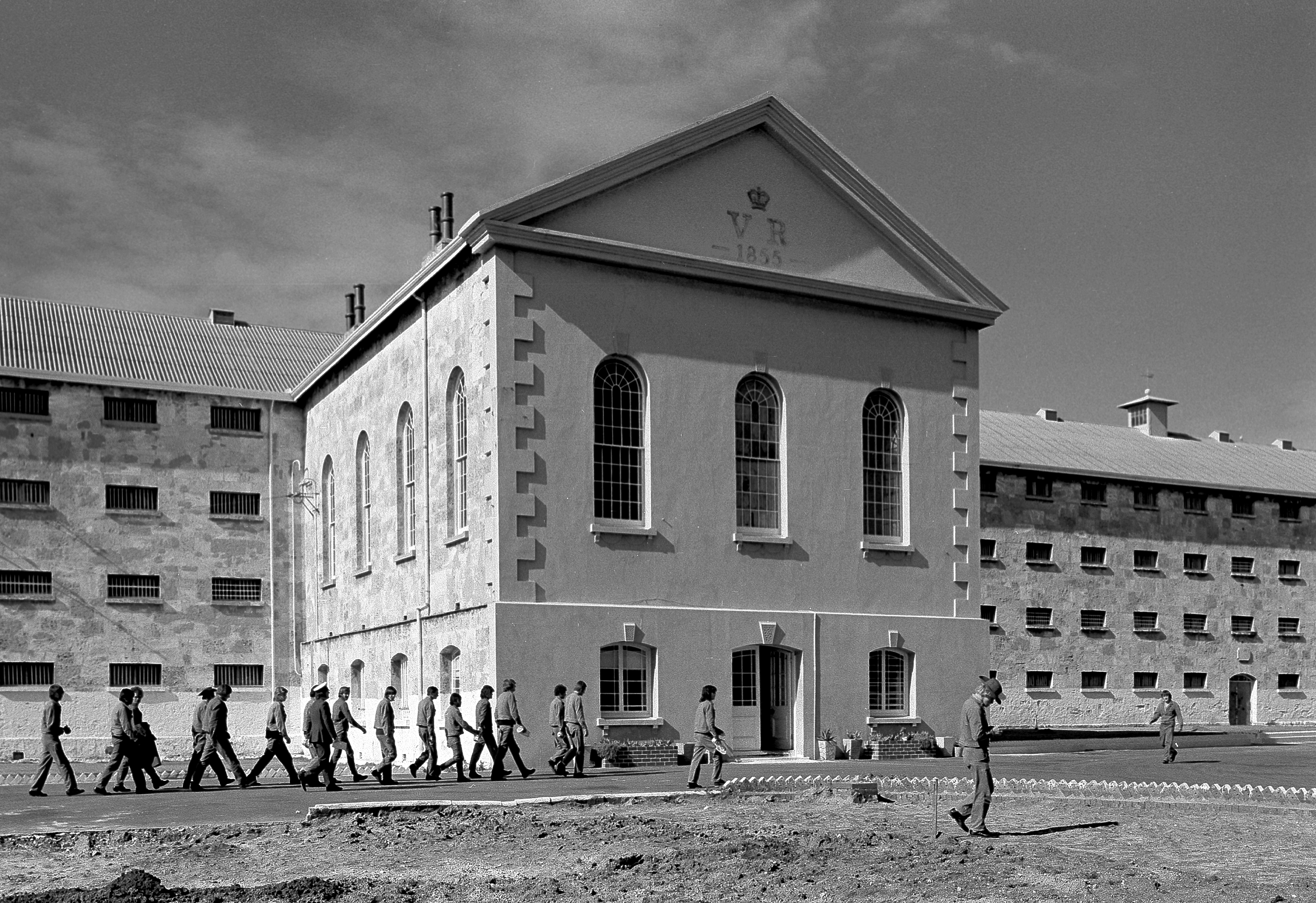
Prisoners in front of Main Cell Block, c. 1971

Convicts were introduced into Western Australia for three main purposes: inexpensive labour, additional labour, and an injection of British government spending into the local economy. During the initial years of transportation, convicts were generally young, from a rural background, and of good character, having only committed minor offences – potential future colonists, after their sentence had been served. By the 1860s the majority were older, more serious offenders from urban areas, including political prisoners considered to be "difficult and dangerous". Following the transfer of Fremantle Prison to local control in 1886, it became Western Australia's primary prison. In the late 1880s and 1890s the number of inmates swelled dramatically. This increase predominantly comprised prisoners serving shorter sentences of under three months. The number of inmates in 1897 was 379, and Inspector of Prisons James Roe viewed the prison as "inconveniently full".

Despite a large expansion of the prison system, the problem of overcrowding remained throughout the 20th century, as did Western Australia's high incarceration rate relative to the rest of Australia. The nature of prisoners changed, with three times the proportion of 16- to 19-year-olds in 1984 compared to 1898, and a growing over-representation of Aboriginal prisoners to nearly half the incarcerated population. (Note: Of the total prison population, the proportion of Aboriginal prisoners was 5.4% in 1910, 16% in 1968, more than 30% in 1977, and at least 45% in 1982.) Sentences also increased in length, such that in 1984 more than 80% of inmates were serving more than a year. In the 1970s and 1980s, there was an increasing number of people committed for violent crimes, but still a minority of the population. Both staff and prisoners, however, perceived a notable increase in violence during these years, coinciding with the rise of illegal drugs in prison, and of sentences for drug-related offences.

== Prison operation ==
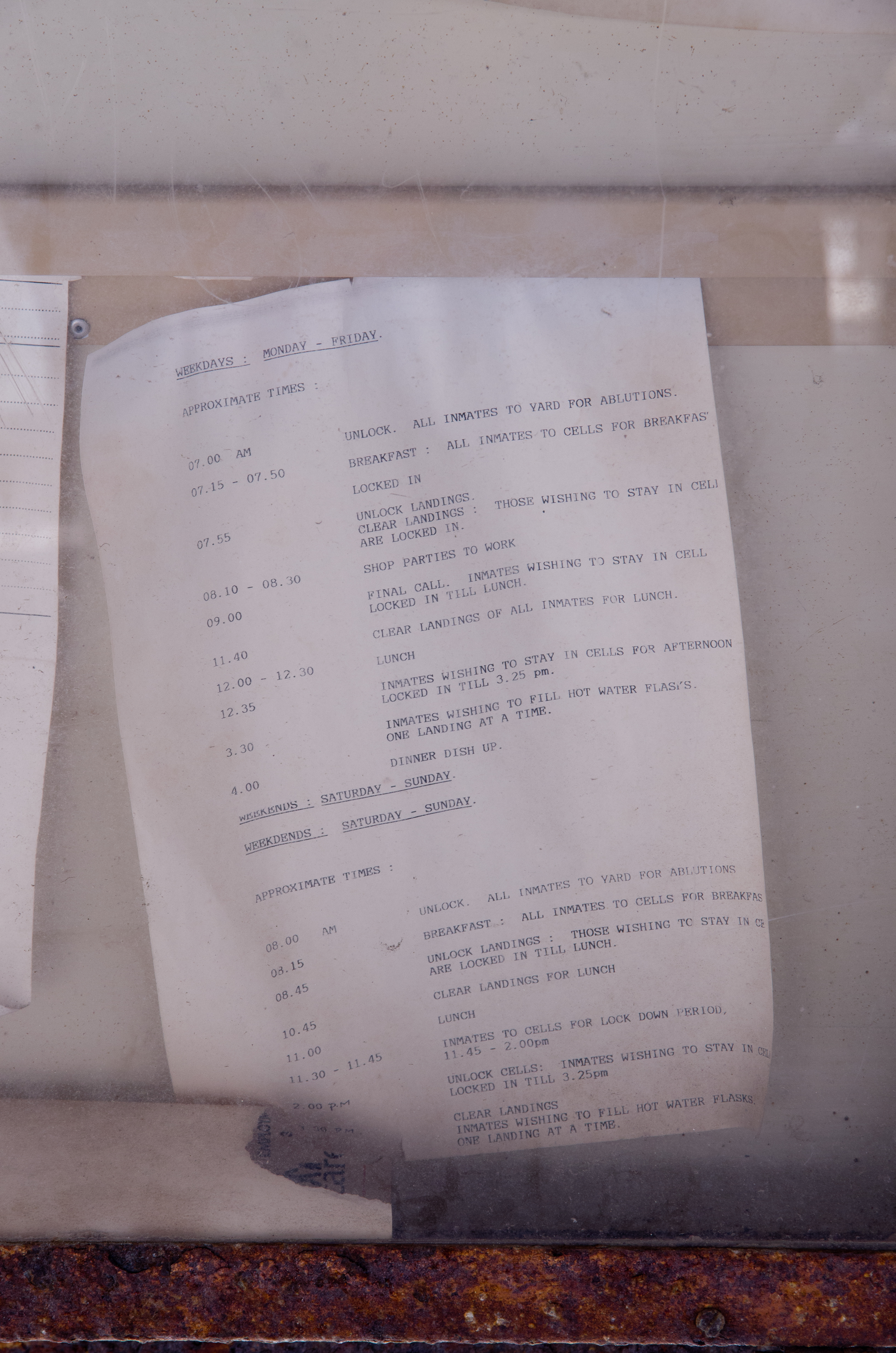
Daily routine in 1991

=== Routine ===
In the Convict Establishment of 1855, the day began with the wakeup bell at 4:30 am, and the officers and prisoners assembled in the parade ground at 5:25 am. Prisoners were sent to work before and after breakfast (in their cells), before assembling for muster at midday. This was followed by dinner in the exercise yard or the work site, and more work throughout the afternoon, until supper at 6:00 pm in the cells. Night officers took over at 7:15 pm. The transfer of the Convict Establishment to the colonially-run Fremantle Prison saw little change, and no new regulations.

A similar routine, but with fewer working hours, is described in the 1930s:

The following routine is observed by

those who go to Fremantle Jail:— 6.15 am., warning bell; prisoners rise and fold beds. 6.30. officers muster and unlock cells. 7.0. [sic] breakfast, which lasts 15 minutes, after which men assemble in their respective exercise yards. 7.55, parade for work. 11.45, parade for dinner, after which men are in yard until 1 pm, parade for work; 4.45 parade for tea. 5.30. muster; all cells, etc., locked for the night. 7.55. warning bell; prisoners to bed. 8.0, [sic] lights out except as provided for in reformatory regulations.

— Eddie Dunstan, The Daily News reporter

Not much had changed by the 1960s. The day began with a waking bell at 6:45 am. After a prisoner count, they moved into the yard until 7:30, when they collected breakfast and headed back to their cells. The 8:00 bell signalled a parade, and then the start of work, which lasted until 11:15. They ate a meal, locked in their cells until 12:20 pm, followed by some time in the yards. At 1:00 there was another parade, and another session of work which lasted to 4:15. Another meal was collected, and prisoners were locked away in their cells overnight. The lights stayed on until 9:30 pm. On the weekends the routine featured no work, and included a film played for the prisoners.

=== Diet ===
Prisoners ate meals in their cells, from the early years of the prison through to its closure in 1991. Bread from the prison bakehouse was included in every meal in the convict era. It was served with black tea for breakfast, and with either tea or cocoa in the evening. The main meal, called dinner, was in the middle of the day, and also featured soup, meat, and vegetables. By the 1890s food was still very limited in variety, with few vegetables. Porridge was given for breakfast, usually too fluid or overly solid, and the general standard of the prison's food was quite low, particularly in 1897 and 1898. However, the quality soon improved, as noted by the 1898 Royal Commission, which recommended decreasing rations to reduce costs.

In the 1960s, food preparation was overseen by a qualified chef, who also trained prisoners. The diet consisted of quality food, but "without trimmings". Breakfast was porridge, with a third of a pint of milk, a hot drink (tea, unless the prisoner bought (Note: Prisoners were paid for the work they did, and allowed to spend a small amount each year. The pay rate ranged from 50 cents to $1.60 per week in 1968, while the average weekly earnings in Western Australia for 1967–68 was $62.50.) coffee or cocoa), and either Vegemite, honey, or margarine, depending on the week. Lunch and dinner had more variation. Both meals consisted of a meat dish – corned beef, sausages, or mince pie – as well as mashed potato and cabbage, although there was occasionally a roast dinner. Meat, vegetables and bread were still a prominent part of the diet in 1991.

=== Labour ===
As well as being used to build the prison itself, convict labour, with convicts in chain gangs, was used for other public works in the Fremantle and surrounding Perth area, including The Causeway, Perth Town Hall and Stirling Highway. The work undertaken by a convict depended on their behaviour and demeanour. Upon arrival to Western Australia, convicts were kept within the prison for a period of observation. If found to have a reasonable disposition, the convict would be sent to work, in a gang under the control of a warder. Typical activities included "quarrying, filling swamps, burning lime, constructing public buildings, roads and jetties" around Fremantle and Perth.

After some time, they might be sent to work on road or other projects away from these main settlements. Continued good behaviour could see the convict granted a ticket-of-leave, allowing private employment in a specified district of the colony, and eventually a Conditional Pardon, allowing most freedoms, except for returning to England. A Certificate of Freedom would only be granted at the end of a sentence. Misbehaviour would result in demotion through these levels of work, including returning to convict status within the prison. Re-offenders and captured escapees, after corporal punishment and time in solitary confinement, would be placed on a chain gang undertaking hard labour, typically on roads near Fremantle.

Outside work, mostly on public infrastructure, continued beyond the convict era, but gradually declined due to discipline concerns, the rise of trade unions that saw such work as "a threat to free labour", and an increasing emphasis on work as rehabilitation rather than punishment. By 1911 outside work had all but ceased, but could not adequately be replaced by employment within the prison walls; a lack of suitable work plagued the prison throughout its lifetime. Work in the 19th century consisted of cooking, washing clothes, cleaning the prison, tailoring, bootmaking, and printing. However, demand exceeded the availability of such work – increasingly so in the later years of the 19th century – so prisoners were also given activities with no practical value other than keeping them occupied. These included breaking stones, operating a water pump, and oakum picking. Even with these extra activities, by 1899, 60 to 70 men were employed at the pump, each doing only a few minutes work per hour, and occupied the rest of the time with recreation such as draughts.

New workshops built in 1901 allowed prisoners to work in bootmaking and tailoring, and from 1904, printing. Only a small fraction of prisoners were allocated to the workshops – 35 out of an average of 279 prisoners in 1902. In 1908, there were still few men employed in the workshops, 20 in tailoring, 15 in bootmaking, and 12 in mat making, with only half of these working at a time, and little improvement by the 1911 Royal Commission. The 20th century saw little change in the work prisoners did. There were similar workshops, with the addition of metal work, and similar jobs around the prison complex, including in the laundry, in the kitchen, and cleaning the prison. In 1984, 90% of prisoners were reported to be employed, either full-time or part-time. The meaningfulness of the work was nominal, as work was viewed as "a management option rather than [for] production", (Note: According to the superintendent in 1983.) but security concerns and discipline restricted the rehabilitative value of the work, and limited much of the work to jobs non-existent outside of prison. (Note: Examples included "making paper bags, tailoring and heaping wood".)

=== Punishments ===
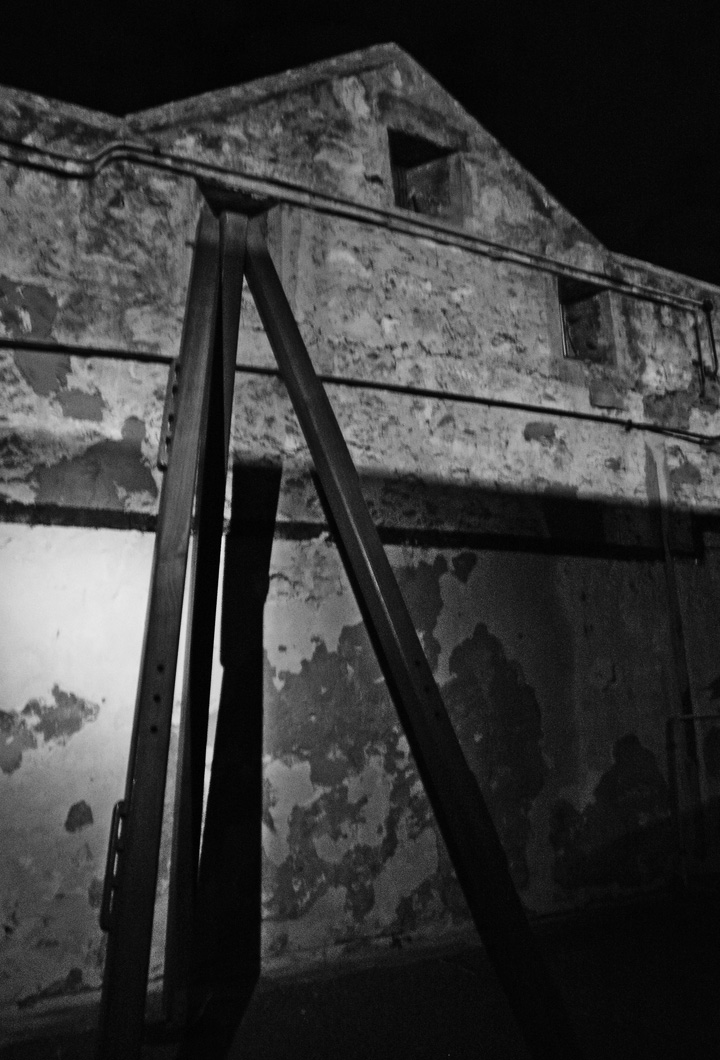
Post prisoners were tied to when flogged

In the convict era, particularly during Hampton's term as governor, misbehaving prisoners were punished with flogging, solitary confinement, and working in chain gangs at gunpoint. Particularly difficult prisoners were put to work hand pumping groundwater into the prison's reservoir. Known as cranking, it was especially despised by the prisoners. Staff disliked giving the lashings – in 1851, out of a total of 400 lashings ordered, 150 were remitted as the superintendent could not find anyone to undertake the task. The role was so disliked that inducements were offered, including extra pay or improved lodgings.

By the 1880s, punishments also included a restricted diet of bread and water (for a short time span), time in irons, and a lengthening of a prisoner's sentence by a visiting magistrate. The cat o' nine tails, which had been used since the early days of the prison, was abolished during the post-1911 Royal Commission reforms. Other reforms in this period saw the number of punishments inflicted decrease from 184 in 1913 to 57 in 1914, and 35 in 1915.

Flogging was discontinued in the 1940s, with the last incident occurring in 1943. From that decade, punishments were decided by the superintendent after hearing the case against a prisoner, or by a magistrate for grievous violations. Lesser transgressions could result in solitary confinement, or restriction from visitors, education, and concerts; serious offences were punishable by the cancellation of any remission earned and a bread-and-water diet, normally over a two-week period.

=== Executions ===
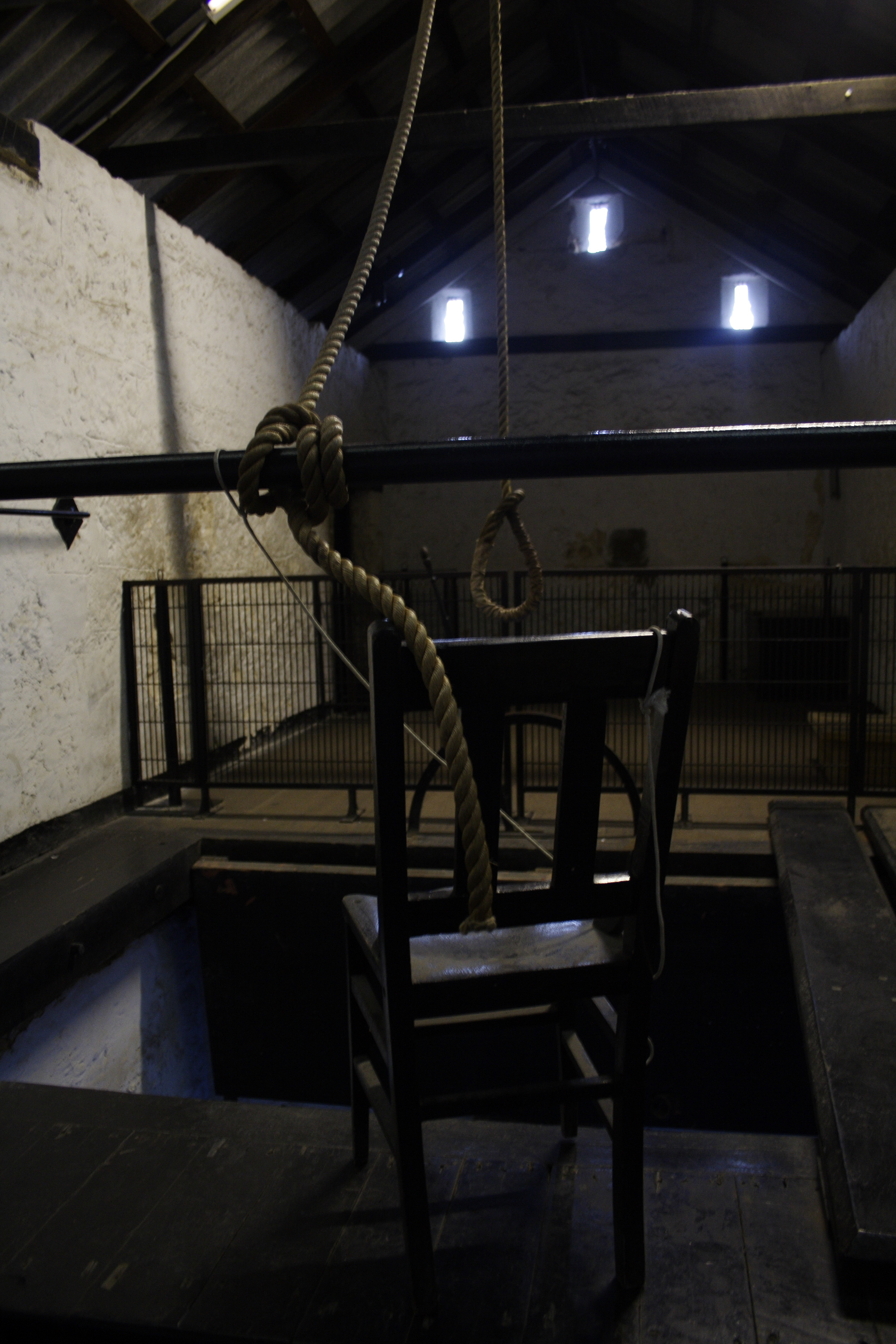
The gallows, last used in 1964

As soon as Fremantle Prison came under local control in 1886, a refractory block with gallows was planned. It was completed in 1888, and first used in 1889 to execute a convicted murderer, Jimmy Long, a Malayan. The gallows room was the only lawful place of execution in Western Australia between 1888 and 1984. (Note: Capital punishment was abolished in Western Australia in 1984.) At least 43 men (Note: Cyril Ayris claims 46 men were executed, while other sources claim 43 were executed.) and one woman were hanged in this period. Martha Rendell was the only woman to be hanged at the prison, in 1909. The last person to be hanged was serial killer Eric Edgar Cooke, executed in 1964.

The execution process followed a strict procedure. From the day of sentencing to death, prisoners were kept in a concrete-floored cell in New Division. They were vigilantly observed to prevent them escaping their sentence through suicide. With hangings taking place on Monday mornings, at 8:00 am, condemned prisoners were woken three hours earlier, and provided with a last meal, shower, and clean clothes. Afterwards, handcuffed, they were moved to a holding or "condemned cell" nearby the gallows, and allowed a couple of sips of brandy to calm their nerves. Shortly before 8:00 am, they were hooded, led up to the execution chamber, which could hold as many as eleven witnesses, stood over the trap door, had a noose put around their neck, and were hanged by dropping through the opening trap door. The time between leaving the cell and the execution itself was quite short, approximately 60 seconds. Following a medical examination, the deceased was removed for burial.

=== Escapes ===
There were a multitude of attempted escapes from Fremantle Prison. Prominent escapees included Moondyne Joe in 1867, John Boyle O'Reilly in 1869 and six other Fenians in 1876, and Brenden Abbott in 1989.

==== Moondyne Joe ====
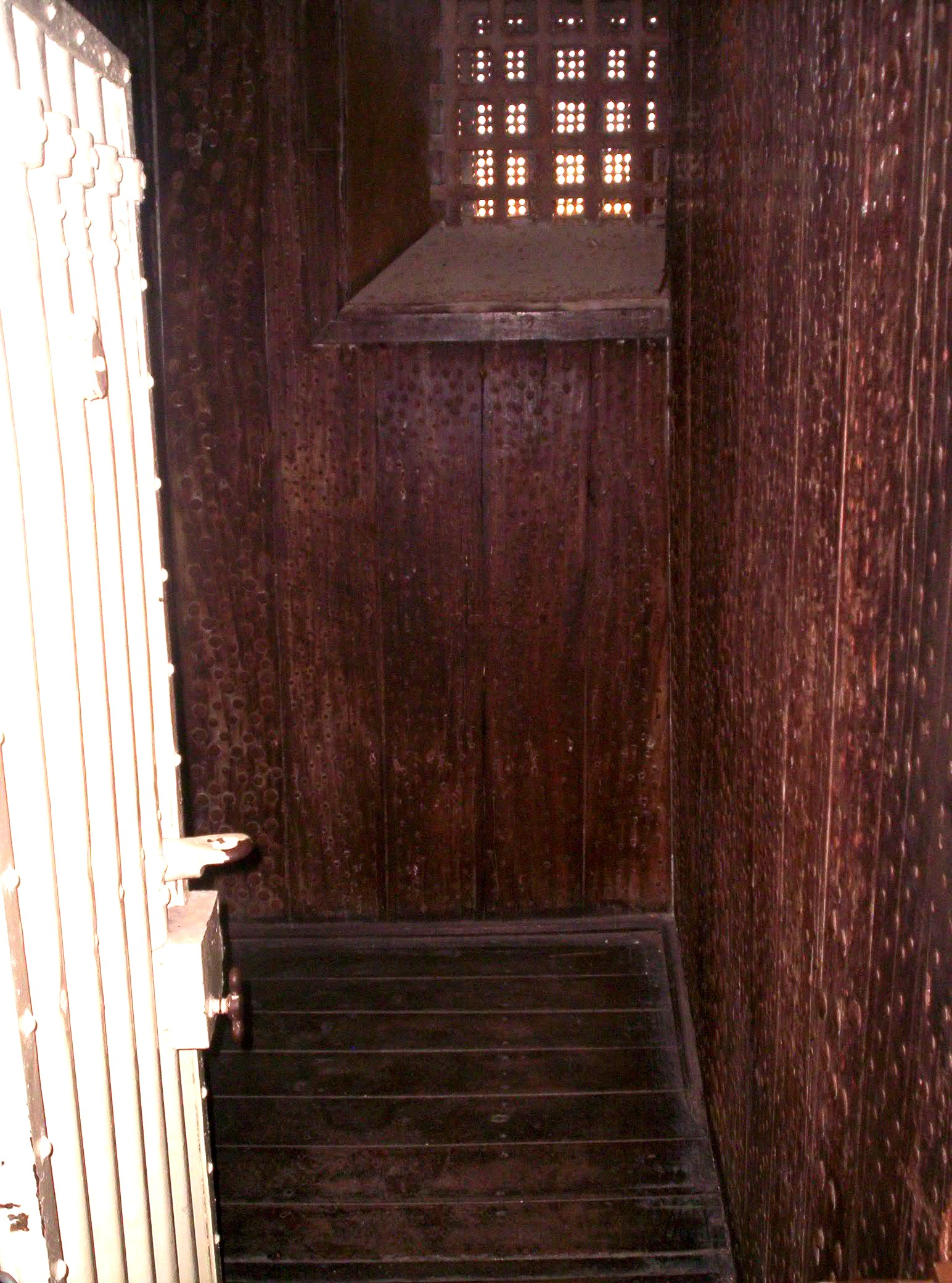
Moondyne Joe's "escape-proof" cell

Joseph Bolitho Johns, better known as Moondyne Joe, was Western Australia's best known bushranger. In July 1865, Johns was sentenced to ten years penal servitude for killing a steer. He and another prisoner absconded from a work party in early November, and were on the run for nearly a month, during which time Johns adopted the nickname Moondyne Joe. For absconding and for being in possession of a firearm, Moondyne Joe was sentenced to twelve months in irons, and transferred to Fremantle Prison. In July 1866 he received a further six months in irons for trying to cut the lock out of his door, but in August Moondyne Joe succeeded in escaping again. Moondyne Joe formulated a plan to escape the colony by travelling overland to South Australia, but was captured on 29 September about 300 kilometres (190 mi) north-east of Perth.

As punishment for escaping and for the robberies committed while on the run, Moondyne Joe received five years hard labour on top of his remaining sentence. Extraordinary measures were taken to ensure that he did not escape again. He was transferred to Fremantle Prison where a special escape-proof cell was made for him, built from stone, lined with jarrah sleepers and over 1000 nails. In early 1867 Moondyne Joe was set to work breaking stone, but rather than permit him to leave the prison, the acting comptroller-general ordered that the stone be brought in and dumped in a corner of the prison yard, where Moondyne Joe worked under the constant supervision of a warder.

Governor John Hampton was so confident of the arrangements, he was heard to say to Moondyne Joe: "If you get out again, I'll forgive you." However, the rock broken by Moondyne Joe was not removed regularly, and eventually a pile grew up until it obscured the guard's view of him below the waist. Partially hidden behind the pile of rocks, he occasionally swung his sledgehammer at the limestone wall of the prison. On 7 March 1867, Moondyne Joe escaped through a hole he had made in the prison wall. A few days before the second anniversary of his escape, Moondyne Joe was recaptured, returned to prison, and sentenced to an additional four years in irons. Eventually, Governor Frederick Weld heard of his predecessor Hampton's promise, and decided that further punishment would be unfair. Moondyne Joe was given a ticket of leave in May 1871.

==== The Fenians ====
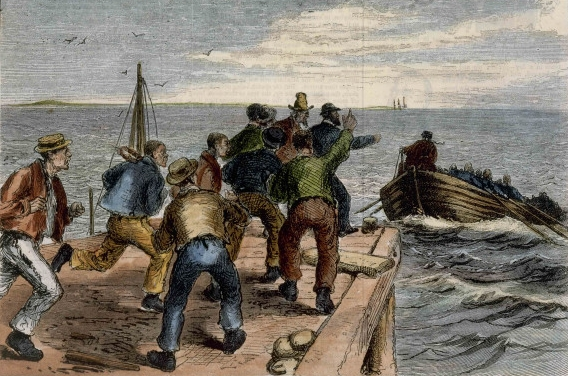
Fenians escape by whaleboat to Catalpa

From 1865 to 1867, British authorities rounded up supporters of the Irish Republican Brotherhood, or Fenians, an Irish independence movement, and transported sixty-two of them to Western Australia. In 1869, John Boyle O'Reilly escaped on the American whaling ship Gazelle and settled in Boston. Later that year, pardons were issued to many of the imprisoned Fenians, after which only eight militant Fenians remained in Western Australia's penal system.

The Fenians in America bought the whaling ship Catalpa, which on 29 April 1875 sailed from New Bedford, Massachusetts on a secret rescue mission. Coordinating with local Fenian agents, the escape was arranged for 17 April 1876, when most of the Convict Establishment garrison would be watching the Royal Perth Yacht Club regatta. Catalpa dropped anchor in international waters off Rockingham and dispatched a whaleboat to the shore. At 8.30 am, six Fenians who were working in work parties outside the prison walls absconded, and were met by carriages that raced 50 kilometres (31 mi) south to where the boat was waiting.

The whaleboat managed to rendezvous with Catalpa the following day, which then headed out to sea. They were chased by the steamship SS Georgette, which had been commandeered by the colonial governor. Though Georgette caught up with the whaler on 19 April, Catalpa's master claimed they were in international waters, and that an attack on Catalpa would be considered an act of war against the United States. Not wanting to cause a diplomatic incident, Georgette allowed Catalpa to flee.

==== Brenden Abbott ====
Brenden Abbott, "the Postcard Bandit", escaped from Fremantle Prison in 1989. He had been sentenced to twelve years in prison for "Australia's first 'drop in'-style bank robbery" at the Belmont branch of the Commonwealth Bank. While working in the prison's tailor shop, he was able to stitch together overalls resembling those worn by the guards. Abbott and two accomplices took the opportunity to escape, wearing the overalls, when left unsupervised in the workshop. They cut through a bar and got onto the roof. One accomplice fell and broke his leg, but Abbott and the other managed to jump over to the wall, and thus escape.

Abbott avoided capture until 1995, committing various robberies as he moved across Australia. He also escaped from a Queensland prison after two years and returned to Western Australia, allegedly robbing the Commonwealth Bank's Mirrabooka branch. Abbott was recaptured in Darwin, six months after his escape, and was sent to a Queensland maximum-security prison with a twenty year sentence to serve.

=== Riots ===
There have been various prisoner riots and other disturbances at Fremantle Prison over the years that it was operational. One of the earliest was in 1854, while major riots which occurred in 1968 and 1988 resulted in damage to the prison.

==== 1968 ====
A riot occurred on 4 June 1968, precipitated by the serving of allegedly contaminated food to prisoners the previous evening. Other factors that contributed were the rudimentary and deplorable state of sanitation and personal cleanliness facilities, tougher sentencing introduced with the Parole Act of 1964, and the overcrowding. When the work bell was rung at 1 pm, prisoners rebelled; refusing to go back to work, they assembled themselves in the exercise yards. The prison superintendent Mr Thorpe negotiated with two deputations of prisoners. As well as better food, they demanded single cells and the dismissal of specific wardens.

After approximately three hours, the negotiations broke down, and that night's evening meal was withheld. That caused the prisoners to riot, breaking fittings; during the commotion, three prison officers, three prisoners, and a detective sustained injuries. Additional police and wardens arrived at 5 pm, but took seven hours to subdue the prisoners, with the last of them locked in their cells just after midnight. The extent of the damage was in the order of A$200 to A$300 (about A$2,800 to A$4,200 in 2022). To relieve the overcrowding and reduce prisoner agitation, around 60 men who had not taken part in the riot were transferred to prisons at Albany, Geraldton, Karnet, and Barton's Mill. However, other improvements could not be undertaken without funding from the state government, which did not consider prison reform a priority.

==== 1988 ====
On 4 January 1988, despite the 42 °C (108 °F) heat, officers decided prisoners should remain outside in the exercise yards in the afternoon. As division 3 prisoners were let inside at around 4 pm, a voice exclaimed "Let's take 'em", and simultaneously, guards were splashed with boiling water, usually used for making tea. A horde of prisoners stormed the cellblock, attacking the guards with whatever makeshift weapons they could find. This resulted in pandemonium; prisoners rushed along landings, overpowering officers and taking them hostage, while at the same time, other prisoners darted between cells, starting fires. The prisoners withdrew to the exercise yard, taking six hostages, as flames quickly overran the building, spread into the rafters, and caused the roof to collapse.

Police negotiators communicated with the ring leaders, and by nightfall only five hostages remained. Meanwhile, the fire brigade had trouble bringing the inferno in the main cell block under control, as the prison's gate was too narrow for their trucks, and prisoners impeded their endeavours by throwing debris at them. The prisoners' leaders made three demands: a meeting with Attorney General Joe Berinson, access to the media, and a guarantee of no retribution afterwards. The next morning, after 19 hours, the hostages were released, even though only the third demand had been met. Prisoners did, however, have an opportunity to communicate with the press during the siege, as the riot was a live media event with television helicopters filming from overhead.

Although there were no deaths, the fire caused A$1.8 million, equivalent to A$4.6 million in 2022, of damage, and officers were injured. In the aftermath of the riot, there was extensive media attention on Fremantle Prison, and investigative journalists uncovered prior warnings to the prison authorities of the risk of such an event. The government hastily initiated an enquiry into the incident, and a report was completed within six weeks. A trial involving thirty-three prisoners charged over the riot was also held, the largest in the state's history, which resulted in lengthened sentences for the prisoners.

== Conservation ==
=== Heritage listing ===
Fremantle Prison was listed in the Western Australian Register of Historic Places as an interim entry on 10 January 1992 and included as a permanent entry on 30 June 1995. Described as the best preserved convict-built prison in the country, it became the first building in Western Australia to be listed on the Australian National Heritage List, in 2005. The Australian Federal Heritage Minister, Senator Ian Campbell, stated that it would be included in a nomination of eleven convict areas to become World Heritage Sites. Five years later, these locations were inscribed on the UNESCO World Heritage List in 2010 as the Australian Convict Sites.

The process of obtaining World Heritage listing focused historical interpretation and conservation efforts on the prison's convict era. This came at the expense of its more recent history, included use as an internment centre during World War II, and the imprisonment of Aboriginal prisoners. The prioritisation, evident from the first conservation plans from before the prison closed, is reflected in the branding of the tourist experience as "Fremantle Prison – the Convict Establishment", and through restorations that, while necessary to prevent damage and deterioration, strip away the site's recent history.

=== Restoration ===
Various parts of Fremantle Prison have had restoration works undertaken since the 1990s; a total of A$800,000 (equivalent to A$1.5 million in 2022) was spent between 1996/97 and 1998/99 on works which included restoring the facade of the Anglican chapel. In 2005, work was undertaken on the restoration of the prison gatehouse area. Non-original rendering was removed and the original stonework was revealed. Work was also completed on the tunnels during 2005/06, and the main cell block was restored with an eighteen month, A$1.9 million (equivalent to A$2.8 million in 2022) project in 2006 and 2007. The gallows room was restored in 2013 to conditions at the time of the last execution, in 1964.

== Tourism ==
External audio
- Fremantle Prison Tour from ABC Radio National's Law Report (transcript)

Fremantle Prison receives international and domestic tourists, as well as ex-prisoners, former prison officers, and their descendants. Tourist numbers increased each year from 2001/02 to 2009/10, up from almost 105,000 to nearly 180,000 over that period. As of 2018, the prison has won, been a finalist in, or received other commendation at tourism or heritage awards each year since 2006. (Note: Fremantle prison won, was a finalist, or received commendation at awards in 2006, 2007, 2008, 2009, 2010, 2011, 2012, 2013, 2014, 2015, 2016, 2017, and 2018.) While the tourist experience is based on authenticity and heritage values, some details are concealed or de-emphasised, such as prison tattooing, riots, and graffiti portraying revenge, sexuality, or brutality.

Attractions include guided tours, a visitors' centre with searchable convict database, art gallery, café, gift shop, and tourist accommodation. Educational activities are regularly held for school children, as are exhibitions and re-enactments of historical events. Functions such as theme parties and dinners are held in the prison, with re-enactments serving as entertainment. Tours of the prison show aspects of prison life and recount successful and attempted escapes. Sections of the tunnels are accessible, and night tours focus on the prison's reputation for being haunted. (Note: There were no reports of ghosts while Fremantle Prison was operational, but it has since developed a reputation as one of Perth's haunted locations.)

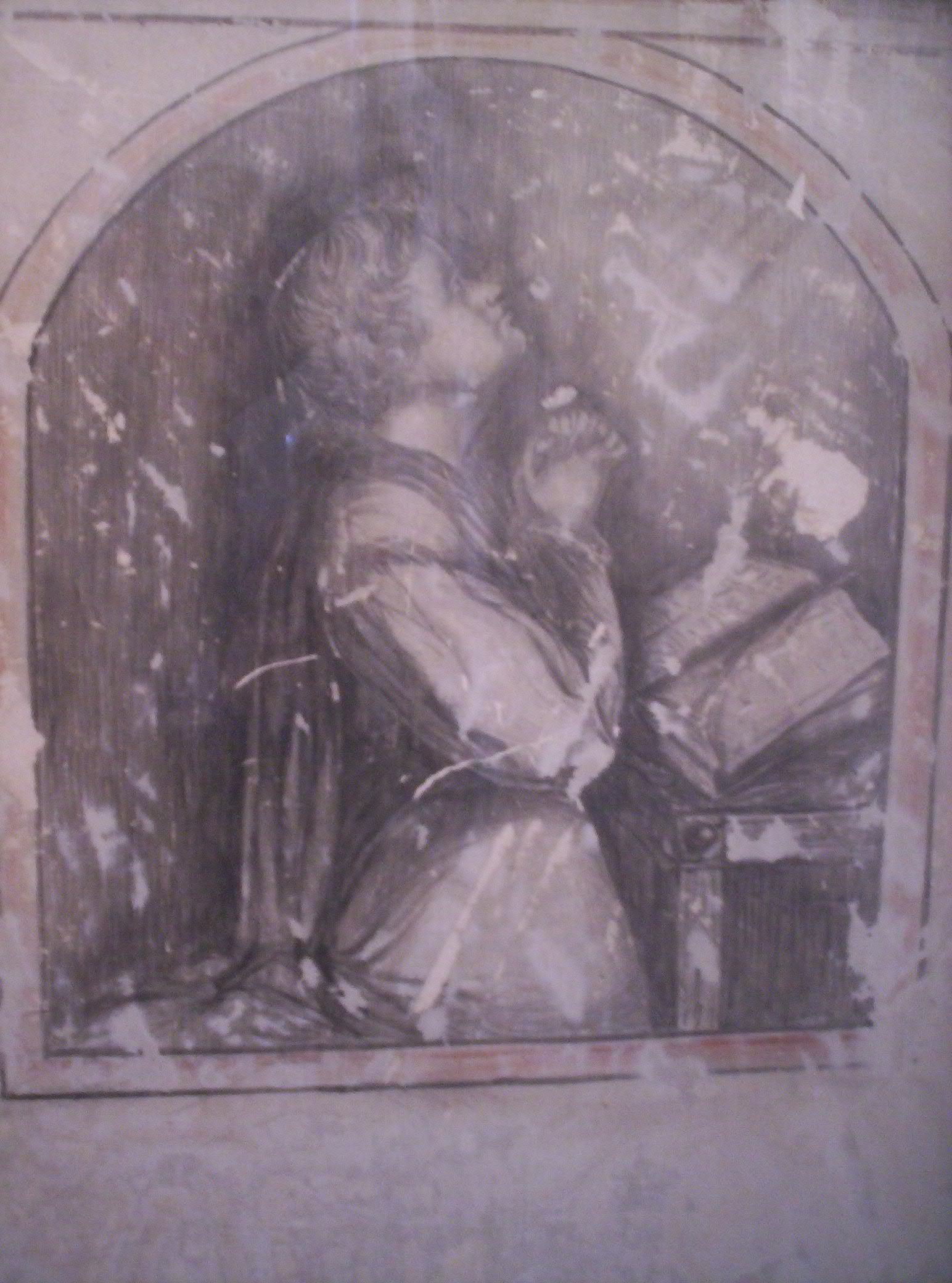
Drawing found in James Walsh's cell

The Fremantle Prison Collection contains around 15,000 items associated with the prison's site, history, or the experiences of its workers and prisoners. It is also involved in preserving oral histories, with interview transcripts stored at Fremantle Prison and recordings archived in the Battye Library Oral History Collection. Recollections have been recorded since 1989, and include the experiences of authorities, staff, volunteer visitors, and prisoners. The Fremantle Prison records and collections, including archaeological, provide a substantial resource for researchers.

The Prison Gallery showcases and offers for sale the artworks of current and ex-prisoners of Western Australia. It also hosts other exhibits related to the history of the prison, including historical artefacts. Many cells and areas of the prison depict prisoners' artwork, including that of the 19th-century forger James Walsh, whose artwork was hidden beneath layers of white-wash for decades. Painting or drawing on walls was originally forbidden, though graffiti, which could be viewed as art or vandalism, occurred throughout the prison's operational years. This rule was relaxed in special cases – including, from 1976, long-term prisoners within their own cells – but only for work considered art and not graffiti. Art, or art therapy, was not officially permitted until the 1980s; graffiti was never formally permitted, but in the prison's last six months, with closure imminent, the rule was not enforced. (Note: An archaeological study found almost 800 graffiti images.)

A more contemporary prison artist was Dennis (NOZ) Nozworthy, who stated that he found art on death row, in 1982. (Note: Capital punishment was abolished in 1984; Nozworthy spent 22 years in prison.) Some of his work currently is held in the collections of Curtin University, Perth Central TAFE, and the WA Government, Department of Justice. Other cells contain Aboriginal artwork, many by unknown artists. The Walmajarri artist Jimmy Pike started painting in Fremantle prison, having received tuition from Steve Culley and David Wroth.

== See also ==
- List of reportedly haunted locations
- List of convict ship voyages to Western Australia
- Parkhurst apprentices
- Tourism in Perth
- Notable prisoners:
  - David Birnie – a serial killer
  - John Button – served 5 years after being wrongfully convicted of manslaughter
  - Bon Scott – the former lead singer of rock band AC/DC spent time in the Assessment Centre before being transferred to Riverbank Juvenile Institution
  - James Wilson – an Irish Nationalist
