= David and Catherine Birnie =

Australian couple convicted of four murders

Coordinates: 32.047414°S 115.812102°E

David Birnie
- Born: David John Birnie; 16 February 1951
- Died: 7 October 2005 (aged 54); Casuarina Prison in Casuarina, Western Australia, Australia
- Cause of death: Suicide by hanging
- Spouse(s): Kerrie Birnie (1972–1982); Catherine Birnie (1985–2005; his death)
- Children: 1
- Penalty: Four terms of life imprisonment

Details
- Victims: 4+
- Span of crimes: 6 October – 9 November 1986
- Country: Australia
- State: Western Australia
- Date apprehended: November 1986; 40 years ago

Catherine Birnie
- Born: Catherine Margaret Harrison; 23 May 1951 (age 75)
- Spouse(s): Donald McLaughlin (1971–1985; he died in 1999); David Birnie
- Children: 7 (1 deceased)
- Penalty: Four terms of life imprisonment

Details
- Victims: 4+
- Country: Australia
- State: Western Australia
- Date apprehended: November 1986; 40 years ago

David John Birnie (16 February 1951 – 7 October 2005) and Catherine Margaret Birnie (née Harrison; born 23 May 1951) were an Australian couple from Perth who murdered four women at their home in 1986, also attempting to murder a fifth. These crimes were referred to in the press as the Moorhouse murders, after the Birnies' address at 3 Moorhouse Street in Willagee, a suburb of Perth.

== David John Birnie ==
David Birnie was the oldest of five children and grew up in Wattle Grove, a semi-rural suburb of Perth. School friends and church acquaintances remember Birnie's family as having been dysfunctional and subject to frequent rumours involving alcoholism, promiscuity and incest. The family never had regular meals together, and Birnie's parents did not cook meals for their children.

In the early 1960s, Birnie's parents decided to move the family to another Perth suburb, where he eventually met Catherine Harrison through mutual friends. At age 15 he left school to become an apprentice jockey for Eric Parnham at the nearby Ascot Racecourse. During his time there, Birnie physically abused the horses and developed a habit of exhibitionism. One night, Birnie, wearing only stockings over his head, broke into the room of an elderly lady where he was boarding and attempted to rape her.

By the time he was an adolescent, Birnie had been in and out of prison for several misdemeanors and felonies. As an adult he became addicted to sex and pornography, and was a paraphiliac. In his early twenties, Birnie married his first wife and had a daughter, Tanya, who was aged 10 at the time of his arrest. Tanya, who has changed her surname since Birnie's capture, has never married and had no children, stating, "I don't wanna spawn another David Birnie."

In late 1986, at the time of the murders, Birnie was employed at a car wrecker's shop in the Perth suburb of Willagee.

== Catherine Margaret Birnie ==
Catherine Birnie was born Catherine Margaret Harrison on 23 May 1951. She was two years old when her mother Doreen died giving birth to her brother, who himself died two days later. Unable to raise Catherine, her father Harold sent the girl to live with her maternal grandparents. At age 10, a custody dispute resulted in Harold regaining sole custody of Catherine.

Catherine met David at age twelve and began a romantic relationship with him two years later. Her father pleaded with her on several occasions to leave David as her involvement with him led to her getting into trouble with police, resulting in her being sent to a youth prison in adolescence. Encouraged by a parole officer, Catherine began working for the McLaughlin family as a housekeeper. She married Donald McLaughlin on her 21st birthday and had seven children. Their firstborn, a son, was struck and killed by a car in infancy.

In 1985, Catherine left her family and resumed her relationship with David. The couple were never legally married, but Catherine changed her surname by deed poll.

== Crimes ==
Over a period of five weeks, the Birnies abducted five women and girls aged between 15 and 31. All the victims except for one were raped at the couple's residence at 3 Moorhouse Street and subsequently murdered. The sole exception was their final victim, who escaped the day after her abduction and led police back to the Birnie house, thus ending their crime spree.

== Victims ==
=== Mary Neilson ===
Twenty-two-year-old Mary Neilson, a psychology student at the University of Western Australia and part-time delicatessen worker, met David at the car wrecker's shop where he worked. David offered to sell Neilson some cheap tyres for her car and subsequently gave her his phone number. Upon visiting Moorhouse Street on 6 October 1986, Neilson was gagged, chained to a bed, and raped by David while Catherine observed. She was then taken to Gleneagle, near Albany Highway in Bedfordale, where she was raped again and strangled with a nylon cord. David then stabbed her and afterwards Catherine joined him in burying Neilson in a shallow grave. She would have received her degree for psychology from the university one year after her murder.

=== Susannah Candy ===
Two weeks later, Susannah Candy, a 15-year-old high school student from Nedlands, was abducted while hitchhiking along the Stirling Highway in Claremont. Once she entered the Birnies' car, Candy was bound and held at knifepoint. The Birnies forced her to send letters to her family to assure them that she was all right, then took Candy to Moorhouse Street and subjected her to the same ordeal as Neilson. Afterward, after an abortive attempt to strangle the girl with the nylon cord, the Birnies forced sleeping pills down her throat. Once they took effect, David put the cord around her neck and told Catherine to prove her undying love for him by murdering the girl herself. Catherine complied and killed Candy while David watched. Candy was buried close to Neilson's gravesite in Gleneagle.

When asked later why she murdered Candy, Catherine said:

because I wanted to see how strong I was within my inner self. I didn't feel a thing. It was like I expected. I was prepared to follow him to the end of the earth and do anything to see that his desires were satisfied. She was a female. Females hurt and destroy males.

=== Noelene Patterson ===
On 1 November, 31-year-old Noelene Patterson ran out of fuel on Canning Highway while on her way home from her job as bar manager at the Nedlands Golf Club. Patterson was picked up by the Birnies and, similar to the first two victims, was forcibly taken to Moorhouse Street and repeatedly raped by David. The Birnies originally decided to murder Patterson that same night, but David kept her prisoner in the house for three days amid an apparent emotional attachment to the woman. Catherine quickly became jealous and made an ultimatum: David would have to kill Patterson, or Catherine would kill her herself. He immediately forced an overdose of sleeping pills down Patterson's throat and strangled her while she slept. They took her body to Gleneagle but buried it away from the others. Catherine reportedly got great pleasure from throwing sand on Patterson's face.

=== Denise Brown ===
On 5 November, the Birnies abducted 21-year-old Denise Brown from a bus stop on Stirling Highway. In the same fashion as the earlier victims, Brown was abducted at knifepoint and assaulted at Moorhouse Street. The following afternoon, Brown was taken to the Wanneroo pine plantation where, in the seclusion of the forest, David raped her in the couple's car while they waited for darkness. After dragging Brown from the car, David raped her again and stabbed her in the neck. Convinced that the woman was dead, they dug a shallow grave and laid her body in it, but Brown sat up in the grave. David then grabbed an axe, struck her twice in the head and buried her again.

=== Kate Moir ===
On 9 November, 17-year-old Kate Moir was abducted at knifepoint after accepting a ride from the Birnies. David held a knife to her throat and forced her to ring her mother. Moir told her mother that she had too much to drink and was staying at a friend's house, hoping her mother would realise it was a ruse and call the friend, knowing she was not a drinker. Moir later stated that she asked them if they intended to kill or rape her, and was informed, "We'll only rape you if you're good". She was forced to dance for the Birnies, and slept in their bed while handcuffed to David.

After David went to work on the day following her capture, Catherine went to the front door to carry out a drug deal and forgot to chain Moir to the bed. Moir broke the lock of a nearby window and climbed through but hit her head on concrete. After knocking on various neighbours' doors, she jumped a gate and was attacked by David's dog. She ran into a nearby vacuum cleaner shop, informing the owner that she had been raped. Moir detailed her ordeal to police; while some of the officers were initially skeptical of her story, 22-year-old Constable Laura Hancock believed her from the outset due to the amount of detail she provided, including the Birnies' address and telephone number.

The Birnies had given themselves aliases, but Moir had read David's name on a medicine bottle. Moir stated the couple had watched the film Rocky on video, and described a drawing she had concealed in the house as proof of her presence. Subsequently, police found the drawing and the video cassette copy of Rocky in the Birnies' VCR. The Birnies were arrested, and during their interviews they gave conflicting information; Catherine denied ever meeting Moir, while David insisted Moir had come to their house voluntarily to engage in consensual sex. Detective Sergeant Vince Katich convinced David to confess and reveal where the previous victims had been buried.

=== Other possible victims ===
There is speculation that the Birnies were responsible for the disappearance of Cheryl Renwick in May 1986 and Barbara Western in June 1986. It has also been suggested that David was responsible for the disappearance of Lisa Marie Mott in 1980; however, his first wife accounted for his whereabouts on the day Mott disappeared. This crime remains unsolved.

== Trial and sentencing ==
When sent to trial, David pleaded guilty to four counts of murder and one count each of abduction and rape. He was sentenced to four terms of life imprisonment. After being found sane enough to stand trial, Catherine was also sentenced to four terms of life imprisonment by the Supreme Court of Western Australia; under law at the time, both were required to serve twenty years before being eligible for parole.

== Imprisonment ==
Initially, David was held at the maximum-security Fremantle Prison, but he was soon moved to solitary confinement to keep him from coming to harm from other prisoners. Three of the original death row cells were converted for him and he stayed there until the prison was closed in 1991. The cell can occasionally be viewed on the True Crime Tour held daily at Fremantle Prison. While incarcerated, the Birnies exchanged more than 2,600 letters but were not allowed any other form of contact.

David was found dead in his cell at Casuarina Prison on 7 October 2005 at 4:30 am local time. He was 54 years old. An inquest found that he had hanged himself from an air vent using a length of cord. Various factors led to his suicide; a failure to provide him with his antidepressants had exacerbated his depression, his computer had been confiscated and he was suspected of sexually assaulting another prisoner. He was described by a former prison officer as a 'model prisoner' who looked after injured animals. Catherine was not allowed to attend his funeral.

Catherine is imprisoned at Bandyup Women's Prison. Since being incarcerated she has worked as a prison librarian and appeared in a prison production of Nunsense. In 2007, her parole application was rejected and the then Attorney-General of Western Australia, Jim McGinty, said that her release was unlikely while he remained in office.

Catherine's case was to be reviewed again in January 2010; however, on 14 March 2009, new Western Australian Attorney-General Christian Porter, following requests from the victims' families, determined she would stay in jail for life. This decision makes her the third Australian woman (after Katherine Knight and Patricia Byers) to have her papers marked "never to be released". Her appeal of this decision was turned down in March 2010 by Porter. Her fourth bid for parole was declined in 2016. That same year, surviving victim Kate Moir began a campaign to end Western Australian laws that automatically put convicts up for parole every three years. Moir has stated Birnie has never even applied for parole.

In 2017, Catherine's youngest son, under the alias Peter, called for her execution, stating that his relation to her has resulted in him being assaulted on multiple occasions. He also supports Moir's campaign to end automatic parole candidacy.

== News media ==
The case was included in Season 1, Episode 6 ("The Moorhouse Horrors") of Crime Investigation Australia, first aired 2005.

The case formed an episode of Australian Families of Crime. Nine Network Australia (2010).

The case was covered by Casefile True Crime Podcast on 27 August 2016.

On 9 November 2017, the case was discussed by Georgia Hardstark in an episode of the podcast My Favorite Murder.

The case was detailed on episode 75 of the True Crime All the Time podcast on 22 April 2018.

The 2016 Australian film Hounds of Love is based on several true murders, but most closely resembles the Moorhouse Murders.

The case was covered by Morbid: A True Crime Podcast on May 8, 2021, as a part of a two-episode series, titled "Episode 230: Catherine & David Birnie Part 1" and "Episode 231: Catherine & David Birnie Part 2".

== See also ==
- List of serial killers by country
