= Australian Families of Crime =

- Genre: Crime documentary
- Presented by: Vince Colosimo
- Country of origin: Australia
- Original language: English
- No. of seasons: 1
- No. of episodes: 8+

Production
- Running time: 60 minutes (including commercials)

Original release
- Network: Nine Network
- Release: 19 April 2010

Australian Families of Crime is an Australian documentary television series that was originally aired on Foxtel and hosted by Steve Liebmann. The same episodes were then shown on the free-to-air Nine Network but hosted by actor Vince Colosimo to capitalise on the Underbelly crime series at the time, also airing on the Nine Network and starring Colosimo. Families of Crime gives an insight into some of Australia's most infamous "crime families" who wielded power, fear and destruction through the community.

Through interviews with family members, associates, victims and police investigators, their stories expose how some of Australia's worst criminal families operated their web of violence and corruption.

== Episodes ==
Season 1

- Episode 1 – Carl Williams: Baby Faced Killer
- Episode 2 – Ivan Milat: Backpacker Bloodshed
- Episode 3 – Abe Saffron: King of the Cross
- Episode 4 – Mother of Evil: Pettingill
- Episode 5 – Dockers & Death: Les and Brian Kane
- Episode 6 – Mr. Bigs: Lenny McPherson and George Freeman
- Episode 7 – The Killer Couple: David and Catherine Birnie
- Episode 8 – Blood Brothers: The Anita Cobby Killers
