= Fremantle Prison riot =

Prison riot in Australia

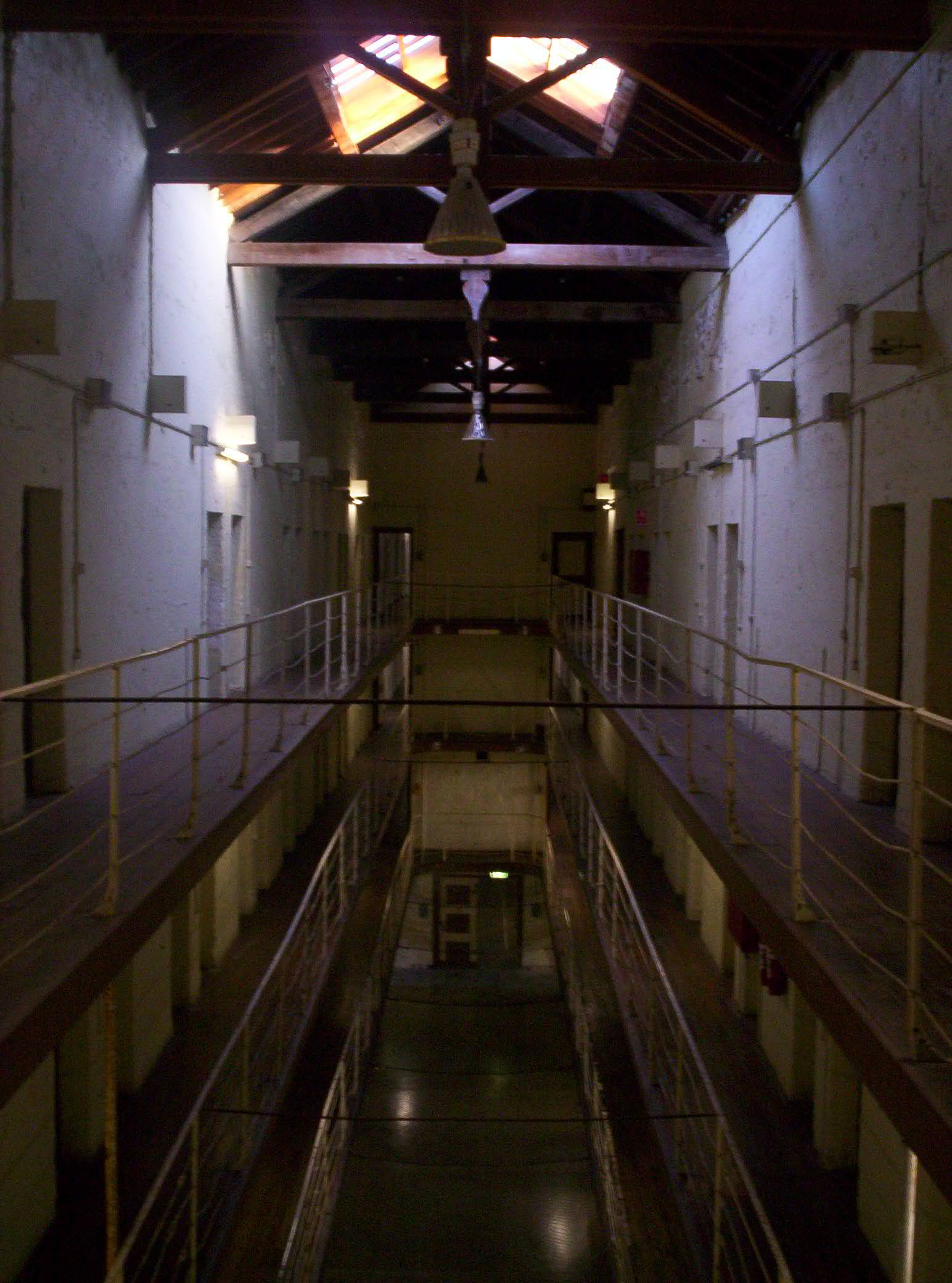
Restored division 3

The Fremantle Prison riot was a prison riot that occurred on 4 January 1988 at Fremantle Prison, in Western Australia. Prisoners created a fire and temperatures inside the cells were recorded at 52.2 °C (126.0 °F). 3 division and 4 division were taken over by a total of seventy prisoners, and 5 officers were taken hostage. The fire caused A$1.8 million, equivalent to A$4.6 million in 2022, in damage and unintentionally prevented the planned escape.

It was suggested by the media that the riot and fire was staged as a diversion by twelve men, including Brenden Abbott, to assist a mass escape from the prison. However, an official report concluded there was little evidence to support this, and that the riot was largely the result of an incident that morning involving the mistreatment of a prisoner. Outdated conditions at the prison, which was built during the 1850s and had no flushing toilets, or heating or cooling, had exacerbated tensions. Calls for the closure of the prison had been delayed for decades, and the riot is credited with fast-tracking the final closure of the prison three years later.

== Background ==
Fremantle Prison was built using convict labour during the 1850s, based on the design of Pentonville Gaol, and was used as the maximum security prison for male offenders in Western Australia. During the 1890s the size of the cells were doubled by removing an adjoining wall between two cells. The conditions in the cells remained unchanged except for lighting; there were no toilets and no heating or cooling, leading to very high and low temperatures in summer and winter respectively. Plans to close the prison due to its outdated conditions and facilities had been repeatedly delayed for many decades. The prison population was divided into 4 divisions; 3 division housing violent prisoners and 4 division housing murderers and those serving long term sentences.

The morning of the riot began as an ordinary day would, with cells unlocked at 7:00 am. There was a "scuffle" between a prisoner and guards over the time taken to leave his cell – resulting in that prisoner being sent to solitary confinement – but that was not particularly unusual. Later that morning the prisoner was released into the exercise yard, where he reported to his fellow prisoners that he had been beaten by the prison officers. Prisoners then requested a meeting with the Superintendent; this was denied, but a request for medical examination was granted.

This incident added to growing tension amongst the prisoners from the heatwave experienced over the past week, with conditions like ovens or saunas. Despite the heat, officers decided prisoners should remain outside in the exercise yards in the afternoon, to settle the tension. The decision did not have the intended calming effect, instead allowing prisoner ring leaders to spread discontentment, and plan for a riot, including starting a fire and taking hostages.

== The riot ==
As division 3 prisoners were let inside at around 4 pm, a voice exclaimed "Let's take 'em", and simultaneously, guards were splashed with boiling water, usually used for making tea. A large number of prisoners stormed the cellblock, attacking the guards with whatever they could find – metal plates and cutlery, food, "pieces of timber, buckets, water bottles, anything". The result was pandemonium; prisoners rushed along landings, overpowering officers and taking them hostage, while at the same time, other prisoners darted between cells, starting fires. The prisoners withdrew to the exercise yard, taking six hostages, as flames quickly overran the building, spread into the rafters, and caused the roof to collapse.

The prisoners surrounded their hostages, and in turn were besieged by an armed riot squad inside the prison, and the police riot squad encircled the prison. Skilled police negotiators communicated with the ring leaders, and by nightfall only five hostages remained. A sixth officer was to have been kept, but was released as he was seriously injured. Meanwhile, the fire brigade had trouble bringing the inferno in the main cell block under control. The prison's gate was too narrow for their trucks to pass, so they had to water the flames from outside, and prisoners impeded their endeavours by chucking debris at them, including segments of asbestos roofing. Eventually firemen were allowed inside to fight the fire, after prison officers with riot gear had stormed through a secondary group of prisoners, forcing them back along the wall.

The prisoners' leaders made three demands: a meeting with Attorney General Joseph Berinson, access to the media, and a guarantee of no retribution afterwards. Negotiations continued throughout the night, with the prisoners holding out for 19 hours. The next morning the hostages were released, one at a time – traded for food and cigarettes, even though only the third demand had been met. The prisoners did, however, have an opportunity to communicate with the press during the siege, as the riot was a live media event. Television helicopters were filming from overhead, and prisoners were able to write messages on sheets with charcoal. One of the hostages believed that "the media nearly got [them] killed", as the close approach of incoming aircraft caused other prisoners to panic, thinking that special forces were being deployed.

== Aftermath ==
Although there were no deaths, the fire caused A$1.8 million of damage, and officers were injured physically, and some developed post-traumatic stress disorder. In the aftermath of the riot, there was extensive media attention on Fremantle Prison, and investigative journalists uncovered that warnings had been given to the prison authorities. The government hastily initiated an enquiry into the incident, and a report was completed within six weeks. The report suggested that little evidence supported the escape plan theory common in the media, but that the riot was largely the result of an incident of that morning involving the mistreatment of a prisoner and his subsequent release into three division yard. The riot is credited with fast-tracking the closure of the outdated gaol three years later.

A trial involving thirty-three prisoners charged over the riot was also held. It cost over $3 million, involved 19 lawyers, and as of 2003, is the largest trial held in the state's history. Prisoners, escorted under armed guard, gave evidence from behind specially installed glass. The whole affair was "described as a circus", especially after a prisoner protested by appearing naked. The trial resulted in extended sentences for the prisoners. The twelve ringleaders were given six years cumulative with their current sentences, and the other 21 were given three years cumulative with their current sentences.

One ringleader, Brenden Abbott, successfully escaped from Fremantle Prison in late 1989 and spent nearly five and a half years on the run before being caught in 1995.
