= Brenden Abbott =

Australian bank robber (born 1962)

Brenden James Abbott
- Brenden James Abbott
- Born: Brenden James Abbott; 8 May 1962 (age 64)
- Other name: The Postcard Bandit
- Occupation: Bank robber
- Status: Remanded in custody
- Convictions: Bank robbery, Prison escape
- Penalty: 25 years' imprisonment (13-year non-parole period)

Brenden James Abbott (born 8 May 1962) is a convicted Australian bank robber. He is reported to have stolen and hidden millions of dollars, and was dubbed "the postcard bandit" by police seeking media coverage.

Abbott was held in a maximum-security prison in Queensland until he was transferred in 2016 to Casuarina Prison in Western Australia. He will be eligible for parole in 2028.

== Personal ==
A former ward of the state of Western Australia, Abbott continues to suffer anxiety and related health disorders, as noted in a semi-biographical work, Australian Outlaw, by Derek Pedley. Abbott attended Eastern Hills High School in Mount Helena and was considered an average to good student. His watercolour "Little Boy Blue" was painted after the November 2009 national apology to Forgotten Australians.

Abbott is recognised as a highly intelligent criminal and "minor genius" with a strong reliance on memory and observational skills to carry out his criminal activities. He used his knowledge and self-taught skills in make-up to create convincing disguises, computers to create false IDs, and electronics to dodge alarms and police. Weeks were spent methodically planning each bank robbery including observing the staff in the bank, identifying weaknesses in security, patterns of behaviour and the layout of the premises prior to the robbery taking place. These skills are widely thought to have assisted him in both successful prison escapes. Police officers who have interviewed Abbott have stated he is always probing for information on how he has been caught or what the police know about him. Abbott used his understanding of police methodology and intelligence gathering to successfully avoid capture during his time as an escapee.

== Fremantle Prison escape – 1989 ==
In 1986, during questioning in relation to a burglary, Abbott fled from police at the Nollamara police station. In 1987 he committed his first bank robbery, stealing $112,000 from the Commonwealth Bank in Perth. Later the same year, Abbott was arrested at Perth Airport. Sentenced to Fremantle Prison, Abbott was given duties in the tailor’s workshop, fitting and sewing uniforms. Through this workshop Abbott and Aaron Reynolds were able to create fake prison guard uniforms. On 24 November 1989 Abbott, dressed in the fake uniform, cut through the bars in the workshop and gained access to the guard's walkway, making his way across the rooftop and out of the prison grounds. This escape earned Abbott his lifelong notoriety as a criminal genius, ultimately leading to his permanent and erroneous branding as "the Postcard Bandit." By the time Fremantle Prison closed in 1991, Abbott was the only prisoner in its 136-year history to escape and have never been returned.

== Fugitive 1989–1995 ==
While Reynolds was arrested within weeks of the Fremantle escape, Abbott went on to establish himself as a "professional" bank robber, believed to have been responsible for "40 to 50" bank robberies across Western Australia, South Australia and Queensland's Gold Coast. Working in Abbott's favour, the Adelaide police force was structured with each suburb having its own CIB office, limiting communication between the departments and making Adelaide a repeated target. Rivalry between the states made intelligence sharing minimal and Western Australian Police were yet to issue a warrant for Abbott's arrest almost five years following the escape. By 1994 the states' police departments compromised and agreed to work together. Elevated to the status of Australia's most wanted man, his five-and-a-half years on the run came to an end when police tracked down a post-office box on Queensland's Gold Coast used by Abbott, which was found to contain a pager bill registered to the address where he was living. On 26 December 1995 Abbott was recaptured.

Media reports in the 1990s said Abbott sent postcards of his travels to the Western Australian Police. However, the story was a WA Police media unit concoction; the "postcards" were photos Abbott lost while running from police with Aaron Reynolds after the Fremantle Prison escape, and were intended for his friends and family. They included a picture of Reynolds outside the Dwellingup police station.

== Sir David Longland Prison escape – 1997 ==
On 5 November 1997, less than three years after his recapture, Abbott escaped with four other prisoners from Sir David Longland Prison at Wacol, Queensland. Using angel wire—diamond-encrusted wire—smuggled into the prison to cut through the bars in their cells, the escapees made it to the perimeter sensor fence where they were thrown bolt cutters by an accomplice, Brendan Berichon, who had been released in September. Uncharacteristically for Abbott, the escape from Sir David Longland Prison in November 1997 involved actual force rather than an implied threat of force. While cutting through the sensor fencing, the alarm was raised. Berichon was armed and fired on a patrol vehicle successfully disabling it. Guards were pinned down by the shots. The offenders alleged that this occurred in panic, when the escapees' escape plan went awry. Nonetheless, it gave the escapees enough time to cut through the fence and escape in the car driven by Berichon.

== Fugitive 1997–1998 ==
Abbott was on the run for six months from 1997 to 1998. On 2 May 1998 he was eventually caught in Darwin and was, as of March 2015, serving a 23-year sentence in Queensland for bank robberies and the 1997 prison escape. Following his recapture, Abbott was transferred to Maximum Security at Woodford Correctional Centre. Due to Abbott's high risk profile, he was flown into the prison by helicopter, being the only prisoner in Australia to have arrived directly by air. After serving two years of his current sentence in solitary confinement, he sued the Queensland Government for mistreatment. He was released from solitary confinement in May 2004 and returned there on a Maximum Security Order in April 2006, after he requested medical attention three times in 12 months. After years in mainstream, Abbott was again returned to Supermax solitary confinement in August 2008 and then released back into mainstream detention in the days preceding a judicial review hearing into his back-to-back Maximum Security Orders, in October 2009.

== Attempts to transfer ==
A 1994 warrant for questioning remains in place with Adelaide Criminal Prosecutions Branch for one count of armed robbery in Glenelg, South Australia. In mid-2008, Abbott applied for an interstate transfer to South Australia to address the outstanding warrant. The application followed official statements by Adelaide detective Sid Thomas, in The Advertiser in 2008, that detectives were travelling to Queensland to question Abbott at Woodford Correctional Centre, although no such interview has ever occurred. In December 2010, Abbott's application for a transfer to South Australian was approved by the Queensland Attorney-General, and the South Australian Attorney-General's decision was pending. On 12 June 2011, The Advertiser journalist Nigel Hunt incorrectly reported that Abbott had filed for a Supreme Court judicial review of the application to transfer him. Hunt's story concluded with an unnamed source's suspicions that Abbott might have committed not just the offence he was sought for questioning over, but a number of robberies in South Australia.

While Abbott was serving his Queensland sentence, Western Australia refused his applications in 2005 and 2008 to be transferred to that state to complete his sentence. In 2004, Queensland authorities approved an interstate transfer but Western Australian Attorney-General Jim McGinty refused to accept him. In early 2007, Abbott re-applied to be transferred to Western Australia and that was approved by the Queensland Attorney-General in 2008. However, then WA Corrective Services Minister, Margaret Quirk, promptly issued a media statement rejecting Abbott's bid to return home. He had unsuccessfully applied for transfer to Western Australia four times in response to outstanding warrants. In May 2010, Glenn Cordingley of The Sunday Times in Perth, cited an unnamed Western Australian police source who alleged that WA authorities "had a cell waiting" for Abbott, although there had been no official confirmation of that.

On 4 May 2016, Abbott was extradited to Western Australia to complete the sentence of 16 years, nine months and two days that he was serving for armed robbery and his role in the Fremantle Prison riot at the time of his escape in 1989, consisting of 12 years, six months and 24 days, plus an additional one-third penalty of four years, two months and eight days in forfeited remissions for escaping custody under the then law. On 16 January 2017, Abbott was sentenced to an additional and cumulative five months' imprisonment for the 1989 escape.

In June 2019, Abbott had a bid for freedom unanimously rejected by the WA Court of Appeal. Lawyers argued the sentence should be reduced because he had already spent 17 years in prison in Queensland for crimes committed before his Fremantle Prison escape in 1989. The court ruled that the original sentences were appropriate, and would not intervene on the basis of mercy, noting Abbott had deliberately committed the subsequent crimes that led to his imprisonment in Queensland.

Abbott's Western Australian sentence is set to expire in July 2033 although, if no further charges are laid against him, he will be eligible for parole in July 2026. He will remain on parole in Queensland until July 2040, when he will be 78 years of age.

== Media depictions ==
A television film about Abbott, The Postcard Bandit, was made in 2003.

A six-episode Binge series based on Abbott's criminal career began production in June 2025. Entitled Run, it was released in January 2026.

== See also ==
- Fremantle Prison riot
