= James Walsh (convict) =

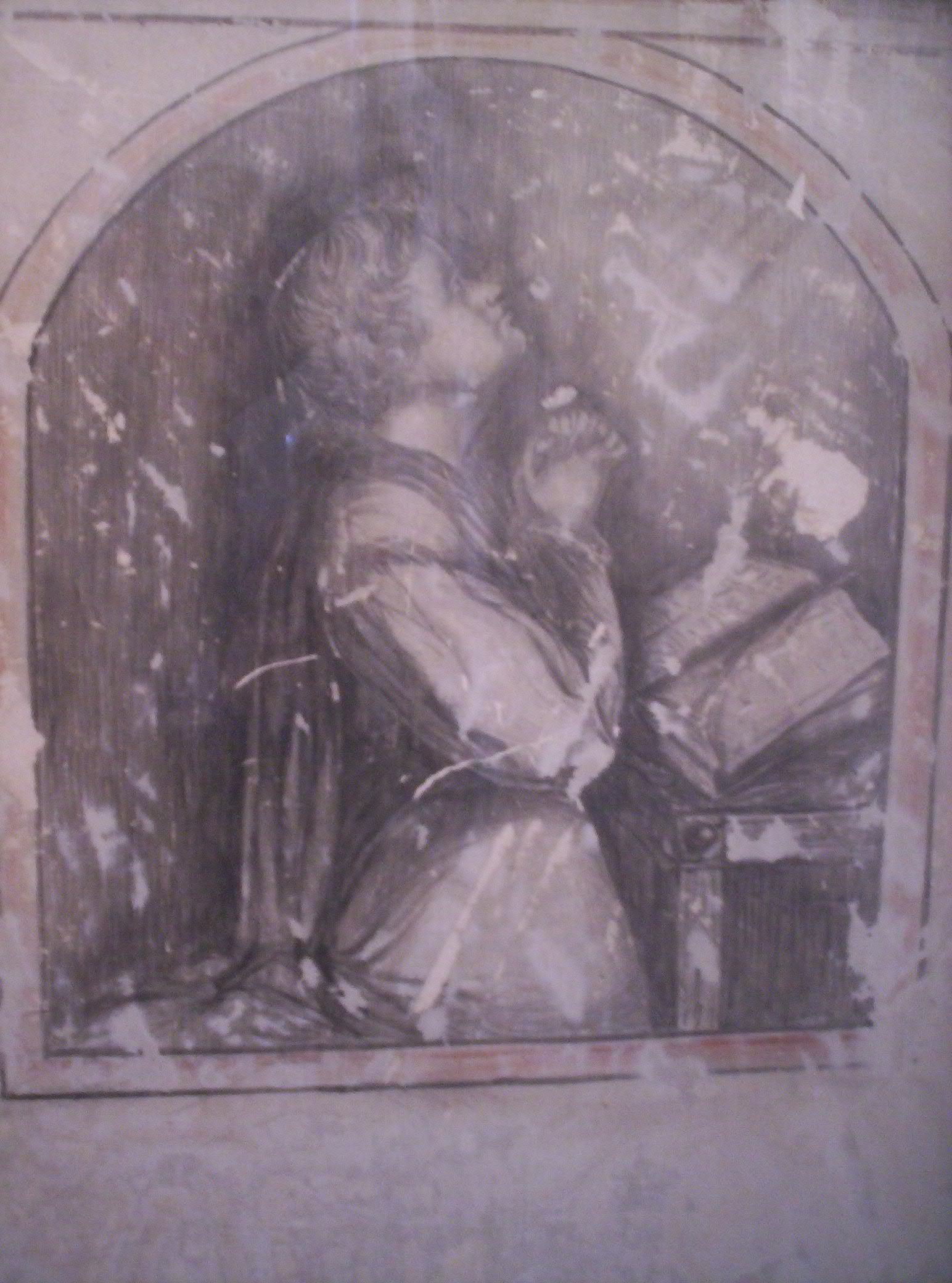
Drawing found in James Walsh's cell

James Walsh (c. 1833–1871) was a transported convict and artist. He is known for artworks depicting the early Swan River Colony and native Australian life. He is also thought to have been responsible for a number of fine-quality classical drawings on the wall of Fremantle Prison in Western Australia, which were accidentally uncovered beneath whitewash in 1945.

== Imprisonment ==
Walsh, a clerk and painter, was convicted at the Old Bailey, London, in 1852 aged 20 for stealing two diamond crosses and 13 diamonds from Jean-Baptiste Girard. He was also charged with forging an order of goods. He received 15 years' transportation.

He arrived in Western Australia on board Ramillies on 10 August 1854 and was held at Fremantle convict establishment for two years. He was released for four months then convicted again for forgery of a one-pound note. For this crime he was sentenced to eight years' imprisonment. At some time during this sentence, he is thought to have drawn intricate drawings of religious figures, Roman and Greek mythological depictions, and images of Queen Victoria on the walls of his small cell. He was released in 1867 and worked as a painter and clerk until his death from tuberculosis in 1871.

Almost a century later, in 1964, intricate classically styled artworks and texts were uncovered in a storeroom that was once his cell after a prison guard damaged the wall by accident, removing whitewash and revealing the artwork. One incomplete sentence reads "J Walsh left this cell 9 mar". Today the cell can be viewed as part of tours of the now-closed prison site.

Walsh is also credited with several artworks displayed at the Art Gallery of Western Australia depicting the early Swan River Colony, including a set of twelve watercolour sketches depicting native Australian life.
