= Melaleuca Women's Prison =

Women's prison in Perth, Western Australia

- Interactive map of Melaleuca Women's Prison
- Location: Canning Vale, Western Australia; 32.1054°S 115.921°E
- Status: Operational
- Security class: Maximum
- Capacity: 254
- Opened: December 2016
- Managed by: Sodexo
- Website: correctiveservices.wa.gov.au/Prisons/prison-locations/melaleuca.aspx

Melaleuca Women's Prison is a maximum security prison for women, in Canning Vale, Western Australia. It opened in December 2016, and has a capacity of 254 inmates. Melaleuca is a standalone facility, built on what were previously Units 11 and 12 of Hakea Prison.

The prison was initially operated by the private company Sodexo. The state government paid Sodexo a bonus for reducing recidivism – A$15,000 for each inmate who stays out of prison for two years. This incentive scheme was the first of its type in Australia. In April 2020, the Department of Justice took over operations and continues to operate the prison, leaving Acacia Prison the only remaining private prison in Western Australia. In 2023, Western Australia’s inspector of custodial services declared the prison was not fit to house women, especially pregnant ones.

The prison is named after the Melaleuca plant, and was formerly known as the Melaleuca Remand and Reintegration Facility.
