= Casuarina Prison =

Maximum-security prison in Perth, Western Australia

- Interactive map of Casuarina Prison
- Location: Casuarina, Western Australia, 30 kilometres (19 mi) south of Perth; 32°14′23″S 115°52′41″E
- Status: Operational
- Security class: Minimum to maximum (Male)
- Capacity: 1200
- Opened: June 1991; 35 years ago
- Managed by: Department of Justice, Western Australia

Casuarina Prison is the main maximum-security prison for Western Australia, located in the Perth, Western Australia suburb of Casuarina. The prison accommodates minimum, medium and maximum-security prisoners. It was opened in 1991 to replace Fremantle Prison, which was 130 years old. The prison was the scene of a riot on Christmas Day 1998. The prison featured in the documentary Australia's Hardest Prison: Lockdown Oz on the National Geographic channel in 2008, following the lives of prisoners and officers.

The prison has been subject of multiple legal actions due to alleged "inhumane conditions". In 2022, seventeen teenagers were relocated to the maximum security prison prompting a class action. The Department of Justice has defended its actions, while victim advocates have raised concerns around the law firm representing the youth. The Australian Human Rights Commission has raised concerns about the issue of teenagers being held at the prison, prompting calls for further action.

Scenes from the 2013 film Son of a Gun were filmed inside the prison.

== Notable prisoners ==
- Brendan Abbott
- Jack Roche
- Dante Arthurs
- David Birnie (1951–2005)
- Robert Bropho (1930–2011)
- Terence Kelly, Kidnapper of Cleo Smith
- Bradley Edwards, convicted of the Claremont serial killings
- Cleveland Dodd (died on 19 October 2023)
