= Hakea Prison =

Prison in Perth, Western Australia

- Interactive map of Hakea Prison
- Location: Canning Vale, Western Australia; 32°6′6″S 115°55′10″E
- Status: Operational
- Security class: Minimum to maximum (male)
- Capacity: 1225 (as at 21 October 2015)
- Opened: June 1982
- Managed by: Department of Justice, Western Australia

Hakea Prison is a maximum security prison for males, located in Canning Vale, Western Australia. The facility is managed by the Department of Justice on behalf of the Government of Western Australia.

The prison officially opened in June 1982 as Canning Vale Prison, managing 248 prisoners. From September 1991, Canning Vale Prison operated as a maximum-security prison until, in 2000, it merged with the CW Campbell Remand Centre and became Hakea Prison. Hakea Prison manages prisoners in custody to appear in court (on remand) and those who have just been sentenced. Most newly sentenced prisoners are assessed at Hakea Prison before being placed at other Western Australian prisons.

Hakea Prison has specialist management units known as punishment units which have been described by the state regulator as "outdated and not fit for purpose" because of the intense psychological damage they inflict on inmates as well as the inability of guards to monitor the cells. These punishment units do not have showers and deprive inmates of several officially required amenities such as human contact. In March 2022 an Indigenous man suicided in one of the punishment cells after his repeated calls for help from guards were ignored.

In 2016, Units 11 and 12 of the Hakea facility were converted into the separate Melaleuca Remand and Reintegration Facility for women.
