= Broken Lives =

Book by Estelle Blackburn

Broken Lives — The Complete Life and Crimes of Serial Killer Eric Edgar Cooke
- First edition
- Author: Estelle Blackburn
- Language: English
- Subject: Serial murderers, false imprisonment
- Genre: Crime
- Publisher: Stellar Publishing
- Publication date: 1998
- Publication place: Australia
- Pages: 462
- ISBN: 978-0-64636-173-4
- OCLC: 223248053

Broken Lives is a 1998 non-fiction book written by Estelle Blackburn. The book is about the false imprisonment of John Button and Darryl Beamish, who were both convicted of murders committed by serial killer Eric Cooke.

The book led to re-opening the cases of both Button and Beamish and quashing their long-standing convictions.

== Background ==
In 1963, John Button was convicted of the manslaughter of his girlfriend, Rosemary Anderson. Button was originally charged with wilful murder but the jury found him guilty of the lesser charge and was sentenced to 10 years jail. Button's brother approached Blackburn in January 1992, claiming his older brother had been framed for a murder committed by Eric Cooke. Though skeptical, Blackburn met John Button in February of that year. After hearing his testimony and reading the appeal books kept from his previous court actions, she decided that his case would be an appropriate topic for the book.

The key discovery in the revision of the case histories was that Eric Cooke had been a multiple-method killer. His offences show a significant deviation from the pattern generally accepted as the orthodox "serial killer" template, which holds that such killers choose victims based on gender, race, age, or other factors. Cooke, conversely, killed or attempted to kill persons of both sexes and a wide spread of ages and social circumstances.

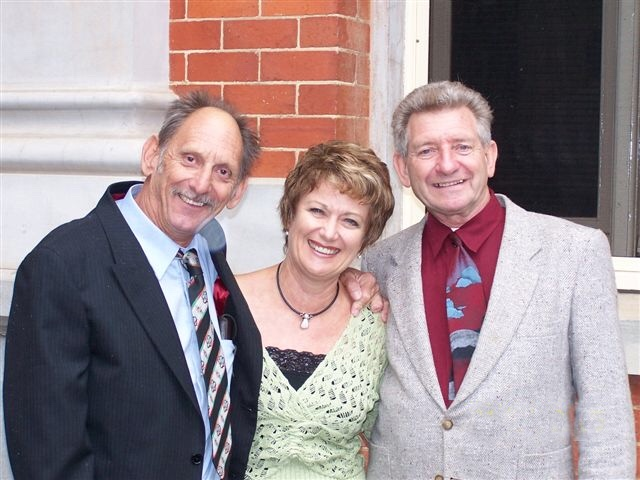
Darryl Beamish, Estelle Blackburn and John Button at the Supreme Court celebrating Beamish's exoneration on 1 April 2005 (44 years after conviction), following Button's exoneration on 25 February 2002 (39 years after conviction).

Blackburn discovered, once granted access to police archives, that the police had not emphasised this behaviour pattern of Cooke in their public statements. They made no public announcement that Cooke had attacked seven other women in five hit-runs and five other women asleep in their beds, women who survived the attacks. So the Western Australian community at large and the legal advocates for Button and Beamish were unaware that Cooke had attempted murder by vehicle impact. This was the means by which John Button's girlfriend, 17-year-old Rosemary Anderson, had been killed. At the time of Button's trial for her wilful murder, her death appeared to be an isolated event and his claim that he had coincidentally discovered her after the attack seemed implausible. Likewise, during Darryl Beamish's trial for the wilful murder of 22-year-old heiress Jillian Brewer (who was attacked while she slept), the offence was not placed in the context of the series of assaults that Cooke had committed against other women asleep in their homes. Instead, the prosecution cited crimes that Beamish had actually committed, including the molestation of four young girls, as proof that he was guilty of murder.

The location and interviewing of the other, surviving, victims of Cooke and the creation of a detailed analysis of his life and criminal career produced the narrative history, "Broken Lives". This work had a powerful impact on the public discourse about jurisprudence in Western Australia and the process of completing it created relationships between justice advocates in the fields of journalism and the legal profession which provided the impetus for a renewed campaign to clear Button and Beamish.

Following the initial publication of Broken Lives in 1998, Blackburn became the recipient of a number of awards, the most significant being the Medal of the Order of Australia, a Walkley Award for the greatest contribution to journalism, and induction into the Western Australian Women's Hall of Fame. Renewed public interest in the cases led to several appearances in the electronic media, including on ABC Television's high-profile programme, Australian Story. This increased media profile afforded an opportunity to engage in paid public speaking and invitations to contribute to true-crime anthologies.

Blackburn also assisted in preparing the appeal cases for John Button and Darryl Beamish and acted as media liaison for the defence team during the preparation for and hearing of the appeals. In 2002, this epic story of Western Australian jurisprudence, which began with the events of the late 1950s and early 1960s, approached its conclusion: the conviction of John Button for manslaughter was quashed. Darryl Beamish's wilful murder conviction was quashed in 2005.

== See also ==
- Claremont serial killings
