= Estelle Blackburn =

Australian journalist

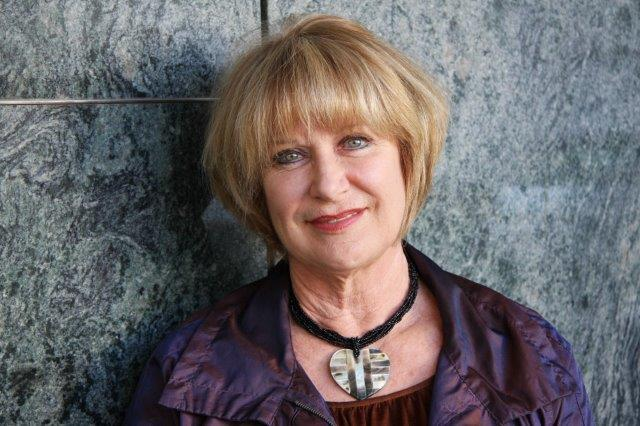
Estelle Blackburn

Estelle Blackburn OAM (born 1950) is an Australian journalist who played a crucial role in the review of several controversial criminal cases in Western Australia.

== Early life ==
Born in 1950 in Nedlands, Western Australia, to Margaret Mercer Blackburn (1920–90) and George Everard Blackburn (1917–82), and younger sister of Dr Gregory Blackburn (born 30 May 1947), Estelle Blackburn spent her pre-school years in Northam, Western Australia.

In 1956, her father's employment as a personnel manager with AMP Limited required the family to return to Perth where she attended Floreat Primary School in 1956 and Presbyterian Ladies' College Primary School from 1957 to 1961. She then attended and completed high school at Methodist Ladies' College, Perth, from 1962 to 1967, obtaining a Western Australian Leaving Certificate with distinctions in the subjects English and Music.

== Education and early career ==
When unsuccessful in her initial application for a journalism cadetship with West Australian Newspapers she was offered a position with the company as a clerk in the newspaper library which she occupied for three months. In 1968, she gained a Commonwealth government scholarship to attend the University of Western Australia as a full-time student. She succeeded in entering the journalism cadetship program in 1969. While working for WA Newspapers, she completed a Bachelor of Arts degree part-time with a double major in psychology and anthropology. At WA Newspapers she progressed from general news and minor features to coverage of the proceedings of the WA state parliament.

In 1974, she travelled to Europe contributing some articles to Western Australian journals as a freelance correspondent. In 1980, she returned to Perth and joined the ABC as a radio and television reporter. In 1985, she was invited to apply for a position in the media office of the WA government as the media advisor to the minister for police and local government, Jeff Carr, and later Gordon Hill. In 1990, she became junior media advisor in the office of the premier of Western Australia, Carmen Lawrence, until the defeat of the Lawrence government in 1993.

== Author ==
=== Broken Lives ===
John Button's brother, who met Blackburn at a dance in November 1991, claimed his older brother had been framed for a murder committed by Eric Cooke. Though skeptical Blackburn met John Button in February 1992. After hearing his testimony and reading the appeal books kept from his previous court actions, decided that his case would be an appropriate topic for a book.

During the following ten years this project became a combined exercise in authorship and citizen advocacy which led to the re-opening of the cases of both Button and Darryl Beamish and the quashing of their long-standing convictions. The key discovery in the revision of the case histories was that Eric Cooke had been a multiple-method killer. His offences show a significant deviation from the pattern generally accepted as the orthodox serial killer template which holds that such killers target the same type of victim in the same way, impelled by the same underlying motive. Police at the time didn't make public Cooke's deviation from this.

Following the initial publication of Broken Lives in 1998, Blackburn became the recipient of a number of awards, the most significant being the Medal of the Order of Australia and a Walkley Award. Renewed public interest in the cases led to several appearances in the electronic media, including two on ABC Television's high-profile program, Australian Story, in 1998 'Dancing with Strangers' and 2002 'Murder He Wrote'. on 60 Minutes Australia 'Dead Man Talking' and on USA's Forensic Files 'Dueling Confessions'. This increased media profile afforded an opportunity to engage in paid public speaking and invitations to contribute to true-crime anthologies.

Blackburn assisted in preparation of the appeal cases for John Button and Darryl Beamish, and acted as media liaison for the defence team. In 2002, the conviction of John Button for manslaughter was quashed; in 2005, Darryl Beamish's wilful murder conviction was quashed.

=== The End of Innocence ===
In 2007, Blackburn's next book, The End of Innocence, was published. A partial autobiography (memoir), it revisited the topics covered in Broken Lives and told the story of the investigation which produced it. This work contained a background story of Blackburn's own experience of violence at the time of writing her first book. This attracted media attention and led to further appearances on radio and television programmes (including a return to Australian Story in November 2007 'Before You Leap').

== Awards ==
Blackburn has received the following awards and honours:

- Medal of the Order of Australia. Date granted: 10 June 2002 Citation: "For service to the community through investigative journalism in Western Australia."
- Walkley Award for Most Outstanding Contribution to Journalism in 2001. This award recognises long-term commitment and achievement in the Australian media. It has been awarded annually since 1994.
- Western Australian Premier's Book Award in 1999 in the category Historical & Critical Studies for Broken Lives.
- The Crime Writers Association of Australia's Ned Kelly Award for Best True Crime (Non-Fiction) in 2001 for Broken Lives.
- Perth Press Club Award for sustained excellence in journalism - 1999
- Clarion Award for greatest contribution to the profession, WA - 1999 See Media and Entertainment Alliance, WA.
- Magazine Publishers' Association Story of the Year - 2002
- WA Woman of the Year - 2005
- Churchill Fellowship - 2007 to look at innocence projects in UK, US and Canada
- WA Citizen of the Year in the category of Arts, Culture & Entertainment - 2010
- Induction into the inaugural WA Women's Hall of Fame, 100 women, March 2011

== Published works ==
- Blackburn, Estelle (2005). Broken Lives. Hardie Grant. ISBN 9781740640732.
- A condensed version of Broken Lives was published by Reader's Digest, Australia and New Zealand, in Encounters in November, 2002, and in 2008
- Blackburn, Estelle (2007). The End of Innocence. Hardie Grant. ISBN 978-1-74066-162-1.
- Blackburn, Estelle (2000). "The WA Bikie Wars". In Malcolm Brown (ed.). Bombs Guns and Knives; Violent Crime in Australia. New Holland. ISBN 1-86436-668-0.
- Blackburn, Estelle (2002). "Righting Wrongs". In Stephen Tanner (ed.). Journalism: Investigation & Research. Pearson Education Australia. ISBN 0-7339-9931-X.
- Blackburn, Estelle (2007). "Dancing With Strangers". In Deborah Fleming (ed.). Australian Story - Off the Record. ABC Books. ISBN 978-0-7333-2134-4.
- Blackburn, Estelle (March 2001). "The Story of Broken Lives". HQ Magazine..

== See also ==
- Ronald Wilson
- Colleen Egan
