= Patrushev =

Patrushev (Russian: Патрушев) is a Russian masculine surname, its feminine counterpart is Patrusheva. It may refer to

- Dmitry Patrushev (born 1977), Russian banker and politician
- Nikolai Patrushev (born 1951), Russian political and security figure
- Pyotr Patrushev (1942-2016), Russian author
