= Marcus Einfeld =

Australian judge and perjurer (born 1938)

Judge of the Federal Court of Australia
- In office 18 December 1986 – 16 April 2001
- Appointed by: Ninian Stephen

President of the Human Rights and Equal Opportunity Commission
- In office 10 December 1986 – 10 December 1989
- Preceded by: New position
- Succeeded by: Ronald Wilson

Personal details
- Born: Marcus Richard Einfeld; 22 September 1938 (age 88) Sydney, New South Wales, Australia
- Relations: Syd Einfeld (father)
- Education: University of Sydney (LL.B.)

Marcus Richard Einfeld (born 22 September 1938) is an Australian former judge of the Federal Court of Australia and was the inaugural president of the Human Rights and Equal Opportunity Commission. He was convicted of perjury and perverting the course of justice and served two years in prison.

Einfeld studied law at the University of Sydney. His father Syd Einfeld was a federal MP. He was called to the bar in 1962, and appointed Queen's Counsel (QC) in 1977. From 1972 to 1976, Einfeld was a director of the World Jewish Congress, based in London. After returning to Australia he became one of Sydney's most prominent barristers. Einfeld was appointed to the Federal Court in 1986, serving until 2001. In the same year he was made the inaugural president of the Human Rights and Equal Opportunity Commission, serving until 1989. He was also the inaugural president of the Australian Paralympic Committee from 1990 to 1992.

In 2006, Einfeld was issued a A$77 speeding ticket for travelling 10 km/h (6.2 mph) over the limit. He appealed the ticket, claiming that he had not been driving. Journalists subsequently discovered that he had made a number of false statements under oath; the woman he had said was driving had in fact died several years earlier. Einfeld was arrested in 2007, and the following year pleaded guilty to perjury and perverting the course of justice. He was sentenced to three years' imprisonment. As a result of his actions, Einfeld was expelled from the legal profession and stripped of many of the honours he had previously accumulated, including his status as a Queen's Counsel, appointment of the Order of Australia, and his status as a National Living Treasure.

== Early life ==
Einfeld was born in Sydney, and was named after his paternal grandfather who had died a year earlier. He has a sister. His parents were the Labor Party politician Syd Einfeld and his wife Billie (Rosabelle) Einfeld (née Appelboom), who married in June 1934. His father served in both Federal Parliament and the Parliament of New South Wales. Einfeld's paternal grandfather was the Reverend Marcus Einfeld (1874–1937), who came to Australia in 1909 (becoming the chazan and the Second Minister of the Great Synagogue) by way of London, England, to which he had immigrated from Jarosław in Galicia with his wife Deborah (née Gabel; d. 1957).

Einfeld attended Sydney Boys High School from 1951 to 1955. He then obtained his Bachelor of Laws degree from the University of Sydney in 1962. At some point, Einfeld began claiming that he held doctorates from both "Century University" and "Pacific Western University"; both are U.S.-based diploma mills without any accreditation as law schools. Those qualifications were referred to by Attorney-General Lionel Bowen when Einfeld was added to the Federal Court in 1987, and were listed in his Who's Who in Australia entry until 2007. His updated Who's Who entry, which was published after he had been arrested and charged with perjury, also corrected his year of birth (previously listed as 1939) and removed a claim that he had once been a director of the multinational firm Marks & Spencer in the 1970s.

=== Marriages and children ===
Einfeld has four children, two from each of two marriages. He married his first wife Yetta, a teacher, in 1963 and they had two children before they divorced in 1977. He married his second wife Anne, an attorney, in 1982 and they had two children before they divorced in 1996.

He was subsequently in a long-term relationship with Sylvia Eisman.

== Legal and judicial career ==
Einfeld became a barrister in 1962. He was appointed a Queen's Counsel (QC) in 1977, aged 39. He represented High Court Justice Lionel Murphy in his legal challenge to the Parliamentary Commission of Inquiry which had been established to examine whether Murphy had perverted the course of justice; the inquiry was suspended when Murphy became terminally ill.

Einfeld was appointed to the Federal Court in 1986. Einfeld was also an additional Justice of the Australian Capital Territory. He retired as a judge in April 2001. Einfeld was the founding president of the Australian Human Rights and Equal Opportunity Commission. He was appointed to a seven-year term in December 1986, but resigned after three years citing an inability to combine the role with his judicial duties. In 1987 he led the commission's enquiry into the living conditions of Aboriginal people in the border area of New South Wales and Queensland. An Aboriginal elder praised his work with Indigenous communities when he was Human Rights Commissioner.

== Community and social involvement ==
In 1989, Einfeld was interviewed by Caroline Jones on her Radio National program The Search for Meaning.

Einfeld has served as Austcare's "Ambassador for Refugees", and as a UNICEF "Ambassador for Children". In 1997, he was named by the National Trust of Australia as an Australian Living Treasure, one of up to 100 living people selected by popular vote for having made outstanding contributions to Australian society. In 2002 he was granted the United Nations Peace Award. He has also served as National Vice President of the International Commission of Jurists (Australian Section). In 2002, he was presented a United Nations Association of Australia Founder's Award for his contribution to justice and human rights. He served as Chairman of Legal Resources International Inc., a non-government organisation funded by lawyers and the World Bank and Commonwealth Secretariat, dedicated to advising developing countries on establishing proper systems for democracy and justice.

He was made an Officer of the Order of Australia for services to international affairs and the protection of human rights in 1998. He was also the inaugural President of the Australian Paralympic Federation.

Einfeld has served as an executive member of the New South Wales Jewish Board of Deputies and as a Councillor on the Executive Council of Australian Jewry. He also started and served as the first chairman of the Australian Campaign for the Rescue of Soviet Jewry, following his earlier establishment of the London-based National Campaign for Soviet Jewry of the United Kingdom and Ireland. Einfeld has been a spokesperson for Israeli and Jewish causes, and has contributed to public debate on Palestine, the media, the United Nations, universities, and other institutions. In 1997 President of the Palestinian National Authority Yasser Arafat chose him to assist in overhauling the Palestinian Authority's legal system. He was an invited speaker at United Israel Appeal (UIA) functions in Britain, the United States, Europe, Canada, and Australia. He is patron of the Australian Association of Jewish Holocaust Survivors and Descendants and of the Sydney Jewish Museum.

=== Controversies ===
In a March 2006 address on the war on terror and civil liberties at the University of Western Sydney, he stated that Western powers, including Australia, had supported terrorist regimes financially, and that new sedition laws showed that Australia was "leaning towards an autocratic framework".

Einfeld was the President of Australian Legal Resources International, a non-profit independent group of lawyers that supported democracy, human rights, and the rule of law in developing countries. In August 2006, this organisation collapsed, leaving creditors, including AusAID, the Australian Taxation Office, and St.George Bank "thousands of dollars out of pocket."

== Criminal conviction ==
Marcus Richard Einfeld
- Status: Released on parole (19 March 2011)
- Convictions: Perjury (2008); Perverting the course of justice (2008)
- Criminal charges: Perjury; Perverting the course of justice
- Penalty: 3 years imprisonment; with a two-year non-parole period
- Comments: Revocation of commission as a Queen's Counsel (2008); Termination as an Officer of the Order of Australia (2009)

On 7 August 2006, Einfeld contested a A$77 speeding ticket. His car had been caught by a speed camera, traveling at 60 km/h in a 50 km/h zone (10 km/h (6.2 mph) over the speed limit) in the Sydney suburb of Mosman on 8 January 2006. The BBC noted: "the judge was only 6 mph over the limit, which scarcely made him a boy racer."

He contested the ticket in Downing Centre Local Court by claiming he had on that day lent his car to an old friend, Professor Teresa Brennan, who was visiting from the United States. By making his claim Einfeld was avoiding a A$77 fine, and avoiding gaining demerit points. He gave evidence under oath in the Local Court, and signed a statutory declaration to that effect, and the magistrate dismissed the charge as "not proved." However, a junior reporter for the Sydney daily tabloid The Daily Telegraph filed a brief story which caught the attention of assistant editor Michael Beach, who discovered that Brennan had died in the United States three years before Einfeld claimed she had been driving his car, and on Beach's instruction the reporter called Einfeld to obtain his reaction. This was the basis for Einfeld's later conviction for knowingly making a false statement under oath.

When challenged by the journalist concerning Brennan's death, Einfeld claimed that he had lent his car on that day to a different Terese or Therese Brennan, who he claimed also lived in the US, and who had also died after returning to the US. On 10 August 2006 a police investigation commenced into whether Einfeld had committed perjury in giving his evidence. On 23 August 2006, Einfeld produced a detailed 20-page statement describing the fictitious second Teresa Brennan and his supposed dealings with her. This was the basis for his conviction for attempting to pervert the course of justice.

Matters took an unusual turn when on 10 August 2006 Angela Liati, a 55-year-old Sydney woman unknown to Einfeld but who wanted to meet him, came forward and claimed that she had met Einfeld and had driven in his car with "Theahresa Brennan" (whom she had met on a meditation retreat) on a shopping expedition on the day in question. Liati said "He has given his life to good causes and has been a brilliant judge ... a brilliant man ... and he deserves all the respect a country will give him". Liati represented herself during an eight-day District Court jury trial and claimed that she was only endeavouring to make contact with Einfeld through her admission. However, she was found guilty on 12 February 2009 of perverting the course of justice and was subsequently sentenced to 200 hours' community service; later changed to a 12-month good behaviour bond.

On 29 March 2007, Einfeld was arrested by the New South Wales Police. He was initially charged by the Director of Public Prosecutions (New South Wales) with 13 offences, including perjury, perverting the course of justice, and making and using false statutory declarations. The charges had maximum penalties totalling 154 years in jail.

Einfeld's committal hearing was held in December 2007. The prosecution suggested the reason he lied under oath was that, had he gained the demerit points for the speeding offence, he would have been close to losing his licence. However, Einfeld denied he was aware his points were so high. One charge (hindering an investigation) was dropped. Einfeld was committed to stand trial on charges of perjury, perverting the course of justice, and traffic offences.

On 19 October 2008 the Court of Criminal Appeal dismissed another five of the charges against Einfeld, leaving only two.

On 31 October 2008, Einfeld pleaded guilty to the two remaining charges—to perjury, and to perverting the course of justice—just before his trial was to commence. It was also revealed that he had been battling prostate cancer for several months. The pre-sentence report to the court stated that Einfeld accepted responsibility for his actions. The head of the NSW Fraud Squad and commander of the Strike Force said its two-and-a-half-year investigation of the matter was "very lengthy, very protracted, very intricate". After his speeding fine case came to the attention of the Australian media, Einfeld was the subject of media reports alleging various other improprieties, including padding his curriculum vitae, purchasing doctorates from US diploma mills, and plagiarism.

On 20 March 2009, the 70-year-old retired judge Einfeld was sentenced to the maximum three years in prison for knowingly making a false statement under oath and for attempting to pervert the course of justice, with a non-parole period of two years. Supreme Court Justice Bruce James found Einfeld had committed "deliberate, premeditated perjury" that was "part of planned criminal activity". He served two years, and was released on parole on 19 March 2011.

=== Reactions ===
Einfeld said "I'm desperately sorry for what I did. I'm sorry to my family, my elderly mother and my children. I'm sorry to the public at large.... I lied. I can't say it any simpler than that. I told a lie, which was a disgraceful thing to do and for which I have been paying ever since." When Einfeld was asked if he was a dishonest man, he said: "No, I'm not dishonest, no... I don't think I'm the slightest bit dishonest. I just made a mistake."

On 5 November 2008, the President of the New South Wales Bar Association applied to the New South Wales Court of Appeal to withdraw Einfeld's commission as Queen's Counsel, on the basis that his conduct had brought shame upon the legal profession as well as on himself. On 26 November, Einfeld's commission as a Queen's Counsel was revoked. His membership of the Order of Australia was rescinded in April 2009.

NSW Law Society president Joe Catanzariti said that the three-year sentence for the former judge demonstrated that "the legal profession did not protect its own", but that it was tragic to see Einfeld's reputation ruined because "the sad thing in all of this is you do have a great man who has done great works, and ... the substantive thing that started it is so trivial." Reacting to a call to strip Einfeld of his pension, Chief Justice of New South Wales James Spigelman wrote in an April 2009 letter to NSW Attorney-General John Hatzistergos that pensions should be safe when judges were already retired, they were a deferred part of their salary, criminal law was sufficient punishment, and that it would be even more unusual if the offence "bears no relationship" to the judge's former duties. Spigelman continued that then-federal Attorney-General Robert McClelland and state attorneys-general should "impose a cooling off period on themselves" for reacting to vehement short-term ad hoc media campaigns."

Sydney barrister and author Charles Waterstreet observed: "at the time ... Einfeld wrote a false name for the driver ... at the heart of the sorry case ... the maximum, I repeat, the maximum fine for making a false declaration of that nature was $1,000." Former Australian Minister for Home Affairs, the Environment, and Arts Barry Cohen noted that:

"many journalists ... feel it is beholden upon them to mention that a person is Jewish, particularly if they have been naughty... He received three years in custody... By comparison ... a young lady living in Canberra got four years for killing her boyfriend. Shortly after Marcus Einfeld was sentenced, Stephen Linnell, one of the top advisers to Victoria police commissioner Christine Nixon, pleaded guilty to three counts of perjury and disclosing confidential information of the Office of Police Integrity. He received an eight-month suspended sentence and a $5,000 fine. The glaring difference between these crimes and the punishments incurred is extraordinary."

=== Removal from the roll ===
On 23 July 2009, the New South Wales Court of Appeal ordered that Einfeld's name be struck out from the roll of lawyers. On 28 August 2009, the Court of Appeal delivered its reasons for making those declarations and orders, finding proven allegations that, in addition to the 2006 statutory declaration in respect of which he had been convicted, Einfeld had also sworn a series of statutory declarations in 1999, 2003, and 2004 falsely nominating other persons as the drivers of his car who he knew had not been driving the car so as to avoid traffic infringements. Einfeld agreed not to apply for re-admission. The court also considered the circumstances in which Einfeld had produced the 20-page statement describing the fictitious Teresa Brennan, and found that:

This statement reflects a studied, careful and premeditated attempt through a series of direct lies to influence the outcome of the administration of justice. It involves not a passing mistake, not an unfortunate and apparently uncharacteristic lapse but a studied and deliberate attempt to avoid the consequences of his actions and to deflect and pervert the course of justice. It may well be that the course of justice was in relation to a minor matter, standing alone. That, however, is not the point... All these facts ... when taken as a whole reflect deeply on the character of the defendant. Some of his falsehoods were committed at a time when he held high judicial office in the administration of justice in this country. Some were committed when he held the position as a practitioner... These matters, having taken place over a period of some seven years ... reveal a clear unfitness to remain on the Roll of Local Lawyers.

== Later life ==
In 2011, Einfeld was devoting his time to community works, including working on Australian prison reform.

== Honours ==
- Queen's Counsel (QC): Letters Patent granted 1977. Revoked 26 November 2008.
- Officer of the Order of Australia (AO): June 1998, "for service to international affairs and to the promotion and protection of human rights". Terminated by the Governor-General on 24 April 2009.
- Australian Sports Medal: November 2000, as "Chairman of Fundraising Committee for 1988 Paralympic Team; President of APC 1990–1992". Subsequently terminated.
- Centenary Medal: January 2001, "for service to the Centenary of Federation celebrations".

== Literature ==
- Harari, Fiona (2011). A Tragedy in Two Acts: Marcus Einfeld and Teresa Brennan. Carlton: Melbourne University Publishing. ISBN 978-0-522-85810-5.
- Einfeld, Marcus (2001). A Bill of Rights for the Australian People. Debrett's Travel.
- Einfeld, Marcus (1985). Evidence Illegally and Improperly Obtained: Has the Pendulum Swung Too Far?. Seventh National Conference of Labor Lawyers.

Legal offices
New title	President of the Australian Human Rights and Equal Opportunity Commission; 1986–1990	Succeeded by Sir Ronald Wilson AC KBE CMG QC
Preceded by Sir Reginald Smithers	Justice of the Federal Court of Australia; 1986–2001	Succeeded by James Allsop
Preceded by	Additional Justice of the Supreme Court of the Australian Capital Territory; 1996–2001	Succeeded by
