= Ian Cohen =

Australian politician (born 1951)

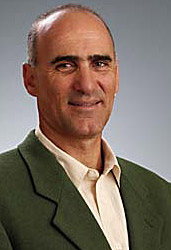

Member of the New South Wales Legislative Council
- In office 25 March 1995 – 4 March 2011

Personal details
- Born: 5 June 1951 (age 74)
- Party: Greens New South Wales
- Website: Ian Cohen MLC

Ian Cohen (born 5 June 1951) is a former Australian politician and member of the Greens New South Wales. Cohen was elected to the New South Wales Legislative Council in 1995 as its first Green member. He retired from parliament in 2011.

== Early life ==
After attending Fort Street High School, Cohen attended and graduated from the University of New South Wales with the degree of Bachelor of Arts (BA) and later earned a Graduate Diploma in Education (DipEd).

== Community activity ==
Cohen has organised and participated in many major environmental campaigns in Australia during the 1980s: Nightcap rainforests in Northern NSW, Franklin River, Daintree, South East forests NSW, North Washpool and Chaelundi. He has also participated in anti-nuclear campaigns including those at the Honeymoon and Roxby Downs uranium mines. Cohen's involvement in such campaigns was characterised by radical, front-line protest action; in the Franklin River Dam protest, for example, he opposed The Wilderness Society's decision to halt the up-river blockade in the period between the election of the anti-Dam Federal Labor government and the Australian High Court decision that ultimately saved the river.

Cohen was a founder of the Sydney Peace Squadron and the Brisbane Peace and Environment fleet and came to international attention in 1986 when photographed on a surfboard, while clinging to the bow of the destroyer USS Oldendorf (DD-972), as she pulled into Sydney Harbour to participate in the 75th Anniversary of the Royal Australian Navy. He was reported on ABC news as stating of the incident: "I think we sent a really strong message to the powers that be at that stage of the Cold War that there were Australians who objected strongly in a non-violent manner to the entry of nuclear warships into Sydney Harbour."

In 1989, Birch was interviewed by Caroline Jones on her Radio National program, The Search for Meaning.

== Political career ==
Cohen joined the Greens in 1984. He contested the Senate in 1984 and 1993. After contesting a seat in the state upper house in 1991, in March 1995 he was elected to the New South Wales Legislative Council as its first Green member. In September 1995, he was involved in organising a parliamentary delegation to protest against French nuclear testing in the Pacific.

In March 2003, he was re-elected to the NSW Legislative Council for a second 8-year term. He was involved, as a Member of the State Development Committee in Parliament, in enquiries into the Viability of Rural Towns, Sustainable Agriculture, and Fisheries, as well as looking into issues such as salinity. He also established the Genetic Engineering Committee to investigate Genetic Engineering in Agriculture. He has worked on a number of Joint Select Committees, undertaking a pioneering investigation into Medically Supervised Injecting Rooms, and investigating the Northside Sewerage Tunnel.

Cohen retired from parliament in 2011 and has since spoken out against the Boycott, Divestment and Sanctions campaign supported by some sections of the party and the party's decision not to preference the Labor Party at the 2011 state election.
