= Walkley Award for Outstanding Contribution to Journalism =

Australian journalism award

The Walkley Award for Outstanding Contribution to Journalism, formerly Walkley Award for Most Outstanding Contribution to Journalism, is one of the prestigious Australian Walkley Awards, and "recognises the achievements of a person or group for outstanding or enduring commitment to the highest standards of journalism and is chosen by the Walkley Directors".

It has been awarded annually since 1994.

== Winners ==
- 1994: Robert M. Duffield
- 1995: John Stubbs
- 1996: Max Fatchen
- 1997: Paul Chadwick
- 1998: Maurie Ferry, ABC South East Radio, Bega
- 1999: Tony Koch
- 2000: Paul Murphy
- 2001: Estelle Blackburn
- 2002: Quentin Dempster, The 7.30 Report, ABC TV
- 2003: Julie Duncan, Journalism Educator, South Australia
- 2004: Phil Wilkins
- 2005: Australian Cartoonist's Association
- 2006: Colleen Egan, The Sunday Times
- 2007: Gerard Noonan
- 2008: Pamela Bone
- 2009: Tony Stephens
- 2010: Cameron Forbes
- 2011: WikiLeaks
- 2012: Peter Cave
- 2013: Caroline Jones
- 2014: Peter Greste
- 2015: Trevor Sykes
- 2016: Bruce Petty
- 2017: Michael Gordon
- 2018: Sean Dorney
- 2019: Sue Spencer
- 2020: Ross Gittins
- 2021: George Negus
- 2022: Sally Neighbour
