= The Search for Meaning (radio program) =

The Search for Meaning was an Australian national weekly radio program, hosted by Caroline Jones and broadcast on ABC Radio National, aired from 1987 to 1994.

In 1988 The Search for Meaning became Radio National's most popular evening program.

The program featured Jones interviewing prominent and interesting Australians about how they make sense of their lives, while pioneering a new non-combative ‘confessional’ interview technique.

== Conception ==
In 1968, Jones had become the first female reporter in Australian television current affairs when she began working for This Day Tonight at the ABC. In 1972 she became the first female presenter on ABC's Four Corners, where she remained until 1981. During this period she was also on ABC radio's City Extra.

In 1985 Jones converted to Catholicism, where it was said her own personal search for meaning began.

With these experiences behind her, in 1987 Jones created The Search for Meaning, the same year in which she was awarded the United Nations Media Peace Prize. She wanted to produce something totally different, and pioneered a new non-combative interview technique, described as ‘confessional’.

== Format ==
The Search for Meaning was a weekly radio program which aired on Sunday afternoons.

It explored intimate themes such as death and grief and spirituality in everyday life, in longform interviews (often well over 30 minutes) conducted by Jones. In it, Jones pioneered a new interviewing technique, away from the conventional ‘adversarial’ approach of hard-hitting television current affairs to what was characterised as ‘confessional’, in which hundreds of Australians told intimate stories of their lives and their spiritual or personal development through those experiences. "If we can hear each other," she said, "we can hear the common threads of humanity."

It has been suggested that radio suited the confessional style more than television would, where key revelations were made as a result of the intimiate interaction between interviewer and interviewee.

The program was much-loved and highly original, in which Jones told, or made space for others to tell, the life histories, and interior landscapes, of individual people. Jones claimed the show became so successful because the life experience of the interviewee and the listener resonated.

Jones said: "The Search for Meaning was a revelation to me, just to see the power of the story telling; how it helped people right across the country to know each other better. And as they listened they were affirmed that it was all right to think about what really matters in life. I saw that the telling of personal stories was more powerful and valuable than anything I had yet encountered in journalism."

== Ending ==
The program was taken off Radio National in 1994 after 8 years.

After 8 years, ABC General Manager Peter Manning wanted Jones to be more intrusive. Jones refused, saying “I explained that I had developed The Search for Meaning interviews to be revelations of the soul and psyche, that they were produced by deep listening and facilitation, not with a scalpel”. Hundreds of letters resulted. Jones felt that the program was removed for “no intelligent reason” and in the face of hard evidence to the contrary.

== Legacy ==
Search for Meaning became the inspiration for Australian Story, which Jones presented and contributed to since its launch in May 1996.

== Selected guests ==
Guests interviewed were all prominent and interesting Australians, and ranged from former prime ministers, scientists, environmentalists, poets to artists' models.

Guests included:

- Phillip Adams – journalist
- Charles Birch – biologist
- Barb Blackman – artist
- Burnum Burnum – Aboriginal storyteller
- Helen Caldicott – Dr, nuclear disarmament campaigner
- Nick Carroll – surfer, writer
- Ian Cohen – peace and environment activist
- Marcus Einfeld – judge
- Dr Ron Farmer – clinical psychologist
- Paul Field – lead singer with Cockroaches
- John Foulcher – poet, English teacher
- Ian Gawler – author, therapist
- Kevin Gilbert – Aboriginal poet
- Jim Glennon – Anglican Cannon
- Jeremy Griffith – biologist and author
- Sir John Gorton – Prime Minister
- Robert Hanbury Brown – astronomer and physicist
- Sir James Hardy – businessman and sailer
- Robert A. Johnson – psychologist, studied with Jung
- Justice Jim Macken – jurist
- Anka Makovec – nurse, artist, wilderness guide
- Reverend Hugh Murray – priest and poet
- Pyotr Patrushev – Russian born writer and translator
- Florence Spurling – broadcaster
- Dr Paolo Totaro – cultural activist
- Tom Uren – politician
- Jo Vallentine – Senator, nuclear disarmament advocate

== See also ==
- The Search for Meaning (1989) ISBN 978-0642128645
- The Search for Meaning Book 2 (1990) ISBN 9780-733300097
- The Search for Meaning Conversations with Caroline Jones (1992) ISBN 978-0733301346
- The Search for Meaning Collection (1995) ISBN 978-0733304477
- An Authentic Life: Finding Meaning and Spirituality in Everyday Life (2005) ISBN 978-0733316609
