= Presumed Guilty =

Presumed Guilty may refer to:

== Film and television ==
- Presumed Guilty (film), a 2008 Mexican documentary film
- Presumed Guilty, a 2002 PBS documentary about the San Francisco Public Defender's office
- "Presumed Guilty", an episode of the TV series CSI: Miami that aired on February 9, 2009

== Literature ==
- Presumed Guilty: The Tragedy of the Rodney King Affair, a 1992 book by Stacey Koon
- Presumed Guilty: British Legal System Exposed, a 1993 book by Michael Mansfield and Tony Wardle
- Presumed Guilty, a 1993 romantic suspense novel by Tess Gerritsen
- Presumed Guilty: Brian Mulroney, the Airbus Affair, and the Government of Canada, a 1998 book by William Kaplan
- Presumed Guilty: When Cops get it Wrong and Courts Seal the Deal, a 2013 non-fiction book by Bret Christian
- Presumed guilty, 2025 legal thriller by Scott Turrow
