= Jeremy Griffith =

Australian biologist and author (born 1945)

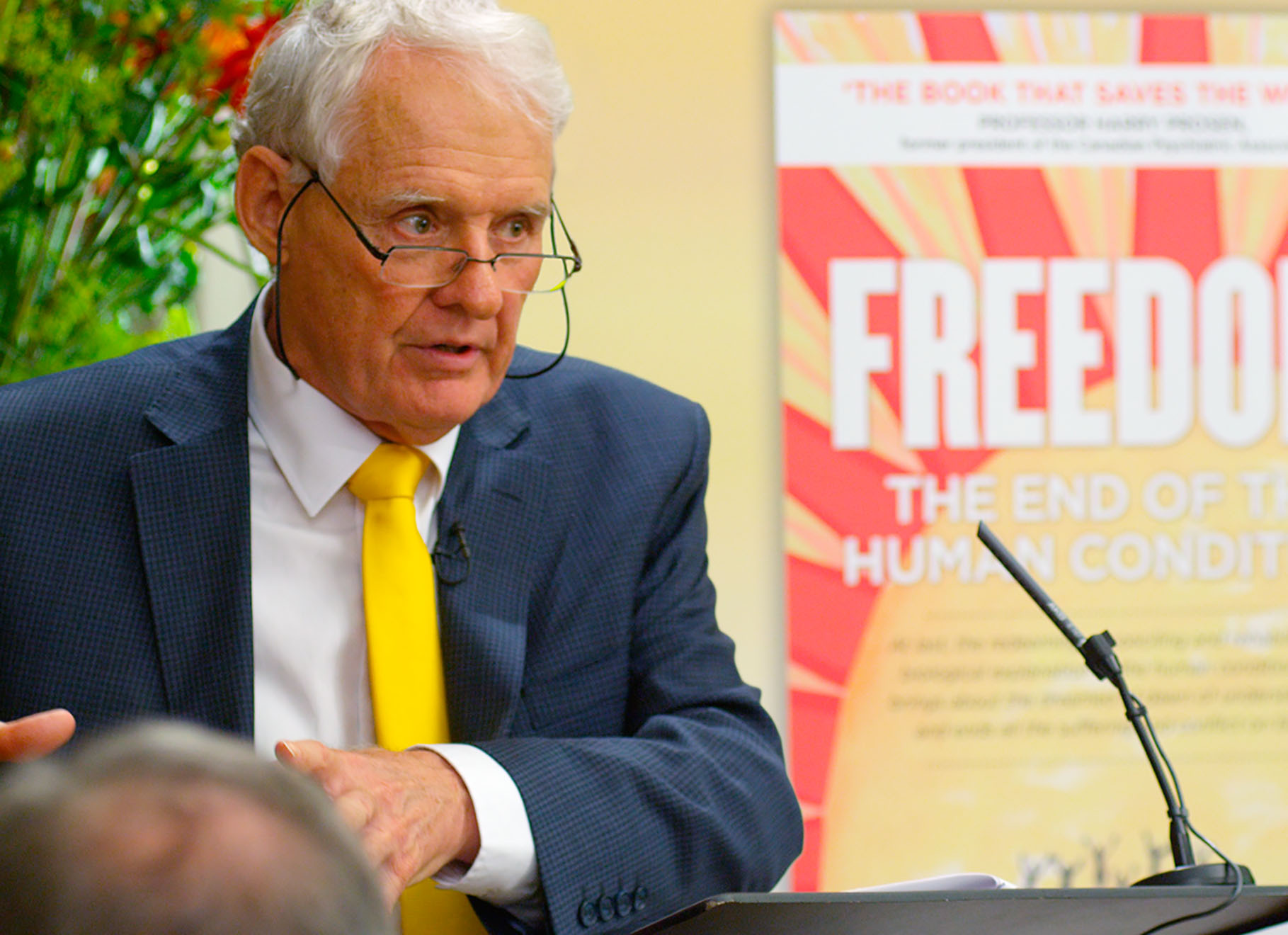
- Griffith launching his book Freedom at the Royal Geographical Society, London. 2 June 2016
- Born: 1945 (age 80–81)
- Citizenship: Australian
- Education: University of Sydney
- Occupation: Author
- Years active: 1967–present
- Organization: Fix The World
- Known for: Treatise on the human condition
- Notable work: Freedom: The End Of The Human Condition
- Website: www.jeremygriffith.com

Jeremy Griffith (born 1945) is an Australian author. He first came to public attention for his attempts to find the Tasmanian tiger. He later became noted for his writings on the human condition and theories about human progress, which seek to give a biological, rational explanation of human behaviour. He founded the not-for-profit Fix The World in 1983.

== Early life and career ==
Griffith was raised on a sheep property in central New South Wales. He was educated at Tudor House School, New South Wales, and the Geelong Grammar School, Victoria, in 1965 completing the NSW Higher School Leaving Certificate with first class honours in biology. He began a science degree at the University of New England, in northern New South Wales, and completed his Bachelor of Science degree in zoology at the University of Sydney in 1971.

=== Search for the Tasmanian Tiger ===
Griffith first became known for his search for surviving Tasmanian tigers, or thylacines, the last known specimen of which had died in captivity in 1936. The search was conducted from 1967 to 1973. It is considered the most intensive search to that point, and included exhaustive surveys along Tasmania's west coast, installation of automatic camera stations, prompt investigations of claimed sightings, and in 1972 the creation of the Thylacine Expeditionary Research Team with Bob Brown. It concluded without finding any evidence of the animal's continuing existence, despite numerous claimed ongoing sightings. Griffith's search was the subject of an episode of ABC TV's A Big Country; and his report of the search was published in Natural History.

Some ten years later the thylacine was declared extinct by the International Union for Conservation of Nature in 1982 and by the Tasmanian government in 1986.

=== Furniture business ===
After returning from his search for the thylacine, Griffith started a furniture business, Griffith Tablecraft, with his brother Gervase. The business made simple furniture out of solid slabs of wood without use of nails or glue. Griffith left the company in 1990 and it was ultimately sold in 2002.

== On human nature, the human condition, and progress ==
Griffith began writing on the human condition in 1975. His books seek to give a biological and rational explanation of human behaviour and include references to philosophical and religious sources.

His first book on the subject, Free: The End of the Human Condition, was published in 1988, and Griffith was interviewed by Caroline Jones on her Radio National program, The Search for Meaning. A Species In Denial (2003) became a bestseller in Australia and New Zealand. 'Freedom': The End of the Human Condition (2016) has been described as the definitive presentation of his treatise.

In support of his theory, he cites from a broad selection of sources, including many thinkers he regards as "unevasive" or "contemporary prophets", including James Darling, Charles Darwin, Sigmund Freud, Carl Jung, Thomas Huxley, Stephen Hawking and Laurens van der Post.

Griffith explains human nature (what he terms the human condition) by proposing that as consciousness emerged in our hominid ancestors, the intellect's experiments in self-management were in effect criticised by our pre-established instincts, the result of which was that humans unavoidably became increasingly "angry, egocentric and alienated".

According to psychologist Ronald Conway, Griffith holds that we are at war with our own selves, causing humanity to become alienated from its original peaceful state of innocence. Griffith says that this war within is the cause of ongoing actual wars and the general lack of cooperation in the world. Griffith analyses the scientific literature in human evolution; rejects claims that human ancestors were brutal and aggressive; and instead points to fossil evidence such as that of Ardipithecus ramidus, and primatological studies of bonobos in support of his thesis that ancient humans were a gentle, loving and co-operative species.

In a 2020 article "The fury of the left, explained", published in The Spectator Australia, Griffith argued that the ideology of the Left is dangerous to humanity's progress. He describes left-wing views as regressive and likely to lead to extinction.

== Fix The World ==
Fix The World was founded by Griffith in 1983 as the Centre for Humanity's Adulthood, an organisation dedicated to developing and promoting understanding of the human condition. It was incorporated in 1990 with Griffith and his colleague, mountaineer Tim Macartney-Snape, among its founding directors and became a registered charity in New South Wales in 1990, known as the Foundation for Humanity's Adulthood. In 2009, its name changed to the World Transformation Movement and then to Fix The World in 2026.

== Reception ==
A reviewer of Griffith's book A Species in Denial described its thesis as "humanity is in denial about the loss of its innocence in a corrupt and broken world", and believed it would have benefited from including discussion of the works of Martin Buber, H. Richard Niebuhr, Lawrence Kohlberg and James W. Fowler, who also examine the moral stages of human growth.

Some reviewers described A Species in Denial as challenging or “a difficult book to read, but through the repetition of his concepts the reader finally grasps Griffith’s meaning and, surprisingly, when this happens all kinds of questions arise, which is refreshing". Conway wrote "A Species In Denial needs repeated reading, not because it is particularly difficult but because it goes against so much of the resigned don't-rock-the-boat attitude of the Western mind in particular."

One reviewer criticised Griffith's analysis of the anthropological data to support the notion that humanity had a cooperative past, highlighting his reliance on the writings of controversial figures, like the South African philosopher Sir Laurens van der Post, and !Kung Bushman researcher Elizabeth Marshall Thomas.

It has also been suggested that despite agreeing with the broad thrust of Griffith's thesis, some will disagree with his high opinion of the Scottish psychiatrist R. D. Laing.

=== Media coverage and legal proceedings ===
In 1995, Griffith, Macartney-Snape and the Foundation for Humanity's Adulthood (Fix The World's name at the time) were the subject of an Australian Broadcasting Corporation (ABC) Four Corners programme and an article in the Sydney Morning Herald (SMH) newspaper in which it was alleged that Macartney-Snape used speaking appearances at schools to promote the foundation, and that Griffith "publishes work of such a poor standard that it has no support at all from the scientific community". In defamation actions against the ABC and the SMH, the allegations were ruled to be false and the pieces defamatory.

In 1998, following a complaint by Griffith and Macartney-Snape, the Australian Broadcasting Authority censured the ABC for unbalanced and inaccurate reporting and breaching the ABC code of practice, with The Bulletin describing the Four Corners programme as a "hatchet job" (another term for a "hit piece").

Griffith, Macartney-Snape and Fix The World sued the ABC and the Sydney Morning Herald in the NSW Supreme Court and both publications were found to be defamatory. In 2008, the ABC was ordered to pay Macartney-Snape almost $500,000 in damages, and with costs, the payout was expected to exceed $1 million. While the jury found that what the ABC said about Griffith was defamatory, the judge dismissed the case after the defences of truth, qualified privilege and comment were considered. Griffith appealed that decision to the New South Wales Court of Appeal, which dismissed the appeal on the basis of qualified privilege and comment being upheld, but found that the defamatory allegation about Griffith was not justified. The court case against the Sydney Morning Herald was resolved in 2009 when it published an apology to Fix The World for the harm caused by the publication.

== Selected works ==
=== Books ===
- Death by Dogma: The Biological Reason Why the Left Is Leading Us to Extinction, and the Solution. WTM Publishing & Communications Pty Ltd. 2021. ISBN 978-1-74129-066-0.
- Freedom: The End of The Human Condition. WTM Publishing & Communications Pty Ltd. 2016. ISBN 978-1-74129-028-8.
- The Book of Real Answers to Everything!. WTM Publishing & Communications Pty Ltd. 2011. ISBN 978-1-74129-007-3.
- A Species in Denial. WTM Publishing & Communications Pty Ltd. 2003. ISBN 978-1-74129-001-1.
- Beyond the Human Condition. WTM Publishing & Communications Pty Ltd. 1991. ISBN 978-0-646-03994-7.
- Free: The End of the Human Condition. WTM Publishing & Communications Pty Ltd. 1988. ISBN 0-7316-0495-4.

=== Monographs ===
- THE Interview. WTM Publishing & Communications Pty Ltd. 2020. ISBN 978-1-74129-056-1.
- Transform Your Life and Save the World: Through Living in Support of The Biological Truth About the Human Condition. WTM Publishing & Communications Pty Ltd. 2016. ISBN 978-1-74129-035-6.
