= Pyotr Patrushev =

Russian Author

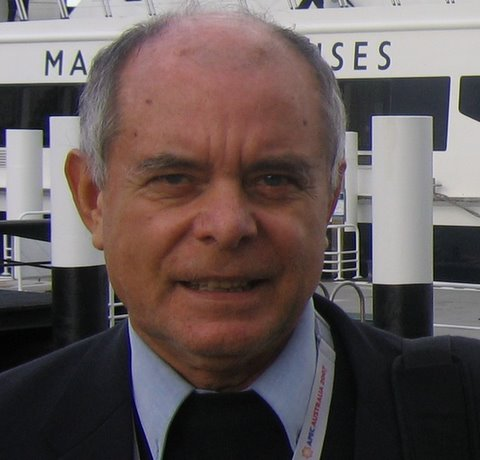
- Born: Pyotr Egorovich Patrushev; 26 May 1942; Kolpashevo, Tomsk Oblast, USSR
- Died: 28 March 2016 (aged 73); Jervis Bay Village, Australia
- Occupations: Journalist, broadcaster, interpreter, translator

Pyotr Egorovich Patrushev (Russian: Пётр Егорович Патрушев; 26 May 1942 – 28 March 2016) was a Russian author who escaped the Soviet Union by swimming to Turkey across the Black Sea border in 1962.

== Early life and education ==
Patrushev was born in Kolpashevo, Tomsk Oblast, on 26 May 1942. His father, Egor Grigorievich Patrushev was a Second World War soldier who was killed in action one month before Patrushev's birth. His mother, Marina Vasilievna Leschina raised him and his two siblings after the death of their father.

Patrushev trained at a college in Tomsk as a competitive swimmer. A backstroke champion, he participated in competitions in Moscow and other cities around Russia. His swimming skill came with prestige and food coupons. Prior to leaving Russia, Patrushev was training for the 1964 Summer Olympics.

Patrushev graduated from college and was attempting to enroll in university, however, he and his swimming trainer were targeted by Shkolnik, the director of the Tomsk swimming centre. Shkolnik was a former associate of Lavrentiy Beria, who had been exiled to Siberia after Beria's execution. Shkolnik contacted the KGB in Novosibirsk who forced him into the military.

== Military career and escape from Russia ==
In the military, he was targeted for hazing by a sergeant in his army unit and feigned mental illness to avoid death or maiming.

In June 1962, he escaped the military and traveled 4,000 kilometers by train to Batumi, located near the border with Turkey. Due to the potential difficulty in crossing the border by land, he swam 35 kilometers across the Black Sea to Turkey. Fearing that Patrushev was a Soviet spy, Turkey detained him to investigate, where he spent a year in prison until his release. He was sentenced to death for treason in absentia by the Soviet government for his escape and was on the KGB's wanted list for 27 years.

== Life in Australia ==
In 1964, he was granted a residence permit in Australia. Patrushev became a broadcaster, journalist, conference interpreter and translator in the West, working for the BBC in London and later for the Radio Liberty in Munich and San Francisco, as well as writing for Australian newspapers, radio and television. He has worked as a Senior Consultant, CIS and Eastern Europe for (Chatswood-based) Conflict Resolution Network. As a top level Russian translator and interpreter he was a member of AIIC, the International Association of Conference Interpreters and the National Accreditation Authority for Translators and Interpreters. He interpreted for Russian and Australian Heads of State i.e. (Vladimir Putin, John Howard), Prime Ministers, Members of the Cabinet, etc.

Patrushev's commentaries in the Sydney Morning Herald and on the national radio and television established him as one of the pre-eminent commentators on Soviet and Russian affairs. His work as an interpreter with American and Russian scientists in the 80’s and 90’s in the areas of brain/mind interaction provided him with a wealth of material for his book Project Nirvana.

During this period, Patrushev was interviewed by Caroline Jones on her Radio National program, The Search for Meaning.

Reportedly, when Patrushev visited his native Soviet Union in 1990 for the first time in 28 years - "the country which, only a few weeks before his return, overturned the death penalty imposed on him for his dramatic escape abroad all those years ago" - he was taken away by guards and detained for more than eight hours when he first arrived at Moscow Airport. He had made the trip to visit relatives, mainly in his native Siberia, and make contacts for the network, which teaches conflict resolution skills under the auspices of the United Nations Association of Australia. Although both Soviet and Australian authorities had assured Patrushev that it was safe for him to travel to the Soviet Union on his Australian passport, he was still detained, "most of the time in a hot and stuffy airport hotel, without being able to contact the Australian Embassy or his waiting relatives." He was freed with no explanation, except that of the hotel manager who commented: "See, perestroika is working."

== Death ==
He died on 28 March 2016 after suffering a stroke. Until his death, he lived in Jervis Bay, in the state of New South Wales, Australia, with his wife and son.

== Bibliography ==
- Sentenced to Death. St. Petersburg: Neva, 2005 (in Russian) by Pyotr Patrushev.
- Project Nirvana: How the Cold War Was Won. Booksurge, 2005. ISBN 1-4196-1179-8 by Pyotr Patrushev.
