= Sean Dorney =

Australian journalist

Sean Dorney AO MBE CSM FAIIA
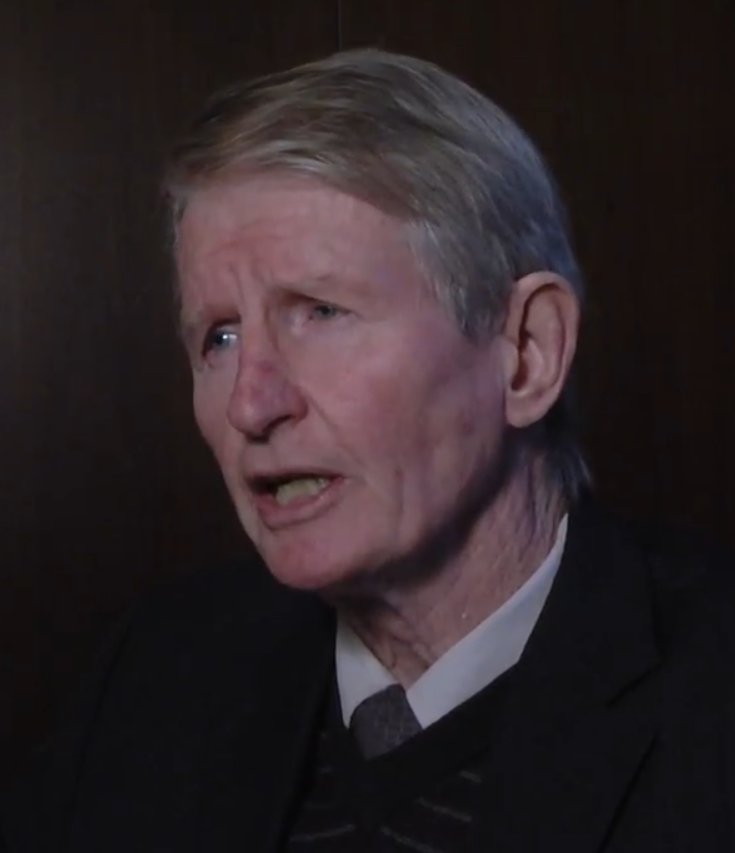
- Dorney in 2015
- Born: 8 March 1951 (age 75); Townsville, Queensland, Australia
- Education: James Cook University
- Occupations: Foreign correspondent, journalist
- Notable credit: Australian Broadcasting Corporation
- Spouse: Pauline Nare (m. 1976)

Sean Christopher Dorney (born 8 March 1951) is an Australian journalist, foreign correspondent, and writer with an extensive career covering the Pacific with a particular focus on Papua New Guinea. He was the Pacific and PNG Correspondent of the Australian Broadcasting Corporation on and off from 1975 to 2014.

== Early life and education ==
Born in 1951, Dorney was brought up in a strong Catholic household in Townsville, the fourth of six children. His father was a surgeon who served with the Australian Army during the Second World War including in Papua New Guinea.

He then attended St Joseph's Nudgee College in Brisbane from 1964 to 1968 and then studied economics at James Cook University in 1969 to 1970.

== Professional career ==
Dorney was an editor of the James Cook University student newspaper which secured him a cadetship at the Australian Broadcasting Corporation. He then worked at the former National Broadcasting Commission in Port Moresby.

In 1984, Dorney was deported by the Papua New Guinea Government for his role in the Four Corners interview of James Nyaro, a West Papuan rebel commander fighting the Indonesian Government.

In 1985, Dorney left the Australian Broadcasting Corporation to work as a press secretary in the Northern Territory Government for 18 months.

In 2009, Dorney was deported from Fiji for his reporting on Frank Bainimarama's abrogation of the country's constitution.

Dorney was made redundant in 2014 after the Australian government cut funding to the Australia Network international broadcasting service.

Dorney served as an election monitor with the Commonwealth Observer Group during the 2017 Papua New Guinean general election.

He is a Nonresident Fellow of the Lowy Institute for International Policy.

== Rugby career ==
Dorney played halfback for James Cook University and later the Brisbane Wests Rugby.

Dorney was a member of the Papua New Guinea national rugby league team in 1975 and 1976 including serving as its captain in his last game in 1976.

== Awards and recognition ==
Dorney was awarded a Member of the Order of the British Empire in 1990 by the Papua New Guinean Government for his reporting on the Sandline affair.

He won a Walkley Award for his coverage of the Aitape tsunami in 1998. Also in 1998, the Pacific Islands News Association awarded Dorney Pacific Media Freedom Award.

Dorney was recognised as a Member of the Order of Australia in 2000 for "For service to journalism as a foreign correspondent".

The Australian Council for International Development awarded Dorney their inaugural Media Award in October 2012.

In 2018 he was awarded a Walkley Award for Most Outstanding Contribution to Journalism.

Dorney was recognised as a Fellow of the Australian Institute of International Affairs in November 2018.

In April 2019, the Walkley Foundation created "The Sean Dorney Grant for Pacific Journalism" which gives a reporter in the Pacific region up to $10,000 to cover a project the reporter has in mind.

In 2019, the Government of Papua New Guinea recognised Dorney as a Companion of the Star of Melanesia.

In the 2020 Queen's Birthday Honours, Dorney was appointed an Officer of the Order of Australia for "distinguished service to Australia-PNG relations".

== Personal life ==
Dorney married Pauline Nare, a radio journalist from Manus Island, in 1976. He was diagnosed with motor neurone disease in 2017.

== Published books ==
- Papua New Guinea: People, Politics and History since 1975 (1990)
- The Sandline Affair: Politics and Mercenaries and the Bougainville Crisis (1998)
- The Embarrassed Colonialist (2016)
