= Teresa Brennan =

American philosopher (1952-2003)

Teresa Brennan (January 5, 1952 – February 3, 2003) was an Australian feminist philosopher and psychoanalytic theorist best known for her posthumous book, The Transmission of Affect (2004). Before her death, Brennan was Schmidt Distinguished Professor of the Humanities at Florida Atlantic University, where she founded a PhD program for Public Intellectuals.

== Education and career ==
Brennan graduated with a BA from the University of Sydney and an MA in political theory from the University of Melbourne. Before her PhD at King's College, Cambridge, Brennan trained as a psychoanalyst at the Tavistock Clinic in London. She taught at The New School, Brandeis University, and Harvard University, and finally as Schmidt Distinguished Professor of Humanities at Florida Atlantic University.

While at Florida Atlantic University from 1998 to 2002, Brennan designed a PhD for Public Intellectuals, intended for training not only scholars but curators and archivists, organizers, and environmentalists.

== Publications ==
Brennan's first two books, Interpretations of the Flesh: Freud and Femininity and History After Lacan, are works of psychoanalytic social theory, while Exhausting Modernity: Grounds for a New Economy and Globalization and Its Terrors draw on Marxist and ecofeminist theories to consider large-scale energetic draining. Her posthumous The Transmission of Affect engages physiological and psychosocial research that challenges the causal framework of sociobiology, with examples such as stress, psychological projection, the introjection of aggression, and the energizing and draining of social interactions.

In addition to these five books, Brennan edited two volumes: Between Feminism and Psychoanalysis and, with co-editor Martin Jay, Vision in Context: Historical and Contemporary Perspectives on Sight. She was General Editor with Susan James of the Oxford Readings in Feminism series, an extension of Oxford Readings in Philosophy, and also General Editor for the Routledge series Opening Out: Feminism for Today.

Brennan's colleagues contributed to a posthumous volume on her work Living Attention: On Teresa Brennan. Her papers are housed in the John Hay Library at Brown University, part of the Pembroke Center for Teaching and Research on Women's Feminist Theory Archive. In 2017, the philoSOPHIA annual conference honored Brennan at Florida Atlantic University, with a keynote by Sara Ahmed.

== Death ==
She died of injuries from a hit and run car crash in 2003. Marcus Einfeld, an Australian judge, appealed a speeding ticket in 2006 by claiming that he lent his car to her. The discrepancy eventually led to his conviction and imprisonment.
