= Peter Cave =

Australian journalist

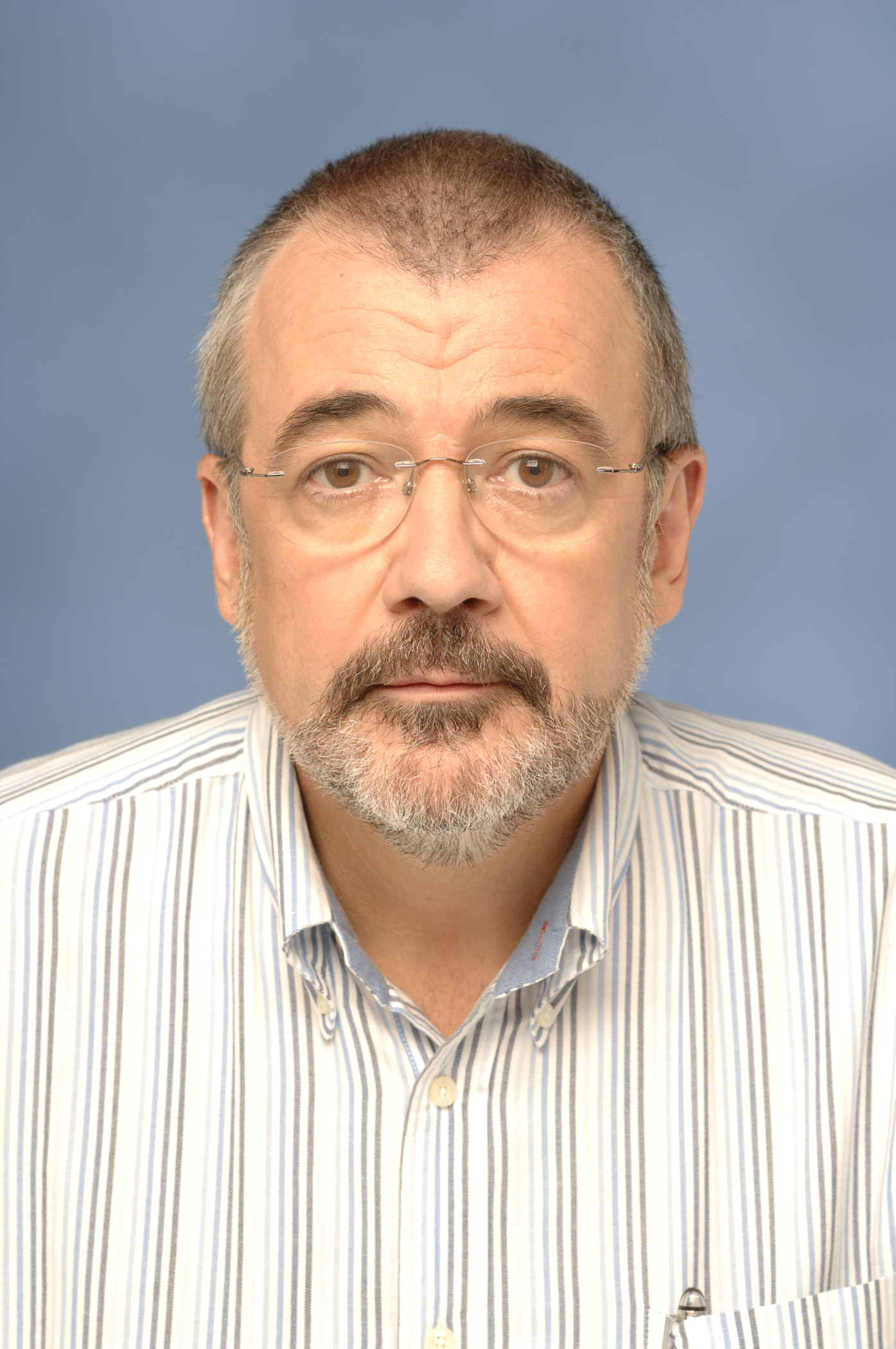
- Born: 1952 (age 73–74); Newcastle, New South Wales
- Citizenship: Australian
- Education: Newcastle Boys High School
- Occupation: Foreign editor / journalist
- Years active: 1971–2012
- Employer: In retirement

Peter Cave (born 1952) is an Australian journalist. He retired as Foreign Affairs Editor for the Australian Broadcasting Corporation in July 2012.

== Early life and education ==
Peter Cave was born in 1952 in Newcastle, New South Wales. He grew up in Waratah West as one of four children of Frederick David and Betty Cave. His father was an industrial galvaniser and his mother was a nurse.

He attended Newcastle Boys High School.

== Career ==
At 18 he gained a cadetship with the then Australian Broadcasting Commission in Sydney. By 1974 he was working for Macquarie National News when he was flown into Darwin to cover the aftermath of Cyclone Tracy.

He then re-joined the ABC where his first major international assignment was the Coconut War in The New Hebrides. His first overseas posting was to Japan (1983–1986).

He later became the chief correspondent for Europe and the Middle East based in London (1987–1992) and then bureau chief in Washington (1996–97).

He returned to Australia to be the presenter of AM (ABC Radio) before becoming Foreign Affairs Editor.

In his career with the ABC he has also reported on the end of apartheid in South Africa, the Palestinian intifada in the Occupied Territories, glasnost and perestroika in the former Soviet Union, the break-up of the former Yugoslavia and wars in Slovenia, Croatia, Bosnia, Kosovo and Lebanon, two Gulf wars, the fall of President Suharto in Indonesia, the civil unrest in East Timor, the first Bali Bombing, three Fijian Coups, the troubles in Northern Ireland, the 2011 Egyptian revolution, the 2011 Libyan civil war. and the uprising in Syria.

Peter has helped his fellow foreign correspondents with trauma training and peer support. He "helped pioneer the ABC's groundbreaking peer trauma support scheme." In 2009 he was awarded an Ochberg Fellowship by the Dart Center for Journalism and Trauma attending the Atlanta, Georgia fellowship meeting and the International Society for Traumatic Stress Studies conference.

== Walkley Awards ==
Cave has won six Walkley Awards, Australian journalism's most prestigious accolades.

=== 1989 Awards ===
Cave was an ABC Radio reporter in Beijing in June 1989. Cave had been there for about a month interviewing the students, intellectuals and labour activists and had filed reports on "two half-hearted attempts" by the military to disperse the demonstrators and had a room with a balcony overlooking Beijing's Tiananmen Square. He has later said: "Just about everyone else had decided it was over and packed up," when at "about one in the morning I got a phone call from a colleague who had seen them run over a couple of people. I pulled back the blinds and saw an armoured personnel carrier go up and over a barricade and kill two people on bikes." With gunfire in the background he reported on the Tiananmen Square massacre. Cave won two awards for his reporting: the best radio news report award and the currents affairs award. Cave was "commended for outstanding journalism under particularly difficult circumstances".

=== 1990 Award ===
Cave was the London-based European correspondent for the ABC when he reported from Berlin on the fall of the Berlin Wall. His coverage won him his third Walkley, this time for best news report.

=== 2004 Awards ===
Cave was on assignment in Iraq for the ABC on the outskirts of Baghdad when he, his cameraman, Michael Cox, and the driver and translator, were ordered by armed masked men to approach their car: in the back seat was an American hostage, Thomas Hamill a civilian truck driver. "The only thing that saved us was the quick thinking of our fixer, who told them we were Russians so they'd use us for propaganda rather than as hostages." Cave was allowed to speak to Hamill and the resulting report was an international exclusive; Michael Moore used some of the footage in Fahrenheit 9/11. Cave won two Walkley Awards for the story: one for the radio news report, another for his television news report .

=== 2012 Award ===
Walkley Award for Most Outstanding Contribution to Journalism

== Family life ==
Peter is married and has two adult sons.
