= Ronald Wilson =

Australian judge and church leader

The Honourable Sir Ronald Wilson AC KBE CMG QC

28th Justice of the High Court of Australia
- In office 21 May 1979 – 13 February 1989
- Nominated by: Malcolm Fraser
- Preceded by: Sir Kenneth Jacobs
- Succeeded by: Michael McHugh

President of the Human Rights and Equal Opportunity Commission
- In office 1990–1997
- Preceded by: Marcus Einfeld
- Succeeded by: Alice Tay

Personal details
- Born: Ronald Darling Wilson; 23 August 1922 Geraldton, Western Australia
- Died: 15 July 2005 (aged 82) Perth, Western Australia
- Spouse: Lady Leila Wilson (née Smith)
- Children: 3 sons; 2 daughters
- Education: University of Western Australia; University of Pennsylvania
- Occupation: Judge and social activist
- Profession: Jurist and lawyer

Military service
- Allegiance: Australia
- Branch/service: Royal Australian Air Force
- Rank: Flying Officer
- Battles/wars: World War II

Sir Ronald Darling Wilson (23 August 1922 – 15 July 2005) was a distinguished Australian lawyer, judge and social activist serving on the High Court of Australia between 1979 and 1989 and as the President of the Human Rights and Equal Opportunity Commission between 1990 and 1997.

Wilson is probably best known as the co-author with Mick Dodson of the 1997 Bringing Them Home report into the Stolen Generation which led to the creation of a National Sorry Day and a walk for reconciliation across the Sydney Harbour Bridge in 2000 with an estimated 250,000–300,000 people participating. Wilson was also one of three judges sitting on The WA Inc Royal Commission in the early 1990s which eventually led to former Premier Brian Burke being jailed in March 1997.

== Early life and academic background ==
Wilson was born in Geraldton, in Western Australia (WA) on 23 August 1922. His early life was marked by sorrow and hardship. When he was four years old his mother died. At the age of seven his father, also a lawyer, suffered a stroke and spent the next five years in a hospice. His older brother became a father figure to him and for years the family faced financial struggles. At the age of 14, Wilson left formal schooling and took his first job as a messenger with the Geraldton Local Court.

In September 1941, following the outbreak of World War II, Wilson enlisted in the army reserve, which was known at the time as the Militia (service no. W46518) and was posted to the 44th Battalion. The battalion was part of a Special Mobile Force stationed in coastal areas between Perth and Geraldton, to respond in the event of an attack by Japanese forces.

Transferring to the Royal Australian Air Force (RAAF) in July 1942, Wilson (service no. 427404) received pilot training under the Empire Air Training Scheme, and was posted to the UK, for operations with Royal Air Force (RAF) formations. At the end of the war he was serving with No. 287 Squadron RAF, an anti-aircraft cooperation unit (i.e. it assisted in the training of anti-aircraft gunners). Wilson flew Spitfires, among other types of aircraft. He was discharged from the RAAF on 14 February 1946, with the rank of Flying Officer.

After returning to Australia, Wilson enrolled in the University of Western Australia finishing with a law degree in 1949. He later completed a Master of Laws degree at the University of Pennsylvania in 1957, as a Fulbright scholar.

== Early legal career ==
Wilson was admitted as a barrister and solicitor in 1951. He had a rapid rise in his legal career, becoming Crown Prosecutor for Western Australia in 1959, only eight years after starting work as a lawyer. In 1963, he was admitted as a Queen's Counsel, at the time, the youngest ever in Western Australia. As a prosecutor, Wilson earned the nickname of the "Avenging Angel".

In 2002 and 2005, two men whom Wilson had prosecuted for murder have had their convictions overturned: John Button, who was convicted in 1963 of the manslaughter of his girlfriend Rosemary Anderson had his conviction overturned by the Western Australian Court of Appeal. Darryl Beamish who had been convicted of the 1959 murder of Jillian Brewer had his conviction overturned in 2005. Perth serial killer, Eric Edgar Cooke, confessed to both offences before he was hanged for other murders, but was not believed by authorities. The convictions were eventually overturned in 2002.

In 1969, Wilson became the Solicitor-General of Western Australia. He served in that position for ten years working under both Labor and Liberal governments.

== High Court Justice, 1979-1989 ==
The Fraser Government appointed Wilson to the High Court of Australia in 1979 and was the first member of the Court from Western Australia. Wilson adopted a federalist position on the court; and was frequently in the minority on issues relating to the scope of the Commonwealth's external affairs legislative power.

In Koowarta v Bjelke-Petersen, Wilson was in the minority in holding that the external affairs power in the Australian constitution applied only to relationships outside Australia. The majority of the High Court found that the treaty need only apply to issues of clear international concern. The majority held the Federal Parliament had the power to pass the Racial Discrimination Act 1975 as a result of Australia being a signatory to the Convention on the Elimination of All Forms of Racial Discrimination.

In Commonwealth v Tasmania, the external affairs power was again the central issue. The new Hawke Government had used the external affairs power as the basis for passing legislation preventing the Tasmanian Government from building a hydro-electric dam on the Franklin River. Wilson considered that the external affairs power did not give the Federal Parliament authority to pass such legislation as it could obtain power to pass any form of legislation it wished by simply entering into a treaty with another power. Chief Justice Harry Gibbs and Daryl Dawson were the other judges joining Wilson in the dissenting judgement.

Wilson dissented on the first Mabo case of 1988, with the majority finding that the Queensland Coast Islands Declaratory Act, 1879 (Qld), which attempted to retrospectively abolish native title rights, was not valid according to the Racial Discrimination Act, 1975 (Cth).

Wilson retired from the High Court in 1989, aged 67 years.

== Commissioner, 1990-1997 ==
In 1990 the Hawke Government appointed Wilson as the President of the Human Rights and Equal Opportunity Commission, where he served until his retirement in 1997. During his term as Human Right Commissioner, Wilson also served as Deputy Chairperson of the Council for Aboriginal Reconciliation from 1991 to 1994.

Wilson was Chancellor of Murdoch University between 1980 and 1995. The "Ronald Wilson Prize in Law" was first awarded by Murdoch University in 1993 to the graduate who best combines distinguished academic performance in law units with qualities of character, leadership and all-round contribution to the life of the university.

=== Bringing Them Home report ===
Wilson and Mick Dodson, the Aboriginal Social Justice Commissioner, jointly led the National Inquiry into the forced removal of Aboriginal children from their families and communities. Wilson and Dodson visited every state in Australia over the 17-month duration of the Inquiry and heard testimony from 535 aboriginals with 600 more making submissions. Wilson wrote after the completion of the report: "In chairing the National Inquiry (...) I had to relate to hundreds of stories of personal devastation, pain and loss. It was a life-changing experience." The Inquiry produced a report called Bringing Them Home: Report of the National Inquiry into the Separation of Aboriginal and Torres Strait Islander Children from their Families which was tabled in Federal Parliament. "Between 1910 and 1970, up to 100,000 Aboriginal children were taken from their parents and put in white foster homes". It found that Australia was in breach of international law, called for a national compensation fund and recommended a national "sorry day".

The report was welcomed by Aboriginal Australians but widely criticised by conservatives. Anthropologist Ron Brunton said the claims of genocide were an "embellishment"; with social commentator Robert Manne and academic Hal Wootten disputing Brunton's claims. The Prime Minister at the time, John Howard, refused to issue an apology instead stating his regret. The Parliaments of NSW, Northern Territory, South Australia and Victoria passed motions apologising for the maltreatment. The first National Sorry Day was held in 1998 and attracted widespread participation while, in 2000, an estimated 250,000–300,000 people walked across the Sydney Harbour Bridge in support of reconciliation. In 2008, Kevin Rudd as Prime Minister issued an apology to the Stolen Generation on behalf of the Australian people.

=== The WA Inc Royal Commission ===
Carmen Lawrence appointed Wilson as one of the three eminent jurists conducting The WA Inc Royal Commission. The Royal Commission was chaired by Geoffrey Kennedy and the third member was Peter Brinsden with a brief "to inquire into and report" whether there had been "corruption, illegal conduct, improper conduct, or bribery" on the part of any person or corporation in the "affairs, investment decisions and business dealings of the Government of Western Australia or its agencies". In its 1992 report, the Royal Commission said "The commission has found conduct and practices on the part of certain persons involved in government in the period 1983 to 1989 such as to place our government system at risk." It was particularly critical of the behaviour of former Premier Brian Burke who was subsequently convicted for two years on charges of fraudulent behavior in 1994.

== Church and social leadership ==
Throughout his life, Wilson was an active participant in first the Presbyterian Church of Australia and then the Uniting Church in Australia. He held a range of senior positions in the Church including Moderator of Assembly, Presbyterian Church in Western Australia (1965); Moderator, Synod of Western Australia, Uniting Church in Australia (1977-1979); President of the Assembly, Uniting Church in Australia (1988-1991), the first layperson to hold that post; and President of the Australian Chapter of the World Conference on Religion and Peace (1991-1996).

He was particularly concerned with encouraging the broad Australian community to gain an understanding of Australian Aboriginal and Torres Strait Islander history. In retirement, he travelled widely to Aboriginal and church events, and was an active member of a refugee education scheme near his home.

== Honours ==
In 1978 Wilson was appointed a Companion of the Order of St Michael and St George (CMG) for services to the community in Western Australia. The following year he was appointed a Knight Commander of the Order of the British Empire (KBE) for services as a Justice of the High Court of Australia. On 26 January 1988, Wilson was appointed a Companion of the Order of Australia (AC) for services to the law.

In addition, Wilson was awarded the Centenary Medal on 1 January 2001 for service as a Justice of the High Court of Australia and to human rights.

He has been conferred with honorary degrees from the University of Western Australia (Doctor of Laws), Keimyung University (Doctor of Education), and Murdoch University (Doctor of the University).

== Personal life ==
Sir Ronald married Leila Smith in April 1950; and together they had five children and nine grandchildren.

== Selected published works ==
=== Legal findings and reports ===
- National Inquiry into the Separation of Aboriginal and Torres Strait Islander Children from their Families (Australia); Wilson, Ronald Sir, 1922-2005; Australian Human Rights and Equal Opportunity Commission (1997), Bringing them hom : report of the National Inquiry into the Separation of Aboriginal and Torres Strait Islander Children from their Families, Sydney: Australian Human Rights Commission, ISBN 978-0-642-26954-6
- Western Australia. Royal Commission into Commercial Activities of Government and Other Matters; Kennedy, Geoffrey Alexander, 1931-; Wilson, Ronald Darling Sir, 1922-; Brinsden, Peter Frederick (1992), Report of the Royal Commission into Commercial Activities of Government and Other Matters. Part 1, Western Australia: Govt. Printer
- Western Australia. Royal Commission into Commercial Activities of Government and Other Matters; Kennedy, Geoffrey Alexander, 1931-; Wilson, Ronald Darling Sir, 1922-; Brinsden, Peter Frederick (1992), Report of the Royal Commission into Commercial Activities of Government and Other Matters. Part II, Western Australia: Govt. Printer
- Australia. Human Rights and Equal Opportunity Commission; Wilson, Ronald Sir, 1922-2005 (1991), The provision of health and medical services to the Aboriginal communities of Cooktown, Hopevale and Wujal Wujal, Australian Govt. Pub. Service, 1991

=== Other works ===
- Wilson, Ronald Sir (1985). "The Gillick crusade". Australian Journal of Forensic Sciences. 19 (1–2).
- Wilson, Ronald, Sir (February 1994), "From basement to bench: an interview with Sir Ronald Wilson AC, KBE", Brief, 21 (1), East Fremantle, Western Australia: 11–22, ISSN 0312-5831
- Wilson, Ronald Sir (2001), The healing of a nation, North Parramatta, New South Wales: UTC Publications, p. 19, ISBN 978-0-9585856-6-8

Religious titles
Preceded by Ian Tanner	President of the Assembly, Uniting Church in Australia; 1988-1991	Succeeded by H. D'Arcy Wood
Legal offices
Preceded by Sir Kenneth Jacobs	28th Justice of the High Court of Australia; 1979–1989; With: Sir Garfield Barwick (1964–1981); Sir Harry Gibbs (1970–1987); Sir Ninian Stephen (1972–1982); Sir Anthony Frank Mason (1972–1995); Lionel Murphy (1975–1986); Sir Keith Aickin (1976–1982); Sir Gerard Brennan (1981–1998); Sir William Deane (1982–1995); Sir Daryl Dawson (1982–1997); John Toohey (1987–1998); Mary Gaudron (1987–2003)	Succeeded by Michael McHugh
Preceded by Marcus Einfeld	President of the Australian Human Rights and Equal Opportunity Commission; 1990–1997	Succeeded by Alice Tay
Academic offices
Preceded by John Wickham	Chancellor of Murdoch University; 1980–1995	Succeeded by Fred Chaney
