= Eric Edgar Cooke =

Australian serial killer

- Born: 25 February 1931; Perth, Australia
- Died: 26 October 1964 (aged 33); Fremantle Prison, Australia
- Other names: The Night Caller; The Nedlands Monster
- Spouse: Sarah Lavin (m. 1953)
- Children: 7
- Status: Executed by hanging
- Convictions: Wilful murder Arson (4 counts); Breaking and entering (7 counts); Theft (3 counts)
- Penalty: Death

Details
- Victims: 8
- Span of crimes: 1959–1963
- Country: Australia
- State: Western Australia
- Date apprehended: 1 September 1963

Eric Edgar Cooke (25 February 1931 – 26 October 1964), nicknamed the Night Caller and later the Nedlands Monster, was an Australian serial killer who terrorised the city of Perth, Western Australia, from September 1958 to August 1963. Cooke committed at least 20 violent crimes, eight of which resulted in deaths.

Following a four-year killing spree, Cooke was eventually arrested and made extensive admissions to his crimes, including two of which Darryl Beamish and John Button had been wrongfully convicted. In the Supreme Court of Western Australia the jury rejected an insanity defence and he was convicted of wilful murder. Cooke was sentenced to death and hanged at Fremantle Prison. He was the last person to be executed in Western Australia.

== Early life ==
Eric Edgar Cooke was born on 25 February 1931 in Victoria Park, a suburb of Perth, Western Australia, and was the eldest of three children. He was born into an unhappy, violent family; his parents married solely because his mother, Christine Edgar, was pregnant with him. His alcoholic father, Vivian Cooke, beat the boy frequently, especially when the boy tried to protect his mother. Christine would sleep in the staff room at her job in the Como Hotel to avoid going home and being beaten by Vivian.

Cooke was born with a cleft lip and palate, for which he had one surgical operation at three months old and another when he was 3 1/2. The operations were not totally successful and left him with a slight facial deformity and speech impairment. These disabilities made him the target of bullying at school, and he became an outcast. The constant mistreatment caused Cooke to feel ashamed and shy, and he subsequently became emotionally unstable.

Though very good at subjects that required retentive memory and manual dexterity, Cooke was expelled from Subiaco State School for stealing money from a teacher's purse at the age of six. Once he was transferred to Newcastle Street Infants' School, he was again the target of bullying. He continued to be bullied at every school he attended, including Highgate Primary School, Forrest Street Primary School, and Newcastle Street Junior Technical School.

Cooke was also placed in orphanages or foster homes on occasion. Much like his mother, he would hide underneath the house or roam neighbouring streets just to escape a night of his father's violence. He was frequently hospitalised for head injuries and had suspected brain damage because of his accident-proneness. Later it was questioned whether these 'accidents' were due to repressed suicidal tendencies. Cooke also had recurrent headaches and was once admitted to an asylum. His reported blackouts later stopped after an operation in 1949.

Cooke left school at age 14 to work as a delivery boy for Central Provision Stores in order to support the family. He would give his weekly wages to his mother, who could not fully support the family with the money she earned from cooking and cleaning. Many of Cooke's jobs put him in hospital due to his accident-proneness. At a job in the factory of Harris, Scarfe and Sandover, he was hospitalised after being struck on the nose by a winch. At the age of 16, he worked as a hammer boy in the blacksmith section of the workshop at Midland Junction, where he always signed his lunch bag "Al Capone". At the same job he suffered second-degree burns to his face from steam, jarred his right hand and injured his left thumb.

== Early crimes ==
Starting at age 17, Cooke spent his nights involved in petty crimes, vandalism and arson; he would later serve eighteen months in jail for burning down a church after he was rejected in a choir audition. During his later teenage years, Cooke would sneak into houses and steal whatever he found valuable. These crimes escalated to damaging clothing and furniture in acts of vengeance. He would cut out newspaper accounts of his crimes to impress his acquaintances in an attempt to gain friends.

On 12 March 1949, police finally caught up with Cooke and found evidence at his grandmother's house, where he was living. Cooke's fingerprints were matched to those found in other open cases. On 24 May 1949, Cooke was sentenced to three years in prison after being arrested for arson and vandalism; he was convicted on two charges of stealing, seven of breaking and entering and four of arson. He left many fingerprints and easy clues for detectives which would teach him to be more careful in his future crimes.

== Adulthood ==
Cooke was described as "a short, slight man with dark, wavy hair and a twisted mouth". At the age of 21, Cooke joined the regular Australian Army, but was discharged three months later after it was discovered that, before enlistment, he had had a juvenile criminal record. During his training, he was quickly promoted to lance corporal and was taught to handle firearms.

On 14 November 1953, Cooke, then aged 22, married Sarah (Sally) Lavin, a 19-year-old waitress, at the Cannington Methodist Church (demolished 1995). They ultimately had a large family of seven children, four boys and three girls.

During the 1950s and early 1960s, people in Australia frequently left cars unlocked and often with the keys in the ignition. Cooke found it easy to steal cars at night and sometimes returned stolen vehicles without the owners becoming aware of the theft. In September 1955, after crashing a car and requiring hospitalisation, Cooke was sentenced to two years’ hard labour on a charge of unlawful use of a motor vehicle; he was ultimately released from Fremantle Prison just prior to Christmas, 1956. After his release, he took to wearing gloves while committing crimes in order to avoid leaving his fingerprints, which had provided evidence for his prior breaking and entering convictions.

== Murder spree ==
Cooke's four-year killing spree involved a series of seemingly unrelated hit-and-runs, stabbings, strangulations, and shootings. Victims were shot with different rifles, stabbed with knives and scissors, hit with cars, and beaten with an axe. Several were killed after waking up as Cooke was robbing their homes, two were shot while sleeping without their homes being disturbed, and one was shot dead after answering the doorbell. After stabbing one victim, Cooke got lemonade from the refrigerator and sat on the verandah drinking it. One victim was strangled to death with the cord from a bedside lamp, after which Cooke raped the corpse, disrobed and dragged it to a neighbour's lawn, then sexually penetrated it with an empty whisky bottle. He then left the bottle cradled in the victim's arms.

Cooke's murder victims were Pnena (Penny) Berkman, Jillian McPherson Brewer, John Lindsay Sturkey, George Ormond Walmsley, Rosemary Anderson, Constance Lucy Madrill, and Shirley Martha McLeod. Another victim, Brian Vincent Weir, ultimately died as a result of permanent injury two years after having been shot by Cooke. Berkman and Brewer were killed in 1959, whereas Sturkey, Walmsley, Anderson, Madrill and McLeod were killed in 1963. Weir was attacked in 1963, but died in 1965. As the crimes were opportunistic and used varying methods, and Cooke's victims shared no obvious common traits, it was not understood that all these crimes were being perpetrated by one individual killer. In fact, two of the murders—the deaths of Jillian Brewer and Rosemary Anderson—were attributed to other men, who were wrongfully convicted of those crimes.

== Investigation ==
The police investigation included fingerprinting more than 30,000 males over the age of 12, as well as locating and test-firing more than 60,000 .22 rifles. After a rifle was found hidden in a Geraldton wax bush on Rookwood Street, Mount Pleasant, in August 1963, ballistic tests proved the gun had been used in the McLeod murder. Police returned to the location and tied a similar rifle, rendered inoperable, to the bush with fishing line and constructed a hide in which they waited in case someone returned for it. Cooke was noted loitering in a car in the area several times, and was apprehended when he tried to collect the weapon just after midnight on 1 September. After initial denials regarding the McLeod murder, Cooke cracked after one of the detectives, Max Baker, snapped at him.

"Cookie, you're gonna hang, you know – there's no doubt about it. You got a wife and kids, think of them, and then think about whether you're gonna be dragged to the gallows like a mongrel dog or you gonna go there like a man."

Cooke began confessing to his many crimes, including eight murders and fourteen attempted murders. He was convicted on a charge of murdering Sturkey, one of Cooke's five Australia Day shooting victims. In his confessions, Cooke demonstrated an exceptionally good memory for the details of his crimes irrespective of how long ago he had committed the offences. For example, he confessed to more than 250 burglaries and was able to detail exactly what he took, including the number and denominations of the coins he had stolen from each location. The book Presumed Guilty by Bret Christian includes details of Cooke's confession, made over two days in September 1963 at Fremantle Prison to his Legal Aid lawyer Desmond Heenan. "I have a great respect for the law, although my actions don't show this," Cooke said.

== Conviction and execution ==
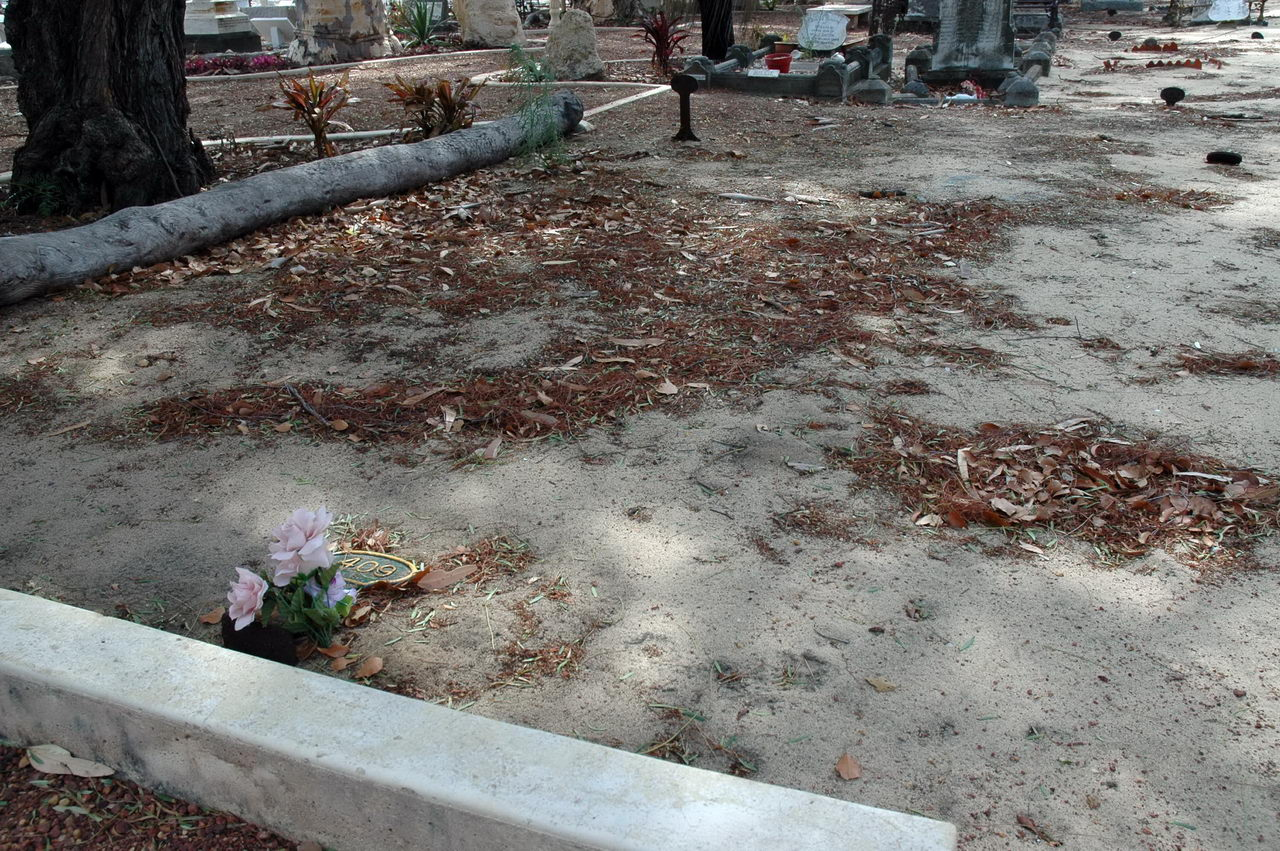
Cooke's grave in plot 409, Fremantle Cemetery

On 25 November 1963, Cooke stood trial in the Supreme Court of Western Australia before Justice Virtue and a jury. Cooke pleaded not guilty on the grounds of insanity. Cooke was represented by Ken Hatfield QC and Desmond Heenan, while the Crown Prosecutors were Ronald Wilson (later Sir Ronald Wilson, a Justice of the High Court of Australia) and Kevin Parker.

At the trial, Cooke's lawyers claimed that he had schizophrenia, but this claim was dismissed after the director of the state mental health services testified that he was sane. The state would not allow independent psychiatric specialists to examine Cooke. After a three-day trial, Cooke was convicted of wilful murder. It took the jury of eight men and four women one hour and five minutes to reach their verdict, which Justice Virtue afterwards told them was correct. On 27 November 1963, Cooke was sentenced to death by hanging for the murder of John Lindsay Sturkey. The death sentence having been imposed, his other charges were held in abeyance. Despite having grounds to appeal, he ordered his lawyers not to do so, claiming that he deserved to pay for what he had done.

Cooke was hanged at 8 am on 26 October 1964 in Fremantle Prison, 11 months after being sentenced. Ten minutes before the sentence was carried out, Cooke swore on the Bible that he had killed Brewer and Anderson, claims which had been previously rejected because other people had already been convicted of those murders. Cooke was the last person to be hanged in the state of Western Australia. He was buried in Fremantle Cemetery, above the remains of child killer Martha Rendell, who in 1909, was the last woman to be hanged in Fremantle Prison.

== Wrongful convictions ==
Two of Cooke's murders resulted in other men being falsely convicted of them:

=== Beamish case ===
In August 1961, Darryl Beamish, a deaf-mute, was wrongfully convicted of murdering Jillian Macpherson Brewer, a Melbourne heiress who was struck with a hatchet and stabbed with scissors, in 1959. He became a suspect since he had recently pleaded guilty to molesting four young girls and had a history of breaking and entering. Beamish was initially sentenced to death, but the sentence was commuted to imprisonment, and a later investigation, supported by Post Newspapers owner Bret Christian, led to his conviction being overturned. Beamish's initial appeal was dismissed because the court did not believe Cooke's evidence. The prosecution claimed that Cooke's confessions were an attempt to prolong his own trial, and the then-Chief Justice of Western Australia, Sir Albert Wolff, called Cooke a "villainous unscrupulous liar". The police case against Beamish is detailed in Christian's book Presumed Guilty.

=== Button case ===
John Button was wrongfully convicted of a lesser charge of manslaughter in the murder of his girlfriend, Rosemary Anderson, who died in Royal Perth Hospital (RPH) at 2:30am in the early morning of 10 February 1963. Anderson had spent the previous day with Button in celebration of his nineteenth birthday; they had a minor argument at his home that night which culminated in her deciding to leave the Button house and walk home. Button followed her in his car at different stages, attempting to have her accept a lift home. At one stage Button parked his car to smoke a cigarette; upon resuming driving he turned into Stubbs Terrace, in Shenton Park, and discovered her lying on the ground beside the road. John Button took his injured girlfriend to a local doctor and she was subsequently transferred to RPH by ambulance. The police became involved and interviewed Button who, after intense questioning and upon receiving notice of Anderson's death, broke down and confessed to being responsible for her hit and run death. After conviction for manslaughter, the courts dismissed Button's initial appeal, even though Cooke had by this time confessed to the crime and provided details that only the culprit could have known; in particular, the judges did not believe Cooke's claim that Anderson's body was thrown "over the roof" of a Holden EK sedan without damaging its external windscreen sun visor, as Cooke had claimed.

Over subsequent decades, Button and his supporters – including Christian and Blackburn – continued to press for a retrial, a campaign that included a well-publicised 1998 simulated reenactment of Anderson's death, conducted by crash test experts, with both a Holden matching one believed to have been used by Cooke on the night in question, and three Simca Aronde sedans like the car owned by Button, which were driven toward a crash test dummy. The dummy was thrown over the roof of the Holden, as Cooke had claimed, and the damage sustained matched the records of a panelbeating business that had, in 1963, repaired the vehicle driven by Cooke. The experts found that the sun visor flexed when hit by a body and returned to its original shape, without cracking the paint. An expert from the United States was brought to Australia to prove Cooke's car, not Button's, hit Anderson.

=== Acquittals ===
Despite Cooke's 1963 confession, Beamish served 15 years (including five years for assaulting a girl while on parole), while Button served four years and nine months. In 2002, the Court of Criminal Appeal quashed Button's conviction. Button's success opened the way for an appeal by Beamish, who was acquitted in 2005. In both cases, the appeal judges found that the murders had most likely been committed by Cooke. In 2003, Button was granted a A$460,000 ex gratia payment by the Western Australian government. On 2 June 2011, Beamish was granted a A$425,000 ex gratia payment by the Western Australian government.

== Media ==
Estelle Blackburn spent six years writing the biographical story Broken Lives, about Cooke's life and criminal career, focusing particularly on the devastation left on his victims and their families. New information on Cooke and fresh evidence published in the book led to the exonerations of Button and Beamish. Another book was Presumed Guilty: When Cops get it Wrong and Courts Seal the Deal by Bret Christian.

In Randolph Stow's final novel, The Suburbs of Hell (1984), he acknowledged that there was a delayed response to the horror of Cooke's murders, which he transposed for fictional purposes from his WA origins to a town resembling the English town he then inhabited, Harwich. Suzanne Falkiner's biography of Stow revealed that it piqued his sense of humour that Perth denizens at the time of the murders would knock on doors and say 'It's the Nedlands Monster'.

A 2000 memoir by Robert Drewe, The Shark Net – later made into a three-part television series – provided one author's impressions of the effect the murders had on the Perth of that era. According to Drewe, more people bought dogs for security, and locked back doors and garages that had never been secured before.

Cooke, as "The Nedlands Monster", features in Tim Winton's 1991 novel Cloudstreet and the subsequent 2011 television adaptation. Cooke is also referenced in Craig Silvey's 2009 novel Jasper Jones.

In March 2009, the second season of Crime Investigation Australia featured an episode about Eric Edgar Cooke. In September 2016, Felon True Crime Podcast also reviewed Cooke's crime spree in detail.

In November 2020, Stan released an original four-part docuseries After the Night, covering the story of Cooke's murders.

In February 2025 Australian true crime podcast Casefile covered the murders in a two-part episode entitled The Night Caller.

== See also ==
- Donald Henry Gaskins, an American serial killer with similarly varied murder weapons and victims.
- List of serial killers by country
- Volunteer (capital punishment)
