= Darryl Beamish =

Australian wrongly convicted of murder

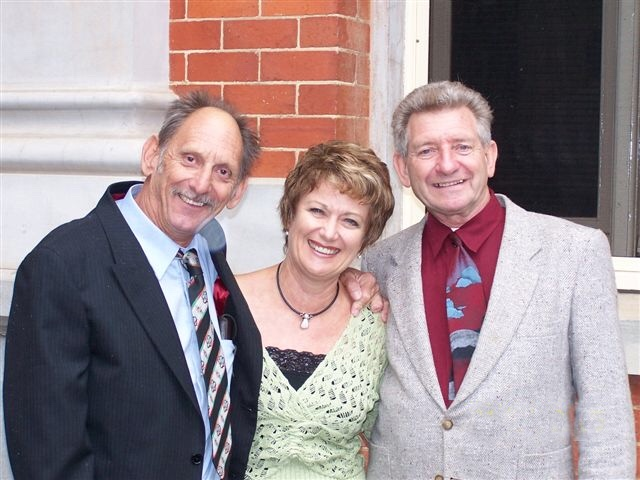
Justice for Button and Beamish: Darryl Beamish, Estelle Blackburn and John Button at the Supreme Court celebrating Beamish's exoneration on 1 April 2005 (44 years after conviction), following Button's exoneration on 25 February 2002 (39 years after conviction).

Darryl Beamish (born 1941) is a Western Australian man who was wrongfully convicted of wilful murder in 1961 and sentenced to death by hanging. He was deaf and mute. The death sentence was commuted to life imprisonment and he was paroled in 1971, albeit he returned to prison for six years after assaulting a young girl while on parole. After six appeals, his murder conviction was finally overturned in 2005. The murder for which Beamish was wrongfully convicted had actually been committed by serial killer Eric Edgar Cooke.

Beamish became a suspect since he had recently pleaded to molesting four young girls and had a history of burglary. He was one of two men to be wrongfully convicted of murders committed by Cooke, the other being John Button. Unlike Beamish, Button was completely innocent of any crime.

== History ==
Darryl Beamish, a deaf mute man, was aged 18 in 1959 when the 22-year-old socialite and MacRobertson's chocolate heiress, Jillian MacPherson Brewer, was slain in her Cottesloe flat by an intruder who mutilated her body with a tomahawk and a pair of dressmaking scissors. Beamish was charged with her murder in April 1961. He became a suspect since he had a history of breaking and entering and had recently pleaded guilty to four counts of aggravated assault on four young girls, ages four and five. The attacks were sexual in nature; Beamish had taken each child to a secluded area, removed part of her clothing, then masturbated as he fondled her. According to Perth Detective Owen Leitch, Beamish provided four confessions, two through a sign language interpreter, one a written statement and another in notes scrawled on the exercise yard at the Perth lock-up. Beamish said the confessions were obtained through intimidation and threats, and were untrue. Some of those who knew Beamish expressed doubt over his guilt. They believed his crimes against the girls stemmed from his childlike manner and repressed curiosity about sex, since he otherwise wasn't known to be violent.

In 1961, Beamish was found guilty of wilful murder and sentenced to death, albeit the jury added a strong recommendation for mercy. At his trial, Beamish said he was threatened and bullied into confessing. However, his attacks on the character of his interrogators were used by the prosecution as a pretense to attack his own character. The prosecution informed the jury of the crimes for which Beamish was actually guilty to prove that he was capable of committing the murder. In overturning his conviction decades later, the Supreme Court of Western Australia stated that while Beamish was indeed both a burglar and a child molester, the actions of the prosecutors almost certainly would've been forbidden had the trial occurred in the 21st-century.

Beamish appealed to the Court of Criminal Appeal on the grounds that the trial judge's directions were in error, and his confession was involuntary and therefore should have been ruled inadmissible or excluded in the trial judge's discretion. The appeal was dismissed on 20 October 1961 and an application for leave to appeal to the High Court of Australia was dismissed on 11 December 1961. Three days later, Beamish's sentence was commuted to life in prison with hard labour. He was released from prison in March 1971 and ordered to serve five years on parole. In March 1972, Beamish was charged with aggravated assault against an 8-year-old girl in an alley in November 1971. In May 1972, he was found guilty and sentenced to six months in prison and ordered to resume his life sentence. Beamish was paroled again in 1977.

Serial killer Eric Edgar Cooke, who had been questioned in relation to the Brewer murder in January 1960, confessed to the murder on 10 September 1963. Beamish filed a petition to the Attorney-General which was referred to the Court of Criminal Appeal. The Court of Criminal Appeal dismissed the reference on 22 May 1964. Wolff CJ, who had also been the trial judge, held that the case against Beamish was "strong." Virtue J described Cooke as an "utterly worthless scoundrel" and "palpable and unscrupulous liar". The appeal was dismissed. A further application for special leave to appeal to the High Court was dismissed on 14 September 1964, as was an appeal to the Privy Council.

Beamish's case caused continuing concern in legal circles. On the morning of his hanging at Fremantle Prison on 26 October 1964, without prompting, Cooke took the Bible from the prison chaplain and said: "I swear before Almighty God that I killed Anderson and Brewer." In a book titled The Beamish Case (1966), Australian professor of jurisprudence Peter Brett argued that the affair was a "monstrous miscarriage of justice".

== Successful appeal ==
Western Australian journalist Estelle Blackburn's book Broken Lives prompted an appeal by John Button. Button had also been convicted of a crime to which Cooke had confessed before his death.

Button's appeal was allowed on 25 February 2002. The appeal judges' decision was based on fresh forensic evidence obtained by the publisher of Broken Lives, journalist and Post Newspapers publisher Bret Christian, which suggested that Button's vehicle was not involved in Ms Anderson's death (a central part of the prosecution case).

The suggestion, in Christian's Daryl Beamish biography Presumed Guilty, came after Christian wrote about US car crash expert Rusty Haight's testing of vehicles from the time of Anderson's death.

The success of Button's appeal raised doubts about the Court of Criminal Appeal's reasons for rejecting Cooke's confession in Beamish's 1964 appeal. Beamish's conviction was finally overturned by the Court of Criminal Appeal on 1 April 2005.

It also reflected a common theme in Australian evidence legislation. If a prosecution had not commenced at the time the documentary statement came into existence, the requisite purpose would not be proved "unless there was at the time at least a real prospect of a prosecution".

Perth lawyers Tom Percy QC and Jonathan Davies had worked pro bono on both men's appeals for seven years from 1998. They were awarded the Australian Lawyers Alliance West Australian Civil Justice Award in August 2007 for their efforts exposing injustices in the West Australian legal system.

On 2 June 2011, fifty years after his conviction, Beamish was granted a A$425,000 ex gratia payment by the Western Australian government. Attorney-General Christian Porter said the payment was "intended to express the State's sincere regret for what occurred and provide [Beamish] with a measure of comfort and financial security in his retirement."

== In popular culture ==
The murder and ensuing legal proceedings are explored by Bret Christian in 2013 non-fiction book Presumed Guilty.

== See also ==
- Ronald Wilson
- List of miscarriage of justice cases

== Bibliography ==
- 'A Case of Science and Justice', pp. 18–22, the Skeptic, Spring 2002
- Blackburn, Estelle (2001). Broken lives. Hardie Grant. ISBN 174064073X. (review)
