= John Button (campaigner) =

Australian man wrongly convicted of manslaughter

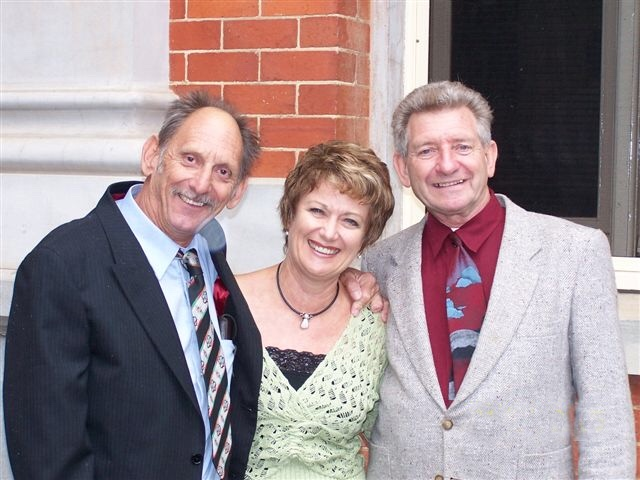
Darryl Beamish, Estelle Blackburn and John Button celebrating Beamish's exoneration on 1 April 2005. Button had been exonerated on 25 February 2002.

John Button (born 9 February 1944 in Liverpool, England) is a Western Australian man who was the victim of a significant miscarriage of justice. Button was wrongfully convicted of the manslaughter, by vehicle impact, of his girlfriend, Rosemary Anderson, in 1963. He was sentenced to 10 years in prison, and released in 1968. The conviction was quashed in 2002. The murder for which Button was wrongfully convicted had actually been committed by serial killer Eric Edgar Cooke. He was one of two men to be wrongfully convicted of murders committed by Cooke, the other being Darryl Beamish. Although Beamish had only become a suspect since he was a burglar and convicted child molester, Button was completely innocent of any crime.

== Vindication ==
Several appeals to courts or for ministerial intervention were unsuccessful. In 1998, a Western Australian journalist, Estelle Blackburn, advanced the cause of Button's vindication through her book Broken Lives. Following the book's publication the case went before the courts again with Button represented by Tom Percy QC and Jonathan Davies both of whom worked pro bono on the case.

At the original trial the strongest evidence apart from Button's confession was that his 1962 Simca P60 Aronde sedan had damage consistent with an accident. Trevor Condron was the police officer who had examined John Button's Simca in 1963 but he had not been asked what could have caused the damage at the trial. He told the appeals court that while the car was damaged, the damage was not consistent with hitting a person and that three weeks before Anderson's death, Button had reported to police an accident with a Ford Prefect that had caused matching damage to that seen by Condron. This accident report had been known to police at the original trial but been discounted as irrelevant. The court also heard from Dr Neil Turner who had treated Anderson. He claimed that her injuries were not consistent with Button's vehicle. The world's leading pedestrian accident expert, American William "Rusty" Haight, was flown to Australia and testified that experiments with a biomedical human-form dummy, three Simca P60 sedans similar to that owned by John Button and a 1961/62 Holden EK sedan similar to the one serial killer Eric Edgar Cooke claimed he was driving when he hit Anderson, matched exactly Cooke's account and excluded the Simca.

Button self-published a book in 1998 titled Why Me Lord! which told of his ordeal.

On 25 February 2002, the Court of Criminal Appeal quashed Button's conviction after evidence from vehicle crash experts proved that Cooke was most likely the culprit. In a televised interview six months after Button's conviction was quashed, Rosemary Anderson's parents refused to embrace the finding and still maintained that Cooke did not kill their daughter and that Button was guilty. A conference between the Button, Anderson and Cooke families, Blackburn and her publisher Bret Christian organized by Australian Story changed their minds, although Mrs. Anderson maintained Button was still responsible as it was his role as her escort on the night to bring her home. Following a meeting with the W.A Director of Public Prosecutions to discuss the court's findings, the Andersons accepted Button's innocence was proven.

Button now spearheads the Western Australian Innocence Project which aims to free the wrongfully convicted.

== See also ==
- List of miscarriage of justice cases
