= Australian Story =

Documentary TV series

- Genre: News and Current Affairs/ Documentary
- Presented by: Caroline Jones (1996–2016) Leigh Sales (2023–)
- Country of origin: Australia
- Original language: English
- No. of seasons: 25
- No. of episodes: 1011

Production
- Executive producer: Greg Hassall
- Production location: ABC Brisbane
- Running time: 30 minutes

Original release
- Network: ABC; ABC News
- Release: 29 May 1996 – present

Australian Story is a national weekly current affairs and documentary style television series which is broadcast on ABC Television. It is produced specifically by the ABC News and Current Affairs Department. The program first aired on 29 May 1996, and since then it has continued to profile various Australian people, typically ones with a diverse background or notable reputation. In 2026 Australian Story is marking 30 years and more than 1,400 episodes.

Australian Story tends to explore themes such as 'heroic achievement', 'taking a stand' and 'human weakness'. This personal approach to story-telling has been well received by many, with the program winning many awards including multiple Walkley Awards for excellence in journalism and four consecutive Logie Awards (2003–2006). As of 2013, it attracted an average audience of more than one million viewers each week, making it one of the most popular programs on ABC Television.

== Format ==
Australian Story is a weekly half-hour program which airs on Mondays at 8pm (AEST). The program is categorised as a documentary style current affairs program. This hybrid categorisation is a result of the program's decision to present newsworthy stories without the presence of an onscreen reporter. Instead, the program aims to have subjects tell their own stories in their own words.

Each week the program presents a story relating to a notable figure or unknown Australian with an interesting story. These are referred to as profiles and they convey subjective experiences. Profiles account for both Australian celebrities and lesser known more ordinary Australians. The program has an intimate approach to storytelling. The subjects are filmed in relevant environments such as their respective home or workplace. Profiles also include footage of and confessionals made by relevant family and friends. Each profile on average, is filmed over a period of 10–12 days, and each episode has an eight-week turnaround.

== Broadcast history ==
In 1996 the ABC restructured its current affairs program The 7:30 Report, turning separate state editions into one centralised national program. As a result, The 7:30 Report had less scope for localised, human interest stories. ABC in Brisbane established Australian Story as a result of the restructuring, and they were given a remit for rural coverage. The program began screening on 29 May 1996.

Australian Story was initially supposed to be a series of small magazine-style stories. It quickly started focusing on one single story for each episode, this is the format it still uses today. Given it was shot predominantly outside of a studio and always without the presence of a reporter, Australian Story was originally considered to be a novelty current affairs program. Other unconventional elements included their camera work and pacing which were considered to be slow and cinematic. These characteristics of the show contribute to its classification as a documentary.

The first Australian Story episode featured three short stories:

- A Soldier's Journey Sir William Keys, a World War Two veteran and the former head of the RSL, Keys spoke about how he used Chinese medicine to combat his cancer. - Wild Stallion with horse breaker Robert Watchirs - Dante's Inferno with movie producer Neil Cameron

In 2016 Australian Story celebrated its 20th anniversary and broadcast a two-part special. The special acknowledged many notable stories covered since the program's inception, such as Hazel Hawke's Alzheimer's diagnosis, Australian actress Jacki Weaver's battle with alcoholism and Gail Shann's life in rural Queensland after losing her arms. The special revealed that over the span of 20 years Australian Story had covered over 800 stories.

Caroline Jones was previously the program's presenter and would introduce the subject at the beginning of an episode. Occasionally a high-profile person would fill this role, such one off presenters included the likes of Matt Damon, Elton John and Dawn Fraser. Jones announced she was leaving Australian Story at the end of 2016. As a result of her departure, it was decided that episodes would no longer be introduced by a presenter, although in 2023 the original format returned with Leigh Sales stepping into the role.

Episodes of Australian Story have always aired on a Monday night at 8:00pm (AEST) on ABC TV. and ABC iview. Episodes have been available weekly on ABC News In-Depth YouTube since 2017. In addition to this, episodes are made available via the Australian Story webpage and ABC iview.

== Ratings ==
Year	Combined Average Audience
2012–13	1.3 million
2013–14	1.3 million
2014–15	1.3 million
2015–16	1.2 million
2016–17	1.1 million
2017–18	976,000
2018–19	999,000
2025	1.38m

== Recognition and awards ==
Year	Awards
1997	Walkley Award for 'Best Current Affairs Report, Feature, Documentary or Special' to Ben Cheshire and Sophie Emtage for "Valentines Day"
1998	Walkley Award for 'Coverage of Indigenous Affairs' to John Millard for "Camilla's Conversion" Walkley Award for Cinematography to Laurence Mcmanus for "A Cold Wind in August"
1999	Melbourne Press Club Quill Award for 'Best Rural Story' to Tim Lee for "A Track Winding Back" UNAA Media Peace Award for 'Best Television' to Tim Lee, Mara Blazic, Kent Gordon, Vince Tucci, Erik Havnen, Ro Woods, Colin Jones, and Stuart Palmer for "A Track Winding Back"
2000	United Nations Media Peace Award for 'Promotion of Multicultural Issues' to Australian Story for "Mild Colonial Boy" National Youth Media Award for 'Best Television Current Affairs Program/Documentary' to Brigid Donovan for "Carve Their Names With Pride"
2001	Media Peace Award for 'Promotion of Aboriginal Reconciliation' to Ben Cheshire for "Bridge Over Myall Creek" Australian Cinematographers Society Award QLD to Anthony Sines for "Something in the Air"
2002	Walkley Award for 'Current Affairs, Feature, Documentary more than 10 minutes' to Wendy Page and Ian Harley for "Murder He Wrote"
2003	TV Week Logie Award for 'Most Outstanding Documentary Series' to Australian Story Victorian Press Club Quill Award for 'Best TV Current Affairs Feature' to Belinda Hawkins, Mara Blazic and Roger Carter for "Being Allan Fells" MEAA Queensland Media Award for 'Best Feature/Documentary' to Claire Forster for "Against The Tide" MEAA Queensland Media Award for 'Best Cinematography' to John Bean for "With This Ring"
2004	TV Week Logie Award for 'Most Outstanding Public Affairs Program' to Helen Grasshill, Quentin Davis, Katy Graham and Ian Harley for "The Big A"
2005	TV Week Logie Award for 'Most Outstanding Public Affairs Programme' to Ben Cheshire and John Stewart for "Into the Forest" Walkley Award for Journalistic Leadership to Australian Story's Executive Producer Deborah Fleming Walkley Award for 'Best long-form current affairs' to Helen Grasswill for "The Gathering Storm"
2006	TV Week Logie Award for 'Most Outstanding Public Affairs' to Helen Grasswill for "The Gathering Storm" Walkley Award for 'Sport Feature' to Ben Cheshire, Jessica Daly and Kristine Taylor for "One Perfect Day" Australian Sports Commission Media Award for 'Best Profiling of an Athlete, Team or Coach' to Ben Cheshire, Jessica Daly and Kristine Taylor for "One Perfect Day"
2007	Walkley Award for 'Best Sports Feature' to Wendy Page for "Man of the Century" Australian Sports Commission Award for 'Best profiling of an Athlete, Team or Coach' to Wendy Page and Ian Harley for "Man of the Century"
2008	TV Week Logie Award for 'Most Outstanding Public Affairs Report' to Brigid Donovan and Angela Leonardi for "Some Meaning in This Life" Walkley Award for 'Best Sports Feature' to Ben Cheshire, Peter Wilkins and Quentin Davis for "She's Not There" Walkley Award for 'Television News and Current Affairs Camera' to Andrew Taylor for "Show of Force" Australian Sports Commission Media Award for 'Best Profiling of an Athlete, Team or Coach' to Ben Cheshire, Peter Wilkins and Quentin Davis for "She's Not There"
2009	Australian Sports Commission Media Award for 'Best Profiling of an Athlete, Team or Coach' to Roger Carter for "When We Were Racers" Suicide Prevention Australia Life Award to Belinda Hawkins, Elena Christie and Mara Blazic for "The Girl Least Likely" Queensland Media Award for 'Best Current Affairs, Documentary or Feature' to Caitlin Shea and Kristine Taylor for "All The Pretty Horses"
2010	Melbourne Press Club Quill Award for 'Best TV Current Affairs/Feature Over 10 minutes' to Belinda Hawkins, Elena Christie for "The Story of Samuel" Victoria Law Foundation Legal Reporting Award for 'Best report: TV – long form' to Brigid Donovan and Elena Christie for "Cold Comfort Farm"
2023	TV Week Logie Awards: Most Popular Current Affairs Program
2024	TV Week Logie Awards: Best Current Affairs Program
2025	TV Week Logie Awards: Best Current Affairs Program
2026	Australian Screen Editors Guild Ellie Awards Best Editing in News & Current Affairs Winner: Andrew Cooke ASE (Australian Story Making Lachlan Murdoch – Part 2: Money) Highly commended: Angela Leonardi (Australian Story The River – Part 1 and 2) NSW and ACT Current Affairs GOLD Tom Hancock (Australian Story "Betrayal -- The Story of Hannah Grundy")

== Criticism ==
Australian Story has received criticism due to the fact that it does not belong solely to one genre. The program is classified by the ABC as a News and Current Affairs Program as well as a documentary series. Australian Story's status as a documentary program though has been contested by Australian documentary filmmakers. This is because the program is a serial production made for a television network and from a formal broadcasting location. The program's status as a News and Current Affairs Program has also been questioned by academics who claim Australian Story exhibits a soft journalistic approach. Such critiques suggest the program has become a platform for people with high-profile stories who want to manage their image and the publicity surrounding it.

=== "The Road to Kerobokan" ===
Australian Story aired an episode on 13 January 2006 entitled 'The Road to Kerobokan'. It detailed the story of Scott Rush, a 20-year-old Australian male who was on trial in Bali, Indonesia for his part in a heroin smuggling attempt. The episode aired only hours after Rush received a life sentence. Producers Helen Grasswill and Ruth Dexter chose not to disclose Rush's previous criminal misdemeanours in the episode per legal advice. This was because such information could damage Rush's appeal process. The episode still acknowledged that Rush had previous misdemeanours but did not detail them. The following morning on 14 February, the day after the Australian Story episode aired, the Queensland Courier-Mail published a front-page story with the headline 'Mule had history of crime'. This article exposed in more detail Rush's prior drug offences. In response, an episode of ABC's program Media Watch exposed that a negative sentiment was shared among many Australian Story viewers because the program had chosen not to disclose such information. As reported by Media Watch, Paul Toohey of Australian Magazine The Bulletin said 'whatever that Australian Story was, it was not journalism'. Such backlash has contributed to the idea that Australian Story is too soft on its subjects.

=== "Something in the Water" ===
In 2010, Australian Story aired a two-part profile entitled "Something in the Water", broadcast on 15 and 22 February. The profile was on Alison Bleaney, a doctor and member of local council in the Tasmanian town of St Helens. Bleaney raised concerns about links between forest industry practices and the supposed presence of toxins in Tasmanian waterways. The episodes aired during the Tasmanian State election campaign, and garnered political attention. Accusations arose after the episodes aired, that they had been deliberately broadcast during the 2010 Tasmanian State Election campaign, in order to influence the result. Deborah Fleming who was Australian Story's executive producer at the time responded to such criticism by saying that the program had sought only to report concerns rather than facts. Although past public surveys have revealed that Australians rely on the ABC News and Current Affairs Department as a source of trustworthy political information. It is expected that when this department gives an issue in-depth attention, it will become legitimated and treated as a current affair rather than solely a human interest story. Because of this, "Something in the Water" came under scrutiny with critics arguing it should have been more scientifically credible.

== Notable profiles ==
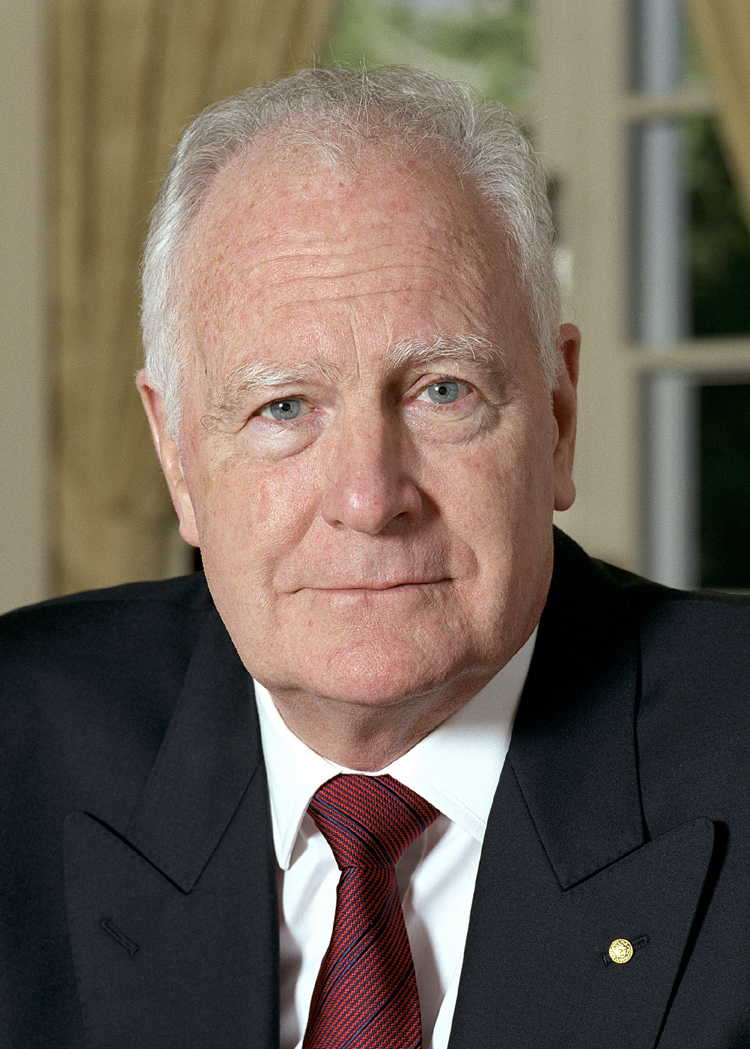
Peter Hollingworth, the subject of Australian Story's notable episode entitled "The Gilded Cage".

=== "The Gilded Cage" ===
In 2002, Australian Story aired a profile on the former Australian Governor-General and Anglican Archbishop of Brisbane Dr Peter Hollingworth. The episode was entitled "The Gilded Cage". This was a notable episode because Australian Story had the exclusive interview with Hollingworth after a major school sex abuse scandal he had inadvertently played a part in. Whilst Hollingworth was Archbishop there were two serial pedophiles active in three Brisbane Anglican schools and the way he handled the situation was widely deemed across Australia as inappropriate. In "The Gilded Cage" Hollingworth implied that a 14-year-old girl was the one to initiate the sexual relationship she had with a Priest. These comments were met with controversy from the Australian public and he eventually resigned from his position as Governor-General over the matter. The candid and confessional nature of the interview served Australian Story's reputation as being a provider of real and personal stories.

=== "Murder He Wrote" ===
"Murder He Wrote" is a notable Australian Story profile as it was the program's first ever two-part profile, spanning over two episodes. Prior to this profile Australian Story had never dedicated more than one episode to a story. The episodes were broadcast respectively on 29 July 2002 and 5 August 2002. They detailed the story of John Button, a man from Western Australia who was wrongfully convicted of murder. Button had been convicted of killing his girlfriend Rosemary Anderson, but the case was reopened when he appealed the conviction and attributed her death to the very high-profile serial killer Eric Edgar Cooke. Producer of these episodes, Wendy Page, had researched the case for 6 years before pursuing the story. Herself and Ian Harley won the Walkley Award for 'Current Affairs, Feature, Documentary more than 10 minutes' with this profile. Australian Story interviewed members of the Button, Anderson and Cooke families throughout the appeal process. The profile concluded with Button's exoneration, his case was one of the longest-standing convictions to be overturned in Australia's legal history.

=== "Into the Forest" ===
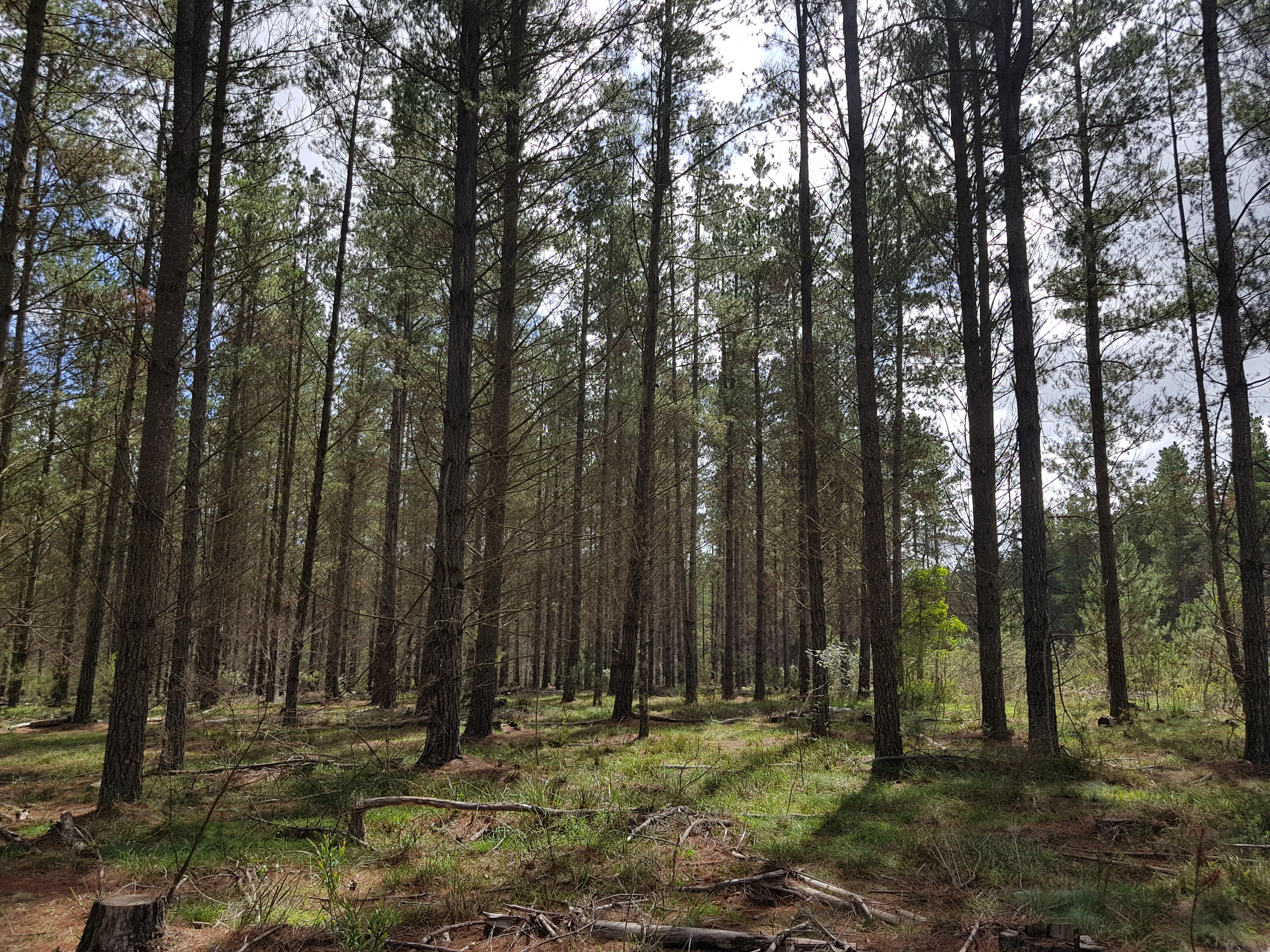
Australian Story made "Into the Forest" after additional human bones had been found within Belanglo State Forest in 2004. This was where Milat buried his victims in the 1990s.

On 1 November 2004, Australian Story aired the first episode of a two-part profile entitled "Into the Forest". This two-part profile explores the crimes of infamous Australian serial killer Ivan Milat. In Part 1, Australian Story spoke to Milat's younger brothers Bill and Richard, older brother Boris and sister-in-law Caroline as well as Clive Small who was the NSW Police Superintendent whilst Milat's case was open. According to Screen Australia this episode was the number 1 top rated Australian documentary on television in 2004. Producers Ben Cheshire and John Stewart won the TV Week Logie Award for 'Most Outstanding Public Affairs Programme' for this profile.

=== "Beyond Reasonable Doubt" ===
"Beyond Reasonable Doubt" was the first ever three-part profile for Australian Story, with the three episodes broadcast in 2006 starting on 17 July. At the time, the case attracted national public interest and generated heated debate. It followed three men, Fazzari, Pereiras and Martinez, who had been convicted for the murder of Phillip Walsham in 1998. The episodes focus heavily on Mirella Scaramella, the girlfriend of Fazzari, and her efforts to fight the verdict. A year following this Australian Story profile, the three men were exonerated by the Western Australia Court of Appeal.

=== "Unbreakable" ===
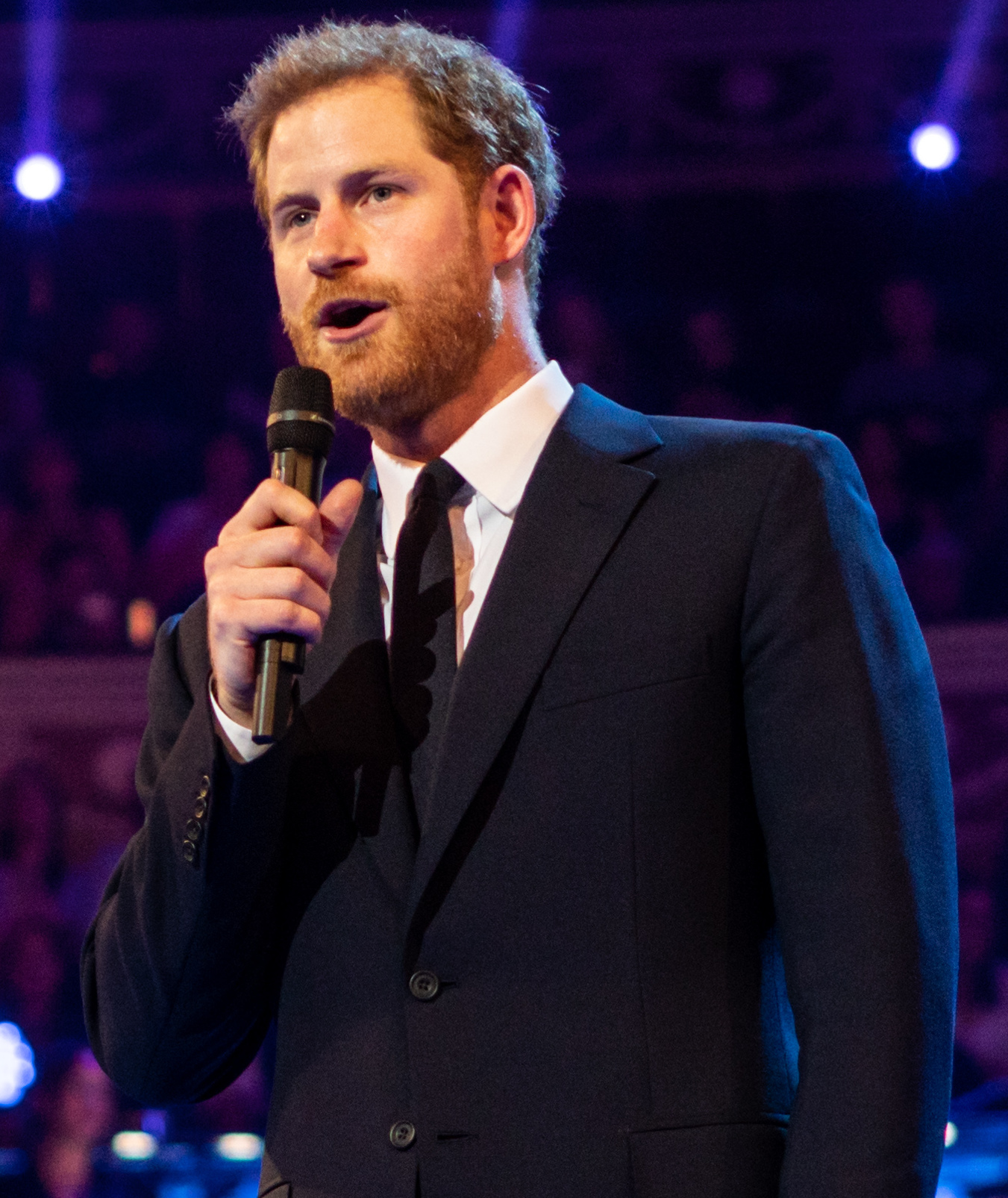
For the episode "Unbreakable" Australian Story spoke exclusively to Prince Harry ahead of his appearance at the 2018 Sydney Invictus Games

The Australian Story special entitled "Unbreakable" detailed the experience of competitor Garry Robinson who managed to survive a Black Hawk helicopter crash in Afghanistan in 2010 and went on to compete in the Invictus Games. The episode is notable because it attracted a complete audience of 2 million people. Most episodes generally garner an audience of 1 million people. "Unbreakable" aired on Monday 15 October 2018.Australian Story spoke exclusively to Prince Harry throughout this episode, as he is the founder of the Invictus Games. He was interviewed from inside Kensington Palace.

=== "A Complicated Life: Kerry Packer" ===
In April 2014, Australian Story broadcast a two-part profile on Australian media mogul Kerry Packer. The profile detailed the life of Kerry Packer who had died in 2005 after a long and highly influential career. Part two of this profile garnered the highest average audience for 2013–14, with 1.6 million viewers. The profile was of great interest to Australians as it included interviews with particularly powerful men such as John Howard, Malcolm Turnbull and Richard Walsh. The profile also included an interview with Jodhi Meares, Packer's former daughter-in-law, who had never before spoken out about her experience being a part of the Packer family.

== See also ==
- List of Australian television series
- List of programs broadcast by ABC (Australian TV network)
