= Presumed Guilty: When Cops Get It Wrong and Courts Seal the Deal =

Presumed Guilty: When Cops get it Wrong and Courts Seal the Deal
- Author: Bret Christian
- Subject: True crime
- Published: 2013 (Hardie Grant Books)
- Media type: Paperback
- ISBN: 9781742706740

Presumed Guilty: When Cops get it Wrong and Courts Seal the Deal is a non-fiction book by Bret Christian, a veteran newspaper reporter and publisher based in Perth, Western Australia. It centres on a cluster of wrongful murder convictions in Perth. First published in 2013, a second edition was released in 2015.

== Synopsis ==
Part 1 follows a series of crimes, beginning with the suburban 1959 murder of socialite Jillian MacPherson Brewer, and the wrongful conviction of deaf man Darryl Beamish in 1961 for that crime, and his exoneration in 2005.

The most recent case cited is the 2007 murder of Corryn Veronica Ann Rayney in 2007 where the victim's husband Lloyd Rayney was charged and tried for her murder. In an exception to the other cases examined, Lloyd Rayney was found not guilty in 2012, and the verdict upheld on appeal in 2013.

Part 2 is an examination of what went wrong and why with police investigations, the decisions to arrest and charge alleged perpetrators and the subsequent court hearings and jury verdicts. The author documents the historical, evidential, procedural and cognitive problems encountered by the criminal justice system en route to wrongful convictions, and extrapolates to the problems identified in the British common-law system in English-speaking countries. Book reviews, including those by individuals with close associations with the criminal justice system, have been favourable.
