= Caroline Jones (broadcaster) =

Australian radio and television journalist (1938–2022)

Caroline Jones AO
- Born: Caroline Mary James; 1 January 1938; Canberra, Australian Capital Territory, Australia
- Died: 20 May 2022 (aged 84); Sydney, New South Wales, Australia
- Occupation: Radio and TV journalist Social commentator
- Years active: 1963–2022
- Employer: Australian Broadcasting Corporation (1963–2016)
- Known for: This Day Tonight; Four Corners; Australian Story
- Awards: Order of Australia; Australian Living Treasure; Australian Media Peace Prize; Logie Award; Archbishop of Sydney Citation

Caroline Mary Jones AO (born Caroline Mary James; 1 January 1938 – 20 May 2022) was an Australian radio and television journalist and social commentator who had a career in the media industry for over 50 years.

== Early life ==
Jones was born on 1 January 1938 and grew up in Murrurundi, New South Wales.

At age 12, Jones enrolled in SCEGGS Moss Vale Boarding School. During the 1950s, Jones' family moved to the Central Coast and she later attended Gosford High School.

Jones' mother, Nancy Rae James, struggled with mental health issues throughout Jones' childhood. James attempted suicide when Jones was 17, before ultimately taking her life 13 years later.

== Career ==
Jones joined the Australian Broadcasting Commission, now known as the Australian Broadcasting Corporation (ABC), in Canberra in 1963 and later became the first female reporter for the daily This Day Tonight current affairs television program. She then became a presenter on Four Corners, a weekly current affairs television program, from 1972 to 1981. From 1987 to 1994 she presented a spirituality-focused radio program called The Search For Meaning on ABC Radio National, on which she interviewed people about their lives.

In 1996, Jones began hosting the weekly biographical program Australian Story on ABC television.

During 1988, Jones worked alongside Aboriginal broadcasters at Central Australian Aboriginal Media Association in Alice Springs as they produced their first cultural and current affairs programs for television. In 1998 she was appointed an Ambassador for Reconciliation by the Council for Aboriginal Reconciliation.

In December 2016, Jones announced that she would leave the ABC and step down from her role on Australian Story, although stating that she would not be retiring.

Jones was a foundation member of the Australian Council for the Arts, formed in 1973, as well as a foundation member of the Australian Classification Review Board, formed in 1970.

== Personal life ==
Jones married and then divorced early in her adult life.

Jones grew up in a Protestant family. In 1985, Jones was received into the Roman Catholic Church.

Jones died following a fall at her home in Sydney on 20 May 2022, at the age of 84.

== Awards and honours ==
Jones won numerous media awards, including a Logie in 1972 and several Australian Media Peace Prize gold citations. In 2021 she was inducted into the Australian Media Hall of Fame. Jones was made an officer of the Order of Australia in 1988 and in 1989 was awarded the Archbishop of Sydney Citation in recognition of her contribution to Christian ideals in radio and television.

The National Trust of Australia voted Jones an Australian Living Treasure in 1997. In 2007 she was made an Honorary Doctor of Letters (DLitt) by the University of the Sunshine Coast. She also received a Doctor of Letters (honoris causa) degree at the University of Sydney on 6 August 2017.

== Bibliography ==
- The Search for Meaning, ABC and Collins Dove (1989) (based on the radio program of the same name)
- The Search for Meaning, Volume 2, ABC and Collins Dove (October 1990)
- The Search for Meaning – Conversations with Caroline Jones, ABC Books (October 1992)
- The Search for Meaning Collection, ABC Books (1995)
- An Authentic Life: Finding meaning and spirituality in everyday life. ABC Books (1998, 2005)
- Through a Glass Darkly: A Journey of Love and Grief with My Father, ABC Books (2009)
