= Members of the Western Australian Legislative Council, 1832–1870 =

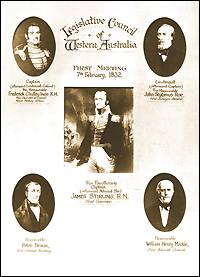
When it first met on 7 February 1832, the Western Australian Legislative Council consisted only of five government officials.

Western Australia was a crown colony from its establishment in 1829 as the Swan River Colony until the advent of representative government in 1870. During this time executive and legislative power was vested in the Governor of Western Australia, but from 1832 he had Executive and Legislative Councils to assist and advise him. The Western Australian Legislative Council met for the first time on 7 February 1832. This is a list of members of the Western Australian Legislative Council between 1832 and 1870.

== Official members, 1832–1870 ==
The Western Australian Legislative Council was initially composed of five ex officio members; that is, members by virtue of their official government positions. These official positions were: the Governor, the Commandant, the Colonial Secretary, the Surveyor-General and the Advocate-General. The Collector of Revenue was added in 1847, and the Comptroller-General in June 1852.

This is a list of official members of the Western Australian Legislative Council between 1832 and 1870. Due to gaps in official records, some dates are approximate and the list may omit some members who were acting in official positions.

Period	Official members						
Period	Governor	Commandant	Colonial Secretary	Surveyor General	Advocate General	Collector of Revenue	Comptroller General
7 February 1832 – 1834	James Stirling	Frederick Irwin	Peter Broun	John Septimus Roe	William Mackie	Not a member until 1847	Not a member until 1852
1834–3 January 1839	James Stirling	Frederick Irwin	Peter Broun	John Septimus Roe	George Fletcher Moore	Not a member until 1847	Not a member until 1852
3 January 1839 – 27 January 1846	John Hutt	Frederick Irwin	Peter Broun	John Septimus Roe	George Fletcher Moore	Not a member until 1847	Not a member until 1852
27 January 1846–November 1846	Andrew Clarke	Frederick Irwin	Peter Broun	John Septimus Roe	George Fletcher Moore	Not a member until 1847	Not a member until 1852
November 1846–May 1847	Andrew Clarke	Frederick Irwin	George Fletcher Moore (acting)	John Septimus Roe	Richard West Nash (acting)	Not a member until 1847	Not a member until 1852
May–June 1847	Andrew Clarke	Frederick Irwin	Dr Richard Robert Madden Richard Robert Madden	John Septimus Roe	George Fletcher Moore	Not a member until 1847	Not a member until 1852
June 1847–12 August 1848	Andrew Clarke	Frederick Irwin	Dr Richard Robert Madden Richard Robert Madden	John Septimus Roe	George Fletcher Moore	Henry Sutherland	Not a member until 1852
12 August 1848–January 1849	Charles Fitzgerald	Frederick Irwin	Dr Richard Robert Madden Richard Robert Madden	John Septimus Roe	George Fletcher Moore	Henry Sutherland	Not a member until 1852
January 1849–March 1850	Charles Fitzgerald	Frederick Irwin	Revett Henry Bland (acting)	John Septimus Roe	George Fletcher Moore	Henry Sutherland	Not a member until 1852
March–October 1850	Charles Fitzgerald	Frederick Irwin	Thomas Yule (acting)	John Septimus Roe	George Fletcher Moore	Henry Sutherland	Not a member until 1852
October 1850–March 1851	Charles Fitzgerald	Frederick Irwin	Charles Piesse	John Septimus Roe	George Fletcher Moore	Henry Sutherland	Not a member until 1852
March 1851 – 1852	Charles Fitzgerald	Frederick Irwin	Thomas Yule (acting)	John Septimus Roe	George Fletcher Moore	Henry Sutherland	Not a member until 1852
1852	Charles Fitzgerald	Frederick Irwin	Thomas Yule (acting)	John Septimus Roe	Bartholemew Vigors (acting)	Henry Sutherland	Edmund Henderson
January 1852 – 1854	Charles Fitzgerald	Frederick Irwin	William Sanford	John Septimus Roe	Bartholemew Vigors (acting)	Henry Sutherland	Edmund Henderson
1854–1855	Charles Fitzgerald	G. M. Reeves	William Sanford	John Septimus Roe	Richard Birnie	Henry Sutherland	Edmund Henderson
1855	Charles Fitzgerald	John Bruce	William Sanford	John Septimus Roe	Richard Birnie	Richard Broun	Edmund Henderson
1855–July 1855	Charles Fitzgerald	John Bruce	William Sanford	John Septimus Roe	Richard Birnie	Anthony O'Grady Lefroy	Edmund Henderson
July–23 July 1855	Charles Fitzgerald	John Bruce	Frederick Barlee	John Septimus Roe	Richard Birnie	Anthony O'Grady Lefroy	Edmund Henderson
23 July 1855 – 1857	Arthur Edward Kennedy	John Bruce	Frederick Barlee	John Septimus Roe	Richard Birnie	Anthony O'Grady Lefroy	Edmund Henderson
1857–1859	Arthur Edward Kennedy	John Bruce	Frederick Barlee	John Septimus Roe	George Stone (acting)	Anthony O'Grady Lefroy	Edmund Henderson
1859–28 February 1862	Arthur Edward Kennedy	John Bruce	Frederick Barlee	John Septimus Roe	George Stone	Anthony O'Grady Lefroy	Edmund Henderson
28 February 1862 – 31 January 1863	John Hampton	John Bruce	Frederick Barlee	John Septimus Roe	George Stone	Anthony O'Grady Lefroy	Edmund Henderson
31 January 1863–May 1866	John Hampton	John Bruce	Frederick Barlee	John Septimus Roe	George Stone	Anthony O'Grady Lefroy	William Newland
May 1866–1 November 1868	John Hampton	John Bruce	Frederick Barlee	John Septimus Roe	George Stone	Anthony O'Grady Lefroy	George Hampton (acting)
2 November 1868–30 September 1869	John Bruce (acting)	John Bruce	Frederick Barlee	John Septimus Roe	George Stone	Anthony O'Grady Lefroy	Henry Wakeford
30 September 1869 – 1870	Frederick Weld	John Bruce	Frederick Barlee	John Septimus Roe	George Stone	Anthony O'Grady Lefroy	Henry Wakeford

== Unofficial nominee members, 1839–1867 ==
In 1839 provision was made for the addition of four non-official nominee positions on the Legislative Council. The first four nominee members were sworn in on 4 March 1839. This is a list of non-official nominee members of the Legislative Council between 1839 and 1867.

Period	Nominee members			
4 March 1839 – 1840	William Locke Brockman	George Leake	Thomas Peel	William Tanner
1840-May 1840	vacant	George Leake	Thomas Peel	William Tanner
May 1840-31 March 1841	Edward Barrett-Lennard	George Leake	Thomas Peel	William Tanner
31 March–April 1841	Edward Barrett-Lennard	George Leake	vacant	William Tanner
April–July 1841	Edward Barrett-Lennard	George Leake	Thomas Yule	William Tanner
July 1841 – 1842	Edward Barrett-Lennard	George Leake	William Mackie (acting)	William Tanner
1842–June 1842	vacant	George Leake	William Mackie (acting)	William Tanner
June–July 1842	vacant	George Leake	Thomas Yule	William Tanner
July 1842 – 1843	William Mackie	George Leake	Thomas Yule	William Tanner
1843–March 1844	William Mackie	George Leake	Thomas Yule	vacant
March 1844 – 1846	William Mackie	George Leake	Thomas Yule	Francis Singleton
1846–1847	William Mackie	George Leake	Thomas Yule	vacant
1847–June 1847	William Mackie	George Leake	vacant	vacant
June–September 1847	William Mackie	George Leake	vacant	Walter Andrews
September 1847 – 1848	William Mackie	George Leake	vacant	vacant
1848–October 1848	William Mackie	George Leake	Richard Nash	vacant
October 1848–31 May 1849	William Mackie	George Leake	Richard Nash	Samuel Moore
31 May–July 1849	William Mackie	vacant	Richard Nash	Samuel Moore
July–December 1849	William Mackie	vacant	Richard Nash	vacant
December 1849 – 1850	William Mackie	Lionel Samson	Richard Nash	vacant
1850–December 1850	William Mackie	Lionel Samson	Richard Nash	Marshall Waller Clifton
December 1850–May 1851	William Mackie	Lionel Samson	Thomas Brown (acting)	Marshall Waller Clifton
May 1851–May 1852	William Mackie	Lionel Samson	Thomas Brown	Marshall Waller Clifton
May 1852–March 1855	William Mackie	Lionel Samson	William Clifton	Marshall Waller Clifton
March 1855–October 1856	William Mackie	Lionel Samson	John Wall Hardey	Marshall Waller Clifton
October 1856–March 1857	William Mackie	vacant	John Wall Hardey	Marshall Waller Clifton
March–June 1857	Samuel Pole Phillips (acting)	Edward Hamersley	John Wall Hardey	Marshall Waller Clifton
June 1857–April 1859	Samuel Pole Phillips	Edward Hamersley	John Wall Hardey	Marshall Waller Clifton
April–October 1859	Samuel Pole Phillips	Edward Hamersley	John Wall Hardey	vacant
October 1859 – 1867	Samuel Pole Phillips	Edward Hamersley	John Wall Hardey	Lionel Samson

== Unofficial nominee members, 1868–1870 ==
During the 1860s there was much public debate about the possibility of instituting representative government. This culminated in June 1865 with the submission of a petition to the Legislative Council asking for a larger and partially elected Legislative Council. As a compromise, the Legislative Council sought permission to add two more nominee members. This permission was received in September 1867, but the Governor then went further by allowing the colony to informally elect six persons whom he would then nominate to the Legislative Council. The colony was divided into six districts: Perth, Fremantle, Guildford, Eastern Districts, Murray and Champion Bay. The first five of these district elected representatives who were then nominated to the Legislative Council as promised. The Champion Bay district, which had led the push for representative government, refused to participate in what it saw as a sham election, so the Governor nominated to the final seat his ally John Wall Hardey, who had polled only four votes in the Guildford district election. This arrangement prevailed until July 1870, when the Legislative Council was reconstituted under a system of representative government.

Period	Unofficially elected					Nominated
Period	Perth	Fremantle	Guildford	Eastern Districts	Murray	Nominated
July 1868–May 1870	Julian Carr	Walter Bateman	William Locke Brockman	Samuel Pole Phillips	James Lee Steere	John Wall Hardey
May–August 1870	Julian Carr	Edward Newman	William Locke Brockman	Samuel Pole Phillips	James Lee Steere	John Wall Hardey
