= The Railway Detective =

2004 mystery novel by Keith Miles

- A Detective Inspector Colbeck Mystery
- Author: Edward Marston (Keith Miles)
- Language: English
- Series: Railway Detective
- Genre: Detective, Mystery novel
- Publisher: Allison & Busby
- Publication date: 2004
- Publication place: United Kingdom
- Media type: Print (hardcover)
- Pages: 348 pp (hardcover edition)
- ISBN: 978-0-7490-8352-6
- Preceded by: none
- Followed by: The Excursion Train

The Railway Detective is the eponymous opening title in the series of detective mystery novels written by Keith Miles under the pseudonym Edward Marston. Set in 1851, it is about a railway robbery which is investigated and ultimately solved by two Scotland Yard detectives, Inspector Robert Colbeck and Sergeant Victor Leeming. The novel was published in 2004 by Allison & Busby of London. The book's cover depicts part of The Railway Station (1862) by William Powell Frith. According to the publishers in a 2018 news release, the series has been optioned for television adaptation by Mammoth Screen.

== Plot introduction ==
In April 1851, shortly before the opening of the Great Exhibition at the Crystal Palace in Hyde Park, London, a mail train on the London and North Western Railway (L&NWR) is halted between Leighton Buzzard Junction and Linslade Tunnel by a group of men disguised as railway police. Using duplicated Chubb safe keys, they steal all the mailbags and a consignment of over £3,000 in sovereigns being transferred from the Royal Mint to a bank in Birmingham. The train driver, who tries to resist the robbers, is badly injured and his fireman is forced to drive the engine forward to where a section of track has been removed, causing a derailment. The robbers escape and the alarm is raised by telegraph to the Metropolitan Police Force in Scotland Yard, London, where it is received by Detective Superintendent Edward Tallis, head of the Detective Department.

== Plot summary ==
Tallis summons Detective Inspector Robert Colbeck to his office and orders him to lead the investigation. It is quickly established that there is an "unresolved tension" between Tallis and Colbeck which is an underlying theme of the whole series, although the two have great professional respect for each other. Colbeck and Detective Sergeant Victor Leeming travel to Leighton Buzzard where they meet Inspector Rory McTurk of the railway police. McTurk strongly resents their involvement but Colbeck and Leeming soon establish that members of the railway police were guilty of deserting their posts on the train in order to play cards, thus making it much easier for the gang to carry out the robbery. Meanwhile, train driver Caleb Andrews is not expected to survive and his daughter Madeleine arrives in Leighton Buzzard to care for him.

Colbeck is convinced that the gang had inside information and were certainly in possession of duplicated safe keys. He and Leeming begin enquiries at the organisations involved with the shipment: the L&NWR, the Post Office, the Royal Mint, the fictitious Spurling's Bank in Birmingham and the Chubb factory in Wolverhampton. As a result, they become aware of Daniel Slender, who duplicated the safe keys at Chubb; William Ings of the Post Office, who was involved in the mail train's scheduling; and Albert Woodhead of the Royal Mint, who unwittingly advised Ings of the gold consignment. The L&NWR and the Birmingham bank are absolved of involvement in the crime.

Ings is the first of the suspects to be pursued and Colbeck discovers that he is hiding in the notorious Devil's Acre. To find Ings, Colbeck seeks help from Brendan Mulryne, a former colleague who is now a resident there. Mulryne establishes a connection between Ings and the prostitute Polly Roach but, though he finds Roach, he is too late to prevent the murder of Ings. In due course, Slender meets a similar fate. It is clear to Colbeck that the gang are eliminating loose ends and weak links to remain undetected. Colbeck is concerned about the unnecessary destruction of the steam engine after the robbery and believes he is looking for someone with influence who hates the railways.

Although Tallis dismisses Colbeck's theory, it is valid as gang leader Sir Humphrey Gilzean has an obsessive hatred of railways. He blames them for the accidental death of his wife. The gang strikes again at the Kilsby Tunnel, placing gunpowder at one end in a bid to destroy both the tunnel and a train carrying glass sheets for use in the Crystal Palace. The explosion is detonated too soon to destroy the train and causes only superficial damage to the tunnel. Colbeck makes the connection and realises, despite more opposition from Tallis, that an attempt will be made to destroy the locomotives on display at the Great Exhibition.

Colbeck is right about the Crystal Palace and, aided by Leeming and Mulryne, is able to arrest Jukes and the Seymours one night when they try to destroy the Lord of the Isles. The gangsters refuse to give information about their leaders. Gilzean and Sholto have added to their haul by blackmailing the senders of complicit letters which were in the stolen mailbags. They are fearful of imminent arrest and Gilzean instructs Sholto to find someone whom Colbeck cares about to distract him from the investigation. Caleb Andrews is no longer a critical case and has been taken home where Madeleine is looking after him. She has met Colbeck in the course of the investigation and there is a mutual attraction between them which develops as the novel progresses. Sholto follows Colbeck and observes the affection he has for Madeleine during a visit to the Andrews household. As a result, Gilzean and Sholto kidnap Madeleine and send a demand to the Met for the release of Jukes and the Seymours.

Working on what little is known about the three prisoners, Colbeck and Leeming discover their common military background and make the link between them and two of their former officers who both left the Army on the same day. These are Gilzean and Sholto. Colbeck establishes that Gilzean has a pathological hatred of railways and even Tallis agrees that the case has been solved, so the investigation is now a manhunt but with Madeleine's life at stake. Fortunately for Madeleine, Gilzean is protective of her and will not allow Sholto to molest her. Tallis leads a raid on Gilzean's Berkshire residence but he bungles it and the criminals escape, still holding Madeleine as a hostage.

Colbeck finds documents in Gilzean's house which convince him they are taking Madeleine to Bristol to board ship and flee the country. The criminals are travelling by road and so Colbeck and Leeming go to Bristol via the Great Western Railway (GWR). They arrive first and intercept the two criminals on board their ship in harbour. Madeleine, unharmed, is freed and reunited with her father. The bond between Colbeck and Madeleine is permanent and, when Colbeck receives two complimentary tickets from the grateful Prince Albert for the opening of the Great Exhibition, he invites Madeleine to join him.

== Characters in "The Railway Detective" ==
=== Main characters (all reoccurring) ===
- Robert Colbeck – Detective Inspector working for the Detective Department at Scotland Yard. Described as "conventionally handsome" and aged in his early thirties, he is from a family of cabinetmakers. He dresses fastidiously, as a "dandy", much to the annoyance of Tallis. Having been educated in law, he became a barrister but his life was changed in 1847 by the murder of Helen Milligan, whom he loved (see "Blood on the Line"). He decided that crime prevention and arresting criminals were more important than securing convictions in court. He therefore joined the Met, starting out as a constable on the beat in Hoxton. He was soon promoted and, by 1851, is acknowledged to be the best detective in the force. His success in solving the train robbery earns him the title of "The Railway Detective". Colbeck is unmarried in 1851 but when he meets Madeleine after the train robbery, in which her father was seriously injured, he is immediately attracted to her and their developing relationship is a series theme.
- Victor Leeming – Detective Sergeant working for the Detective Department. Formerly a constable on the beat, he is Colbeck's assistant investigator and, despite polarity in background and character, they are close friends. Leeming is "slightly older" than Colbeck, so mid-thirties in 1851. Unlike Colbeck at this stage of the series, Leeming is married with a young family. His commitment to his family does not sit well with the workaholic Tallis who regards family as a distraction from work. Leeming is described as having an unprepossessing appearance and, having come from one of London's rougher districts, is a tough character who knows how to look after himself. He is nevertheless humorous and, although he is Colbeck's foil to a large extent, he is a highly competent investigator in his own right, his tenacity being a noted attribute. The character of Leeming, especially with the name Victor, is an amalgam of many played by Victor McLaglen. Whereas Colbeck as the eponymous "railway detective" is enthralled by the "Railway Age", Leeming hates travelling by train. He loves horses and often says he would like to be a hansom cab driver.
- Edward Tallis – Detective Superintendent in charge of the Detective Department. A "stout, red-faced man in his fifties", he is a terse, irascible individual who believes firmly in discipline and dedication to duty, characteristics defined by his Army background. A martinet, Tallis is frequently at odds with Colbeck and Leeming because of personality clash, though he actually has enormous respect for them both. In turn, they respect his organisational ability. Tallis achieved the rank of major in the Army but does not use the title as a police officer. He is always Mister or Superintendent. He is a workaholic whose outside the Detective Department are confined to religion and military history. Tallis takes a hard line against crime and is appalled that there are only two capital offences on the statute book.
- Madeleine Andrews – Daughter of Caleb who soon becomes Colbeck's love interest. Madeleine has brown hair and is "attractive, alert, calm and strong-willed". She is in her early twenties and is a talented artist who specialises in steam locomotives, both in drawings and watercolours. She and Colbeck are attracted to each other at their first meeting when Madeleine visits Scotland Yard to offer information about the train robbery case. Colbeck encourages her artistic talent and she soon begins to secure commissions.
- Caleb Andrews – Engine driver who is proud to work for the L&NWR. This pride often surfaces in criticisms of other railway companies and especially of Isambard Kingdom Brunel and the Great Western Railway (GWR). He is a "short, wiry man in his fifties with a suppressed energy". He was widowed five years earlier and is largely reliant upon his daughter Madeleine, who keeps house for him in Camden and "looks after him with a mixture of kindness, cajolery and uncompromising firmness". The latter is necessary because Caleb is opinionated and can be stubborn even when proved wrong. Caleb is nevertheless determined to see Madeleine happily married.
- Brendan Mulryne – A huge, jovial Irishman who loves his beer and a good fight. He was formerly a policeman who shared his beat with Leeming but was discharged from the force because of brawling. He is currently a bouncer at a pub in the Devil's Acre. He has remained a close friend of Colbeck, who tried to save his job in the police, and Leeming.
- Estelle Leeming – Victor's wife who is described, unlike himself, as attractive. It is a happy marriage of erstwhile close friends between whom love has developed gradually. Until the marriage of Colbeck and Madeleine much later in the series, Estelle is an unseen character who is frequently mentioned by her husband. Victor's main reasons for hating long train journeys is that they take him away from Estelle and their two children.

=== Villains ===
- Sir Humphrey Gilzean – Leader of the train robbery gang, he is a man driven by hatred of the railways after his wife was killed in a fall from her horse, which had been spooked by a train whistle. A "tall, striking figure in his late thirties", Gilzean is an aristocrat who is a former soldier and owns land in Berkshire. He has been a Tory MP for the last three years. Gilzean is a paradox, being a murderer who nevertheless insists on "gentlemanly behaviour" towards women. That is why he returns Ings' share of the loot to Maud and why he forbids Sholto to molest Madeleine. Gilzean had been a major in the 10th (North Lincoln) Regiment of Foot and had retired five years earlier.
- Thomas Sholto – The same age as Gilzean, Sholto is tall, well-dressed and has a full beard. Gilzean and Sholto met at school and were afterwards commissioned in the same regiment before serving in India together. Sholto was a captain who retired on the same day as Gilzean. He is now Gilzean's right-hand man and enforcer. He killed Ings and Slender when they met him for their share of the loot.
- William (Bill) Ings – Former Post Office official and one of only four employees who knew about the gold consignment. Ings has sold out to Gilzean and Sholto. Having quit his job and left his wife, Ings is pursuing his gambling habit and living with prostitutes until meeting Sholto for his payout.
- Daniel Slender – Former Chubb official who has duplicated the keys of the safe on the mail train. He has moved to London and is using his new wealth to buy suits tailored in Bond Street.
- Arthur Jukes – Senior gang member who is "a big, bulky man in his thirties with ginger whiskers". Jukes had been a non-commissioned officer (NCO) under Gilzean and Sholto in India.
- Vernon Seymour – Gang member who lives in the notorious Seven Dials district. Formerly a private in the 10th North Lincoln.
- Harry Seymour – Youngest gang member, brother of Vernon Seymour. Formerly a private in the 10th North Lincoln.

=== Other characters ===
- Frank Pike – Caleb's L&NWR fireman when the train is robbed. He is a friend of the Andrews family outside work.
- Rose Pike – Wife of Frank. An unseen character in this novel.
- Rory McTurk – Railway police inspector who is the senior officer at Leighton Buzzard and first on the scene after the train robbery. He is a "huge individual with a black beard and shaggy eyebrows". He strongly resents the involvement of Scotland Yard, believing that he is capable of solving the crime himself.
- Gideon Little – Railway fireman with the L&NWR who is a sometime colleague of Caleb's. He is a would-be suitor for Madeleine. Caleb is in favour of Madeleine marrying a railwayman, but Madeleine has other ideas, especially after meeting Colbeck.
- Mr Hayton – Leighton Buzzard station master.
- Herbert Shipperley – Post Office supervisor responsible for mail coach scheduling. His information, when interviewed by Leeming, posits William Ings as a prime suspect.
- Maud Ings – Wife of Ings, whom he deserted when he became involved in the robbery.
- Polly Roach – Aging prostitute in the Devil's Acre, for whom Ings has deserted Maud. Roach's possessiveness drives him away and he takes up with Kate Piercy instead. Roach, seeking revenge after being cast aside, finds their bodies.
- Isadore Vout – Miserly moneylender in the Devil's Acre. Ings has borrowed from him but now owes nothing. Vout is obliged to assist Mulryne in his search for Ings and Roach.
- Ernest Kitson – Manager of the fictitious Spurling's Bank in Birmingham city centre, the intended destination of the gold shipment. By interviewing Kitson, Colbeck is able to establish that no one at the bank was involved in the robbery.
- Charles Omber – Security official at the Royal Mint who strenuously argues that none of its employees were involved in leaking information to the gang. Leeming's instincts tell him otherwise and Omber eventually has to apologise after the unwitting complicity of Albert Woodhead is revealed.
- Silas Harcutt – Manager at the Chubb factory in Wolverhampton. He resents Colbeck's presence but is forced to admit that traces of wax on the keys of the corresponding safe prove that duplicates were made at Chubb. Harcutt names Daniel Slender as one of the people authorised to use the safe keys.
- Kate Piercy – Young prostitute with whom Ings is co-habiting when he is due to meet Sholto again. Piercy is in the wrong place at the wrong time and is killed as a witness to Ings' murder.
- Lord Holcroft – Tory politician with a mistress in Birmingham. The villains have found a compromising letter from him to her in the stolen mailbags. He is one of several people whom they blackmail. Holcroft is forced to pay £500 for the return of his letter.
- Anna Grayle – Unseen character who is Holcroft's mistress.
- Ebenezer Trew – Bond Street tailor whose snobbery annoys Colbeck. He remembers the murdered Slender as a customer but examination of the account reveals that Slender gave Trew a false address.
- Bella Woodhead – Post Office employee seduced by Ings who was seeking access to her father.
- Albert Woodhead – Royal Mint official. Father of Bella who befriended Ings when introduced to him. He unwittingly mentioned the transfer of gold to Ings who advised the robbers. Woodhead is another unseen character.
- Richard Mayne – Senior Commissioner at Scotland Yard. The only real person playing an active part in the novel.

== Historical references ==
The Detective Department of the Metropolitan Police Force (the Met) was founded in 1842 and so was only nine years old in 1851, when the story is set. Richard Mayne, who was the joint first commissioner of the Met, is depicted in meetings with Tallis, Colbeck and Leeming. His co-commissioner, Charles Rowan, had retired the year before. Mayne was in charge of policing at The Great Exhibition which opened on 1 May and was an outstanding success, thanks in no small part to effective policing. Mayne is the only real person who plays an active part in the novel.

The novel mentions Prince Albert as the exhibition organiser and Joseph Paxton as its main designer. Gilzean's hatred of Paxton was because of Paxton being a director of the Midland Railway, whose chairman John Ellis is an enemy of Gilzean. The Lord of the Isles was a noted locomotive which was displayed at the Great Exhibition before it entered service on the Great Western Railway (GWR). Colbeck mentions the 6-2-0 Liverpool, the Puffing Billy and the 4-2-2 Iron Duke in the context of the exhibition. In the second book, when Madeleine begins to seriously pursue her hobby of locomotive artworks, the Lord of the Isles is her first subject.

Caleb Andrews drives for the L&NWR but his train was travelling on the route built by the London and Birmingham Railway (L&BR) and opened in 1838. The L&BR was amalgamated into the L&NWR in 1846, having been operational since 1833. Robert Stephenson was the L&BR chief engineer. The line from Euston to Birmingham included the Linslade and Kilsby tunnels which both feature prominently in the book. Marston describes the problems Stephenson faced at Kilsby, where quicksand was unexpectedly encountered. The Crystal Palace's construction materials, its cast iron framework and sheets of glass, were manufactured in Birmingham and Smethwick, so they were transported by rail through the Kilsby tunnel to London.

Train robbery was a new phenomenon in the 1850s. There were two in reality before 1851, both on the Bristol and Exeter Railway in 1849. Security was non-existent and the robbers in each case climbed out of their own carriage into the mail van and back. The first major incident was the Great Gold Robbery on the South Eastern Railway in May 1855. The first train robbery in America was by the Reno Gang in Indiana in 1866; there were more infamous robberies in later years by the James–Younger Gang and Butch Cassidy's Wild Bunch.

The Birmingham bank manager, Ernest Kitson, explains to Colbeck the purpose of the Bank Charter Act 1844 which was introduced by the late Robert Peel as prime minister. The Act is often called the "Peel Banking Act". It placed strict limits on the issue of banknotes by individual banks who were required to balance all banknotes in their possession with a requisite supply of gold coin or bullion. In the novel, it is because Spurling's fully complied with these rules that a gold consignment was being sent to them.

On his trip to Birmingham and Wolverhampton, Colbeck is disturbed by seeing the Black Country and afterwards tells Leeming that he now understands exactly what William Blake meant when he wrote about the "dark, satanic mills". Colbeck is nevertheless intrigued by industry, especially the railways, and in conversations he refers to Edward Bury, Thomas Russell Crampton and Daniel Gooch as engineers and locomotive designers he especially admires. Caleb Andrews speaks well of Alexander Allan, who claimed to be the designer of the Crewe type locomotive involved in the robbery. The engine was a 2-4-0 introduced by the L&NWR for freight in 1845. Allan was L&NWR works manager at Crewe Works from 1843 to 1853.
