= Thomas Hill Dixon =

Australian police officer (1816–1880)

1st Superintendent of Convicts for Western Australia
- In office 1850–1859

Personal details
- Born: 20 February 1816 Isle of Man
- Died: 30 January 1880 (aged 63) Staunton Springs, Australia

Thomas Hill Dixon (20 February 1816 – 30 January 1880) was the first Superintendent of Convicts in Western Australia. Together with his superior, the Comptroller General Edmund Henderson, he created a reforming, humane convict regime for Western Australia. Recognition of his achievements has however been eroded by his later indictment on charges of embezzling public moneys.

== Early life ==
Thomas Dixon was born on the Isle of Man on 20 February 1816. The son of an innkeeper, he was given a good education, and at the age of eighteen went to Glasgow to study medicine at the Glasgow Royal Infirmary. By this time, however, his father had died and the family hotel was being run by his mother and older brother. After only six months in Glasgow, Dixon was forced to return home to take the place of his brother, who had fallen seriously ill and would die shortly afterwards. There, he continued to pursue an interest in medicine, spending five years as a pupil of a local doctor.

== Coming of Age and Indebtedness ==
By 1837, Dixon was married to a woman named Eliza Fennella (née Cooke). That year, his mother died and Dixon inherited her estate, only to find that his mother was in such debt that her assets barely covered the costs of her funeral. Pursued by her creditors, Dixon and his wife fled the island.

== Police Service ==
In 1840, when their first daughter was born, they were in Liverpool, but they did not remain there long. In August 1842 the family moved to London, where Dixon joined the Metropolitan Police Force. In 1843 a second daughter was born. Some time afterwards, Dixon's wife left him, for reasons unknown.

== Convict Service ==
In 1847, Dixon applied for a position in the Convict Service. His application was eventually successful, and in 1850 he was appointed Superintendent of Convicts for the Swan River Colony, which had just been declared a penal colony. Dixon travelled to the colony with the first convicts on board the Scindian. Traveling with him were his two children and his "wife". Shortly after their arrival at Fremantle, Dixon's wife was banished to Toodyay "for the good of the Service". As no record of Dixon's second marriage has been found, Stebbing argues that his wife's banishment from Fremantle is most likely attributable to "her exposure as Dixon's common-law wife and not the mother of his children".

Thomas Dixon held the position of Superintendent of Convicts for nine years, running Fremantle Prison and the convict system. Together with the Comptroller General Edmund Henderson, he created a reforming, humane convict system for Western Australia. He instituted a system of training convicts in a trade, and he adapted the marks system used by Alexander Maconochie in Norfolk Island's penal system to Western Australia's legal situation. He was opposed to flogging, and favoured the introduction of female convicts into Western Australia.

== Embezzlement ==
Dixon earned high praise from his superiors for his innovations, but their opinion of him was to change rapidly in April 1859 when he was stood down on admission of the embezzlement of public money. Dixon's had a single account at the bank for both his private and public funds, and there were no proper accounting or auditing procedures. Dixon had been in financial difficulty for some time, and so "it inevitably appeared that he had misappropriated public funds to offset his private expenditure". The Crown then applied to the Insolvency Court for recovery of the money owed, keeping its actions secret from Dixon and his private creditors, apparently with the intention of establishing priority of the public debt over Dixon's private debts.

Eventually, Dixon was indicted on three counts: embezzling £89 of public moneys, converting moneys to his own use, and stealing coins the property of the Queen.

Dixon's defence pointed out a number of flaws in the case, and the court found that the prosecution's case would have to be resubmitted. Dixon was then released pending resubmission.

== Singapore ==
Within three days of his release, Dixon fled the colony on board the schooner Guyon, which was bound for Singapore. From Singapore he made his way to Labuan Island, where he was appointed chief constable. However the appointment required confirmation from the Colonial Office; having received word of Dixon's arrest, trial and escape from Western Australia, the Colonial Office declined to confirm his appointment, and he was asked to resign. He then returned to Singapore for a few years, during which time nothing is known of his life.

== China ==
From around 1862, Dixon was a mercenary with the forces fighting to put down the Taiping Rebellion in China. He fought in the defence of Shanghai for around three years, but his role was not of particular significance. In 1865, Dixon wrote a letter to his daughters from Liverpool. Nothing is known of how he spent the next ten years of his life, but in December 1876 he arrived back at Fremantle on board the Fitzroy. He spent the final years of his life in poor health, living with his eldest daughter Mary and her husband. He died on 30 January 1880 on their property at Staunton Springs near Williams, in Western Australia.
