= Walter Boyd Andrews =

Australian politician

Walter Boyd Andrews (1792 – 12 September 1847) was an early settler in Perth, Western Australia and, briefly, a non-official (i.e. without portfolio) member of the colony's Legislative Council.

== History ==
Andrews and his family arrived in Western Australia from England by the ship Warrior in 1830. He purchased the southern half of Robert Ansell Partridge's 4,388-acre (1,776 ha) property, which he named Daviot Park, for Daviot, the home town of his mother-in-law in Scotland.

Additional land was purchased in the names of his children: Elizabeth C. Andrews, Alexanderina [sic] J. M. Andrews, Walter Boyd Tate Andrews, Henry James Andrews, Francis Jane Andrews, Henrietta M. W. Andrews in 1833 and John William Andrews in 1834.

He was in 1841 a member of the Perth Town Trust and on 8 February 1842 took office as the first elected chairman of the committee that became the City of Perth.

Andrews was associated with Richard W. Nash and John Schoales, jun. in various enterprises and public bodies including

- Children's Friend Society, charged with the ensuring the welfare of minors sent out from England, most to become servants
- Western Australian Steamboat Company, formed to establish water communication along the Swan River
- W. A. Agricultural and Horticultural Society 1845
- Building fund committee for St George's (Anglican) Church, Perth

R. W. Nash was brother-in-law of lawyer John Schoales, jun. (c. 1810–1847), who became Guardian of Juvenile Immigrants. One of Andrews' daughters married a Rev. John W. Schoales, but the relationship (if any) between these two has yet to be found. An assertion that Rev. Schoales emigrated to Perth is without foundation.

=== Arrivals in Adelaide ===
In September 1846, Walter Boyd Andrews and his youngest sons John William Andrews, Richard [sic, see below] Tapley Andrews and Lewis Grant Boyd Andrews sailed to South Australia aboard Joseph Albino and at some stage secured a residence in Gilbert Street. In January 1847, his wife and the remainder of their offspring Elizabeth Christiana Andrews, Alexandrina Isabella Andrews, Walter Boyd Tate Andrews, Frances Jane Andrews, and Henrietta Matilda Wittenoon [sic] Andrews sailed to South Australia on the same ship.

=== Return to Perth ===
Andrews must have returned to Western Australia around this time, as was appointed to the colony's Legislative Council in June 1847, just three months before his death. His remains were interred in the East Perth Cemeteries.

The identity and fate of John William Andrews are not clear. A lad of that name and similar age (c. 1834 – 12 May 1847) was shot dead by a son of Sir Richard Spencer at Lady Ann Warden Spencer's home "Strawberry Hill" on King George Sound. The incident, deemed accidental by the magistrates, was reported in only one newspaper, cursorily, and four weeks after the event. The home may have been the site of the accidental death of Horatio Spencer in 1839.

Walter Boyd Tate Andrews inherited his father's property "Daviot Park", which he sold to George Walpole Leake in 1868.

== Family ==
Andrews married Elizabeth Gordon (17 October 1790 – 8 January 1862) in London on 8 November 1817. their children include:

- Elizabeth Christina Andrews (26 September 1818 – 1899) married George Young at St John's Church, Adelaide on 17 February 1848
- Walter Boyd Tate Andrews I (7 September 1819 – ) baptised; presumably died in infancy
- Alexandria Isabella Muir Andrews (10? 19? July 1821 – )
- Walter Boyd Tate Andrews, jun. (1? 5? May 1823 - 4 April 1899) was in 1840 appointed clerk in the Colonial Secretary's office. In 1847 he moved to South Australia in 1847, where he became a noted public servant and married Isabella Whinham (c. 1838 – 24 August 1931), daughter of John Whinham, on 8 July 1858. They had around eight children, many of whom died young. W. B. T. Andrews was killed in a railway crossing accident at Upper Sturt.
- James Lewis Andrews (3 October 1825 – ) baptised; perhaps died in infancy
- Henry James Andrews (23 April 1827 – 25 April 1890) Under-Secretary for South Australia, married Clarissa Jane Fesenmeyer (1839 – 9 December 1914); she returned to Western Australia after death of her husband, died at her home. Forrest Street, Cottesloe, Western Australia. They had nine children.
- Frances Jane Andrews (26 March 1829 – ) married Rev. John Whitelaw Schoales on 9 Sep 1851
- Henrietta Matilda Wittenoom Andrews (22 November 1831 – 22 February 1848) died at Gilbert Street, Adelaide
- John William Andrews ( – ) see text above.
- Robert Tapley Andrews (1834 – 14 December 1864) married Lydia Yelland ( – 1867) on 9 April 1862. He died of phthisis (tuberculosis) at Gilbert Street. Their two children died as infants. Some references refer to him as "Richard Tapley Andrews"
- Lewis Grant Boyd Andrews (22 February 1838 – 20 January 1849) died at Gilbert Street, Adelaide
- Richard James Andrews (c. 1836 – 21 December 1911) married Susan Higgs in 1864, lived Gilbert Street, published several In Memoriams for brother R. T. Andrews

- Robert Tapley Andrews (1867 – 7 October 1932) married Ada Sophia Dennis (died 1913) on 17 April 1888
