= John W. Schoales =

Rev. John Whitelaw Schoales (1820–1903) was an Anglican priest in the pioneering days of Adelaide, South Australia.

== History ==
Schoales graduated BA at Trinity College Dublin, arrived in South Australia July 1850 aboard Sultana, attached to St John's Church, Adelaide 1850, St Mary's on the Sturt 1851–1854, All Saints Church, Hindmarsh. He left Australia in 1858 and died in England in 1903.

He has been confused with Western Australian barrister and businessman John Schoales jun. (c. 1810 – 10 April 1847), a brother-in-law of Richard West Nash (1808–1850) and son of John Schoales QC (died 1850) of Dublin. John Schoales, jun. was closely identified with programs to settle labourers, servants and orphans into WA. He was appointed Guardian of Juvenile Immigrants (the Parkhurst apprentices, brought in as unskilled labour), withholding their allowances until their 5-year indenture period was over. He was succeeded by F. D. Wittenoom (c. 1821–1863).

On 9 September 1851 Schoales married Frances Jane Andrews, third daughter of Walter Boyd Andrews (c. 1792–1847) of Western Australia, an associate of John Schoales jun. mentioned above. Three children died of dysentery in 1856, another in 1858. Another son, George Lewis Schoales (c. 1861 – 24 June 1888) died in North Adelaide.
