= William Hay (police commissioner) =

Commissioner of Police of the Metropolis from 1850 to 1855

Captain William Hay CB
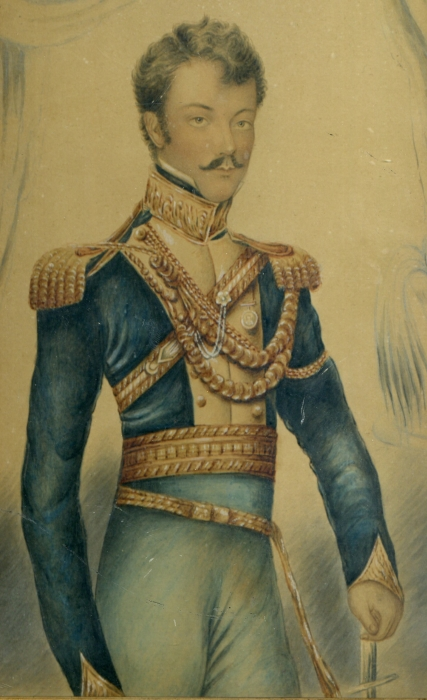
- Hay as an officer of the 12th Light Dragoons, c. 1820

Second Joint Commissioner of Police of the Metropolis
- In office 1850 – 29 August 1855 Serving with Richard Mayne
- Preceded by: Richard Mayne
- Succeeded by: Office Abolished

Personal details
- Born: 1794
- Died: 29 August 1855 (aged 60–61)
- Occupation: British Army officer

Captain William Hay CB (1794 – 29 August 1855) was the second and last junior Joint Commissioner of Police of the Metropolis, one of two heads of the London Metropolitan Police.

== Family ==
He was descended from John Hay, 1st Marquess of Tweeddale (1626–1697), whose third son, Lord Alexander Hay (1663–1737) was his great-grandfather. Alexander married Katherine Kerr, an heiress with property in Berwickshire and East Lothian. Their third son, William (1699–?), married the daughter of Sir Robert Sinclair of Stevenson. William had three sons, including Robert, who later entered the 83rd Regiment of Foot, reached the rank of captain and married Catherine, the daughter of Ralph Babington, of Greenfort, County Donegal, in 1791. They had three children, of whom William was the eldest.

== Military career ==
In 1807, Hay was enrolled into the Royal Military College, Great Marlow. He was commissioned as ensign without purchase, with seniority dated 30 January 1810, in the 52nd Light Infantry.

His first active service occurred in 1810 as the result of threatened disturbances in London following the arrest of Sir Francis Burdett, a reformist politician, who was charged with libelling the House of Commons and sent to the Tower of London. All military units within several days marching of the capital were ordered to and to be quartered in London. The 52nd was ordered up from its base in Chatham and was billeted in a warehouse in Dean Street, Soho. Hay and his unit were to remain in London for three weeks, without incident, before returning to Chatham.

From 1810 to 1811, Hay served with the 52nd Light Infantry during the Peninsular War. On 16 July 1811, while still abroad, he was promoted lieutenant and transferred to the 12th Light Dragoons. Hay continued to serve with the 12th throughout the war and also later at the Battle of Waterloo. He was later to write, for his daughter, a full account of his reminiscences of his time serving Wellington between 1808 and 1815. After the war, he was appointed as aide-de-camp on the staff of the Earl of Dalhousie, then Lieutenant-Governor of Nova Scotia. He took up this post in 1817 and served in the North American Provinces until 1823.

Since 1822, Hay had held the rank of captain with the 37th Regiment of Foot, on half-pay by purchase, and in 1824 he was successful in effecting an appointment as a full-pay captain in the 5th Dragoon Guards. In 1829, Hay retired from military service and married Sarah Sparkes.

== Police career ==
Having then lived for two years in Surrey, followed by seven in Scotland, Hay then came to London, where on 10 December 1839 he took up an appointment as the first inspecting superintendent of the Metropolitan Police. This post was effectively the chief deputy to the two joint commissioners, Lieutenant-Colonel Sir Charles Rowan and Richard Mayne, and broke the rule established by Sir Robert Peel that, apart from the two commissioners, all police officers should be promoted from the ranks. This was not the first time Hay had served under Rowan, who was his senior in the 52nd Light Infantry during the Peninsular War.

In 1849, Hay was awarded the Military General Service Medal with five clasps (Fuentes D’Onor, Vittoria, St Sebastian, Nivelle and Nive) for his service in the war. He was also awarded the Waterloo Medal, which had been instituted by order of the Prince Regent in 1816.

In 1850, on the retirement of Sir Charles Rowan, Hay was made one of the joint commissioners of the Metropolitan Police and sworn in as a Justice of the peace. His position was junior to Richard Mayne, who had been appointed along with Rowan in 1829. Mayne and Hay did not get along, and Hay was soon complaining to the Home Office about his colleague. He was particularly angered that Mayne took personal charge of the policing of the Great Exhibition in 1851, a job which Hay, as a military man, thought should have gone to him. Hay was, however, appointed Companion of the Order of the Bath (CB) in 1851 for his involvement in the Exhibition, although Mayne was appointed to the higher grade of Knight Commander for his involvement at the same time.

In 1852, the crowds coming to pay their respects at the lying-in-state of the Duke of Wellington got out of hand and it was reported that one or two people had been crushed to death. There was criticism of the police, and Hay had a paragraph inserted into the newspapers claiming that Mayne had been responsible. Mayne was, unsurprisingly, furious. In 1853, Hay submitted plans for police reorganisation to the Home Office without first showing them to Mayne.

Hay died at his home, 67 Cadogan Place, on 29 August 1855. His death certificate records the cause as "Scirrhus [a form of cancer] of the Oesophagus and Exhaustion". Following his death, it was decided that thereafter there should be only a single commissioner for the Metropolitan Police, as formalised by the Metropolitan Police Act 1856.

== Footnotes ==
Police appointments
Preceded by First incumbent	Inspecting Superintendent, Metropolitan Police; 1850	Succeeded by Douglas Labalmondière
Preceded by Richard Mayne	Second Joint Commissioner of Police of the Metropolis; 1850–1855	Succeeded by Last incumbent
