= Keith Miles =

Welsh writer (born 1940)

Keith Miles (born 1940) is a Welsh writer of historical fiction and mystery novels. He has also written children's books, radio and television dramas and stage plays. He is best known under the pseudonym Edward Marston, and has also written as Martin Inigo and Conrad Allen.

== Career ==
Miles was born and educated in South Wales. He gained a degree in Modern History from Oxford University and spent three years as a lecturer, before becoming a full-time writer. Miles's early work was as a scriptwriter for television and radio, including series such as Crossroads, Z-Cars and The Archers. Miles was chairman of the Crime Writers' Association for 1997–98. He was previously married to Rosalind Miles and is now married to another mystery writer, Judith Cutler.

=== Mystery fiction written as Keith Miles ===
Beginning in the mid-1980s, Miles turned to writing mystery fiction. His first series, written under his own name, featured Alan Saxon, a professional golfer-turned-amateur detective. After four books, Miles's publisher did not wish to continue the series, which only resumed after a hiatus of more than a decade. He has written two mysteries set in the United States which feature a Welsh architect, Merlin Richards.

The Action Scene series included five books, from Skydive to Frontier; as Miles, he also wrote Not for Glory, Not for Gold, a novel about athletics.

The City Hospital series included ten books, starting with New Blood (1995) and ending with Heart Rate (1996). In 2019, Amazon in the U.S. was giving away the individual e-books of this series at no charge to Kindle Unlimited members.

=== Edward Marston ===
In 1988, Miles began a series set in the theatrical world of Elizabethan London. For this series, and for most of his subsequent writing, he adopted the pseudonym Edward Marston, the name reflecting that of a real Elizabethan playwright, John Marston. The series features a fictional theatrical company, Westfield's Men, and, in particular, Nicholas Bracewell, its book-holder, a position similar to that of the modern stage manager. His next series as Marston was set during the reign of William the Conqueror; its two main characters, surveyors for Domesday Book, are Ralph Delchard, a Norman soldier, and Gervase Bret, a former novice turned lawyer, who is half Saxon and half Breton.

Marston began his Restoration series in 1999 featuring architect/detective Christopher Redmayne and the puritan Constable Jonathan Bale. Six books were written in this series, with the last one, The Painted Lady, released in 2007. In the "Captain Rawson" series, Marston has written about a soldier and spy operating during the military campaigns of the Duke of Marlborough.

In recent years, he began the "Home Front Detective Series", set in London during the First World War; seven had been published as of 2019. His "Bow Street Rivals" series, set in London during the Napoleonic Wars, includes five books as of 2020.

Marston has been most prolific in his "Railway Detective" series, published by Allison & Busby. This is set in the middle of the 19th century against the background of the "Railway Age". It concerns two Scotland Yard detectives, Inspector Robert Colbeck and Sergeant Victor Leeming, whose cases are invariably linked to the railways. Colbeck is a former barrister who is enthralled by the railways and marries a railwayman's daughter. Leeming, in contrast, detests travelling by train and yearns for the days of horse-drawn transport. Beginning with The Railway Detective itself in 2004, there were 20 titles in this series to the end of 2021.

=== Other pseudonyms ===
Miles has used three other pseudonyms: Martin Inigo, Conrad Allen and David Garland. As Allen, he wrote about the private detectives George Porter Dillman and Genevieve Masefield, who operated aboard ocean liners of the early 20th century. There were eight books in this series, starting with Murder on the Lusitania (1999) and concluding with Murder on the Celtic (2007). As Garland he wrote novels about the American Revolutionary War, Saratoga and Valley Forge. He also wrote several other types of books as Garland.

He used the pseudonym Christopher Mountjoy for three books in the 1980s, Coming of Age, Queen and Country and The Honourable Member.

== Bibliography ==
=== As Keith Miles ===
- Warrior Kings (1978)
- The Alan Saxon series
  1. Bullet Hole (1986)
  2. Double Eagle (1987)
  3. Green Murder (1990)
  4. Flagstick (1991)
  5. Bermuda Grass (2002)
  6. Honolulu Play-Off (2004)
- The Action series
  1. Skydive (1987)
  2. Seabird (1987)
  3. Bushranger (1987)
  4. Snowstorm (1988)
  5. Frontier (1989)
- The City Hospital series
  1. New Blood (1995)
  2. Flames (1995)
  3. Fever (1995)
  4. Emergency (1995)
  5. Coma (1995)
  6. Target (1995)
  7. Stress (1996)
  8. X-Ray (1996)
  9. Highrise (1996)
  10. Heart Rate (1996)
- The Merlin Richards series, Set in the late 1920s. Merlin is a bored young Welsh architect who seeks his fortune in the US, hopefully working for the famous American architect Frank Lloyd Wright. Merlin's strong sense of morality means that when crimes happen around him he won't just leave it to the police to solve!
  1. Murder in Perspective (1997)
  2. Saint's Rest (1999)

=== As Edward Marston ===
- The Elizabethan Theatre series, featuring Nicholas Bracewell, stage manager (and amateur detective) for one of Elizabethan London leading theatrical companies:
  1. The Queen's Head (1988)
  2. The Merry Devils (1989)
  3. The Trip to Jerusalem (1990)
  4. The Nine Giants (1991)
  5. The Mad Courtesan (1992)
  6. The Silent Woman (1992)
  7. The Roaring Boy (1995) (nominated for the Edgar Award for Best Novel, 1996)
  8. The Laughing Hangman (1996)
  9. The Fair Maid of Bohemia (1997)
  10. The Wanton Angel (1999)
  11. The Devil's Apprentice (2001)
  12. The Bawdy Basket (2002)
  13. The Vagabond Clown (2003)
  14. The Counterfeit Crank (2004)
  15. The Malevolent Comedy (2005)
  16. The Princess of Denmark (2006)
- The Domesday series, featuring Ralph Delchard and Gervase Bret, commissioners appointed by William the Conqueror, to look into the serious irregularities that come to light during the compilation of the Domesday Book, the great survey of England:
  1. The Wolves of Savernake (1993)
  2. The Ravens of Blackwater (1994)
  3. The Dragons of Archenfield (1995)
  4. The Lions of the North (1996)
  5. The Serpents of Harbledown (1996)
  6. The Stallions of Woodstock (1997)
  7. The Hawks of Delamere (1998)
  8. The Wildcats of Exeter (1998)
  9. The Foxes of Warwick (1999)
  10. The Owls of Gloucester (2000)
  11. The Elephants of Norwich (2000)
- The Restoration series, featuring architect Christopher Redmayne and Constable Jonathan Bale, set in 1660s/70s London:
  1. The King's Evil (1999)
  2. The Amorous Nightingale (2000)
  3. The Repentant Rake (2001)
  4. The Frost Fair (2003)
  5. The Parliament House (2006)
  6. The Painted Lady (2007)
- The Railway Detective series, featuring Scotland Yard detectives Inspector Robert Colbeck and Sergeant Victor Leeming, set in the 1850s and 60s:
  1. The Railway Detective (2004)
  2. The Excursion Train (2005)
  3. The Railway Viaduct (2006)
  4. The Iron Horse (2007)
  5. Murder on the Brighton Express (2008)
  6. The Silver Locomotive Mystery (2009)
  7. Railway to the Grave (2010)
  8. Blood on the Line (2011)
  9. The Stationmaster's Farewell (2012)
  10. Peril on the Royal Train (2013)
  11. Inspector Colbeck's Casebook: Thirteen Tales from the Railway Detective (2014)
  12. A Ticket to Oblivion (2014)
  13. Timetable of Death (2015)
  14. Signal for Vengeance (2016)
  15. The Circus Train Conspiracy (2017)
  16. A Christmas Railway Mystery (2017)
  17. Points of Danger (2018)
  18. Fear on the Phantom Special (2019)
  19. Slaughter in the Sapperton Tunnel (2020)
  20. Tragedy on the Branch Line (2021)
  21. The Railway Detective's Christmas Case (2022)
  22. Death at the Terminus (2023)
  23. Murder in Transit (2024)
  24. Mystery at the Station Hotel (2025)
  25. Murder on the Great Northern Railway (2025)
  26. The Corpse on the Bristol Train (2026)

[The first three above-mentioned in this series are available in an omnibus edition]

- The Captain Rawson series, featuring Captain Daniel Rawson, soldier and spy, set around the period of the War of the Spanish Succession:
  1. Soldier of Fortune (2008)
  2. Drums of War (2008)
  3. Fire and Sword (2009)
  4. Under Siege (2010)
  5. A Very Murdering Battle (2011)
- The Home Front Detective Series, featuring Inspector Harvey Marmion and Sergeant Joe Keedy, set in WWI.
  1. A Bespoke Murder (2011)
  2. Instrument of Slaughter (2012)
  3. Five Dead Canaries (2013)
  4. Deeds of Darkness (2014)
  5. Dance of Death (2015)
  6. The Enemy Within (2016)
  7. Under Attack (2017)
  8. The Unseen Hand (2019)
  9. Orders to Kill (2021)
  10. Danger of Defeat (2023)
  11. Spring Offensive (2024)
- The Bow Street Rivals series
  1. Shadow of the Hangman (2015)
  2. Steps to the Gallows (2016)
  3. Date with the Executioner (2017)
  4. Fugitive from the Grave (2018)
  5. Rage of the Assassin (2020)
- Short Story Collections
  1. Perfect Shadows' (1999)
  2. Murder, Ancient and Modern (Crippen & Landru, 2005)
- Non-fiction (Crime studies)
  1. John Christie. Surrey: The National Archives. ISBN 978-1-905615-16-2.

=== As Martin Inigo ===
- The Don Hawker series
  1. Stone Dead (1991)
  2. Touch Play (1991)

=== As Conrad Allen ===
- The Dillman and Masefield series, featuring private detectives George Porter Dillman and Genevieve Masefield, and set on board ocean liners of the early 1900s. This series has subsequently been reprinted credited to Edward Marston:
  1. Murder on the Lusitania (1999)
  2. Murder on the Mauretania (2000)
  3. Murder on the Minnesota (2002)
  4. Murder on the Caronia (2002)
  5. Murder on the Marmora (2004)
  6. Murder on the Salsette (2005)
  7. Murder on the Oceanic (2006)
  8. Murder on the Celtic (2007)

=== As David Garland ===
- The American Revolutionary War series, featuring Captain Jamie Skoyles, set during the American Revolutionary War:
  1. Saratoga (2005)
  2. Valley Forge: A Novel of the American Revolution (2006)
