= Edmund Henderson =

British army and police officer

Lieutenant-Colonel Sir Edmund Henderson KCB
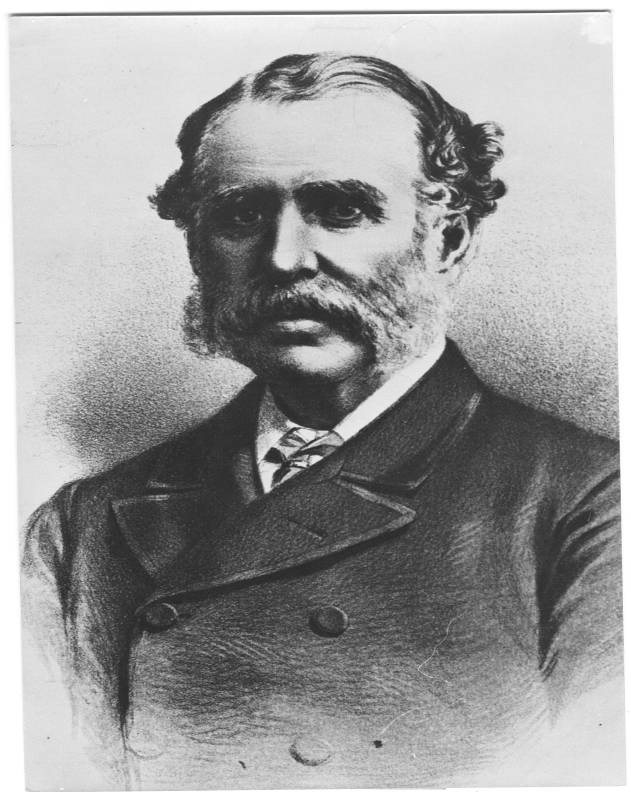

Commissioner of Police of the Metropolis
- In office 1869 – 22 February 1886
- Preceded by: Douglas Labalmondière
- Succeeded by: Charles Warren

Personal details
- Born: Edmund Yeamans Walcott Henderson; 19 April 1821 Muddiford, Hampshire, England
- Died: 8 December 1896 (aged 75)
- Occupation: soldier, administrator, police commissioner

Lieutenant-Colonel Sir Edmund Yeamans Walcott Henderson KCB (19 April 1821 – 8 December 1896) was an officer in the British Army who was Comptroller-General of Convicts in Western Australia from 1850 to 1863, Home Office Surveyor-General of Prisons from 1863 to 1869, and Commissioner of Police of the Metropolis, head of the London Metropolitan Police, from 1869 to 1886.

== Military career ==
Henderson was born in Muddiford, near Christchurch, Hampshire, England, the son of Vice-Admiral George Henderson of the Royal Navy and Frances Elizabeth Walcott-Sympson. His brother William George Henderson was Dean of Carlisle. He was educated in Bruton, Somerset and the Royal Military Academy at Woolwich. He was commissioned Second Lieutenant in the Royal Engineers on 6 June 1838 and was promoted First Lieutenant in 1840, Second Captain in 1847, First Captain in 1854, Brevet Major in 1858, and Lieutenant-Colonel in 1862.

He undertook his professional training at Chatham and was then posted to Canada in 1839. He returned to England in 1845 and spent a year in Portsmouth before being posted back to Canada in June 1846. At the age of 26, while still a lieutenant, he was chosen as a commissioner to settle the boundary between Nova Scotia and New Brunswick. In this service, his fellow commissioner lost his life, and Henderson barely escaped the same fate having been five days without food, and was in charge of surveying the western half of the boundary between Canada and New Brunswick, which had been ceded to Britain by the United States, until November 1848, when he returned to England with his new wife, Mary Murphy, whom he had married in Canada. He spent the next two years based at Gravesend.

== Comptroller-General of Convicts and Director of Prisons ==
When Western Australia became a penal colony in 1850, Henderson was appointed the colony's first Comptroller-General of Convicts. He travelled to Western Australia with the first convicts on board the Scindian, arriving on 1 June 1850. He found the colony completely unprepared for the convicts, lacking even a jail large enough to house them. Henderson secured lodging for the convicts at a ware house owned by Captain Scott, the harbour master. Henderson then began construction of a place for the warders to stay and in time the Convict Establishment, later known as Fremantle Prison. He was "a kindly and just man, moderate and understanding, opposed to the harsher forms of discipline. He thought that flogging as a punishment did more harm than good, and might be abolished except in rare cases, and that putting men in chains was useless and aggravating."^{1}

Henderson married Mary Murphy in 1848. Following her death in 1855, he visited England with his son the following year and in 1857 married Maria Hindle. Henderson returned to Australia in 1858. He finally resigned as Comptroller-General of Convicts and left the colony in January 1863.

On his return to Britain, he was appointed Chairman of Directors and Surveyor-General of Prisons and Inspector-General of Military Prisons on 29 July 1863, succeeding Sir Joshua Jebb. He sold his army commission in 1864 and was made a Companion of the Bath (CB) in 1868.

== Commissioner of Police ==
In 1869, Henderson was appointed to succeed Sir Richard Mayne as second sole Commissioner of Police of the Metropolis. He was an ideal compromise candidate between those who wanted a military man as Commissioner and those who thought the job should go to a civilian. Although a former army officer, Henderson had served in civilian appointments for the last eighteen years. He was also unknown to the British public, allowing him to establish a reputation only on his achievements as Commissioner.

Henderson immediately endeared himself to his men by abolishing or relaxing some of the petty regulations imposed by Mayne and his first colleague, Sir Charles Rowan. For the first time, for instance, officers were permitted to grow facial hair. They were also allowed to vote for the first time, having initially been prevented by regulations forbidding them to take part in political activity. Henderson clashed with Receiver Maurice Drummond over an increase in pay for his men, a rivalry which was to continue for the rest of his tenure.

In order to spread his constables more widely and make them more available, Henderson established the fixed point system. He increased the Detective Branch to over 200 men and started the Habitual Criminals Register. He grouped the Divisions into Districts and introduced Schoolmaster Sergeants in each division to increase the literacy of his constables.

However, Henderson faced problems. The authorities decided, against his advice, to reduce pensions and this, coupled with low wages, led to the first police strike in 1872. The Commissioner dealt with the situation efficiently, dismissing the ringleaders and then allowing most of them to rejoin the force. Although the reputation of the Met was harmed by this incident, Henderson himself was not criticised by the press. He faced an even more serious situation in 1877, when four senior officers of the Detective Branch were put on trial for corruption (Trial of the Detectives), but survived it with his reputation intact. In 1878, he was made a Knight Commander of the Bath (KCB).

But, by this stage, Henderson was starting to lose his control of the force. He ignored the fact that the District Superintendents were becoming ineffective and that two of the four posts had fallen vacant. When the Fenian bombing campaign opened in 1883, he left its handling largely to his assistants, particularly Howard Vincent, James Monro and Robert Anderson. On 8 February 1886, the mishandling of the Trafalgar Square Riot exposed his inefficiency, and on 22 February the Home Secretary Hugh Childers accepted his resignation.

== Notes ==
1. Hasluck (1959), page 56.

Government offices
| Preceded by First incumbent | Comptroller-General of Convicts in Western Australia; 1850–1863 | Succeeded by William Newland |
| Preceded by Sir Joshua Jebb | Chairman of Directors and Surveyor-General of Prisons and Inspector-General of Military Prisons; 1863–1869 | Succeeded by Edmund Du Cane |
Police appointments
| Preceded by Douglas Labalmondière (Acting) | Commissioner of Police of the Metropolis; 1869–1886 | Succeeded by Sir Charles Warren |
