= Frederick Barlee =

British colonial administrator (1827-1884)

Sir Frederick Barlee KCMG
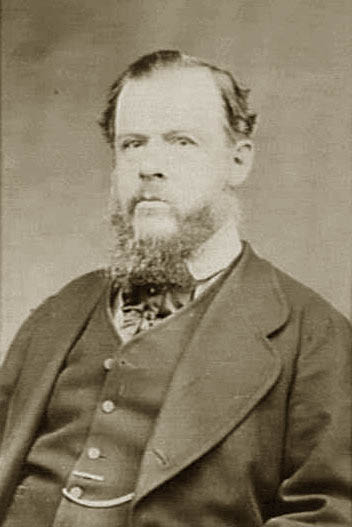

Clerk to the Executive and Legislative Councils & Private secretary to the Governor of Sierra Leone
- In office 1853–1855

Colonial Secretary of Western Australia & Nominated MLC
- In office July 1855 – 24 November 1875

British Honduras Lieutenant Governor
- In office March 1877 – September 1882

Trinidad Administrator
- In office April 1884 – August 1884

Personal details
- Born: 6 February 1827 Worlingworth, Suffolk, England
- Died: 8 August 1884 (aged 57) Port of Spain, Trinidad

Sir Frederick Palgrave Barlee KCMG (6 February 1827 – 8 August 1884) was Colonial Secretary of Western Australia from 1855 to 1875; Lieutenant-Governor of the British Honduras (now Belize) from 1877 to 1882; and Administrator of Trinidad in 1884.

Frederick Barlee was born in Worlingworth, Suffolk, England on 6 February 1827. He was educated privately and at local schools, and in 1845 he entered the public service as a clerk to the Ordnance Department in Chatham and Woolwich. In 1851, Barlee married Jane Oseland. Later that year he was posted to Sierra Leone, where he served initially as a barrack-master and storekeeper. In 1853 he became clerk to the Executive and Legislative Councils, and private secretary to the Governor of Sierra Leone Arthur Edward Kennedy.

In 1855, Kennedy was appointed Governor of Western Australia, and he arranged for Barlee to be appointed Colonial Secretary. Both men arrived in Western Australia in June 1855, and commenced work the following month. As colonial secretary, Barlee became a nominated member of the Western Australian Legislative Council. Kennedy immediately embarked on a range of reforms, with Barlee largely responsible for their implementation. Kennedy's reforms were unpopular, and Barlee made numerous enemies during this time. However, by 1856 Barlee and Kennedy had fallen out; after this, Barlee often opposed Kennedy on important issues, and his influence declined.

From January 1856 to March 1857, Barlee was Acting Commissioner of Police.

In 1862, Governor Kennedy was succeeded by Governor John Hampton, and Barlee returned to a position of influence. In 1863, he became permanent chairman of the Board of Education. The following year he gave Bishop Matthew Hale financial help in establishing the Bishop's Collegiate School (now Hale School), and was appointed first Governor of the school. That year, he also invested in the unsuccessful attempt to establish a pastoral settlement at Roebuck Bay. Eventually, Barlee again fell out of favour with the governor, this time through disagreements over the treatment of convicts, and the management of the convict system in general. During the period from November 1868 to September 1869 Colonel John Bruce was acting governor and there was a great deal of friction between Bruce and Barlee.

John Bruce was replaced by Frederick Weld in 1869, and Barlee again became an influential figure. Weld and Barlee shared an enthusiasm for representative government, and together they worked to promote it. Largely due to their efforts, Western Australia obtained representative government in May 1870. Under the new system of government, Barlee became the most powerful person in the colony other than Weld himself.

In 1873, Barlee began to work for early achievement of responsible government. Both directly and through a newspaper that he had recently bought a stake in, Barlee agitated for responsible government, and in 1874 the Legislative Council passed a resolution calling for the constitutional change. Although Weld did not think that Western Australia was yet ready for responsible government, he accepted the situation and passed on the request to the Colonial Office in London. The Colonial Office were strongly against granting responsible government, and were critical of Weld for allowing the situation to arise. Shortly afterwards, Weld was transferred to Tasmania. Barlee, perhaps anticipating a transfer, took long service leave and left for England in July 1875. In his absence, the demand for responsible government receded, and it would not be granted until 1890.

Barlee remained nominal colonial secretary for another eighteen months, and intended to return to the position unless he was offered a better appointment elsewhere. In 1877, he was made CMG. Also in 1877, he was appointed Lieutenant-Governor of British Honduras (now Belize), a position that he held until 1882. After briefly visiting Western Australia to attend to some investments, he returned to England to await his next posting. He was made KCMG in 1883, but had to wait until April 1884 for his next posting, as Administrator of Trinidad. Barlee arrived at Port of Spain, Trinidad and took up his appointment in June 1884, but died from asthma just seven weeks later on 8 August 1884. Barlee had married in 1851, Jane, daughter of Edward John Oseland, of Coleraine, Ireland, who survived him.

Barlee was elected a member of the American Antiquarian Society in 1878.
