= Alexander Carmichael Bruce =

Sir Alexander Carmichael Bruce

Assistant Commissioner of Police of the Metropolis "A"
- In office 10 December 1888 – 1914

Personal details
- Born: 6 September 1850 Ferryhill, County Durham, England
- Died: 26 October 1926 (aged 76)
- Occupation: Barrister

Sir Alexander Carmichael Bruce (6 September 1850 – 26 October 1926) was a British barrister who served as the second Assistant Commissioner "A" of the London Metropolitan Police, from 1888 to 1914.

Bruce was born in Ferryhill, County Durham, the fourth son of Canon David Bruce. He attended Rossall School in Lancashire and then Brasenose College, Oxford, graduating in 1873 and being called to the Bar at Lincoln's Inn in 1875. He practised on the North-Eastern Circuit until 10 December 1888, when he was appointed Assistant Commissioner. He was knighted on 18 July 1903 and retired in 1914.

Bruce married Helen Fletcher (later Dame Helen Bruce) in 1876. He lived at 82 Lexham Gardens, Kensington.

== Footnotes ==
Police appointments
Preceded by Douglas Labalmondière	Assistant Commissioner "A", Metropolitan Police; 1888–1914	Succeeded by Frank Elliott
