= Douglas Labalmondière =

British Army officer and senior police officer

Lieutenant-Colonel Douglas Labalmondière CB
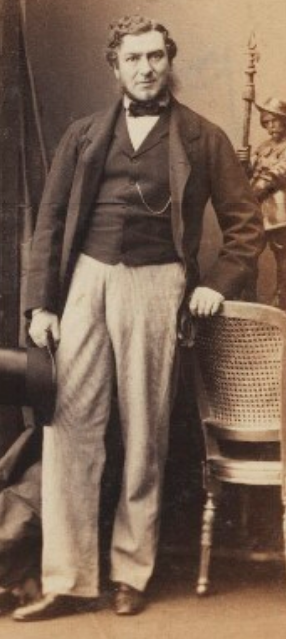
- Douglas Labalmondiere by Camille Silvy, 1861

Acting Commissioner of Police of the Metropolis
- In office 26 December 1868 – 1869
- Preceded by: Richard Mayne
- Succeeded by: Edmund Henderson

Assistant Commissioner of Police of the Metropolis (Administrative)
- In office 1856–1888

Inspecting Superintendent of the Metropolitan Police
- In office 1850–1856

Personal details
- Born: Douglas William Parish Labalmondière; 3 June 1815 Bath, Somerset, England
- Died: 8 March 1893 (aged 77)
- Occupation: British Army officer

Lieutenant-Colonel Douglas William Parish Labalmondière CB (3 June 1815 – 8 March 1893) was the first Assistant Commissioner (Administrative) of the London Metropolitan Police and acted as Commissioner for three months in 1868–1869.

Born at the family home at 18 Pulteney Street in Bath, Labalmondière was descended from an aristocratic French family who had established sugarcane plantations in the West Indies. He was educated at Eton College and the Royal Military College, Sandhurst, where he passed out at the head of the list with exceptional honours, and was commissioned an ensign into the 83rd (County of Dublin) Regiment of Foot (later the Royal Irish Rifles). He served in the Canadas, 1837–1838, carried dispatches during Mackenzie's Rebellion and Papineau's Rebellion, and was promoted lieutenant. He was promoted captain in 1844. In 1846–1849, he served in Ireland during the Great Famine, as temporary inspector with special duties under the Poor Law Commissioners. Following closure of the local relief committees in 1847, public testimonials of his endeavours were sent by committees in Castlegregory, Castleisland, Ventry, Tralee and Ballincuslane.

Following his order to rejoin his regiment in 1849 in India, he gave evidence to the Select Committee on Poor Laws (Ireland) on 20 March 1849 and on 23 March 1849. Whilst in India with his regiment, he was appointed to the Metropolitan Police and was permitted to return overland.

In 1850, he retired on half pay as a lieutenant-colonel and joined the Metropolitan Police as its second inspecting superintendent, effectively functioning as deputy to the two Joint Commissioners, Sir Richard Mayne and Captain William Hay (who had been his predecessor as inspecting superintendent). He was appointed Companion of the Order of the Bath (CB) for his services in policing the Great Exhibition in 1851 and in 1855 was selected to attend Queen Victoria in Paris.

In 1856, after Hay's death and the reorganisation of the police, Labalmondière was appointed Assistant Commissioner (Administrative). He was responsible for administration and discipline, with the Assistant Commissioner (Executive), Captain W. C. Harris, being responsible for supplies, buildings and other such business. Mayne was now the sole Commissioner. One of Labalmondière's duties was to make quarterly inspections of every police station and station house, with every tour of inspection taking nineteen days.

After Mayne's death on 26 December 1868, Labalmondière acted as Commissioner until the appointment of Colonel Edmund Henderson three months later. He continued to serve Henderson and his successor, Sir Charles Warren, as Assistant Commissioner until his retirement in 1888.

== Footnotes ==
Police appointments
Preceded by William Hay	Inspecting Superintendent, Metropolitan Police; 1850–1856	Succeeded by Last incumbent
Preceded by First incumbent	Assistant Commissioner (Administrative), Metropolitan Police; 1856–1888	Succeeded by Alexander Carmichael Bruce
Preceded by Sir Richard Mayne	Commissioner of Police of the Metropolis (Acting); 1868–1869	Succeeded by Edmund Henderson
