= West End Riots =

1886 riots in London

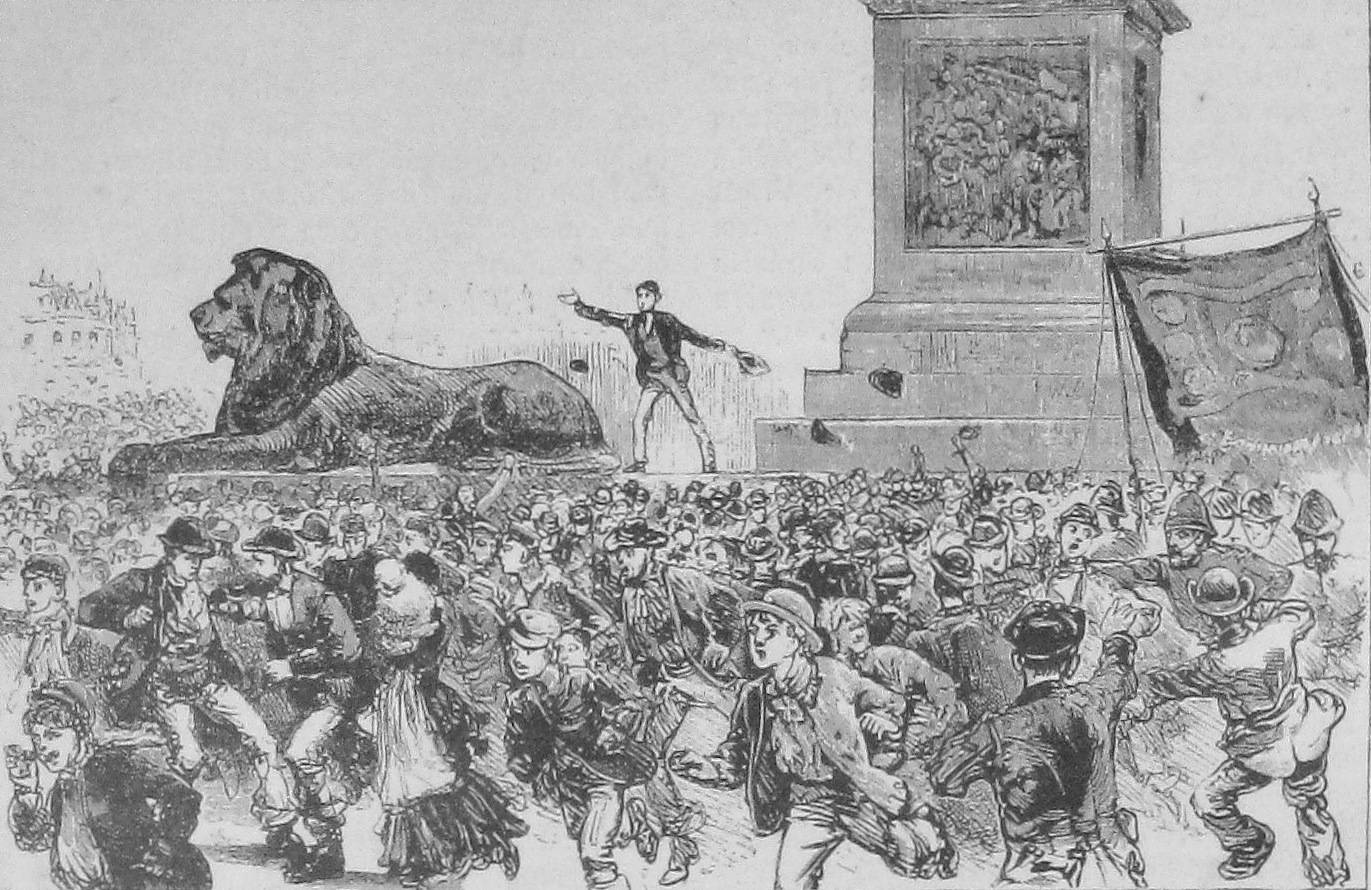
End of the meeting in Trafalgar Square (illustration from the Illustrated London News).

The West End Riots were disorders in the West End of London on 8 February 1886 following a counter-demonstration by the Social Democratic Federation in Trafalgar Square against a meeting of the Fair Trade League. They were also known as the Trafalgar Square Riots or Pall Mall Riots.

Windows were smashed at the Carlton Club and the offices of the Pall Mall Gazette soon after the counter-demonstration broke up, with its participants (estimated in some newspapers around 100,000) then marching along Piccadilly, Regent Street and Oxford Street, also damaging the Devonshire Club and several shops before forming up for a further meeting in Hyde Park. It also made an attempt on the War Office, but were dissuaded by its sentry charging his bayonet.

Feelings were further enflamed when Metropolitan Police officers pushed through the crowd to remove John Burns from the pedestal of Nelson's Column, from which he was trying to make a speech. Questions were asked in the House of Lords on 18 and 25 February as to the police's handling of the events and on the afternoon of 22 February the Home Secretary Hugh Childers accepted the resignation of Edmund Henderson, Commissioner of the Metropolitan Police.
