= Samuel Edward Moore =

Australian politician

- Born: Samuel Edward Moore; 1 October 1803; Derry, Ireland
- Died: 4 July 1849 (aged 45); Perth, Western Australia

Samuel Edward Moore (born 1803) was an early settler in colonial Western Australia, a merchant, pastoralist and a politician.

Samuel Edward Moore was born in 1803 in Derry, Ireland, the son of Joseph Moore and his wife Anne, née Fletcher. He had been involved in glass manufacturing in Ireland from 1823, which failed due to heavy duties on Irish glass. He was made a freeman of the city of Derry in 1827. Moore began trading there in farm produce.

His older brother, George Fletcher Moore, a lawyer, had arrived at the Swan River Colony in October 1829, and was granted land on the Avon and the Swan Rivers. Moore married Dora Mary Jane "Dorothy" Dalgety in 1832. Samuel and his wife came to the Swan River Colony following his brother's favourable reports of prospects there. They arrived on the Quebec Trader in April 1834. For a number of months, they stayed with his brother on his land grant on the Swan. Moore gradually purchased land on the Swan, in the Leschenault district, and town lots in Perth and Fremantle. He was known as a "progressive agriculturalist" and "business man", owning stores and importing agencies in Fremantle, and had his own river barges to convey goods from Fremantle to Perth and Guildford, returning with produce from the Swan and the hinterland.

He was Chairman of the Western Australian Bank in its foundation year, 1841; Director of the Agricultural Society; a committee member of both the Western Australian Mining Company and a steamship company. In 1841, he leased Garden Island, and the Guildford Steam Mill in 1844.

Moore had six children: William Dalgety, born 30 Aug 1834; Mary Elizabeth, born in 1837; Frederick, born 13 March 1839; Annie Fletcher, born 20 March 1841; Samuel Joseph, born 1842, who died young (approximately 7 years old); and Samuel Joseph Fortescue born 3 April 1846.

In the 1840s, Moore took up a grant of 320 hectares (780 acres) in the northern part of the suburb, now known as Karrinyup. Moore's grant, Swan Location 92, was surveyed in 1844 by P. Chauncey, who recorded a large swamp just to the east of Karrinyup as Careniup Swamp.

In 1848, he was beset by bad debts, family illness, poor crops, and, in August, the Vixen, used to ship his produce, was wrecked.

In October 1848, Moore was appointed to one of four non-official nominee positions on the Legislative Council, a position he held until his death in July 1849.

Moore died on 4 July 1849 at the age of 45.
