= Judith Cutler =

British author

- Born: 1946 (age 79–80); Black Country
- Spouse: Keith Miles
- Writing career
- Language: English
- Genre: Crime novels
- Website: www.judithcutler.com

Judith Cutler is a writer of crime fiction whose novels are mostly in series: ten in the series about amateur sleuth and lecturer Sophie Rivers; six about Detective Sergeant Kate Power; six about antique restorer Lina Townend and five about Detective Superintendent Fran Harman. Most are set in the present day, in or around Birmingham.

== Biography ==
Born in 1946 in the Black Country, Cutler later moved to the Birmingham suburb of Harborne.

She started writing while at Oldbury Grammar School, winning the Critical Quarterly Short Story prize. She read English at university, but wrote nothing more until in her thirties. While suffering from chickenpox, she started her first, unpublished, novel. Two further unpublished works followed.

She taught English at a Further Education College in Birmingham, but quit after the publication of her first novel, and moved to the suburb of Kings Heath.

For many years she was a trustee of the City of Birmingham Symphony Orchestra's Benevolent Fund and on the Committee of Birmingham Chamber Music Society. Her husband is Keith Miles.

== Bibliography ==
=== Novels ===
==== Sophie Rivers ====
- Dying Fall (1995)
- Dying On Principle (1996)
- Dying To Write (1997)
- Dying For Millions (1997)
- Dying For Power (1998)
- Dying To Score (1999)
- Dying By Degrees (2000)
- Dying By The Book (2001)
- Dying in Discord (2002)
- Dying to Deceive 2003

==== Kate Power ====
- Power On Her Own (1998)
- Staying Power (1999)
- Power Games (2000)
- Will Power (2001)
- Hidden Power (2002)
- Power Shift (2003)

==== Lina Townend ====
- Drawing the Line (2004)
- Silver Guilt (2010)
- Ring Of Guilt (2010)
- Guilty Pleasures (2011)
- Guilt Trip (2012)
- Guilt Edged (2013)
- Guilty as Sin (2015)

==== Josie Welford ====
- The Food Detective (2005)
- Chinese Takeout (2006)

==== Fran Harman ====
- Life Sentence (2005)
- Cold Pursuit (2007)
- Still Waters (2009)
- Burying the Past (2012)
- Double Fault (2013)

==== Tobias Campion ====
- Keeper of Secrets (2007)
- Shadow of the Past (2008)

==== Jodie Welsh ====
- Death in Elysium (2014)

==== Non-series romances ====
- Coming Alive (2000)
- Head Over Heels (2001)

==== Non-series mysteries ====
- Scar Tissue (2005) - protagonist Caffy Tyler
- Staging Death (2009) - protagonist Vena Burford

=== Short stories ===
- The Faintest of Tickles - a new anthology of cricket writing with a Foreword by Daniel Norcross; Bolzwinick Books, 2025, 262pp; ISBN 979-8334014152

Cutler has also written several successful short stories, for Radio 4, Bella magazine and others.
