= George Hampton (public servant) =

Public official in colonial Western Australia

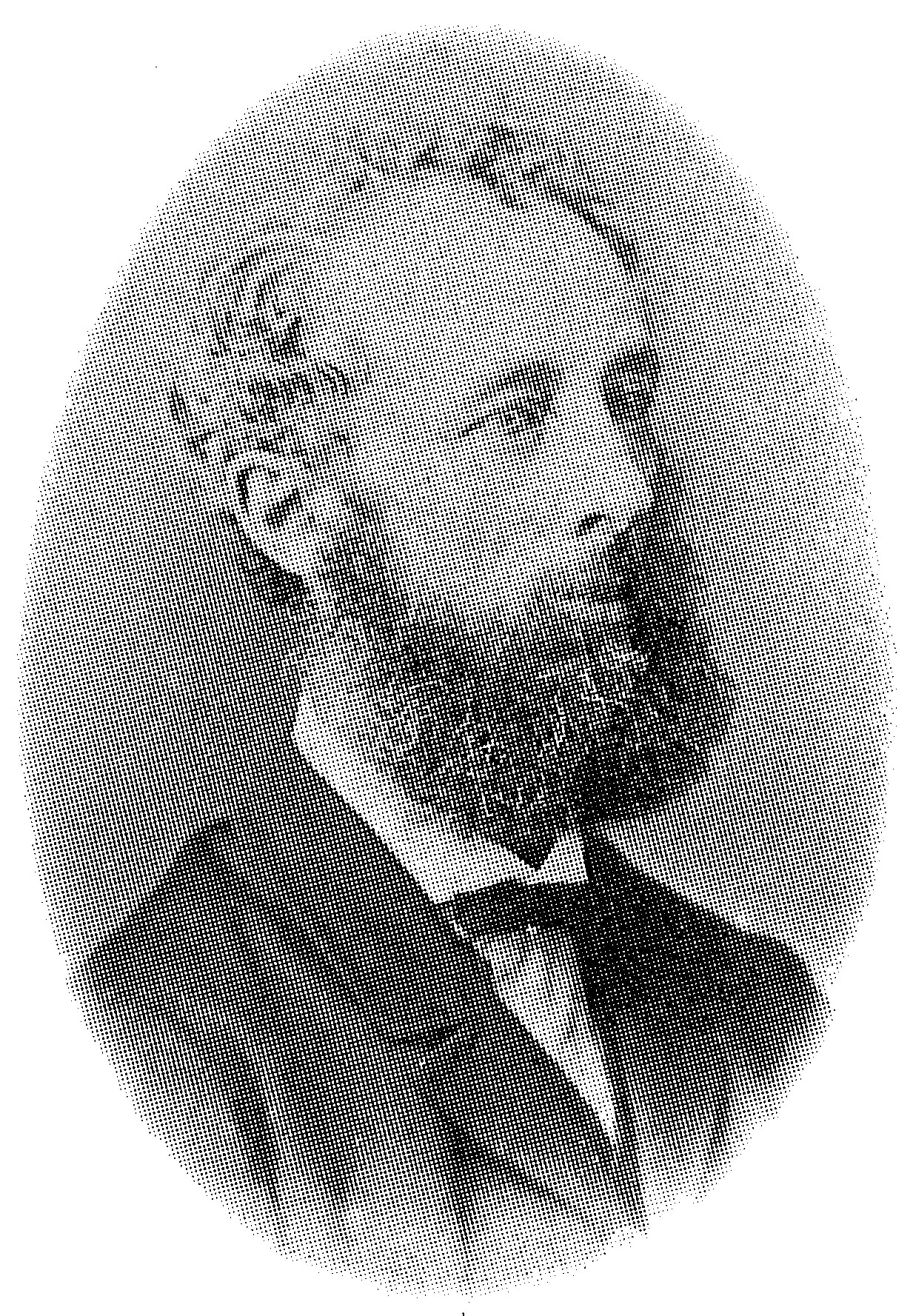
George Essex Hampton

George Essex Hampton (c. 1838 – 1876) was an unpopular public official in colonial Western Australia.

The son of Governor of Western Australia John Hampton, George Hampton arrived in the colony with his father in February 1862 on board Stathallen. In 1866 he was holding the offices of private secretary to his father, clerk of council and member of the Finance Board, when he was in addition appointed acting Comptroller General of Convicts. As Hampton had no particular qualifications for the position, this "unusually blatant act of nepotism" was extremely unpopular within the colony. It was further rumoured that George Hampton received a lodging allowance for the position, an allowance to which he was entitled by regulations but did not need since he lived with his father at Government House. The Perth Gazette sarcastically commented that Hampton could not apply the money to the purpose for which it was granted,

unless, [...] his Excellency intends to charge him rent for the rooms he occupies in his residence, in which case, of course, the amount will be placed to the credit of the colonial revenue [...].

Both Hamptons became figures of public hostility and ridicule thereafter, especially George.

Under George Hampton, convict discipline became extremely harsh; floggings became commonplace and solitary confinement was reintroduced. He was hated by most convicts, and in October 1866 a convict named Connor attacked him with a pickaxe at the Fremantle Quarries, and only the swift action of a guard saved him. As a result of Hampton's harsh convict discipline, escape attempts increased markedly. When Moondyne Joe effected his famous escape of 7 March 1867, the public in general felt that a good joke had been played on the Governor and his son, and much pleasure was taken in ridiculing them. A song caught on:

The Governor's son has got the pip,
The Governor's got the measles.
For Moondyne Joe has give 'em the slip,
Pop goes the weasel.

Governor Hampton lobbied for his son to be confirmed in his acting position, but was unsuccessful. At the conclusion of Governor Hampton's term, George Hampton indicated his willingness to remain in the colony provided he was official appointed Comptroller General. A week later the appointment of Henry Wakefield was announced, and in November 1868 George Hampton accompanied his father in departing the colony on Emily Smith.

Little is known of Hampton's personal life. In 1865, Bishop Hale had been openly critical of his "romantic affair with a Mrs Young". On 13 June 1868, he married Fanny Stone, and she accompanied him back to England. He died in 1876.

== Sources ==
- Battye, James Sykes (March 2005) [1924]. Asscher, Sue (ed.). Western Australia: A History from its Discovery to the Inauguration of the Commonwealth. Project Gutenberg of Australia. Wikidata Q126159134.
- Boyce, P. J. (1979). "J. S. Hampton, the governor". In Hunt, Lyall (ed.). Westralian Portraits. Nedlands, Western Australia: University of Western Australia Press. ISBN 0-85564-157-6.
- De Garis, Brian (1981). Stannage, Charles Thomas (ed.). A New History of Western Australia. Nedlands: UWA Publishing. ISBN 0-85564-181-9. LCCN 82101009. OCLC 963830667. OL 3517729M. Wikidata Q125995168.
