= Scindian =

History

United Kingdom
- Name: Scindian
- Namesake: Scindia
- Launched: 1844
- Fate: Sank 3 November 1880

General characteristics
- Type: Convict ship
- Tonnage: 605nrt, 637grt, & 536(Under deck)
- Tons burthen: 535,(Old calculation) or 650(post-1836 Act) (bm)
- Length: 129 ft 1 in (39.3 m)
- Beam: 31 ft 7 in (9.6 m)
- Depth: 21 ft 2 in (6.5 m)
- Sail plan: Barque

Scindian is widely considered the first convict ship to transport convicts to Western Australia. She was launched in 1844 and sank in 1880.

== Career ==
Scindian was constructed at Sunderland, England, in 1844 and named after the Indian Scindia dynasty. She appeared in Lloyd's Register (LR) in 1844 with J.Terry, master, J. Allan, owner, and trade London-India. Lloyd's Register for 1850 showed her master as J. Cammell. Her owner was still Allan, but her trade was simply given as "London".

Scindian was driven ashore at the Cape of Good Hope, Cape Colony before 23 June 1849. She was refloated with the assistance of the steamship Phoenix.

Scindian left Portsmouth on 4 March 1850 under the command of Captain James Cammell and surgeon-superintendent John Gibson, and docked at Fremantle on 1 June 1850 after a voyage of 89 days. The vessel carried 275 people to Western Australia including 75 male convicts and 163 military pensioners. All the convicts survived the voyage. Among the passengers were a number of officials including Comptroller General of Convicts Edmund Henderson and Superintendent of Convicts Thomas Hill Dixon. Also on board was 10-year-old George Throssell, a son of a pensioner, who later became the second Premier of Western Australia.

The arrival of the convicts was a surprise to many of the Swan River Colony settlers, as Western Australia had petitioned for convicts but had not yet received a reply when Scindian arrived. As no preparations had been made for their arrival, the colony had no jail capable of housing so many convicts. This had been anticipated, and only convicts with a record of good behaviour had been sent. The convicts were initially housed in the warehouse premises of the harbourmaster, which is now the Esplanade Hotel. Shortly after the arrival, work began on the building of a Convict Establishment prison, now Fremantle Prison. After the pensioners arrived, the governor of the colony inducted 100 of them into an armed constabulary force; one of their first tasks was building the prison. The second convict transport to Western Australia was Hashemy, which arrived on 25 October.

Year	Master	Owner	Trade	Source & notes
1851	J.Cammell	J. Allan	London–Saint Helena	LR
1855		J. Allan	London	LR
1860				Not listed in LR
1865				Not listed in LR
1870				Not listed in LR
1875		J.H. Allan	London	LR
1880		Wilson & Co.	London	LR; annotation "Wrecked"

== Fate ==
Scindian sank off the cost of Rio Marina, Elba, Italy on 3 November 1880. Captain Lawrenson and five other men drowned; eight crewmen were rescued.

== List of Scindian passengers ==
Scindian is widely considered the first convict ship to arrive in Western Australia, because she was the first to arrive after Western Australia became a penal colony. A number of ships did bring Parkhurst apprentices to Western Australia between 1842 and 1849, and while these were not considered convict ships by the Western Australian authorities, they were classified as such in English records.

Passengers on Scindian included Thomas Hill Dixon, Edmund Henderson and George Throssell. A full list is provided below.

=== Convicts ===
Convicts
Name	Convict number	Age when sentenced	Crime	Trial place	Trial date	Sentence
William Bailey	75	21	House breaking	Central Criminal Court	1848	14 years
James Baker	48	48	Stealing fowls	Exeter	1847	14 years
George Barker	39	23	Pick pocket	Yorkshire Assizes	6 March 1847	15 years
James Baxter	32	25	Violence & striking superior officer (Army)	Corfu	1847	14 years
Francis Best	73	32	House breaking	Worcester	1847	15 years
John Bradbury	66	24	Rape	Chester	1848	20 years
Samuel Brakes	26	35	Burglary	Peterborough	1848	15 years
William Branson	3	33	Sheep stealing	Leicester	1848	15 years
Arthur Bristow	51	31	Grievous bodily harm	Kingston upon Thames	1848	15 years
Reginald Bristow	50	27	Grievous bodily harm	Kingston upon Thames	1848	15 years
Joseph Brown	45	41	Stealing oats & drapery	Boston Sessions	June 1847	14 years
Charles Burgess	38	34	House breaking	Maidstone	1846	14 years
Solomon Burkett	19	46	Burglary	Peterborough	1848	15 years
William Carter	8	25	Horse stealing	Worcester	1847	15 years
James Cox	53	38	Stealing a watch	Dorset	1847	15 years
John Davies	52	32	Rape	Swansea	1848	15 years
Robert Dawes	35	28	Sheep stealing	Swaffham	1847	14 years
Samuel Diggle	58	39	Burglary	Liverpool	20 March 1847	15 years
John Dobson	36	31	Pick pocket	Stafford	1847	14 years
William Drake	42	25	House breaking & stealing money	Newport	1847	15 years
Robert Eley	14	23	Stealing a copper funnel	Durham	1848	14 years
Thomas Faulds	22	23	Robbery with violence	Glasgow	1847	14 years
Thomas Fletcher	18	24	Robbery with violence	Lancaster	1848	15 years
Thomas Hargreaves	31	30	Stealing crockery	Portsmouth	1847	14 years
Thomas Hart	55	23	Burglary	Cambridge	17 March 1848	15 years
James Hatton	69	29	Rape	Liverpool	1847	20 years
Thomas Hirst	10	26	House breaking	York	1847	15 years
Robert Holder	40	26	Robbery	Portsmouth	1847	15 years
Samuel Jackson	16	36	Robbery with violence	Chester	0	15 years
Luke Jeffry	56	26	Stealing money	Cambridge	1848	15 years
John Jermyn	6	24	Rape	Norwich	1848	15 years
William Johnson	70	30	Firing stacks	Stafford	1847	20 years
Richard Jones	41	38	Warehouse breaking	Reading	1847	15 years
Allan Lancaster	57	35	Breaking out of gaol & stealing	Knutsford	1848	14 years
John Larcombe	4	30	House breaking	Dorchester	1848	15 years
William Loveridge	34	29	Arson	Aylesbury	1848	15 years
Alexander Matthieson	44	28	House breaking	Glasgow	1847	21 years
James Morris	49	43	Counterfeiting coin	Central Criminal Court	1847	15 years
John Morris	67	24	Rape	Winchester	1848	15 years
George Oliver	65	28	Robbery with violence	Chester	1848	15 years
James Osborne	62	23	House breaking	Worcester	1848	15 years
John Osborne	72	30	Horse stealing	Sleaford	6 January 1848	15 years
John Patience	2	30	Burglary	Dorset	1848	14 years
George Phillips	30	33	Absent & violence to superior officer (Army)	Bury	1847	14 years
Matthew Porteous	20	53	Theft	Edinburgh	28 February 1848	14 years
George Postins	17	17	House breaking	Worcester	0	20 years
Charles Pye	59	28	Burglary	Chelmsford	1847	15 years
James Rackham	43	48	Receiving stolen goods	Chelmsford	1848	14 years
Thomas Rutledge Raine	63	24	Pick pocket	York	6 March 1847	15 years
John Raison	64	24	Assault & robbery	Lincoln	6 March 1847	15 years
John Rampling	46	27	Striking superior officers (Army)	Newcastle	1847	14 years
George Richardson	71	39	Attempting to strike superior officer (Army)	BARBADOS	1848	14 years
Thomas Robinson	68	24	Burglary	Maidstone	1847	14 years
Thomas Rodrigues	24	27	Manslaughter	Liverpool	1847	15 years
Samuel Scattergood	1	36	Sheep stealing	Leicester	9 March 1848	15 years
James Smith	9	26	House breaking	Worcester	1848	15 years
John Smith	33	19	Arson	Chelmsford	1848	15 years
Samuel Smith	37	28	House breaking	Warwick	1848	15 years
William Smith	13	25	House breaking	Worcester	1848	15 years
Edward Spillett	12	32	Manslaughter	Maidstone	1848	15 years
Martin Stone	25	24	Horse stealing	Dorchester	1847	15 years
Thomas Stubbs	21	20	House breaking	Chester	29 March 1848	14 years
James Sweeney	15	58	Uttering counterfeit coin	Caernarvon	1847	15 years
Seymour Taylor	28	35	Stealing an oak beam	Ipswich	1847	15 years
James Tetlow	23	56	Manslaughter	Liverpool	1848	15 years
Alexander Thomas	61	22	Manslaughter	Swansea	1848	15 years
George Thompson	7	26	Manslaughter	Newcastle	1848	15 years
Thomas Trott	11	28	Stealing & assault	Lincoln Assizes	1847	15 years
Frederick Ward	29	30	Stealing	Birmingham	1847	15 years
George Watkins	27	32	Stealing clothes	Durham	1848	14 years
Thomas Welsby	5	26	Robbery	Liverpool	1848	15 years
Francis Westmoreland	47	46	Sheep stealing	Stafford	1847	15 years
Esau Wetherall	54	35	Horse stealing	Taunton	1847	15 years
George Wilson	74	23	Arson	Chelmsford	1848	15 years
John Wilson	60	41	Robbery with violence	Newcastle	1848	15 years

=== Pensioner guards ===
Pensioner guards
Name	Age	Notes
Samuel Annear		private, sapper and miner
		wife
Mary J. Annear	2	child, died on board
		three other children
John Atkinson		private, 2nd Queen's Dragoon Guards
Ann Atkinson		wife
		two children
George Bagg	32	private, Royal Marines
Catharine Bagg	31	wife
Sarah Bagg	3	child
Robert Baker		private, 34th Regiment
		wife and three children
John Barrett	46	private, 61st Regiment
Alice Barrett		wife
Catharine Barrett	2	child
Mary A. Barrett	9 months	child
James Bond		private, 17th Regiment
Henry Burton	44	corporal, 54th Regiment
Harriet Burton	43	wife
Samuel Butterworth		acting corporal, Royal Artillery
Catherine Butterworth		wife
		three children
James Caldwell		corporal, 57th Regiment
		wife
Charles Clark		private, 40th Regiment
George Clark		private, 9th Regiment
		one child
John Coyle		sergeant, 27th Regiment
		wife and one child
Henry Davey	35	private, Royal Marines
Jane Davey	24	wife
	infant	child
John Day		private, 31st Regiment
		wife and child
John Dulston		private, 80th Regiment
		wife
Samuel Fairbrother		private, 29th Regiment
William Finlay	40	private, 97th Regiment
Marjory Finlay		wife
		three children, including William Finlay jr
Joseph Foot	47	private, 76th Regiment
Catherine Foot	42	wife
		four children
Scindian Gibson Foot		child, born at sea
Patrick Gallagher		private, 7th Battalion Royal Artillery
		wife
Andrew Gordon		corporal, 40th Regiment
Mary Ann Gordon		wife
Thomas Hammond		private, 80th Regiment
John Harris	38	private, 97th Regiment
Charlotte Harris		wife
William Harris		child
Henry Herbert	50	private, Royal African Corp
Ann Herbert		wife
Henry Herbert		child
Joseph Herbert		child
		one other child (Agnes Herbert Daughter)
John Hubble	33	private, 32nd Regiment
Jane Hubble	20	wife
William Hubble	37	private, 32nd Regiment
James Hunt	46	private, Royal Marines
		wife and child
James Jones		private, 38th Regiment, sapper and miner
John Kingdon	41	private, 43rd Regiment
		wife and five children
John Kirwan	42	sergeant, 30th Regiment
Jane Kirwan		wife
		five children
Robert Lindsay	45	private, 2nd Queen's Regiment
Julia Lindsay		wife
Julia Lindsay	2	child
Thomas McMullen	42	private, 4th Battalion Royal Artillery
Ann McMullen		wife
		two children
Henry Morgan		private, 10th Battalion Royal Artillery
		wife and three children
James Murphy		private, 19th Regiment
Ann Murphy		wife
		four children
Peter Murphy		private, 31st Regiment
		wife and three children
Joseph Nichols	52	drummer
		wife
John Nicholson		private, 1st Regiment
William Oak	35	private, 46th Regiment
Daniel O'Connell		private, 6th Regiment
		wife
Sarah O'Connell	2	child
		one other child
John O'Connor		private, British East India Company
Sarah O'Connor		wife
		two children
Moses O'Keefe	48	private, 44th Regiment
Norah O'Keefe		wife
Dennis O'Keefe		child
John Payne	48	private, 40th Regiment
Michael Reddin		sergeant, 61st Regiment
Jane Reddin		wife
		four children
Richard Roffey		private, 59th Regiment
James Rourke		private, 27th Regiment
Anna Rourke		wife
James Rourke	1	child
		four other children
John Skillen		private, 2nd Regiment
		wife and child
James Stark	32	private, 9th Regiment
James Stevens	49	private, British East India Company
Johanna Stevens		wife
Michael Stokes	50	private, British East India Company (Artillery)
		wife and child
Samuel Sutton	39	private, Royal Marines
Ann Sutton		wife
Frances Sutton	2	child
		one other child
James Taylor		private, 2nd Regiment
(George) Michael Throssell	42	private, 7th Dragoon Guards
Jane Ann Throssell		wife
Thomas Throssell	14	child
George Lionel Throssell	10	child
		one other child
Peter Towers	39	private, Royal Marines
		wife
Emanuel Unwin		sapper, Royal Engineers
John Watkins	33	private, 94th Regiment
Elizabeth Watkins		wife
		two children
William Watts		sergeant, 21st Regiment
		wife and child
John Winfield	44	private, Grenadier Guards
		wife and child

=== Other passengers ===
Other passengers
Name	Age	Notes
John Carr		warder
		wife
Thomas Hill Dixon		Superintendent of Convicts
		common law wife and two children
		servant
John Gibson		surgeon superintendent
Edmund Henderson		Comptroller General of Convicts
		wife and child
		two servants
James Manning	36	Clerk of Works
Jane Manning		wife
James Manning		child
		one other child
		servant employed by James MANNING
		corporal, Royal Engineers
		private, sapper, Royal Engineers
		private, sapper, Royal Engineers
		private, sapper, Royal Engineers
