= Edward Mayne =

Court Judge of Common Pleas of Ireland

The Hon. Edward Mayne (August 1756 – 7 May 1829) was a Judge of the Court of Common Pleas of Ireland (1805–1816) and afterwards Judge of The Court of the King's Bench (1816–1818).

== Birth ==
Edward Mayne was baptised on 30 August 1756. He was the eldest son of Charles Mayne (1727–1777) of Freame Mount, County Cavan and his wife (and cousin) Dorothea Mayne, daughter of Edward Mayne of Brandrum House, County Fermanagh. His father, son of Robert Mayne (1679–1753) of Mount Sedborough, County Monaghan (which was granted to his ancestor, John Sedborough (d.1629), in 1614), built Freame Mount in 1772. The house looked over the Dartrey estate, owned by Edward's father's cousin and benefactor, Thomas Dawson, 1st Viscount Cremorne (1725–1813). It was named for Lord Cremorne's new wife, Philadelphia Hannah Freame, granddaughter of William Penn of the Province of Pennsylvania.

== Legal career ==
Mayne entered Trinity College Dublin in 1772. He was elected a scholar of the college in 1775 and graduated B.A. in 1777. His father died in the same year that he graduated, and as the eldest son, he inherited Freame Mount. Rather than abandon his plans for a career in law, Mayne passed the responsibility of running the estate to his younger brother, William, providing him with legal advice when needed. William Mayne went on to serve as a Justice of the Peace and High Sheriff of County Monaghan.

In 1779, Edward Mayne went to London, entering Middle Temple, and was called to the Irish Bar in 1781. After a lengthy and successful career as a barrister in Dublin, in 1805 he was appointed a Judge of Court of Common Pleas (Ireland). In 1816, he was appointed Judge of the Court of King's Bench (Ireland) at Four Courts but he resigned two years later due to ill health.

He was, according to John Edward Walsh, "a serious, solemn man and a rigid moralist", and was strongly opposed to duelling. Daniel O'Connell, who had a low opinion of most of the Irish judges he appeared before, had particular contempt for Mayne, remarking that he found it impossible not to laugh at a judge who was so easily persuaded to rule in his favour. One description of him referred to him as being of the "sapient, soft and melancholy strain", but records show he had a reputation for severity. A list of the sentences he passed in 1815 (kept at the Old Court House, Downpatrick Museum) includes a number of death sentences—one for stealing a horse. An anecdote survives of someone inquiring about his Christian name, which was met with the reply, "I cannot tell what it is, but I know what it is not, it is not Hugh".

== Family ==
In 1780, he married Sarah Fiddes (1765–1853), daughter of John Fiddes, Attorney of Dublin, by his wife Catherine Walsh of Lislea, County Monaghan. They were the parents of thirteen children, twelve of whom reached adulthood. The best known of their children was Sir Richard Mayne, the first joint Commissioner of Police of the Metropolis. Their son Edward Mayne was serjeant-at-arms of the New Zealand House of Representatives from 1858 to 1865. Edward and Sarah Mayne were the grandparents of Richard Mayne and John Dawson Mayne.
