= Comptroller General of Convicts (Western Australia) =

Head of convict establishment in Western Africa

The Comptroller General of Convicts was the head of the convict establishment in Western Australia.

The office existed from 1850, when Western Australia first became a penal colony, until 1872, four years after penal transportation to Western Australia had ceased.

== History ==
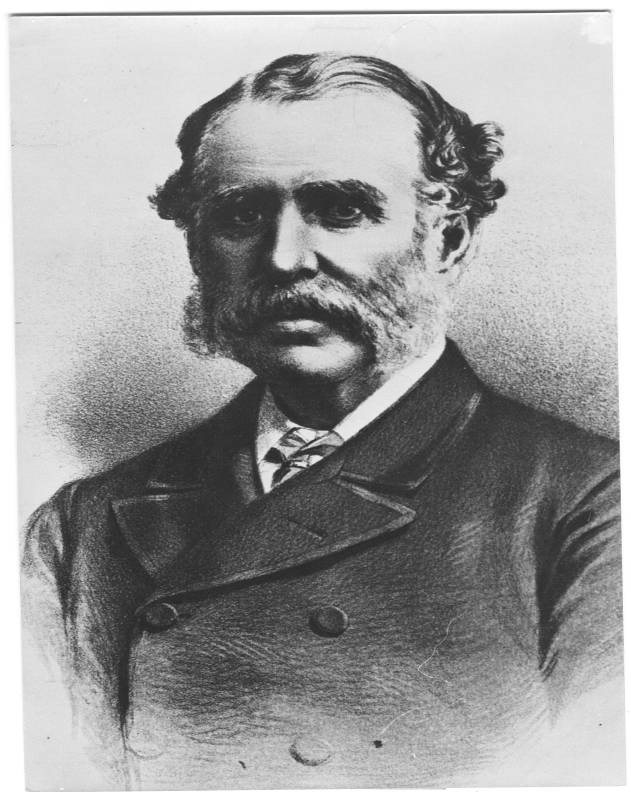
Edmund Henderson

Western Australia's first Comptroller General of Convicts, Edmund Henderson, arrived in the colony with the first convicts on board the Scindian in June 1850. He was described as "a kindly and just man, moderate and understanding, opposed to the harsher forms of discipline." Respected by both colonists and convicts, Henderson administered Western Australia's convict establishment for thirteen years; Battye writes that "its success was no doubt due to his wisdom and tact."

After Henderson's resignation in 1863, William Newland was appointed his successor. Newland's arrival closely followed the arrival of Governor John Hampton. Hampton had previously been Comptroller General of Convicts in Van Diemen's Land, and assumed far more direct control of Western Australia's convict establishment than had his predecessors. Newland and Hampton constantly disagreed with each other, and Hampton complained to the Secretary of State for the Colonies that Newland was incompetent. Newland was eventually removed in 1866.

While awaiting a successor to the position, Governor Hampton appointed his son, George Hampton, to act in the position. George Hampton had no particular qualifications for the position, and already held a number of salaried posts. This "unusually blatant act of nepotism" was extremely unpopular within the colony, both Hamptons thereafter being figures of public hostility and ridicule. Governor Hampton lobbied for his son to be confirmed in the position, but was unsuccessful.

Under George Hampton, convict discipline became extremely strict. Solitary confinement was re-introduced, and convicts were flogged for serious offences. Escape attempts increased markedly, and there were even attempts by convicts to kill George Hampton.

Henry Wakeford was appointed Comptroller General of Convicts in 1867, and the following year Governor Hampton's term ended. Wakeford reduced the size of the chain gangs and the number of floggings, and the system returned to what it had been under Henderson.

Transportation to Western Australia ceased in 1868. In the following years, the number of convicts slowly diminished, and the convict establishment was gradually wound up. In 1872 the office of Comptroller General of Convicts was abolished, and Wakeford was transferred to the Colonial Office. A temporary position of Acting Comptroller General was then created.

== List of comptrollers general of convicts in WA ==
| Comptroller General | Period in office |
|---|---|
| Edmund Henderson | June 1850 – January 1863 |
| William Newland | January 1863 – February 1866 |
| George Hampton | February 1866 – May 1867 (acting) |
| Henry Wakeford | May 1867 – September 1872 |

== See also ==
- Convict era of Western Australia
- Fremantle Prison
- History of Western Australia
- Swan River Colony

== Sources ==
- Battye, James Sykes (1924). Western Australia: A History from its Discovery to the Inauguration of the Commonwealth. Oxford: Oxford University Press. ASIN B00086VAOQ. LCCN 25004763. OCLC 4362013. OL 50547304M. Wikidata Q133867108.
- de Garis, B. K. (1981). "Political tutelage 1829–1890". In Stannage, Charles Thomas (ed.). A New History of Western Australia. Nedlands: UWA Publishing. ISBN 0-85564-181-9. LCCN 82101009. OCLC 963830667. OL 3517729M. Wikidata Q125995168.
- Hasluck, Alexandra (1991) [1959]. Unwilling Emigrants. Melbourne: Fremantle Arts Centre Press. ISBN 0-949206-94-6.
