= Devil's Acre =

1800s slum area of central London

Coordinates: 51.4972°N 0.1323°W

The Devil's Acre as depicted in Gustave Dore's London: a Pilgrimage

The Devil's Acre was a notorious slum or rookery in Westminster, London, England that existed until the late 1800s. It was centred around Old Pye Street. By 1850, it formed a roughly square block bounded by Dean, Peter and Tothill Street as well as Strutton Ground. "Devil's Acre" was one of many general terms for informal settlements in London before slum became widely adopted, largely popularised by its use to describe the Devil's Acre.

== Description ==
Like most Victorian slums, the Devil's Acre had a high population density with multiple families crowded into single households. The area was noted as being exceptional for crime such as prostitution and vagrancy even when compared to other slums. Its location near the seat of government as well as Westminster Abbey, whose towers were said to be visible from any point within it, made the area a spectacle for observers – a display of destitution in contrast with nearby wealth. The location likely contributed to its state, being undesirable due to lying on an originally swampy area within the floodplain of the River Tyburn. This also made waste management an issue inevitably leading to its reputation as being an area of dirt and disease.

== Responses ==
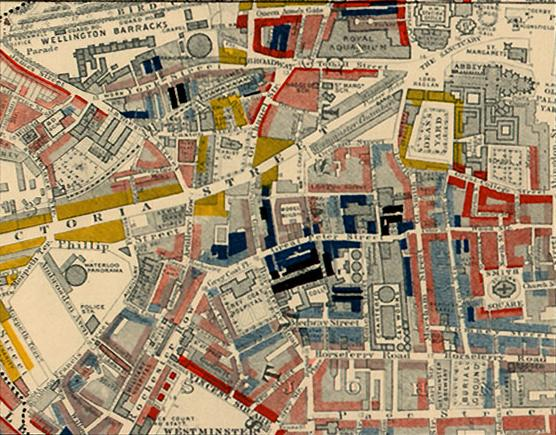
Charles Booth's Poverty Map showing the environs of the Devil's Acre in 1889. Black designated the "lowest class occasional labourers, street sellers, loafers, criminals and semi-criminals"

=== Slum Clearances ===
The area faced slum clearances in the decades following the 1845 Westminster Improvement Act. The Peabody Estate would slowly and eventually entirely replace the informal housing that was present, with the Abbey Orchard Estate in its site remaining extant and in the trust's hand today. Victoria Street's route was said to intentionally pierce through the centre of the slums.

=== Charles Booth's Poverty Map ===
Many of the streets of Devil's Acre in Charles Booth's Poverty Map of 1889 are designated with the lowest class or poorest residents. Households were noted as holding "prostitutes, thieves, general dealers, hawkers". Two of the houses were described "black and grimy; open doors dirty children and bad-faced women; all the normal signs of physical neglect and moral degradation". Where children lived above the poverty line, the households were still marked down as "orig. notorious for every kind of vice, had common lodging houses". The more recently and intentionally developed Victoria Street was coloured yellow, showing it as housing more affluent residents. By 1902 it was noted that on Old Pye Street "a few squalid houses with low doorways remain".
