= Richard West Nash =

Australian politician

Richard West Nash (1808 – 22 December 1850 in London) was a lawyer, politician and newspaper owner in the early days of the British colony of Western Australia.

== History ==
Nash was born in Dublin, son of Richard Nash, rector of Ardstraw in the diocese of Londonderry. He studied law at Trinity College, Dublin, graduating MA in 1932, and was admitted to the Irish Bar. He emigrated to Western Australia in 1839, having on 12 July 1834 married Elizabeth Schoales, whose brother John Schoales jun. had settled there in 1838. He practised law in Perth, but was also involved in farming, and was secretary of the Vineyard Society, for whom he compiled A Manual for the Cultivation of the Vine and Olive in Western Australia, published in 1845.

He wrote, as "Viator", occasional pieces for the newspapers and was briefly (1845–1847) owner of The Inquirer. of which he was also editor, publisher and printer.

Nash was appointed acting Advocate General November 1846 – May 1847 in the first, non-representative, parliament. In 1848 he was appointed manager of the Colonization Assurance Corporation, an organization founded encourage English migration to Western Australia, for which he published Stray Suggestions on Colonization in 1849. He died at Norwood near London aged 42.

Nash Street, Perth, was named for him; as, most likely, was Nash Place, Stirling, Australian Capital Territory.
