= John Bruce (British Army officer) =

Irish-born British Army officer

John Bruce (25 July 1808 – 5 November 1870) was a British Army officer and acting Governor of Western Australia.

Bruce was born in Athlone, Ireland, of Scottish parents. Bruce was educated privately and at the Sandhurst Military College, England; he was appointed an ensign in the 16th on 31 July 1828 and joined it in Bengal. In the early 1840s he transferred to the 18th Regiment of Foot and served in China.

Bruce went to Western Australia with his regiment, and was for twenty years Staff-officer of Pensioners and Commandant of Western Australia. He was Acting Governor of the colony in February 1862, and from November 1868 to September 1869, during the interim between the departure of Governor John Hampton and the arrival of Governor Frederick Weld. Bruce died on 5 November 1870, at the age of sixty-two. Bruce had seven children, he was survived by his wife. Mount Bruce, Western Australia in the Hamersley Range is named for him.
