= Brian De Garis =

Western Australian historian

Brian De Garis is a Western Australian historian. He edited a number of important texts about Western Australian history. His Masters thesis was about Sir Hal Colebatch. His doctoral thesis entitled British influence on the federation of the Australian colonies, 1880-1901 was completed at Oxford University. He taught and was involved in administration at University of Western Australia, and Murdoch University.

== Publications ==
- De Garis, B. K. (1988), Fred Alexander : a tribute, University of Western Australia. Dept. of History, Dept. of History, University of Western Australia
- De Garis, B. K. (1988), Campus in the community : the University of Western Australia, 1963-1987, University of Western Australia Press, ISBN 978-0-85564-283-9
