= Charles Rowan =

British police commander

Lieutenant-Colonel Sir Charles Rowan KCB
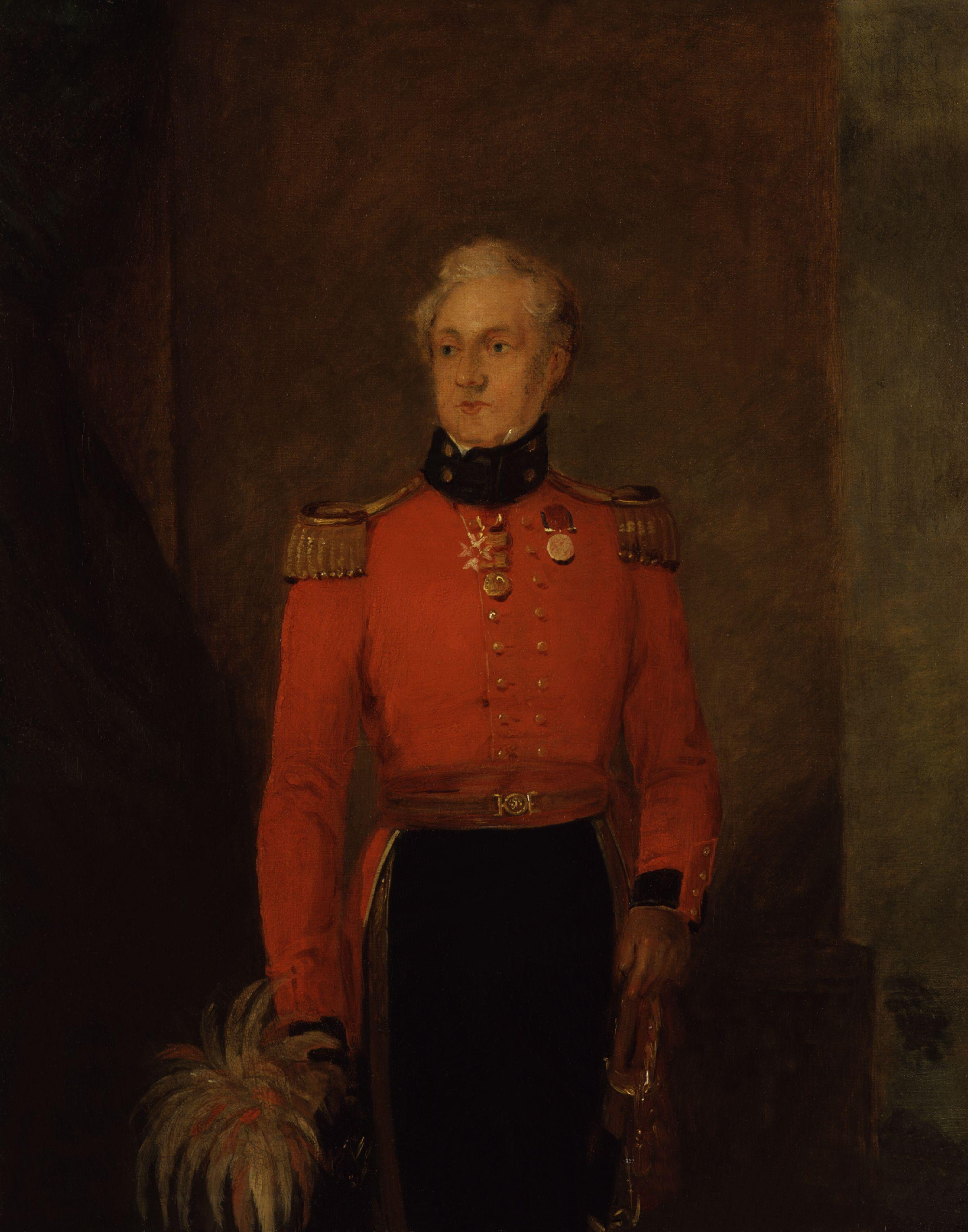
- Portrait by William Salter (National Portrait Gallery)

Commissioner of Police of the Metropolis
- In office 7 July 1829 – 1850 Serving with Richard Mayne
- Monarchs: George IV; William IV; Victoria
- Prime Minister: The Duke of Wellington; The Earl Grey; The Viscount Melbourne; Robert Peel; Lord John Russell
- Home Secretary: Robert Peel; The Viscount Melbourne; Baron Duncannon; The Duke of Wellington; Henry Goulburn; Lord John Russell; The Marquess of Normanby; Sir James Graham and others
- Preceded by: Office created
- Succeeded by: Richard Mayne and William Hay

Personal details
- Born: c. 1782 County Antrim
- Died: 8 May 1852 London, United Kingdom
- Resting place: Kensal Green Cemetery, London, United Kingdom

Lieutenant-Colonel Sir Charles Rowan KCB (c. 1782 – 8 May 1852) was an officer in the British Army, serving in the Peninsular War and Waterloo and the joint first Commissioner of Police of the Metropolis, head of the London Metropolitan Police.

== Family ==
Rowan was the fifth of the ten sons of Robert Rowan, an impoverished landowner of Scottish descent. His eldest brother was Lieutenant-Colonel John Rowan, whilst other brothers were Field Marshal Sir William Rowan (1789–1879), Britain's Commander-in-Chief, North America (1849), and Major James Rowan (born 1781), who was appointed Chief Police Magistrate for the Town and Territory of Gibraltar in 1830.

== Life ==
=== Early life ===
Born in County Antrim, Charles went to school in Carrickfergus. In 1797, he was commissioned an ensign in the 52nd Regiment of Foot, in which his elder brother Robert (1780–1863) was also a captain, as recorded on the latter's tomb monument at St Nicholas Church in Carrickfergus. He was promoted Paymaster in 1798, lieutenant in 1799, captain in 1803, brevet major in 1809, major in 1811, Brevet lieutenant-colonel in 1812, and finally lieutenant-colonel – all his promotions above captain were field promotions, not purchases.

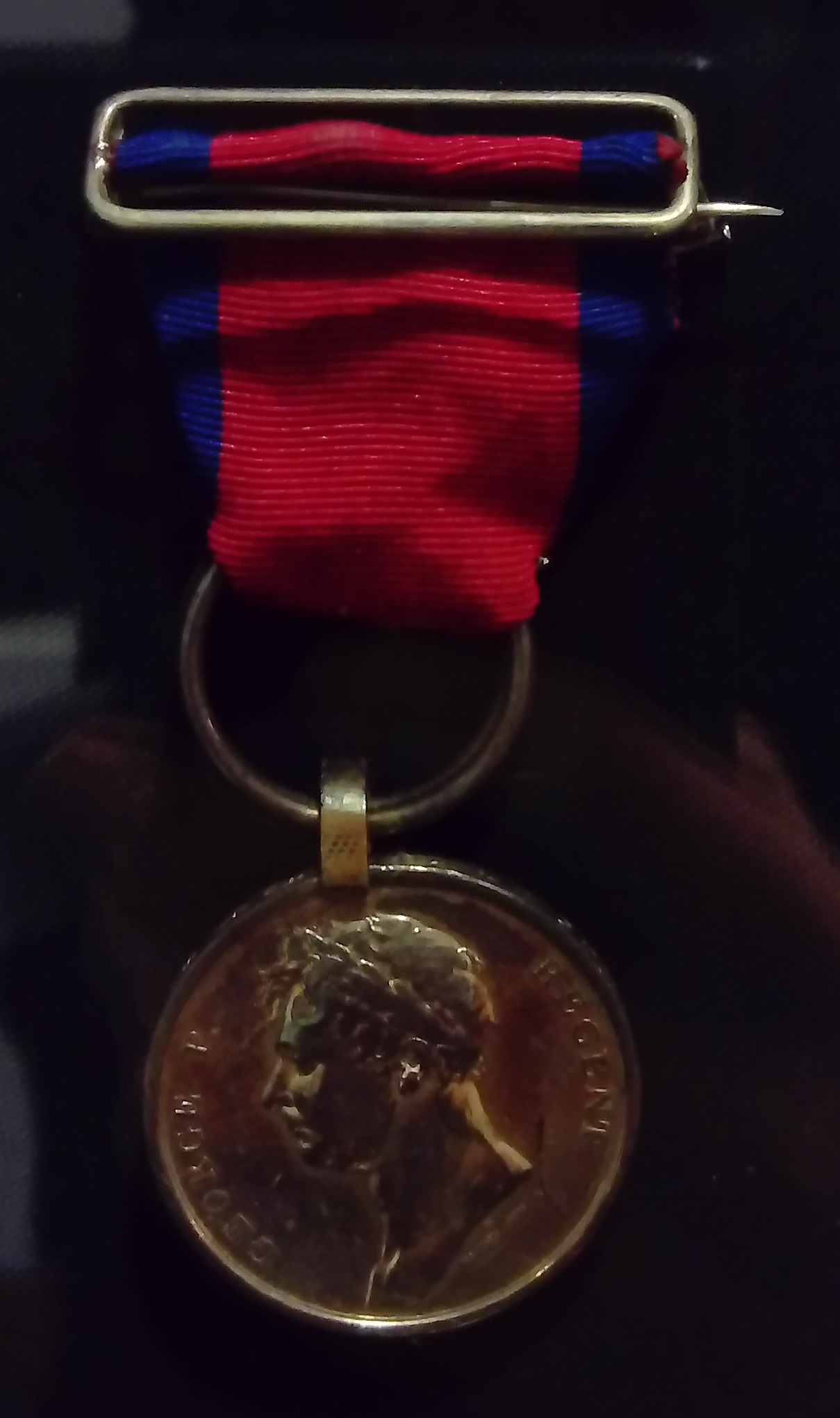
The Waterloo Medal awarded to Rowan on display at the Soldiers of Oxfordshire Museum in Woodstock.

Rowan saw active service during the Napoleonic Wars, in Sicily in 1806–1808, Sweden in 1808, and then in the Peninsular War, fighting at the Battles of Corunna, Ciudad Rodrigo, Badajoz, Buçaco, Fuentes d'Oñoro, the Côa and Salamanca, and serving as brigade major of the Light Brigade from 1809 and as assistant adjutant-general of the Light Division from 1811. As regimental second-in-command, he commanded a wing of the 52nd Foot at the Battle of Waterloo, where he was wounded, and was made a Companion of the Bath (CB) for his services. He returned to England with his regiment in 1818, and was stationed in the Midlands until 1821, when he took it to Dublin as commanding officer. He retired from the army by sale of his commission on 26 April 1822 and may then have served as a magistrate in his native Ireland.

=== 1829 ===
In June 1829, Rowan was selected by Home Secretary Sir Robert Peel as founding senior Commissioner of the Metropolitan Police after the first man offered the post, Lieutenant-Colonel James Shaw Kennedy, had turned it down. Peel was probably acting on advice from the Duke of Wellington and Sir George Murray, Wellington's Quartermaster-General in the Peninsula and now Secretary of State for War and the Colonies in his government, who had been impressed by Rowan's conduct at Waterloo. Rowan was to provide the military discipline and organisation that it was felt the new police force needed and the junior Commissioner, barrister Richard Mayne, was to provide the legal expertise. Over the next twenty years, the two men were to become firm friends, and their close co-operation was to provide a solid foundation for the new police force.

Rowan and Mayne took up their new posts on 7 July 1829. Later that month, they moved their offices into 4 Whitehall Place, and Rowan also took up residence in an apartment at the top of the building. On 29 August, they were sworn in as justices of the peace by Lord Chief Baron Sir William Alexander.

The two Commissioners were almost entirely responsible for the organisation of the new force. In twelve weeks, they managed to recruit, train, organise, equip and deploy a force of nearly one thousand men. They drew up regulations and pay scales, designed and ordered uniforms and equipment, and found, purchased and furnished station houses. Rowan's military experience led to the division of London into six divisions, each divided into eight sections, each of which was divided into eight beats. The beat system, with each constable almost overlapping the next, was based on the Shorncliffe System for light infantry, devised by Sir John Moore, Rowan's commander in the Peninsula (and who had paid for his captaincy in 1803). It is possible that it was Rowan's idea to outfit the police in more civilian-styled blue uniforms rather than the scarlet and gold that Peel had originally envisaged. Since there was heated debate over whether the police should even be uniformed at all (due to fears of a European-style gendarmerie), this was undoubtedly a wise move. Rowan did, however, insist that his men were drilled and laid down the highest standards of conduct, dismissing men for the slightest infringement even before the police had begun patrolling the streets of London. During the first two years of the force's existence, half of its original constables were dismissed, mainly for drunkenness, absenteeism, and frequenting pubs and fraternising with prostitutes while on duty. Officers were to ensure that they treated members of the public with respect and courtesy at all times. On the other hand, Rowan insisted that his senior officers treat their men with kindness and fairness and without undue harshness or authoritarianism. On 16 September 1829, the two Commissioners personally swore in their new constables at the Foundling Hospital. The new force first took to the streets at 6:00 p.m. on 29 September.

=== As Commissioner ===
For 21 years, Rowan served as Commissioner. The early years were difficult, as the new force faced opposition from the Whigs, who had opposed its formation and formed a new government four years afterwards, and the London magistrates and parish vestries, many of whom were none too keen on losing their own parish constables and in some cases continued to employ the services of the Bow Street Runners.

The trouble with the Whigs came to a head in 1834, when the government demanded that Rowan and Mayne dismiss Inspector Squire Wovenden and his divisional commander, Superintendent Lazenby, after a prostitute falsely accused Wovenden of raping her in a cell and Lazenby refused to discipline him. The Commissioners felt obliged to dismiss the two officers for the good of the force, but refused to accept their guilt and wrote to the government in protest. This paid off when the consequent Parliamentary Select Committee on the Police reported on 13 August, backing the Metropolitan Police (although Wovenden and Lazenby were never reinstated), removing the power of the magistrates over them, and abolishing most of the other constables in London (including the Bow Street Runners, many of whom transferred to the police). In 1835, Lord John Russell, the Home Secretary, even agreed to pay compensation to officers injured on duty.

On 6 March 1848, Rowan's achievements and those of his force were acknowledged when he was made a Knight Commander of the Bath (KCB). In 1850, aged nearly 68 and having been diagnosed with colon cancer, he retired. He died at his residence in Norfolk Street (now known as Dunraven Street), Park Lane, London on 8 May 1852, and his remains were deposited in Catacomb B beneath the Anglican Chapel of Kensal Green Cemetery six days later.

Rowan was a bachelor and an evangelical Anglican. His principal hobbies were salmon fishing and shooting, often using as a base Floors Castle in Scotland, seat of his friend, James Innes-Ker, 6th Duke of Roxburghe.

== Notes ==
Police appointments
New title	Commissioner of Police of the Metropolis; 1829–1850	Succeeded by Richard Mayne
