= Richard Mayne =

English barrister and joint Commissioner of Police of the Metropolis

Sir Richard Mayne KCB
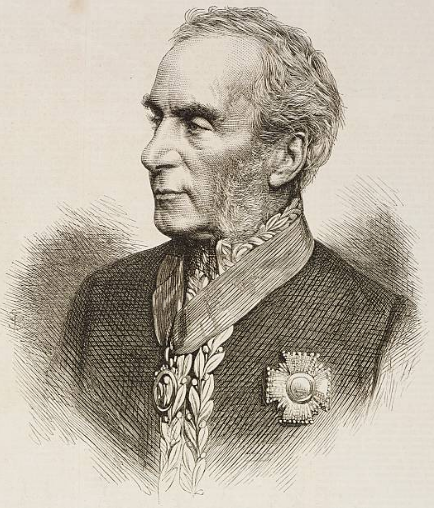
- Portrait of Mayne from The Illustrated London News, volume LIV, 9 January 1869

Commissioner of Police of the Metropolis
- In office 7 July 1829 – 26 December 1868 Serving with Charles Rowan (1829—1850) and William Hay (1850—1855)
- Monarchs: George IV; William IV; Victoria
- Prime Minister: The Duke of Wellington; The Earl Grey; The Viscount Melbourne; Robert Peel; Lord John Russell; The Earl of Derby; The Earl of Aberdeen; Viscount Palmerston; Benjamin Disraeli; William Ewart Gladstone
- Home Secretary: Robert Peel; The Viscount Melbourne; Baron Duncannon; The Duke of Wellington; Henry Goulburn; Lord John Russell; The Marquess of Normanby; Sir James Graham and others
- Preceded by: Office created
- Succeeded by: Douglas Labalmondière (acting)

Personal details
- Born: 27 November 1796 Dublin, Kingdom of Ireland (now Republic of Ireland)
- Died: 26 December 1868 (aged 72) Belgravia, London, United Kingdom
- Resting place: Kensal Green Cemetery, London, United Kingdom
- Education: Trinity College, Dublin (BA); Trinity College, Cambridge (MA)

Sir Richard Mayne KCB (27 November 1796 – 26 December 1868) was a barrister and the joint first Commissioner of Police of the Metropolis, the head of the London Metropolitan Police (1829–1868). With an incumbency of 39 years, he remains the longest-serving Commissioner in the force's history, as well as the youngest on his appointment.

== Early life and career ==
Mayne was born in Dublin, the son of Judge Edward Mayne and Sarah Fiddes, their fourth son out of a total of thirteen children. He gained his BA from Trinity College, Dublin in 1818 and his MA from Trinity College, Cambridge, in 1821. He was called to the Bar at Lincoln's Inn on 9 February 1822 and commenced practice on the Northern Circuit. In 1814 he and his eldest brother Charles made a tour of the continent.

== Second Joint Commissioner ==
As a rising star of the English Bar, Mayne applied in 1829 to be one of the Joint Commissioners of the new Metropolitan Police and was selected without interview. His senior colleague was to be Lieutenant-Colonel Charles Rowan. Rowan was to provide the discipline and organisational skills, while Mayne was to provide the legal expertise. They took up their new appointments on 7 July 1829 and were to become firm friends, working closely together until Rowan's retirement 21 years later. Later that month, they moved into their offices in 4 Whitehall Place and set about the monumental task of creating the new police force from nothing. On 29 August, they were sworn in as Justices of the Peace by Lord Chief Baron Sir William Alexander. On 16 September, the two Commissioners personally swore in their new constables at the Foundling Hospital. The new force first took to the streets at 6:00 p.m. on 29 September.

Mayne was responsible for the second section of the General Instruction Book, which laid down the legal standing and powers of a police officer and the law he was required to enforce. These instructions are still the basis of the powers of a British police constable and made it clear that police officers did (and do) not have carte blanche to give orders to private citizens without a warrant from a magistrate. Private citizens could make complaints against police officers and pursue them in the courts if necessary. It was not a police officer's job to enforce his own morality or that of a particular section of society.

Mayne was a more rigid and abrasive man than Rowan, and frequently clashed with Samuel Philipps, the Permanent Secretary of the Home Office, who believed that the Commissioners should answer to him and his officials, and not just to the Home Secretary. It was a mutual dislike, and although Rowan was more tactful, the Metropolitan Police and Home Office were at odds for sixty years. In 1848, Mayne was appointed Companion of the Order of the Bath (CB). Since Rowan was at the same time appointed Knight Commander of the Order of the Bath (KCB), there were suggestions in the press that Mayne may have been deliberately passed over (although in fact Rowan had held the CB for his military services since 1815 and was therefore simply being promoted in the order).

== First Joint Commissioner ==
In 1850, Rowan retired, and Mayne expected to become sole Commissioner. However, the Home Office decided that a military man should also be appointed and Captain William Hay became Second Commissioner. In 1851, Mayne took personal charge of policing at the Great Exhibition. This angered Hay, who believed that as military commissioner he should have had the job, and he immediately began protesting. However, Mayne's policing at the Great Exhibition was so successful that he was finally appointed Knight Commander of the Order of the Bath (KCB).

== Sole Commissioner ==
In 1855, Hay died, and the Metropolitan Police Act 1856 laid down that in future there should be a single Commissioner, with two Assistant Commissioners. For the next thirteen years, Mayne ran the Metropolitan Police single-handedly.

As sole Commissioner, however, Mayne became increasingly aloof and distant from both the public and his men. He was feared and respected by his men, but not loved as Rowan had been, lacking the older man's talent for conciliation and explanation. He embraced the new Victorian 'morality' introduced by Prince Albert and instructed his men to enforce regulations that were seen by many as petty and unnecessary (such as forbidding children to throw snowballs in public places). In fact, in many ways his new attitude was conflicting with the instructions written by him as a younger man; now the police were very much enforcing middle-class morality and were treating the gentry and aristocracy with a deference that sometimes interfered with their duties. Senior officers also started to be drawn from the officer classes, which conflicted with the original idea that only the Commissioners should be appointed from these classes. This issue was not resolved until the 1940s.

In 1866, Mayne took personal charge of suppressing the Hyde Park demonstration, and lost control, suffering physical injury himself. The Home Secretary, Spencer Walpole, let him take full blame, although he did refuse his resignation. In 1867, his resignation was again refused after the police mishandling of the Clerkenwell bombing.

== Death and legacy ==
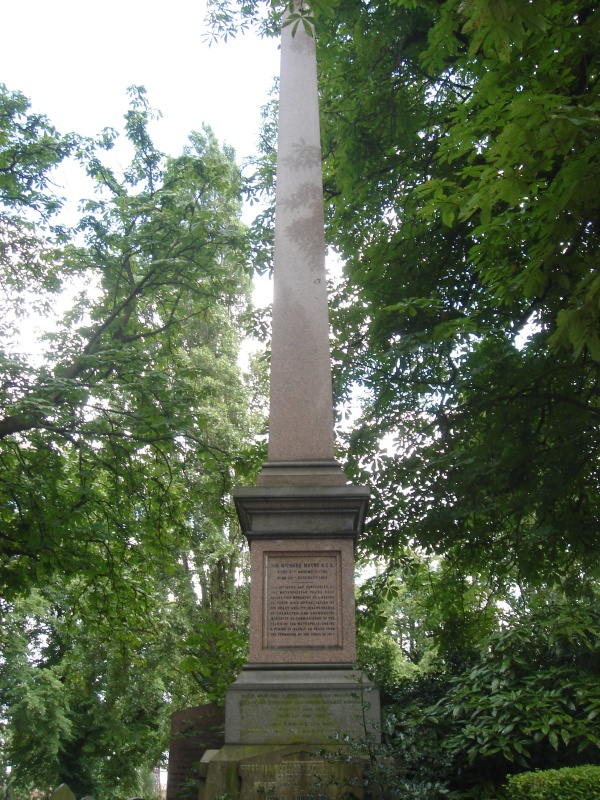
Funerary monument, Kensal Green Cemetery, London

Mayne died, tired and embittered, at his home in Chester Square on Boxing Day 1868. Although he had made mistakes, he had achieved astonishing things. The original force of less than 1,000 men had grown during his commissionership to nearly 8,000. The area it policed had increased to ten times its original area, and the idea had spread to every county and town in the country. Mayne was buried in Kensal Green Cemetery, London. He was survived by his widow, Georgina Marianne Catherine, eldest daughter of Thomas Carvick of Wyke Manor, Yorkshire, whom he had married in 1831, and children including his son, Rear-Admiral Richard Mayne of the Royal Navy.

In the television film The Suspicions of Mr Whicher (2011) and its 2013 sequel he was played by Tim Pigott-Smith.

== Footnotes ==
Police appointments
Preceded by First incumbent	Second Joint Commissioner of Police of the Metropolis; 1829–1850	Succeeded by William Hay
Preceded by Sir Charles Rowan	First Joint Commissioner of Police of the Metropolis; 1850–1855	Succeeded by Last incumbent
Preceded by First incumbent	Commissioner of Police of the Metropolis; 1855–1868	Succeeded by Douglas Labalmondière (Acting)
