= Hyslop =

Hyslop is a surname originating in Scotland. It may refer to:

- Beatrice Fry Hyslop (1899-1973), American historian
- Bianca Hyslop, Māori dancer and choreographer in New Zealand
- Christian Hyslop (born 1972), footballer
- Fiona Hyslop (born 1964), Scottish politician
- Geddes Hyslop (1900-1988), British architect
- Guillermo Hyslop (1905-1993), Mexican and American businessman
- Helen Hyslop
- Hector Hyslop (1840–1920), English cricketer
- Ian Hyslop, British rower
- James Hyslop (Disambiguation)
  - James H. Hyslop (1854–1920), American psychologist and psychic researcher
- Jane Hyslop (Disambiguation)
- Jeff Hyslop (born 1951), Canadian actor
- Jenny Hyslop (1898-1989), Scottish community leader
- Jocelyn Hyslop (1897-1974), Australian social worker
- Joshua Hyslop, Canadian folk-pop singer-songwriter
- Kenny Hyslop (born 1951), Scottish drummer
- Kirk Hyslop (born 1889, date of death unknown), Canadian architect
- Ricky Hyslop (1915–1998), Canadian violinist, conductor, composer, and arranger
- Robin Maxwell-Hyslop (1931–2010), British Conservative Party politician
- Sandra Hyslop (born 1990), British canoeist
- Sandy Hyslop (born 1964), Australian rules footballer
- T. B. Hyslop (1865-1933), British physician specialising in mental health
- Tommy Hyslop (1874–1936), footballer
- Wade A. Hyslop Jr., American politician
- William D. Hyslop (1951-2022), American attorney

== Middle name ==
- Edward Hyslop Milligan (1922-2020), Quaker historian
- General William Hyslop Sumner (1780-1861), American lawyer, soldier, and writer
- John Hyslop Bell (c. 1833–1920), Scottish journalist, newspaper owner and editor
- John Hyslop Steele (1926-2013), British oceanopher

== See also ==
- Hislop
- Heslop
