= Joseph Walton (convict) =

Convict and settler of Western Australia

Joseph Walton (born 1830) was a convict transported to Western Australia. The son of a watchmaker, Walton was born in British North America, but it was in England on 19 July 1851 that he was convicted of burglary and sentenced to ten years' penal servitude. Walton was transported to Western Australia on Dudbrook, arriving in February 1853. After obtaining his ticket of leave, he worked as a carpenter. He received his conditional pardon in July 1856, and the following month he married Fanny Kenney. Over the next few years he worked in the Avon and Greenough districts; his wife did not accompany him and the fact that he was married was not known. Walton took up land at Greenough, and built a hotel there. Later he won a number of contracts to build government buildings, including a one-room school, a police station and a courthouse.

In the late 1860s and early 1870s Greenough suffered severely from flood, bushfire, wheat rust and sheep scab. Correctly anticipating a recession, Walton sold his hotel in 1872, and purchased a small coastal trading boat, Alexandra. In December the following year, he married Georgina Roe, daughter of James Elphinstone Roe. The couple then sailed for Singapore, where they had a son. Eventually Georgina Roe discovered her husband's bigamy, and in 1876 Walton left Singapore for Hong Kong. He did not return.

== General references ==
- Erickson, Rica (1983). "James Elphinstone Roe: Schoolmaster and Journalist". In Erickson, Rica (ed.). The Brand on his Coat: Biographies of some Western Australian Convicts. Nedlands: UWA Publishing. pp. 301–321. ISBN 0-85564-223-8. LCCN 84145691. OCLC 12051617. OL 2914148M. Wikidata Q133820754.
- Rica Erickson, ed. (1988). Bicentennial Dictionary of Western Australians: Pre-1829 – 1888. Vol. 4, R–Z. Nedlands: UWA Publishing. p. 3192. ISBN 0-85564-277-7. LCCN 88151753. OCLC 19221630. OL 2102384M. Wikidata Q115122719.
