= Alfred Chopin =

Convict and settler of Western Australia

Alfred Chopin (1846 – October 1902) was a convict transported to colonial Western Australia. He became one of Western Australia's first portrait photographers.

Nothing is known of Alfred Chopin's early life, but on 4 December 1865 both he and his brother William were convicted in the Manchester courts and sentenced to be transported. Alfred Chopin was convicted of receiving stolen goods, and received a sentence of ten years. His brother was convicted of uttering forged notes and was sentenced to twenty years. The two brothers were transported to Western Australia on board Norwood, which arrived at Fremantle on 13 July 1867.

In February 1869, Alfred Chopin received a free pardon, having been falsely accused. He then obtained a confectioner's licence and opened a small shop in Perth. When his brother obtained his ticket of leave, Alfred employed William in his shop for a short time. In March 1872, Alfred Chopin married Ellen Mary McNamara; they would have eight children.

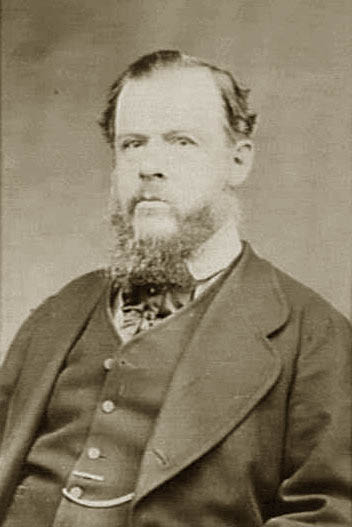
Portrait by Alfred Chopin

In 1872, Chopin started a business as a photographer. The governor commissioned him to take some photographs "as a token of official remorse" for his wrongful conviction and imprisonment, and thereafter Chopin advertised himself as "by appointment to His Excellency". Because of the historical significance of some of the officials that Chopin was commissioned to photograph, a number of his portraits have been preserved, including portraits of Frederick Barlee, Malcolm Fraser and Luke Leake. During the 1870s the photography market became very competitive, and Chopin began to tour country districts in search of custom. His business declined nonetheless, and in June 1877 he was declared bankrupt. According to Erickson, "many an old colonial family album of photographs is the richer for his work".

In his later years, Chopin lived at Guildford, and worked as a mechanic. He died at his home in October 1902.

== See also ==
- List of convicts transported to Australia

== Sources ==
- Erickson, Rica (1983). "K. M. Stout & Alfred Chopin". In Erickson, Rica (ed.). The Brand on his Coat: Biographies of some Western Australian Convicts. Nedlands: UWA Publishing. ISBN 0-85564-223-8. LCCN 84145691. OCLC 12051617. OL 2914148M. Wikidata Q133820754.
