= Hislop =

- Language: English

Other names
- Variant form: Heslop

Hislop is a surname of Lowlands Scottish origin. It derives from the place Hislop on Hazelhope Burn in Roxburghshire. A related surname is Heslop.

== Notable people sharing the surname Hislop ==
- Alexander Hislop, Scottish minister of religion
- Charles Hislop, Cayman Islands entrepreneur
- David Hislop, Australian cross-country skier
- George Hislop, Canadian gay activist
- Ian Hislop (born 1960), editor of British satirical magazine Private Eye
- John Hislop, convict deported to Australia
- John Hislop (teacher), (1821–1904), New Zealand educationalist and father of Thomas William Hislop
- Joseph Hislop, Scottish singer
- Lawrence Hislop, Trinidad and Tobago politician
- Michael Clyde Hislop (born 1955), Australian botanist
- Percy Hislop, Scottish footballer
- Peter Hislop, American mathematician
- Shaka Hislop, football goalkeeper born in England to parents from Trinidad and Tobago
- Steve Hislop, Scottish motorcycle racer
- Thomas William Hislop (1850–1925), Mayor of Wellington, New Zealand
- Thomas Hislop (mayor) (1888–1965), son of above, also Mayor of Wellington
- Victoria Hislop, British author
- Will Hislop (born 1993), British actor and writer

== See also ==
- Hyslop
- Heslop
