= James Humphrey (convict) =

Ex-convict teacher and settler of Western Australia

James White Humphrey (1832–1898) was a convict transported to Western Australia. He was one of only 39 such convicts from the 9721 convicts transported to the colony to overcome the social stigma of convictism to become ex-convict school teachers.

Born in the United Kingdom in 1832, Humphrey worked as a clerk until convicted of forgery and sentenced to transportation. Erickson states that he was transported for life, but other records state fifteen years. Humphrey arrived in Western Australia on board Stag in 1855, and two years later he received his ticket of leave. For some time he was self-employed in Perth before working for William Locke Brockman until 1860, when he received a conditional pardon.

In 1863, Humphrey was appointed to a teaching post at Quindalup, and the following year he married Mary (Bertha) Tapping at Fremantle. When his request for a salary increase was refused in 1868, he resigned as a teacher and spent the next five years working as a postmaster, bootmaker and agent at Quindalup. He then spent two years working as an auctioneer and agent at Fremantle. From 1875 to 1878, he was headmaster at Newcastle, then worked as an accountant in Perth for some time. In 1885, he advertised himself as a storekeeper in Perth. Ten years later he visited Melbourne before returning to live in the Canning district. He died in 1898.

== General references ==
- Erickson, Rica (1983). "Schoolmasters". In Erickson, Rica (ed.). The Brand on his Coat: Biographies of some Western Australian Convicts. Nedlands: UWA Publishing. ISBN 0-85564-223-8. LCCN 84145691. OCLC 12051617. OL 2914148M. Wikidata Q133820754.
