= Cornelius Hardy =

Ex-convict teacher and settler of Western Australia

Cornelius William John Hardy, or Hardey, (born 1831 or 1833, (Note: Erickson claims 1831, but other records state that he was 23 years old in 1856.) date of death unknown) was a convict transported to colonial Western Australia, later to become one of the colony's ex-convict school teachers.

In 1856, he was working as a clerk in the General Post Office when he and two other clerks were caught stealing money from letters. On 9 March 1856, Hardy was sentenced to fourteen years' transportation. He arrived in Western Australia on board Nile in January 1858. After receiving his ticket of leave, he was employed as a tutor by another convict, Frederick Morrell, before being appointed government schoolteacher at Northam in 1865. Attendance at the school dwindled and the school was eventually closed. Hardy then found other work in Northam, and was later elected to the committee of the Northam Mechanics' Institute.

== General references ==
- Erickson, Rica (1983). "Schoolmasters". In Erickson, Rica (ed.). The Brand on his Coat: Biographies of some Western Australian Convicts. Nedlands: UWA Publishing. ISBN 0-85564-223-8. LCCN 84145691. OCLC 12051617. OL 2914148M. Wikidata Q133820754.
