= Ex-convict school teachers in Western Australia =

Following Western Australia's convict era, 37 ex-convicts were appointed school teachers in the colony. The appointment of such a large number of ex-convicts to what was considered a respectable government position was highly unusual for a penal colony, as the social stigma of conviction usually excluded ex-convicts from such positions.

The appointment of a large number of ex-convicts as school teachers was largely due to the poor levels of education in the generation of Western Australians who had been children when the Swan River Colony was first settled. Many of them were illiterate or barely literate, and so unsuitable for appointment as school teachers. Those settlers who did have a good education were in high demand, and were not attracted to the low wages offered for teachers. On the other hand, educated convicts had little prospect of obtaining better wages or conditions than those available to teachers, and the position offered a chance to overcome the social stigma of conviction and obtain a respectable position in society. Although some settlers considered ex-convicts unfit to become teachers, most parents preferred that their children be educated by ex-convicts than not at all. Consequently, a total of 37 convicts were appointed school teachers in Western Australia between 1853 and 1900. Erickson (1983) has suggested that the use of ex-convict school teachers played an important role in the gradual breaking down of the social stigma of convictism.

== List of ex-convict school teachers of Western Australia ==
This is a list of ex-convict school teachers of Western Australia. Unless otherwise noted, all information comes from Rica Erickson's The Brand on His Coat and the convict ship passenger lists provided on the Western Australian Convicts 1850-1868 website.

Name	Schools	Biographical notes
John Allsop	Jarrahdale 1875	Born in 1830; worked as a labourer; sentenced to eight years' penal servitude in 1865 for uttering a counterfeit coin; transported to Western Australia on the Corona
Thomas Beeho	Ferguson 1869	Born in 1836; worked as a clerk; sentenced to ten years' penal servitude in 1864 for robbery with violence; transported to Western Australia on the Vimeira; died in 1893
Thomas Berwick	Jarrahdale 1879–91	
William Brooks	Greenhills (Northam) 1860–64, 1868–72, Upper Swan 1865, Gwalla (Northampton) 1865	Born in 1834; worked as a cellarman; sentenced to a lifetime of penal servitude in 1856 for uttering forged bank notes; transported to Western Australia on the Edwin Fox
Thomas Henry J. Brown	Ferguson 1866–1869	Born in 1821; worked as an architect; sentenced to ten years' penal servitude in 1862 for forgery of money orders; transported to Western Australia on the Lord Dalhousie; died in 1882
William Carmichael	Ferguson 1865	Born in 1827; worked as a clerk in the army; sentenced to penal servitude for life in 1854 for desertion; transported to Western Australia on the Sultana
William J. Carpenter	York 1869, Quindalup	Born in 1812; worked as an auctioneer; sentenced to a lifetime of penal servitude in 1855 for forgery; transported to Western Australia on the Runnymede
Fred Carter	Seven Springs (Coorinja) 1870, Bejoording 1871–74, Gwalla (Northampton) 1875, Ludlow 1876	
William Chopin	Mourambine 1879–83	Born in about 1835. A gunsmith by trade, he had a lifelong interest in sports, especially horseracing, and he was an outstanding rider and trainer of horses. In 1865, Carter was found guilty of a felony by the Birmingham courts, and sentenced to ten years' penal servitude. The following year, he was transported to Western Australia aboard Corona, arriving in December 1866
Thomas Duggan	Goomalling c. 1869–?, Newcastle 1879–81	Born 1822, a schoolmaster of Ballincollig, County Cork. In 1865 sentenced to 10 years for treason for administering the Fenian oath, transported on Hougoumont to Fremantle in 1867, died in 1913
Joseph Farrell	Australind 1861–64	Born in 1828; worked as a clerk; sentenced to fifteen years' penal servitude in 1854 for embezzlement; arrived in Western Australia on the Runnymede
Thomas Fisher	Bejoording 1869	Born in 1831; worked as a ship's steward; sentenced to twenty years' penal servitude for robbery with violence in 1857; transported to Western Australia on the Edwin Fox
Cornelius Hardy	Northam 1865	
James Hasleby	Greenhills (Northam) 1868–70, Dumbarton (Toodyay) 1876–77, Gwalla (Northampton) 1878–93	Born 1833, in 1864 sentenced to eight years' penal servitude for embezzlement, transported to Western Australia on Norwood. In 1893 appointed Clerk of the Local Court at Northampton, died 1903
George Haywood	Newcastle 1865–66, Toodyay Steam Mill school 1867–72	Born in 1828; worked as a clerk; sentenced to penal servitude for life for forgery of a money order in 1847; transported to Western Australia on the Ramillies; died in 1873
Adolph Hecht	Marrinup 1869, York 1869–70, Parkfield 1871–72	Born in 1844; worked as a clerk; sentenced to ten years' penal servitude for forgery in 1864; transported to Western Australia on the Vimiera
John James Henry Hislop	Bunbury 1853–62	
James Murgatroyd Hubbard	Wicklow Hills 1872, Newcastle 1873–75, Guildford	
James White Humphrey	Quindalup 1863–68, Newcastle 1875–78	
James Waterson Johnston	Dongara 1874–92	Born about 1838, Edinburgh, Scotland; worked as a lithographic printer; sentenced to ten years' penal servitude for robbery in 1858; transported to Western Australia on board the Palmerston in 1861; died 13 May 1911
William Frederick Jones	Picton 1859–70	Born in 1827, Jones was the mate on a trading ship in his youth. He eventually qualified as a ship's master, but in March 1856 he arrived in Western Australia aboard William Hammond, having been transported for fifteen years for uttering a forged bank note.
William Henry Leach	Capel 1869–70, Australind (Ludlow) 1870–74, 1877	Born in 1815; worked as a surveyor and builder; sentenced to ten years' penal servitude for shooting with intent in 1864; transported to Western Australia on the Vimeira
James Henry Lloyd	Northam 1866–87	
Daniel McConnell	Minninup 1865–72, Capel 1867, Parkfield 1873–75, Lockeville 1876	Born in 1820; worked as an attorney; sentenced to fifteen years' penal servitude for "forging and using and uttering"; transported to Western Australia on the Nile
Robert Mewburn	Mandurah 1872–91	
Thomas Matthew Palmer	Albany 1858-91	
George Pearson	Springhill 1869–72, Beverley (North) 1875–77, Greenough 1877–79, Quellington 1889	Born in 1835; worked as a clerk; sentenced to ten years' penal servitude in 1862 for uttering forged bank notes; transported to Western Australia on the Clara
William Henry Perrin	Wongamine (Buckland) 1871–1900	
Theodore Richards	Katrine 1864–74, Wicklow Hills 1875–85	Born in 1818, Richards had a wife and one child and was working as a clerk and commercial traveller in 1858, when he was convicted of embezzlement and sentenced to ten years' penal servitude.
James Elphinstone Roe	Central Greenough 1867–70, Lower Greenough 1868	
Octavius Ryland	Upper Swan 1864, Upper Greenough 1864–69, Dongara 1869, Serpentine Bridge 1870–80, 1884	Born in London in 1800 and baptised on 24 June of that year, Octavius Ryland was the eight son of Richard Ryland and Harriet Croft, daughter of Sir Archer Croft, baronet. Ryland married Mary Ann Muggeridge on 27 September 1826. By 1850, he was widowed with two children, and working either as a corn or coin dealer; these are alternative transcriptions of the handwritten records. That year, he was tried at the Old Bailey for extortion, and on 10 June was sentenced to 15 years' penal servitude. He spent two years at the Newgate Jail, including nine months of solitary confinement.
John O. Simpson	Ludlow 1875	Born in 1831; worked as a clerk; sentenced to a lifetime of penal servitude for burglary in 1863; transported to Western Australia on the Merchantman; died in 1879
Stephen Montague Stout	Australind 1859–61, Pensioners' Barracks (Perth) 1873–78, Geraldton 1878-79	Born in 1829; worked as a land agent and surveyor; sentenced to fourteen years' penal servitude for forgery in 1856; transported to Western Australia on board the Lord Raglan; died in 1886; also known as Stephen West; founding editor of the Victorian Express
James Tucker	Bejoording 1870–?, Wicklow Hills 1871, South Greenough 1874	Born in 1818; worked as a clerk; sentenced to a lifetime of penal servitude for shooting with intent in 1854; transported to Western Australia on the William Hammond
Thomas Ward	Seven Springs (Coorinja) 1868, Marrinup 1873–74	Born in 1826; worked as a commission agent; sentenced to seven years' penal servitude for falsifying a death registration in 1863; transported to Western Australia on the Corona
George Newly (or Newby) Wardell	Capel 1868, Parkfield 1869-70	Born in 1830; worked as a solicitor; sentenced to seven years' penal servitude for forgery in 1862; transported to Western Australia on the Lord Dalhousie
John Vernon Warren	Roman Catholic School York 1860-?, Newleyine 1866–68, Wicklow Hills 1867–70, Dumbarton 1872–75	Born in about 1826, Warren worked as a clerk in his youth, but in 1850 he was convicted of forging a bill of exchange, and sentenced to a lifetime of penal servitude. He was transported to Western Australia aboard William Jardine, arriving in August 1852. After receiving his ticket of leave, he taught at the Catholic school at York from 1860, and then at Newleyine from 1866 to 1868.
