= William Chopin =

Convict and settler of Western Australia

William Chopin (1827 – 30 October 1900) was a convict transported to colonial Western Australia. After gaining his ticket of leave he worked as a chemist and later as a provider of illicit abortions.

Nothing is known of William Chopin's early life, but in 1865 he was a widower with one child, and was working as a clerk. On 4 December 1865 both he and his brother Alfred were convicted in the Manchester courts and sentenced to be transported. William Chopin was convicted of uttering forged notes, and received a sentence of twenty years. His brother was convicted of receiving stolen goods, and was sentenced to ten years. The two brothers were transported to Western Australia aboard Norwood, which arrived at Fremantle in July 1867.

For his first seven years in Western Australia, Chopin worked in the prison hospitals at Fremantle and later Albany, dispensing medicine. According to Stevenson (1983), these seven years would have been equivalent to an apprenticeship in pharmacy. Chopin received his ticket of leave on 7 December 1874, and the following month was appointed a dispenser of medicine at the Colonial Hospital. In March he was given a pay rise and extra clerical duties, but by the end of the year he had resigned the position. For a short time he worked in his brother's shop, but by 1876 he was advertising himself as a chemist in St Georges Terrace, Perth.

In 1878, Chopin was appointed government schoolteacher at Mourambine near Beverley. School teaching was one of the few reputable occupations that were open to convicts in Western Australia, as the low pay and poor conditions were not attractive to the very small number of well-educated settlers in the colony. In accepting the appointment, Chopin became one of only 39 ex-convict school teachers in Western Australia. He remained in the position until 1883.

From 1887, Chopin's chemist business gradually declined due to increasing competition with general stores and other chemists. He offset this, however, by becoming a provider of illicit abortions. Between 1892 and 1894 he was arrested three times on charges of attempting to procure abortions. In the first two cases he was acquitted, but in the third case he was found guilty. Sentenced to ten years of penal servitude, he was employed as an orderly at the Invalid Depot. He received a ticket of leave in 1898, and died in Fremantle Prison Hospital on 30 October 1900.

== General references ==
- Stevenson, Lynne (1983). "William Chopin". In Erickson, Rica (ed.). The Brand on his Coat: Biographies of some Western Australian Convicts. Nedlands: UWA Publishing. ISBN 0-85564-223-8. LCCN 84145691. OCLC 12051617. OL 2914148M. Wikidata Q133820754.
