= James Murgatroyd Hubbard =

Ex-convict teacher and settler of Western Australia

James Murgatroyd Hubbard also referred to as John Murgatroyd Hubbard (1839 – 29 October 1899) was a convict transported to Western Australia, who later became one of the colony's ex-convict school teachers.

Born in 1839, Hubbard was working as a clerk in 1863 when he was convicted of forgery and sentenced to twenty years' penal servitude. He was transported to Western Australia aboard Racehorse, arriving in August 1865. After receiving his ticket of leave, he worked for Daniel Connor for a while, then briefly taught at Wicklow school. In 1873 he was appointed school master at Newcastle (now Toodyay). During this time he also employed other ticket-of-leave convicts to dig out sandalwood stumps from land that had been previously cut over.

In March 1875, Hubbard married Amelia Cockburn, the daughter of an early settlers. That he married outside the "bond" class was highly unusual for the time. He then resigned his teaching post and moved to Guildford where he worked as an accountant. From 1879 until 1884 he was secretary at the Boys' Orphanage, and for a short time he also taught there. In 1888 he was appointed clerk to the Guildford Municipal Council.

In April 1898 the Guildford Municipal Council had sort through the courts an order compelling Hubbard to return a ledger and receipt butts he retained after he left the council. The ledger contained accounts of the council from 1893 to 1898, the magistrate hearing the case ordered Hubbard to produce the books within 7 days or he would have to pay the council the sum of £28 15schillings plus costs.

In October 1899 Hubbard had commenced bankruptcy proceedings; at the time of these proceedings the Western Australian Bank held trust titles as security for overdrafts by Hubbard. Hubbard was the trustee for the estate of A J Wroth at the time of the bankruptcy proceedings which were at the arbitration stage of proceedings before Hubbard's death. During arbitration Hubbard had indicated that he was about to receive the sum of £13,000 from the estate of a relative, and it was arranged for him to receive an advance of £10,000. Hubbard made an offer to pay £4,000 to settle his debts. The proceeding were referred back to the judge who was loath to send Hubbard to gaol due to his age and ill health. Arbitration was suspended for fours months while the aunts estate was realised.

Hubbard died in hospital from the effects of poison, a Coronial Inquiry held on 7 November 1899 by Acting District Coroner Dr E Black, found the cause of death was asphyxia caused by strychnine The jury in the inquest concluded that Hubbard died as a result of poisoning, the coroner was unable to distinguish as whether it was accident.

== General references ==
- Erickson, Rica (1983). "Schoolmasters". In Erickson, Rica (ed.). The Brand on his Coat: Biographies of some Western Australian Convicts. Nedlands: UWA Publishing. ISBN 0-85564-223-8. LCCN 84145691. OCLC 12051617. OL 2914148M. Wikidata Q133820754.

== Sources ==
- Police Gazette (PDF). Vol. 46. Perth: Western Australia Police Force. 15 November 1899. pp. 347–352. Wikidata Q133868733.
