= James Lloyd (convict) =

Ex-convict teacher in Western Australia

James Henry Lloyd (c. 1825 – 1898) was a convict transported to Western Australia, who later became one of the colony's ex-convict school teachers.

Born in Ireland in about 1825, nothing is known of his early life. In 1850 he was convicted of stealing a cow, and sentenced to ten years' penal labour. Lloyd was transported to Western Australia aboard Robert Small, which arrived in August 1853. After receiving his ticket of leave, in December 1858 he married Johanna Enright, three of whose brothers were transported on the same ship as Lloyd.

In 1866, Lloyd was appointed government schoolmaster at Northam. The original the original building is still standing, its heritage listed as Banksia Cottage. At the same time as being schoolmaster LLoyd was also the Town Clerk for the Northam Road Board.

He taught there until 1887. During that time he became a respected member of the Northam community, serving as secretary of the Northam Road Board and the Northam Municipal Council, and as registrar of births, deaths and marriages until 1896. He died in 1898.

== General references ==
- Erickson, Rica (1983). "Schoolmasters". In Erickson, Rica (ed.). The Brand on his Coat: Biographies of some Western Australian Convicts. Nedlands: UWA Publishing. ISBN 0-85564-223-8. LCCN 84145691. OCLC 12051617. OL 2914148M. Wikidata Q133820754.

== Sources ==
- "Northam's Hundred Years of Progress". Western Mail. Vol. 48, no. 2484 (2nd ed.). Western Australia. 21 September 1933. p. 11 – via National Library of Australia.
