= James Hislop =

James Hislop or Hyslop may refer to:

== Hislop ==
- John Hislop (James John Henry Hislop, 1825–1909), British-Australian ex-convict teacher
- Jamie Hislop (born 1954), Canadian ice hockey player
- James Gordon Hislop (1895–1972), Australian physician and politician

== Hyslop ==
- James Hyslop (poet) (1798–1827), Scottish poet
- James Hyslop (physician) (1856–1917), Scottish-South African physician and pioneer of psychiatry in South Africa; military medical officer of the South African Medical Service
- James A. Hyslop (1885–1953), American entomologist
- James E. Hyslop (1862–1931), Scottish businessman
- James H. Hyslop (1854–1920), American psychologist and psychic researcher
- James Morton Hyslop (1908–1984), Scottish mathematician and educationalist
