= Thomas Berwick =

Convict and settler of Western Australia

Thomas Berwick (1825–1891) was a convict transported to colonial Western Australia. He was one of 280 such convicts from the 9721 convicts transported to the colony to overcome the social stigma of convictism to become schoolteachers.

== Biography ==
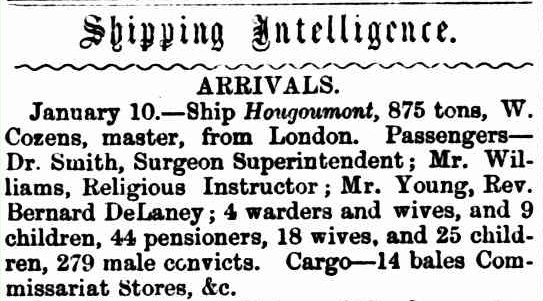
News clipping from the Perth Gazette and West Australian Times, 17 January 1868, announcing the arrival of Hougoumont in Fremantle

Born in 1825, Thomas Berwick worked as a master mariner until he was found guilty of scuttling his ship and sentenced to twenty years transportation. At the time of his sentence he was married with seven children. He arrived in Western Australia on board Hougoumont in January 1868.

In 1882 Berwick bought a block of land, upon which he built a large house in the hope that his family would join him in the colony. When this did not eventuate, he rented the property to an innkeeper. He continued to teach until his death in 1891.

Berwick was one of a very small number of convicts in Western Australia to overcome the social stigma of his conviction and obtain a respectable position in society. Although most respectable occupations were closed to ex-convicts, the colony was desperately short of teachers, yet unable to pay a sufficient wage to attract them. Whereas educated people of the "free" class were not attracted to teaching positions, the positions were attractive to educated ex-convicts, for whom the salary was no lower than other vocations open to them, and the job offered a degree of respectability. In total, 39 ex-convicts became schoolteachers in Western Australia. Ex-convict schoolteachers played an important role in the gradual breaking down of the social stigma of convictism.

== Personal life ==
Thomas Berwick was a third generation 'Ship Master' and was based in Kirkcaldy, in partnership with his father Thomas (1794–1857) who had married Joan Mcdonald (1799–1888) of Fife, Scotland. In 1835 Thomas and Joan had married off their daughter, Elizabeth, to Alexander Selkirk, an innkeeper who had been named for the brother of his ancestor, Andrew Selkirk. That earlier Alexander Selkirk (1676–1721) was the inspiration for Daniel Defoe's character, Robinson Crusoe.

Thomas Berwick married Jeanie Ruxton, whose father George had been similarly accused in 1862 for the destruction of a ship, the 'Kate Kearney'; he was acquitted for lack of evidence. Thomas and Jeanie had eight children: Thomas (1857–1893); Jane (1859–1859); George Ruxton (1860–1897); Joan (1862–1930); Jessie (1864–1923); Katherine (1865–1930); Agnes Jane (1865–1938); Douglas James (1866–1901). Although the strain of supporting such a large family might have induced Thomas to defraud the insurance company, at least 15 similar prior incidents were cited at his trial.

Of Thomas's eight children, Joan and Jessie married brothers Francis Rotherford Gray and Arctic Franklin Gray of Manchester. Upon the death of her husband Thomas in 1893, Kate (née Walters) married her brother-in-law, George Ruxton Berwick, who died shortly after, in 1897. Neither his wife nor any of Thomas Berwick's children journeyed to Australia, though a brief correspondence between Thomas Berwick and his daughter Jessie is archived in the State Library of Western Australia (Acc 3435A). By the time he had earned his ticket of leave his wife Jeanie had died, and all but one of his children had begun career or families in England.

== Sources ==
- Erickson, Rica (1983). "Schoolmasters". In Erickson, Rica (ed.). The Brand on his Coat: Biographies of some Western Australian Convicts. Nedlands: UWA Publishing. ISBN 0-85564-223-8. LCCN 84145691. OCLC 12051617. OL 2914148M. Wikidata Q133820754.
