= Robert Mewburn =

Ex-convict teacher and settler of Western Australia

Robert Wilkinson Mewburn (c. 1827 – 1891) was a convict transported to colonial Western Australia, who later became one of the colony's ex-convict school teachers.

Mewburn was born in about 1827, he lived at Stockton on Tees, Durham, and worked as a printer and clerk, but was convicted of "stealing boots and larceny" and sentenced to seven years' transportation. He arrived in Western Australia on board Pyrenees in May 1853. He received his ticket of leave on arrival in the colony, and was issued with a conditional pardon the following year. He worked for Thomas Peel at first, and later ran a general store at Mandurah. He also acted as a lay preacher in the area.

Mewburn apparently began also began informal school teaching, and on 16 March 1870 he married one of his students, fifteen-year-old Emma Eacott, with whom he would have seven children. In 1872 he organised a petition for a regular teacher in the Mandurah area, and this resulted in him being appointed government schoolmaster. He then built his own school, and taught there until his death in 1891.

== General references ==
- Erickson, Rica (1983). "Schoolmasters". In Erickson, Rica (ed.). The Brand on his Coat: Biographies of some Western Australian Convicts. Nedlands: UWA Publishing. ISBN 0-85564-223-8. LCCN 84145691. OCLC 12051617. OL 2914148M. Wikidata Q133820754.
