= Warawarrup, Western Australia =

Locality in the Shire of Harvey, Western Australia

Warawarrup
- Town
- King Lethbridge Park in 2026
- Interactive map of Warawarrup
- Coordinates: 33.05°S 115.91°E
- Country: Australia
- State: Western Australia
- LGA: Shire of Harvey
- Location: 122 km (76 mi) from Perth; 38 km (24 mi) from Bunbury; 3 km (1.9 mi) from Harvey

Government
  - State electorate: Murray-Wellington
  - Federal division: Forrest

Area
  - Total: 13.4 km^{2} (5.2 sq mi)

Population
  - Total: 137 (SAL 2021)
- Postcode: 6220
Localities around Warawarrup
Cookernup	Cookernup	Hoffman
Harvey	Warawarrup	Hoffman
Harvey	Harvey	Harvey

Warawarrup is a rural locality and town of the Shire of Harvey in the South West region of Western Australia. The South Western Highway and the South Western Railway both run through the locality in a north-south direction.

Between 1979 and 2014, the racetrack at King Lethbridge Park in Warawarrup was the location of the Harvey harness racing club.
