= Mewburn =

Mewburn is a surname. Notable people with the name include:

== Surname ==
- Inger Mewburn (born 1970), Australian academic
- John Clayton Mewburn (1840-1901), British co-founder of IP firm Mewburn Ellis
- Kyle Mewburn (born 1963), New Zealand writer
- Robert Mewburn (1827–1891), Australian teacher
- Sydney Chilton Mewburn (1863–1956), Canadian lawyer, soldier, and politician

== Middle name ==
- T. Mewburn Crook (1869–1949), English sculptor
- Ross Mewburn Elliott (1929–2000), Australian journalist and politician
- Sir Robert Malcolm Mewburn Perks (1892-1979), British baronet
