= Dictionary of Western Australians =

Biographical dictionary of Western Australians up to 1888

Cover of Volume 1 of the Bicentennial Dictionary of Western Australians

The Dictionary of Western Australians and the related Bicentennial Dictionary of Western Australians are two multi-volume biographical dictionaries containing details of European and non-European settlement in Western Australia from the foundation of the Swan River Colony in 1829 until 1888.

Writer and historian Rica Erickson was the head compiler of the books and coordinator of the project which ran from the late 1960s to 1988. The editorial committee included Reg Appleyard, Geoffrey Bolton, Margaret Medcalf, Tom Stannage, Pamela Statham, and Sandra Taylor.

Few states in Australia have been in a position to undertake such a project due to a lack of records and other logistical issues. However the presence, and comprehensive holdings of the volumes of the Western Australia Post Office Directory (which commenced in 1893) have facilitated the checking of names and locations.

The volumes are held as basic reference items in the State Records Office, the J S Battye Library and many public libraries throughout the state.

Western Australia's population in 1850 was approximately 5,000. In 1850, the first of approximately 9,600 convicts arrived and these continued until 1868. With a similar number of free settler arrivals during the convict period, the state's population swelled nearly fivefold in less than 20 years. The discovery of gold in the Kalgoorlie area of Western Australia in the 1880s led to further significant population growth during that period. For these reasons, the first series was separated by the significant years of 1850, 1868 and 1888.

The combined series contain basic biographical details of over 20,000 individuals.

== The Western Australian Biographical Index ==
In the late 1960s, historian, author and genealogist, Rica Erickson, who had previously authored a number of important books and papers relating to Western Australia's history, considered an expansion of her historical records:

I decided then that I had on the average span of life another ten years. (Note: Erickson was then 60 years of age. She died in 2009 at the age of 101.) What else did I want to accomplish; because I'd done just about everything I wanted to do by then…BUT things don't happen like that always. I found myself involved in the biggest project of them all with the approach of the sesquicentennial, the 150th. And 1979 was coming up and I could see in the early 1970s that there would be a resurgence of interest in family trees, like there had been for the 100th. ...knowing that people would be going back and wanting to know what ship their ancestors had come on. I decided because I had made a lot of listings of families around the Toodyay Avon Valley area for my own sake when I was writing the histories of Toodyay and of the Victoria Plains; I knew Sister Albertus [Bain] had a lot of information about the people up Geraldton way; I knew it would be possible to get a lot of information from old family histories and stories that had been written in – not very many of them, but enough; so I thought if we put together this information it would be a good thing. Then the idea came that I'd appeal to the public to send in their own little notes, on practically a page length (nothing much more) giving details of parents and arrival and birth and children and what occupation and what religion and so on.

In the early 1970s Erickson started working on establishing The Western Australian Biographical Index with the assistance of government funding. Requests seeking material were sent out through local libraries, historical groups and the local press in which members of the public were asked to provide genealogical information from the 19th century up to 1914 from their family records including arrivals in Western Australia, occupations, dates of birth, marriages and deaths of their ancestors. Historical material such as diaries, letters, business records, minute books, maps, family trees and photographs, were also sought for copying. Information relating to ordinary citizens, rather than just prominent identities was sought. Submissions for the index closed in December 1979. The highly successful project quickly accumulated vast quantities of primary source material.

Additional data was collected through passenger lists, church registers, almanacs and directories, the index to the WA Government Gazettes, and old newspapers. All the information was condensed and handwritten on individual cards and sorted alphabetically by surname and filed at the J S Battye Library on microfilm.

Originally, it was planned that the Western Australian Biographical Index would be copied and made available in a limited number of locations including the J S Battye Library and some major country towns. As the information and interest grew it was decided to produce it in published form.

== Dictionary of Western Australians ==
Using the Western Australian Biographical Index as a source, the Dictionary series was produced in five volumes, the first three of which were published in time for Western Australia's sesquicentennial year of European settlement in 1979. The fourth and fifth volumes were published in 1985 and 1987.

The five volumes were entitled:

- Volume 1, Early Settlers 1829–1850
- Volume 2, Bond 1850–1868
- Volume 3, Free 1850–1868
- Volume 4, The Challenging Years 1869–1888
- Volume 5, The Golden Years

Volume 1 was based largely on an extensive card index catalogue which had been collected over many years by Hazel Statham, and compiled by her daughter Pamela Statham. It covered the period of free settlement up to the start of the Convict era of Western Australia in 1850. Volumes two and three covered the arrivals of convicts and free settlers, both during the period of convict arrivals respectively.

== Bicentennial Dictionary of Western Australians ==
The Bicentennial series was done in response to continuing public interest in supplying genealogical material to the original Dictionary project team which had accumulated significant additional data which needed to be added to the original series. Due to the quantity of the additional material it was decided to publish an entire new series rather than a supplement to the earlier series. The project received federal government funding as part of Australia's bicentennial celebrations in 1988.

The first part of the bicentennial series was published in five volumes as follows:

- Volume I, pre-1829–1888 A–C
- Volume II, pre-1829–1888 D–J
- Volume III, pre-1829–1888 K–Q
- Volume IV, pre-1829–1888 R–Z
- Volume V, Asian immigrants to Western Australia, 1829–1901 (1988, Anne Atkinson, ISBN 0-85564-287-4)

The second part of the series (volumes VI to X) dealt mainly with Aboriginal genealogical records although Volume IX studied the specific subject of convicts and their impact on Western Australian society after the end of convictism in 1868 in more detail.

- Volume VI, Aborigines of the Albany region, 1821–1898 (1989, Neville Green, ISBN 0-85564-294-7)
- Volume VII, Aborigines of New Norcia, 1845–1914 (1989, Neville Green and Lois Tilbrook, ISBN 0-85564-295-5)
- Volume VIII, Aborigines of the South West region, 1829–1840 (1990, Sylvia Hallam and Lois Tilbrook, ISBN 0-85564-296-3)
- Volume IX, Convicts in Western Australia 1850–1887 (1994, Rica Erickson, ISBN 1-875560-44-0)
- Volume X, Far From Home – Aboriginal Prisoners of Rottnest Island (1999, Neville Green and Susan Moon, ISBN 1-875560-92-0)

== Publication details ==
- Rica Erickson, ed. (1979–1987). Dictionary of Western Australians. Nedlands: UWA Publishing. OCLC 757766995. Wikidata Q5273978.
- Rica Erickson, ed. (1988–1999). Bicentennial Dictionary of Western Australians: Pre-1829 – 1888. Nedlands: UWA Publishing. ISBN 0-85564-278-5. LCCN 88151753. OCLC 19221630. OL 2102384M. Wikidata Q115122719.

== See also ==
- Australian Dictionary of Biography
- Dictionary of Australian Biography
