= James Hasleby =

Ex-convict teacher and settler of Western Australia

James Hasleby (born 1833, Stamford Lincs UK; died 1903, Northampton, Western Australia), was an English convict transported to colonial Western Australia. He was one of only 37 convicts transported to the colony to overcome the social stigma of convictism to become school teachers, and one of only four convicts to be elected a member of a local Education Board. Notwithstanding his previous conviction at the Old Bailey, in 1893 he was appointed Clerk of the Local Court at Northampton.

Little is known of James Hasleby's early life. Born in 1833, he worked as a clerk. At the Old Bailey in February 1864 he pleaded guilty to three indictments for embezzlement, after a former conviction at Preston in October, 1856 and was sentenced to eight years penal servitude.

Hasleby was transported to Western Australia on board Norwood, arriving in July 1867. He received a ticket of leave in 1868, and taught at the Greenhills School, now Irishtown, near Northam until receiving a Conditional Pardon in 1870, when he resigned from teaching. He received his Certificate of Freedom in 1872. In 1873 he advertised himself as a storekeeper and in October 1873 leased the Avon Bridge Hotel. He employed a number of ticket of leave convicts in his businesses. In 1873 he married Eliza Barlow, with whom he would have seven children. Hasleby served as Honorary Secretary of the Northam Farmers' Club, and in 1874 was elected a member of the local Education Board. A prestigious and respected body, only three other convicts achieved membership of a local Education Board: Daniel Connor, Malachi Meagher and Herman Moll. He also became involved in a venture that intended to establish a second, co-operative, Northam flour mill. Hasleby's leasehold of the Avon Bridge Hotel unfortunately coincided with the rise of the temperance movement in Australia in general, and in Northam in particular, and by December 1875 he became insolvent. With the hotel sold by the owner, he returned to teaching. The new owner was no more successful and in 1881 the hotel was shut down.

From 1876 Hasleby taught at Dumbarton, 5 kilometres (3.1 mi) south-east of Toodyay, until 1877 when the school closed. He then took over the Gwalla School at Northampton until his retirement in 1893. He also served as Secretary of the Northampton Roads Board, as clerk to the magistrates and Clerk of the Local Court at Northampton and, in the absence of a clergyman, officiated at local funerals.

Hasleby was one of a very small number of convicts in Western Australia to overcome the social stigma of his conviction and obtain a respectable position in society. Although most respectable occupations were closed to ex-convicts, the colony was desperately short of teachers, yet unable to pay a sufficient wage to attract them. Whereas educated people of the "free" class were not attracted to teaching positions, the positions were attractive to educated ex-convicts, for whom the salary was no lower than other vocations open to them, and the job offered a degree of respectability. In total, 39 ex-convicts became school teachers in Western Australia. Ex-convict school teachers played an important role in the gradual breaking down of the social stigma of convictism.
