= Herman Moll (convict) =

German convict and settler of Western Australia

Herman Joseph Moll (31 January 1838 – 18 December 1882) was a convict transported to Western Australia. He was one of only four such convicts to be elected to the prestigious and respected position of member of a local Education Board.

== Biography ==
Born in Cologne, Germany, the son of Joseph Moll, a tobacco merchant, and Sophia Eick, he went to England 1856 aged 18 where he worked for John Wich, Belgian Consul and Merchant. Moll was a notably devout Catholic. Later described as a "London man of business", he was convicted of forging and uttering in 1861 stealing 150 pounds from Wich. Sentenced to ten years' penal servitude, he was transported to Western Australia on board York, arriving in December 1862.

Moll was described as 176 centimetres (5 ft 9 1/4 in) having greyish hair and hazel eyes. His face is described as full, his complexion dark and his build as middling stout. Moll received his ticket of leave 16 July 1864 and was appointed to teach in the York district.

He later found work as a clerk and accountant for John Monger. He was eventually promoted to manager of Monger's York business. In 1874, Moll was elected to the local Board of Education, a prestigious and respected position attained by only three other ex-convicts: Daniel Connor, Malachi Meagher and James Hasleby. He served only one or two years, resigning to accept the management of Monger's business in Perth.

== Issue ==
He married Agnes Roe, daughter of James Elphinstone Roe in 1874. They were to have four children;

1. Cecilia Mary Agnes Moll (born 1875) who was to marry farmer John White of Jennacubine
2. Sophia Mary Josephine (born 1877) who was to become a Dominican nun and live her later years in South Australia
3. Wilfred Joseph "van Eyck" Moll (born 1879) who was head boy at Hale in the 1890s
4. Herman Phillip Moll (born 1881) who died at the age of two.

== Business ==
In late 1880, Moll moved to Cossack to manage the business of Macrae and Co. He broke a leg in 1882 while disembarking at Cossack and died of complications. It is likely he is buried in an unmarked grave at Cossack.

Wife Agnes Moll as a widow supported her three fatherless children by running a boarding house.
