= Heslop =

Heslop is a surname. Notable people with the surname include:

- Aidan Heslop (born 2002), British diver
- Barbara Heslop (1925–2013), New Zealand immunologist
- Desiree Heslop (born 1961), British singer
- Gavin Heslop (born 1997), American football player
- George Heslop (1940–2006), English footballer
- Gerald Heslop (1879–1913), English cricketer
- Harold Heslop (1898–1983), English writer
- Ian Heslop (1904–1970)), British naturalist and marksman
- J Malan Heslop (1923–2011), American photographer who documented evidence of Nazi war crimes
- John William Heslop–Harrison FRSE (1881–1967), British biologist, father of...
  - Jack Heslop-Harrison FRSE (1920–1998), British botanist
  - Dr George Heslop-Harrison FRSE (1911–1964) entomologist
- Richard Heslop (born 1961), British television and film director
- Richard Henry Heslop (1907–1973), British Special Operations Executive agent
- Richard Oliver Heslop (1842–1916), British Historian, songwriter and lexicographer of North East England
- Simon Heslop (born 1987), English footballer

== See also ==
- Hyslop
- Hislop
