= Josephine Wilson (writer) =

Australian writer and academic

- Born: Lincolnshire, England
- Occupations: Writer and academic
- Writing career
- Language: English
- Years active: 1994-
- Notable work: Extinctions
- Notable awards: 2017 Miles Franklin Award

Josephine Wilson is an Australian novel and electronic literature writer and academic based in Perth, Western Australia. She writes essays, poetry and fiction.

== Biography ==
Wilson was born in Lincolnshire, England, and came to live in Australia with her family at the age of six. She has a Masters of Philosophy from the University of Queensland and a PhD from University of Western Australia (UWA).

Wilson lives in Perth and teaches creative writing and literary theory at Murdoch University. She has been a sessional teacher at UWA and Curtin University, lecturing in performance studies, creative writing, and the history of art and design.

== Literary recognition ==
In September 2017, Wilson won the Miles Franklin Award for her second novel, Extinctions (UWA Publishing, 2016). This book had won the inaugural Dorothy Hewett Award for an unpublished manuscript in 2016. It also won the 2017 Colin Roderick Award, and was shortlisted for the 2017 Prime Minister's Literary Awards.

Wilson was featured as the Open Page guest in the October 2017 issue of Australian Book Review. She was also a writer-in-residence at Yaddo in Saratoga Springs (2019), and an Asialink resident in Shanghai in 2018.

== Research ==
Wilson has collaborated with sociologist Barbara Barbosa Neves on interdisciplinary research combining literature and social science. Together, they developed the concept of "live gerontology," an approach that integrates sociological research with creative works to better understand and represent aging experiences. This collaboration produced academic publications that use creative narratives alongside social science research to explore topics such as loneliness in later life and experiences in aged care settings. Their joint work has been covered in podcasts, media articles, and academic presentations.

Wilson has also co-authored several interdisciplinary research projects. She contributed to a 2024 study examining the introduction of virtual reality technology to older adults in aged care settings; a 2023 paper on using crystallization methodology to understand loneliness in later life; a 2022 article examining care in the COVID-19 context and its role in contemporary humanities critique; and a 2023 conference presentation on an eco-performance soundscape project exploring human relations with time, space, and existence in the Anthropocene age.

== Works ==
=== Electronic Literature ===
Wilson participated in Lux: Tink and Lina Chat which is an array of texts by digital writers.

Her work with Linda Carroli includes:

- *water always writes in *plural was first published in the Progressive Dinner Party, a collection curated by M.D. Coverley, which is now archived in The NEXT Museum, Library, and Preservation Space. This work won the Salt Hill Hypertext award in 1998.
- Cipher, a work using email conversations
- Between the Devil and the Deep Blue Sea

=== Plays ===
- The Geography of Haunted Places (1994) in Allen, Richard and Pearlman, Karen Performing the Unnameable, Sydney: Currency Press.
- Customs (1998)

=== Novels ===
- —— (2005). Cusp. UWA Publishing.
- —— (2016). Extinctions. UWA Publishing. This work, set in 2006, features Fred, a retired engineer and Jan, his neighbor. Gillian Dooley calls this a "Bildungsroman for seniors."

=== Academic articles ===
- Gilson, D., Grehan, H., & Wilson, J. (2022). 'Do We Need to Talk about Prince Harry?': Thoughts on care and the politics of critique. Performance Research, 27(6–7), 221–228. https://doi.org/10.1080/13528165.2022.2198867
- Murray, L. A., Daroy, A., Wilson, J. H., & Zeunert, J. (2023, May 4-5). Anthropoiesis: Eco-Performance project at ECC, Venice Biennale 2023 [Conference presentation]. Environmental Communication: Science Inspired & Arts Delivered, James Cook University, Cairns, QLD, Australia.
- Neves, B. B., Wilson, J., Sanders, A., Kokanović, R., & Burns, K. (2023). 'Live Gerontology': Understanding and Representing Aging, Loneliness, and Long-Term Care Through Science and Art. The Gerontologist, 63(10), 1581–1590. https://doi.org/10.1093/geront/gnad080
- Neves, B. B., Wilson, J., Sanders, A., & Kokanović, R. (2023). Using crystallization to understand loneliness in later life: Integrating social science and creative narratives in sensitive qualitative research. Qualitative Research, 23(1), 38–54. https://doi.org/10.1177/14687941211005943
- Wilding, R., Neves, B. B., Waycott, J., Miller, E., Porter, T., Johnston, J., James, W., Brajanovski, S., Wilson, J., Baker, S., & Caldwell, G. (2024). Introducing virtual reality to older adults: A qualitative analysis of a co-design innovation with care staff. Archives of Gerontology and Geriatrics, 125, 105505. https://doi.org/10.1016/j.archger.2024.105505
- Wilson, J. (2019). Shipwreck, Without Label. Performance Research, 24(8), 69–79. https://doi.org/10.1080/13528165.2019.1718433

== Awards ==
In 2015, her manuscript for Extinctions the inaugural Dorothy Hewett Award and when published, won the 2017 Miles Franklin Literary Award and the Colin Roderick Award, was also shortlisted for the 2017 Prime Minister’s Award for Fiction.
