= Windsor Arms Hotel =

Boutique hotel in Toronto, Ontario

Coordinates: 43.668865°N 79.39123°W

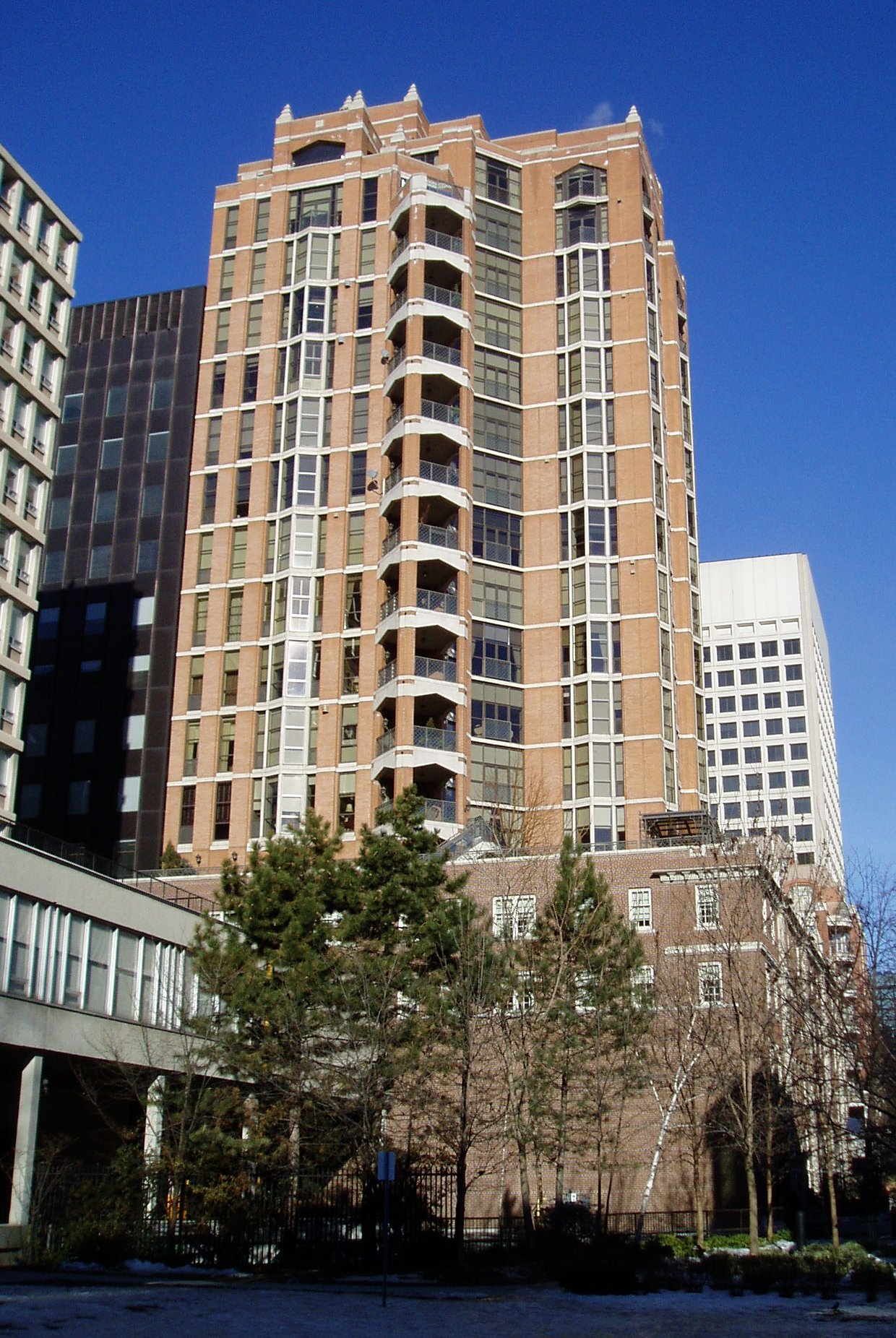
Exterior of the building in 2007

The Windsor Arms is a boutique hotel in Toronto, Ontario, Canada. It is located at 18 St. Thomas Street in the southern part of the Yorkville neighbourhood. The hotel includes a restaurant, tea rooms and a spa.

The neo-Gothic style building was designed by architect Kirk Hyslop of Toronto and built in 1927. It was listed as a historic property by the City of Toronto in 1983, and designated under the Ontario Heritage Act in 1992. Run down by the 1980s, the original hotel closed in 1991. After purchasing the property in 1995, developer George Friedmann commissioned architect Sol Wassermuhl of Page and Steele to rebuild the hotel as a skyscraper that included condominium suites while maintaining the St. Thomas Street façade.

The Toronto International Film Festival was founded at the Windsor Arms in 1976, and the hotel's involvement in the festival still continues.

The hotel has been known to be frequented by celebrities such as Katharine Hepburn, Elizabeth Taylor, Richard Burton, Woody Allen and, more recently, Richard Gere, Britney Spears and Tina Turner. The location was featured in the 1973 film The Paper Chase. It has been used twice by Atom Egoyan in films – Speaking Parts in 1989 and Chloe in 2010.

The Windsor Arms building also contains 25 condominium residences. Square footage per suite ranges from 2,800 to 4,800 square feet (450 m^{2}), with prices between $2,500,000 and $8,000,000.
