= Uduc, Western Australia =

Uduc
- Town
- Interactive map of Uduc
- Coordinates: 33°03′00″S 115°49′00″E
- Country: Australia
- State: Western Australia
- LGA: Shire of Harvey
- Location: 137 km (85 mi) S of Perth; 7 km (4.3 mi) W of Harvey
- Established: 1860s

Government
  - State electorate: Murray-Wellington
  - Federal division: Forrest

Area
  - Total: 72.7 km^{2} (28.1 sq mi)

Population
  - Total: 374 (SAL 2021)
- Postcode: 6220

Uduc is a town in the South West region of Western Australia between Harvey and the Indian Ocean coast at Myalup. It is an agricultural district and was first settled by William Crampton between 1844 and 1860.
