= Guillermo Hyslop =

Mexican and American businessman

- Born: Guillermo Campbell Hyslop Beckmann; 17 July 1905; Parral, Chihuahua, Mexico
- Died: August 1, 1993 (aged 88); El Paso, Texas, US
- Occupation: Businessman
- Spouse: María Aún
- Children: 4 Margarita Hyslop Aún, Elizabeth Hyslop Aún, Guillermo Hyslop Aún, Santiago Hyslop Aún.

Guillermo Campbell Hyslop (17 July 1905, Parral, Chihuahua – 1 August 1993, El Paso, Texas) was a Mexican and American businessman.

== Early life ==
Born in Parral, Chihuahua on July 17, 1905, son of James E. Hyslop and Maria Beckmann, Hyslop came from an influential family, well known in Mexico. Hyslop spent his childhood in the city of Parral, Chihuahua, where he lived with two brothers and four sisters. At the age of 15 years Hyslop moved to El Paso, Texas, where he completed his high school studies.

== Companies and fortune ==
Hyslop began working in the family mining company in 1927, working as a manager of the company "The Guggenheim Co" that operated mines in Mexico, England, Sweden and the United States. In 1930 he and his father, James E. Hyslop, with a capital of $2,000,000, acquired the power company El Paso Electric.

In 1943 Hyslop founded "The Road Oil Co.", an oil company operating in the state of Texas. In 1950 the company became of the 10 largest oil companies in the United States, and in 1963 it was sold to Chevron Corporation.

In 1974, Hyslop and a group of American investors opened the doors of Cielo Vista Mall, a shopping plaza of El Paso, Texas, located on the east side of El Paso on Interstate 10 and Hawkins Blvd.

== Family ==
Hyslop married María Aún, a woman of Syrian descent, from a conservative and influential family of Chihuahua. Hyslop and María had four children, Margarita, Elizabeth, Guillermo and Santiago.

== Death ==
On 1 August 1993 Hyslop suffered a cardiac arrest.
