= Barbara Barbosa Neves =

Portuguese-Australian sociologist

Barbara Barbosa Neves is a Portuguese-Australian sociologist known for her research in aging and technology that focuses on loneliness, social isolation, and digital inequalities among older adults. She is a Senior Horizon Fellow at the University of Sydney, where she leads the AI social science research stream and studies artificial intelligence (AI) and healthy aging at the Sydney Centre for Healthy Societies. Neves holds a PhD in social sciences from the University of Lisbon and Netlab at the University of Toronto. Her research has informed policy, care practices, and technological development.

== Education ==
Neves earned her PhD in sociology from the University of Lisbon and University of Toronto, studying Internet usage and social capital under the supervision of Professor Barry Wellman. She holds a Master of Science in sociology and a degree in communication sciences from the University of Lisbon. During her doctoral studies, she was an invited scholar at the Summer Doctoral Programme at Oxford University’s Internet Institute and a visiting scholar at the University of Oslo’s Department of Media and Communication.

== Career ==
Neves began her academic career as an assistant professor of sociology at the University of Lisbon, where she collaborated with their Centre for Public Administration & Policies and the replanning lab at the University of Aveiro to conduct research on the sociology of technology, aging, and social capital.

She then joined the University of Toronto as a research associate and associate director of the Technologies for Aging Gracefully Lab in the Department of Computer Science, where she led interdisciplinary teams with Professor Ron Baecker developing communication technologies for older adults in nursing homes. Her research focused on examining how information and communication technologies could enhance social connectedness and inclusion among older adults.

Following this, Neves served as a lecturer in sociology at the University of Melbourne and Senior Lecturer in Sociology Monash University, where she expanded her research on loneliness and social isolation among older Australians. She conducted studies on the lived experiences of loneliness among older people living in care homes and those living alone during the COVID-19 pandemic. Her work at Monash included developing mixed methods approaches to studying technology’s role in addressing social isolation and loneliness in later life.

In 2024, Neves was appointed to a Senior Horizon Fellowship at the University of Sydney, where she works at the Sydney Centre for Healthy Societies. Her current research examines how emerging technologies like artificial intelligence, virtual reality, and robotics can benefit rather than exclude older people. She leads projects including an Australian Research Council Discovery Project on loneliness and technology, multiple Medical Research Future Fund grants on dementia, and a national evaluation of the Aged Care Volunteer Visitors Scheme for the Australian Department of Health and Aged Care.

== Research ==
Neves’ research examines the links between social and digital inequalities from a life course perspective, focusing on how emerging technologies—including artificial intelligence, robotics, and virtual and augmented reality—affect social inclusion and social health of older adults. Her studies on loneliness in later life include an ethnographic study in Australian care homes and COVID-19 diary studies that documented how isolation measures disrupted lonely older people’s coping mechanisms.

Neves developed a theoretical model for technology implementation based on strong structuration theory, showing that personal factors, social environments, and prior experiences influence technology use more than age alone. Her work on digital inequalities documents the Matthew effect, where existing advantages lead to greater technological benefits, while her AI research in long-term care identifies ageism and knowledge gaps between developers and care staff.

Neves has contributed theoretically by framing loneliness as “existential inequality” affecting personal dignity; advancing the understanding of the social stigma of loneliness; and, in partnership with Miles Franklin Literary Awardee Josephine Wilson, developing “live gerontology”—an approach combining gerontological research with creative works to better understand and represent aging experiences. She has also developed the concepts of “sociotechnical ageism" (ageism built into technology) and "faux users" (older adults who use digital technology but do not perceive themselves as users because they need help from others, like family).

Her methodological contributions include improving ways to study technology use among older adults via usability and accessibility techniques. Her work includes mixed methods that combine social and computer sciences, such as the “design-in-action” approach, which allows researchers to adjust their methods during longitudinal studies with vulnerable groups when ethical or practical issues come up.

Neves' work has informed social policy and care practices in Canada, Australia, and Portugal; helped improve technology design for older adults, including via the InTouch/FamliNet app to help address loneliness in later life; and been cited by the United Nations, OECD, European Union, Australian Human Rights Commission, and government and policy reports in 13 countries.

== Awards and recognition ==
Neves has received 28 awards internationally, including the George Story Distinguished Lecturer Award at Memorial University (2023), Jacques Leclercq Chair in Digital Technology & Society at the University of Louvain (2019), and recognition as one of the ABC’s Top 5 Scholars in Humanities and Social Sciences in Australia (2019). Her scientific articles have received awards from the Association of Computing Machinery (2021, 2022), Caixa Geral de Depositos (2012), and Mather Institute (2024). Neves has also received over $6 million in funding from scientific and industry organizations across Australia, the European Union, and Canada.

== Professional affiliations ==
Neves has been a Fellow of the Royal Society of Arts (FRSA) since 2022 and a Fellow of the Higher Education Academy (FHEA) since 2023. She is on the editorial board of Sociology, the flagship journal of the British Sociological Association, and a board member of the International Sociological Association’s Working Group on Digital Sociology. From 2011 to 2023, she was an elected board member of the International Sociological Association’s Committee on Family Research.

== Media and public engagement ==
Neves’ research on loneliness, social isolation, and technology has been covered in Australian media outlets including ABC News, SBS, The Guardian, The Age, and The Sydney Morning Herald, as well as in international outlets across North America, Europe, and Latin America. She has authored op-eds for The Conversation and ABC on topics including AI and ageism, loneliness during COVID-19, digital inclusion among older adults, and the role of technology in addressing social isolation.

Neves was interviewed for the SBS documentary “What Does Australia Really Think About Old People?," and has appeared on podcasts including God Forbid, Aged Care Insite, Future Tense, Narrative Now, Sunday Morning, and SBS News In Depth. She has also delivered over 100 invited keynotes and talks across five continents, including at The Australian Loneliness Dialogue Conference, International Congress of Aging Studies, and Massachusetts Institute of Technology.

== Selected publications ==
- Neves, B.B., Franz, R., Judges, R., Beermann, C., & Baecker, R. (2019). "Can digital technology enhance social connectedness among older adults? A feasibility study." Journal of Applied Gerontology, 38(1), 49–72. https://doi.org/10.1177/073346481774136
- Neves, B. B., Fonseca, J. R., Amaro, F., & Pasqualotti, A. (2018). "Social capital and Internet use in an age-comparative perspective with a focus on later life." PLoS One, 13(2), e0192119. https://doi.org/10.1371/journal.pone.0192119
- Neves, B. B., Sanders, A., & Kokanović, R. (2019). "“It’s the worst bloody feeling in the world”: Experiences of loneliness and social isolation among older people living in care homes." Journal of Aging Studies, 49, 74–84. https://doi.org/10.1016/j.jaging.2019.100785
- Neves, B. B., & Vetere, F. (Eds.). (2019). Ageing and Digital Technology: Designing and Evaluating Emerging Technologies for Older Adults. Springer. https://doi.org/10.1007/978-981-13-3693-5
- Neves, B. B., Waycott, J., & Malta, S. (2018). "Old and afraid of new communication technologies? Reconceptualising and contesting the ‘age-based digital divide’." Journal of Sociology, 54(2), 236–248. https://doi.org/10.1177/1440783318766119
