= 1884 Scottish Athletics Championships =

Outdoor track and field competition

- Dates: 28 June
- Host city: Edinburgh, Scotland
- Venue: Powderhall Grounds
- Level: Senior
- Type: Outdoor
- Events: 11

The 1884 Scottish Athletics Championships were the second national athletics championships to be held in Scotland. They were held under the auspices of the Scottish Amateur Athletic Association at Powderhall Grounds, Edinburgh, on Saturday 28 June 1884. Some cycle races were due to be held at the meeting, but on the day the cyclists determined the track was not suitable for their purposes and went instead to Corstorphine.

Several Scottish Native and All-comers records were set during the meet. James Cowie, of London AC, ran 10 seconds in the 100 yards, establishing a record that was equalled on a number of occasions but not beaten, in Scotland, until 1913, and not beaten by a Scottish athlete until 1935. Cowie also set Scottish Native and All-comers records in the 440 yards. Alexander McNeill (Fettes-Loretto) set a Scottish All-comers record in the 120 yard hurdles, and John Harvie (Queen's Park FC) set both Scottish Native and All-comers records in the 3 miles walk. Kenneth Whitton (St George's FC) in winning the shot put had the longest valid amateur throw in Scotland up to that point but it was never ratified as a record. Whitton later became a Lieutenant Colonel and was Life vice-president of the SAAA until his death in 1947.

== Results summary ==
100 yards
Pos	Athlete	Time
1.	James M. Cowie (London AC)	10.0
2.	W. Rodger (St George's FC)	2 1/2 yards
3.	Maurice Wright (Edinburgh Academicals FC)	

440 yards
Pos	Athlete	Time
1.	James Cowie (London AC)	51.2
2.	Arthur Bullock (Edinburgh Un.)	51.6e

880 yards
Pos	Athlete	Time
1.	Telfer Ritchie (St George's FC)	2:02.4

1 mile
Pos	Athlete	Time
1.	David S. Duncan (Royal High School FP)	4:32.8

120 yard hurdles
Pos	Athlete	Time
1.	Alexander McNeill (Fettes-Loretto)	16 3/5
2.	Henry A. Watt (Glasgow Un.)	1 yard

3 miles walk
Pos	Athlete	Time
1.	John Harvie (Queen's Park FC)	23:16
2.	A. Brown (Airdrieonians FC)	24:25
3.	James Caw (St George's FC)	24:45

High jump
Pos	Athlete	Dist
1.	James N. McLeod (Glasgow Un.)	5 ft 5in (1.65m)
2.	Al van der Merwe (Edinburgh Un.)	5 ft 3in (1.60m)

Pole vault
Pos	Athlete	Dist
1.	George Hodgson (Edinburgh & North of England AC)	9 ft 4in (2.84m)
2.	Theophilus Hyslop (Edinburgh Un.)	9 ft 1in (2.77m)

Long jump
Pos	Athlete	Dist
1.	Daniel A. Bethune (Established Church TC)	20 ft 0in (6.09m)
2.	R. G. Taylor (Edinburgh & North of England AC)	18 ft 6in (5.64m)

Shot put
Pos	Athlete	Dist
1.	Kenneth Whitton (Ross County FC)	41 ft 9in (12.72m)
2.	Charles Reid (Edinburgh Academicals)	39 ft 8in (12.09m)

Hammer
Pos	Athlete	Dist
1.	Kenneth Whitton (St George's FC)	98 ft 10 1/2in (30.12m)
2.	Robert Smith (Mauchline FC)	95 ft 1in (28.98m)
3.	Daniel A. Bethune (Est Church TC)	93 ft 0in (28.34m)

== See also ==
- Scottish Athletics
- Scottish Athletics Championships
