= Extinctions (Wilson novel) =

2016 novel by Australian author Josephine Wilson

- Author: Josephine Wilson
- Language: English
- Genre: Literary fiction
- Publisher: UWA Publishing
- Publication date: 20 December 2016
- Publication place: Australia
- Media type: Print
- Pages: 286 pp.
- Awards: 2017 Miles Franklin Award; 2017 Colin Roderick Award
- ISBN: 9781742588988

Extinctions (2016) is a novel by Australian writer Josephine Wilson. It was originally published by UWA Publishing in 2016 and won the Miles Franklin Award the following year, as well as the Colin Roderick Award. It was later published in the United Kingdom and United States.

== Synopsis ==
After the death of his wife and his estrangement from his daughter, Professor Frederick Lothian, former engineer, moves into a retirement village and falls into deep depression. After a series of chance and unfortunate incidents, he meets his neighbour Jan and slowly begins to see life in a different light.

== Publishing history ==
After its initial publication in Australia by UWA Publishing in 2016, the novel was reprinted as follows:

- Serpents Tail, UK, 2018 and 2019
- Tin House Books, USA, 2018
- UWA, Australia, 2020

== Dedication and epigraph ==
- Dedication: "For Christopher Hill, who understands."
- Epigraph: "Who is prepared to deprive life of a significant dénouement?" — Jean Améry

== Critical reception ==
In The Saturday Paper reviewer "LS" noted: "There is great sensitivity and heart in this story of redemption and Wilson can be blackly funny...Despite Fred’s advanced years, Extinctions is akin to a coming-of-age story. Will he mature into a good person? Wilson attempts too much, but Extinctions is a rich and humane novel peopled with compelling characters."

Roslyn Jolly, in the Sydney Review of Books, comments: "Frederick Lothian is a deeply flawed, emotionally stunted, at times repellent character. He has grave sins, both of omission and commission, on his conscience. He has contributed, with varying degrees of responsibility, to the destruction of three young lives. To speak of relationship breakdown does not begin to cover the amount of damage he has done to his marriage. Watching Fred grope his way towards self-insight and accountability is an experience both painful and fascinating, and I found his character convincing as the product of a particular childhood in particular historical conditions."

== Awards ==
- 2017 Miles Franklin Award, winner
- 2017 Colin Roderick Award, winner

== See also ==
- 2016 in Australian literature
