= Fremantle Herald =

Newspaper based in Fremantle, Western Australia

- The 17 August 2013 front page
- Type: newspaper
- Owner: Andrew Smith
- Founded: 1989
- Headquarters: corner of Cliff and Croke Streets, Fremantle
- Sister newspapers: Melville City Herald, Cockburn City Herald and the Perth Voice
- Website: www.fremantleherald.com

Fremantle Herald and similar names have been used for three different newspapers serving Fremantle, Western Australia: The Herald (1867–1886), Fremantle Herald (1913–1919) and a current publication, founded in 1989.

== Colonial Herald ==
James Pearce founded the original Herald in February 1867, publishing weekly. It was pitched at a more working-class audience than its counterparts in Perth at the time, and featured verse, short stories and serials. Pearce was joined by two co-proprietors, William Beresford and James Elphinstone Roe, both of whom, like Pearce, were ex-convicts. The Herald supported social reform and opposed the convict system. Beresford wrote a weekly column, "Chips by a Sandalwood Cutter", which used a fictional character to challenge the morality of the social elite.

In 2013, the Fremantle Local History Collection funded the digitisation of the entire extant collection of the Herald of 1867–1886. The digitisation was carried out by the National Library of Australia, and the scanned archives made available via their Trove search engine.

== World War I ==
In 1913 a new workers' weekly was established, with William Carpenter serving as editor. He lasted less than a year, and subsequently the newspaper became "less friendly" to the labour movement.

This newspaper lasted until 1919, and in May 1921 it was incorporated (along with the Fremantle Times) into the Fremantle Advertiser.

== Modern Herald ==
In 1989, local resident Andrew Smith launched a new Fremantle Herald from a weatherboard house, employing an editor and small team of journalists, production and advertising staff based in East Fremantle, on the corner of King and George Streets. In 1992 the operation was moved to the corner of Cliff and Croke Streets, Fremantle. It now also publishes three titles in other parts of the Perth metropolitan area: the Melville City Herald, the Cockburn City Herald, and the Perth Voice, all of which are letterbox-distributed weeklies. A two-year trial of a paid-for version of the Fremantle Herald failed to gain support from readers and was abandoned in 2005.

== Notes and references ==
- Wilde, W. H.; Hooton, Joy; Andrews, Barry (1994) [1985]. The Oxford companion to Australian Literature (2nd ed.). Melbourne: Oxford University Press. p. 302. ISBN 0-19-553381-X.
