= The Ticket-of-Leave Man =

The Ticket-of-Leave Man or The Ticket of Leave Man may refer to:

- The Ticket-of-Leave Man (play), an 1863 play by Tom Taylor
- The Ticket of Leave Man (1912 film), an Australian film directed by Gaston Mervale
- The Ticket-of-Leave Man (1914 film), an American film
- The Ticket-of-Leave Man (1918 film), a British film directed by Bert Haldane
- The Ticket of Leave Man (1937 film), a British film starring Tod Slaughter

== See also ==
- Ticket of Leave
