= Kirk Hyslop =

Canadian architect

- Born: May 1, 1889; York Township
- Died: Unknown
- Occupation: Architect
- Buildings: Windsor Arms Hotel

Kirk Hyslop (born May 1, 1889, date of death unknown) was an architect in Toronto, Ontario, Canada. He was born May 1, 1889, in Ontario.

Hyslop designed at least two Toronto buildings which have since been designated as historical structures. One is the Windsor Arms Hotel, a neo-Gothic structure built in 1927 The other is the La Plaza Theater, built in 1909 and altered in 1932, although it is not clear whether he was involved in the initial design or the alterations.

== Works ==
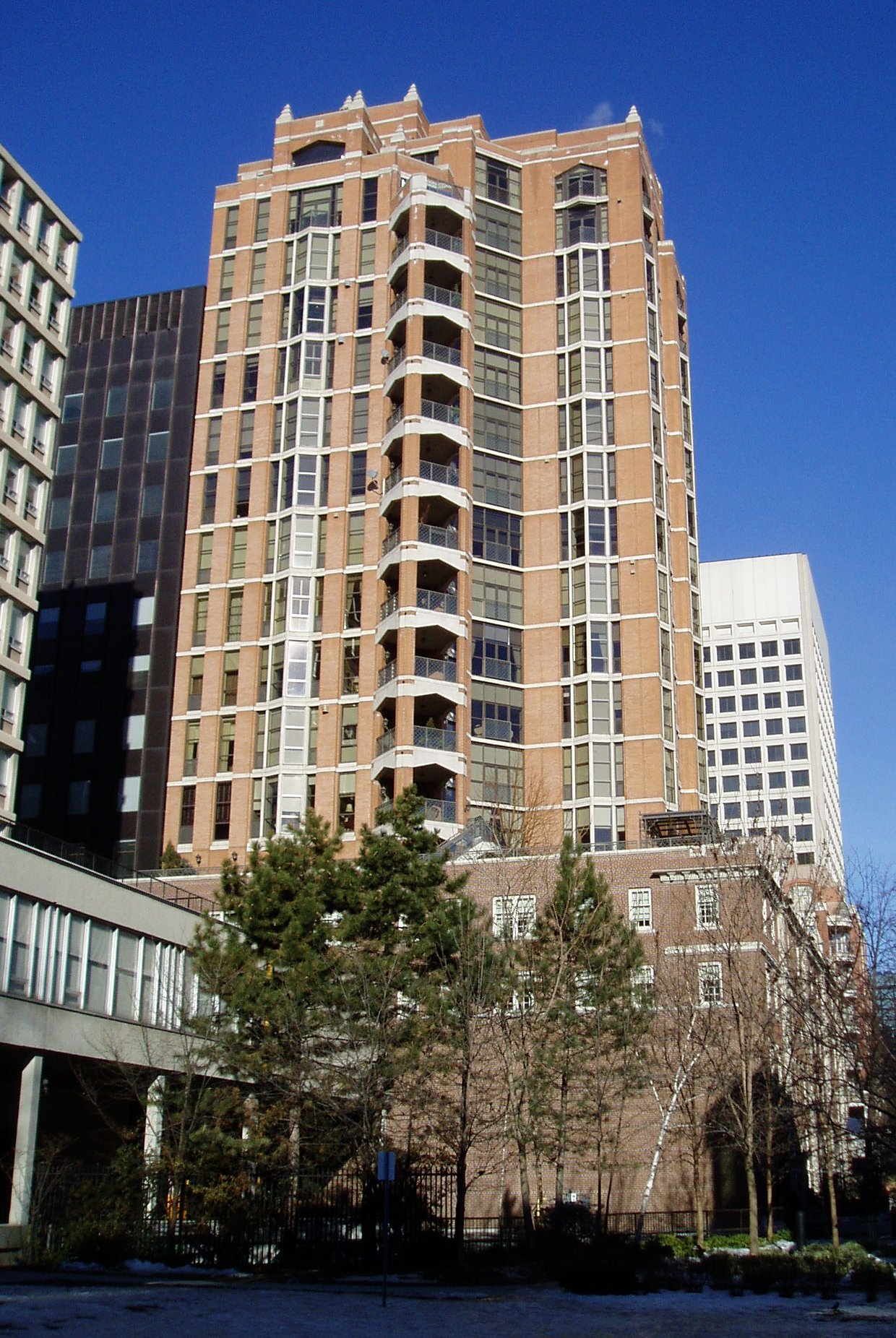
Windsor Arms Hotel
