= Charles Hislop =

Caymanian businessman

Charles Sheldon Hislop (c. 1908 – 12 June 1984) was a Caymanian entrepreneur who, in 1932, began the first public supply of electricity to Grand Cayman.

Hislop was born in 1908, in the district of Bodden Town in the Cayman Islands to parents Lawrence Henry Hislop and Ella Hislop. He was the third of six children. Hislop and his brother, Edward, traveled to Tampa, Florida many times bringing new luxuries back to Grand Cayman. They purchased an electric generator, the Ruston 9HRC, with which they set up the company Cayman Ice and Electric. The two were also responsible for the first ice cream shop. The store was first located on Harbour Drive near Hog Sty Bay and later moved to the corner of Cardinall Avenue and Harbour Drive. It was later relocated again to Shedden Road, where Mike's Ice now is. At the shop, the public was also able to enjoy the island's first jukebox, brought back from one of the many Tampa trips.

Hislop married Claire Watler in 1932. Together they had seven children: Rose-Marie, Mary-Lee, Charles Delano, James Lawrence Sheldon, Ella-Kaye, Philip Clayton and René Karl.
