= Jocelyn Hyslop =

Australian social worker (1897–1974)

Jocelyn Sophia Hyslop (1897–1974) was mainly known for her contribution to social work in Australia.

== Education ==
She was a graduate of the London School of Economics (LSE), social science certificate, Diploma in Sociology, Bachelor of Science and a mental health certificate. In addition, she had won a number of awards, including the LSE Loch Exhibition, Commonwealth Fund Child Scholarship and the Metcalfe Scholarship for women.

== Career ==
Her initial career started with her working in the slums of London and Leeds.

=== Australia ===
She arrived in 1934, having been recruited to initiate a formal program of education for social work professionals in Melbourne.

After arriving in Australia, she initially spoke to the Melbourne newspapers about the welfare conditions of society. She was interviewed by the Argus, in which she discussed American and English methods to addressing social welfare. At the time, she was advocating for Australia to follow US methods, unusual as Australia at the time usually followed English methods.

Working at the University of Melbourne, she established a course in social work that was acceptable for the standards of the university. In 1940, the university agreed the course would run. This was the first social work course run in Melbourne, and there was a similar course run in Sydney in the same year. The establishment of the course opened up career paths for university educated women. While there were some women studying at university, most of the careers were dominated by men. Most of the students studying the Social Welfare course were women, unusual for women to be the majority of any university course at the time.

Hyslop had advanced the role of the social worker, which she perceived to help people to find their own path in life. Hylsop was highly critical of 19th century charity workers who she saw had interfered in people's lives, saying they simply dispensed "soup, flannel and groceries " She was generally an advocate for social justice, defending the rights of the unemployed.

=== Rhodesia ===
After her work improving social work in Australia, she left academia, moving to Rhodesia where she joined an Anglican order of nuns.
