= Parkfield, Western Australia =

Parkfield
- Town
- Interactive map of Parkfield
- Coordinates: 33°11′28″S 115°42′53″E
- Country: Australia
- State: Western Australia
- LGA: Shire of Harvey

Government
  - State electorate: Collie-Preston
  - Federal division: Forrest

Population
  - Total: 54 (2021 census)
- Postcode: 6220

Parkfield is a locality in the South West region of Western Australia on the Forrest Highway. Its local government area is the Shire of Harvey. As of the 2021 census, it had a population of 54.

Parkfield was named after the ship of the same name that came to Western Australia in 1841.
