= James Morton Hyslop =

Scottish mathematician and educationalist

James Morton Hyslop FRSE FRSA LLD (1908–1984) was a Scottish mathematician and educationalist primarily linked to South Africa. He founded the Royal College of Nairobi in 1961.

== Life ==
He was born in Dumbarton on 12 September 1908 the son of William Hyslop.

He attended Glasgow High School then Glasgow University where he graduated MA. He then went to Cambridge University where he gained a BA and doctorate (PhD). His dissertation in 1925 was entitled The Theory of Infinite Bilinear Forms and of Linear Integral Equations, his advisor being Ernest William Hobson. he then returned to Glasgow University to lecture in Mathematics. The university granted him a further doctorate (DSc) in 1939.

His career was interrupted by the Second World War during which he served with the RAF in Bomber Command. He was created a Pilot Officer in September 1941.

In 1947 he was elected a Fellow of the Royal Society of Edinburgh. His proposers were Robert Pollock Gillespie, Edward Copson, James Cossar and Arthur Erdelyi.

In 1947 he accepted a professorship at the University of Witwatersrand in South Africa. He continued this role until 1960 when he moved to Nairobi where he transformed the Technical College of Nairobi into a university college, creating the Royal College of Nairobi, and acting as its Principal until 1963. It was later renamed the University of Nairobi. In 1963 he returned to South Africa as Vice Chancellor of Rhodes University in Grahamstown. Glasgow University granted him a third doctorate (LLD) in 1967 and Rhodes granted him a fourth (also LLD) in 1976.

He died in Port Elizabeth in South Africa on 18 May 1984.

== Publications ==
- Infinite Series (1942 plus several later editions)
- Real Variable (1960)

== Family ==
In 1935 he married his wife, Helen Margaret Hyslop.
