= Peter Hislop =

American mathematician

Peter D. Hislop is an American mathematician, formerly the Ralph E. and Norma L. Edwards Research Professor (2010 and 2013) and University Research Professor (2004–2005), at the University of Kentucky, and also a published author.
