= Hoffman, Western Australia =

Hoffman
- Town
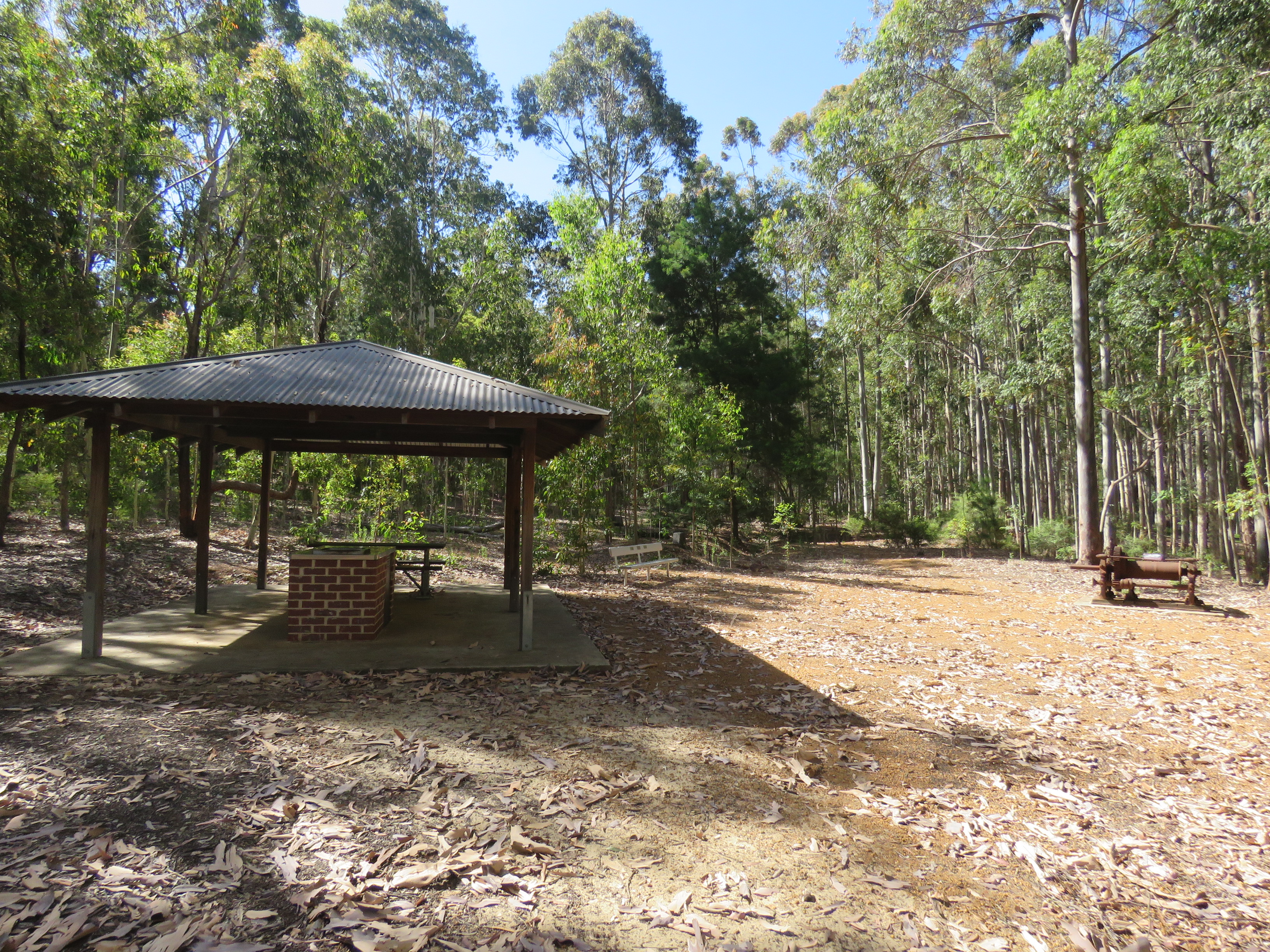
- Facilities at the former Hoffman Mill in December 2020

- Coordinates: 33°0′4.25″S 116°4′50.84″E
- Country: Australia
- State: Western Australia
- LGA: Shire of Harvey

Government
  - State electorate: Collie-Preston
  - Federal division: Forrest

Area
  - Total: 445.1 km^{2} (171.9 sq mi)

Population
  - Total: 31 (2021 census)
  - Density: 0.0696/km^{2} (0.1804/sq mi)
- Postcode: 6220

Hoffman is a locality in the South West region of Western Australia. At the 2021 census, its population was 31.
