= Hector Hyslop =

English cricketer

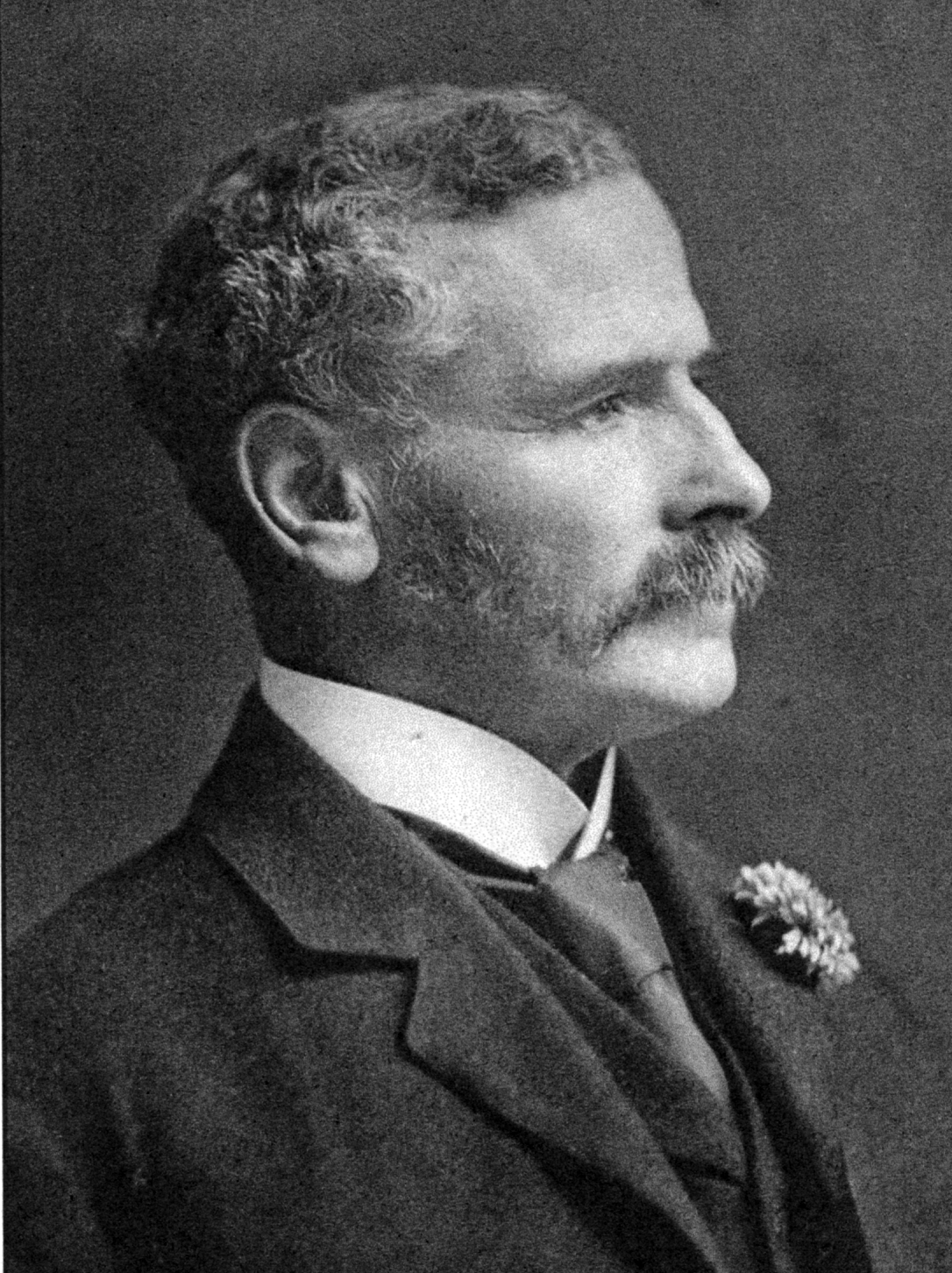

Personal information
- Full name: Hector Henry Hyslop
- Born: 13 December 1840; Southampton, Hampshire, England
- Died: 11 September 1920 (aged 79); Cosham, Hampshire, England
- Batting: Right-handed
- Role: Wicket-keeper

Domestic team information
- Years: Team
- 1876–1877: Hampshire

Career statistics
Competition	First-class
Matches	9
Runs scored	121
Batting average	8.06
100s/50s	0/0
Top score	34
Balls bowled	72
Wickets	2
Bowling average	15.50
5 wickets in innings	0
10 wickets in match	0
Best bowling	2/12
Catches/stumpings	7/11
- Source: Cricinfo, 26 March 2022

Hector Henry "Harry" Hyslop (12 December 1840 – 11 September 1920) was an English cricketer. He was a right-handed batsman who played primarily as a wicket-keeper.

Hyslop made his first-class debut for Hampshire in 1876 against Derbyshire. He played eight first-class matches for Hampshire, his last match coming against Kent in 1877. In 1878 he played in several of the minor matches for the touring Australians. In September 1886 he played a first-class match for the touring Australians against an England XI at Harrogate; his inclusion in the Australia side came from the mistaken belief that Hyslop was born in Australia.

Hyslop worked for 36 years as a local government clerk in Camberwell, London. After several serious illnesses, he died at his home in Cosham, Hampshire, on 11 September 1920, having committed suicide by shooting himself. A bachelor, he left his property of more than 2,000 pounds to "a barmaid, the landlords of several inns, and other friends". One of the beneficiaries was the Australian cricketer Syd Gregory, who received 50 pounds.
