= T. B. Hyslop =

British physician (1863–1933)

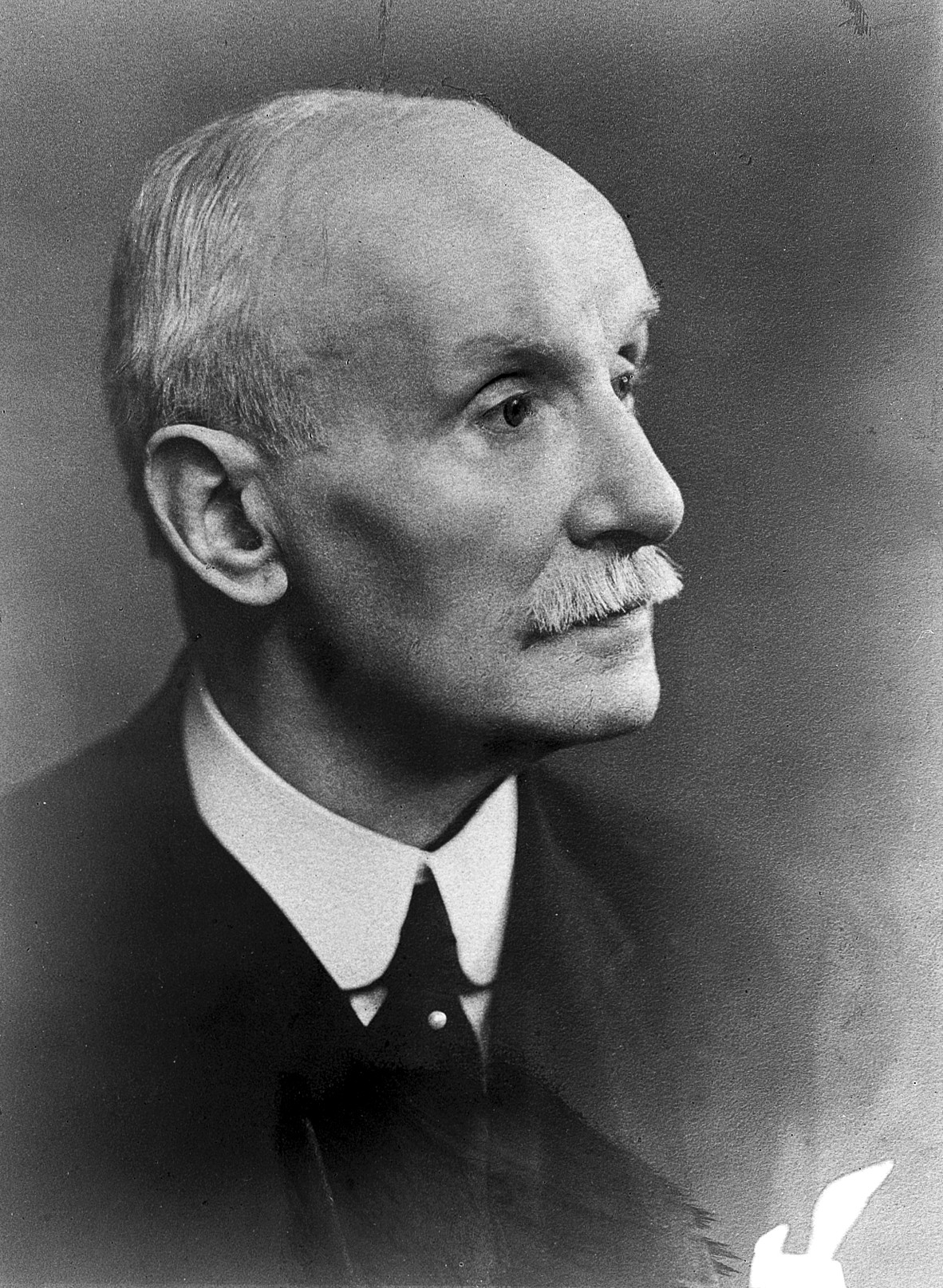
- Born: Theophilus Bulkeley Hyslop; 1863; Kirkhill, Inverness, Scotland
- Died: 12 February 1933 (aged 67–68)
- Education: University of Edinburgh
- Occupation: psychiatrist
- Relatives: James E. Hyslop

Dr Theophilus (Theo) Bulkeley Hyslop FRSE MRCPE (1863-12 February 1933) was a British physician specialising in mental health and overseeing, in various medical capacities, the notorious Bethlem Royal Hospital in London (commonly known as Bedlam) from 1888 to 1911. He was an exponent of eugenics. He was also interested in the use of hypnotism in treating mental illness.

== Life ==
When Hyslop was two his father, William Hyslop, purchased Stretton House, an asylum for men in Church Stretton.

Hyslop underwent medical training graduating from the University of Edinburgh graduating with an MB CM in 1886 before gaining his doctorate (MD). Whilst at university he competed in athletics, coming second in the Scottish pole vault championship in 1884.

In 1888 he joined the Bethlem Royal Hospital, a large asylum in London. He also lectured in psychological medicine at St Marys Hospital in London and at the School of Medicine for Women. He retired in 1911. He was elected a Fellow of the Royal Society of Edinburgh in 1908. His proposers were Sir Arthur Mitchell, James Crichton-Browne, Sir German Sims Woodhead and Sir Thomas Clouston.

Hyslop was famously critical of the art of his contemporary, Roger Fry, stating that it stemmed from insanity. He was Chairman of the Society for the Study of Inebriety and the Chelsea Medical Society. He excelled as an after-dinner speaker and was President of the Omar Khayyam Club. He was a keen athlete, pole jumping, and played cricket, tennis and golf. He composed music, sculpted and painted, exhibiting three times at the Royal Academy.

He developed anxiety attacks which materialised as a tic in the face and shoulders as a result of the Zeppelin raids on London during World War I.

He died on 12 February 1933.

== Publications ==
He made several contributions to Daniel Hack Tuke's Dictionary of Psychological Medicine (1892)

- Laputa (1895)
- Mental Physiology, especially in relation to Mental Disorders (1895)
- Laputa Revisited (1905)
- Post-Illusionism and the Art of the Insane (1911)
- The Borderland: Some of the Problems of Insanity (1924)
- The Great Abnormals (1925)
- Insanity and the Law (BMJ 1926)
