= Gerald Heslop =

English cricketer

Personal information
- Full name: Gerald Gwydyr Heslop
- Born: 17 April 1879; Thames Ditton, Surrey, England
- Died: 28 November 1913 (aged 34); Cringleford, Norfolk, England
- Batting: Unknown

Domestic team information
- Years: Team
- 1895–1901: Norfolk
- 1898: Cambridge University

Career statistics
Competition	First-class
Matches	2
Runs scored	19
Batting average	4.75
100s/50s	–/–
Top score	14
Catches/stumpings	1/–
- Source: Cricinfo, 25 January 2023

Gerald Gwydyr Heslop (17 April 1879 – 28 November 1913) was an English first-class cricketer who played in two matches for Cambridge University in 1898. He was born at Thames Ditton, Surrey and died at Cringleford, Norfolk.

Heslop was educated at Norwich School and at Clare College, Cambridge. A batsman often used as an opener and an occasional bowler, he was picked for Minor Counties matches for Norfolk from the age of 17 in the Minor Counties Championship's inaugural season of 1895, and played for the county through to 1901. At Cambridge University however, he was unsuccessful in the two games for which he was chosen, and faced stiff competition for batting places from players such as Gilbert Jessop and Cuthbert Burnup who would subsequently go on to substantial cricket careers; though he made centuries in college matches, he was not picked again for the university side. Outside university terms, however, he continued to play for Norfolk and in 1900 he was singled out in Wisden Cricketers' Almanack as the team's only consistent batsman, with 407 runs at an average of 31 runs per innings.

Heslop graduated from Cambridge University with a Bachelor of Arts degree in 1901, and the directory of Cambridge alumni records that he was an assistant schoolmaster at Fonthill Preparatory School in East Grinstead, Sussex in 1903. Norfolk dropped out of Minor Counties cricket for two seasons after 1901 and when it resumed in 1904, Heslop was not in the team; he appears, in any case, to have been ill for many years before his death at 34 in 1913.
