= John Hislop =

Australian politician

James John Henry Hislop (1825 – 23 October 1909) was a convict transported to Western Australia. After the expiry of his sentence, he became the first ex-convict in Western Australia to be appointed a teacher.

== Life ==
John Hislop was a clerk in the British Army before being sentenced to seven years transportation for an unknown crime. He arrived in Western Australia on board the Pyrenees in June 1851 and received his ticket of leave on arrival in the colony. In October 1853 he married Bridget Mulqueen, with whom he would have twelve children.

Hislop was officially appointed the government schoolteacher at Bunbury in 1853, but it is said that he was already conducting the school before then. He ran the school for nine years, during which time he taught John and Alexander Forrest. He was considered a poor teacher by the Board of Education, which wrote that the "school had not progressed as satisfactorily as the Board would wish".

In 1862, Hislop was charged with obtaining money by false pretences. He was acquitted, but still dismissed from his teaching post for "improper conduct". He then became the proprietor of the Wellington Hotel, and later a Bunbury municipal councillor.

He died in Bunbury on 23 October 1909.

== See also ==
- Ex-convict school teachers in Western Australia
