= James E. Hyslop =

Scottish businessman and landowner (1861–1931)

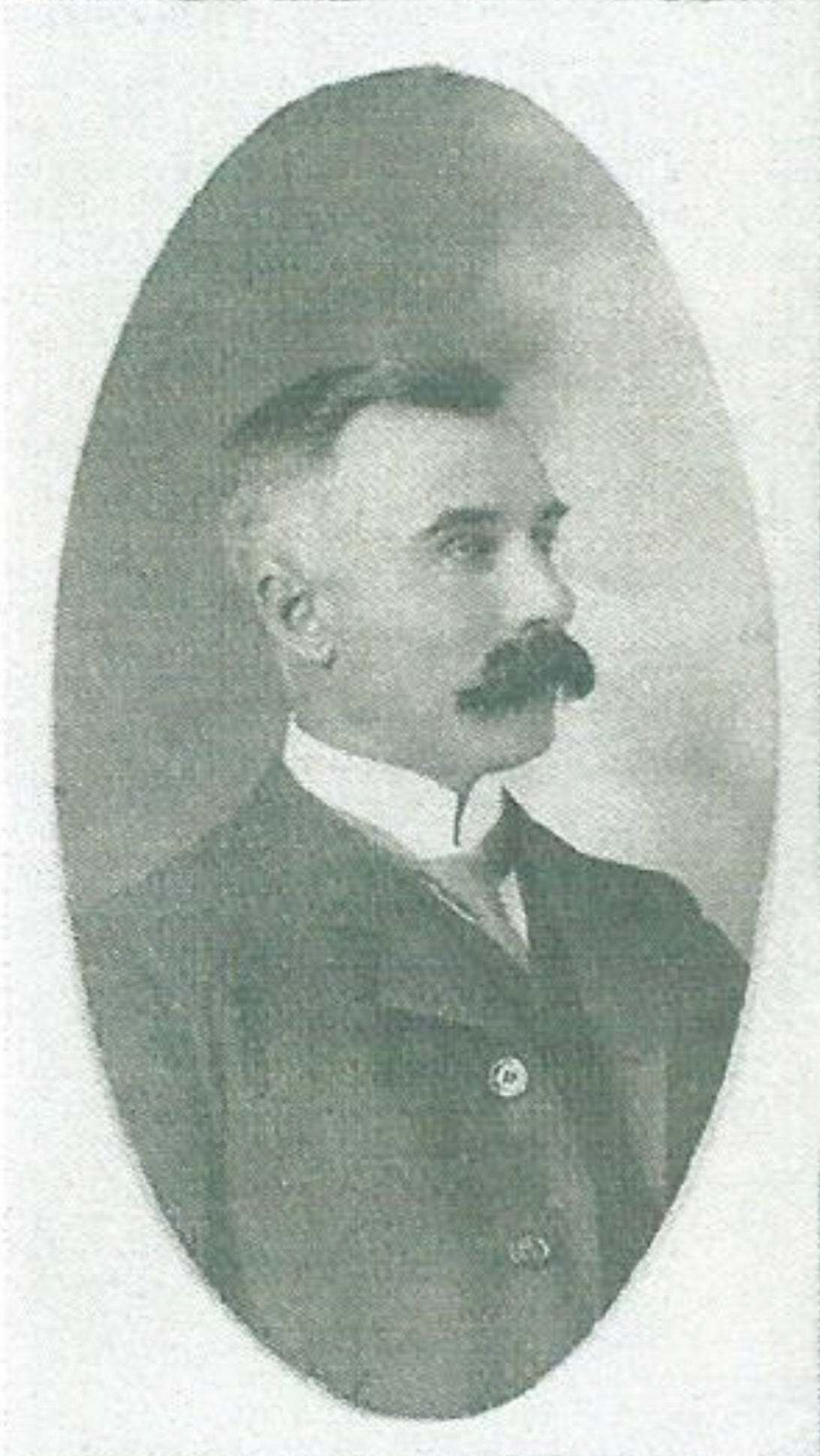
- Born: James Edwin Hyslop; 7 November 1861; Kirkhill, Inverness-shire, Scotland
- Died: 11 January 1928 (aged 66); Hidalgo del Parral, Chihuahua, Mexico
- Education: Oxford University
- Occupation: Businessman
- Spouse: Maria Hyslop (née Beckmann)
- Children: 7
- Relatives: T. B. Hyslop (brother)

James Edwin Hyslop (7 November 1861 – 11 January 1928) was a Scottish businessman and landowner, who settled in the Mexican state of Chihuahua, and founder of several mining companies.

== Childhood ==
James Hyslop was born in Kirkhill, Inverness-shire, Scotland on 7 November 1861, son of William Hyslop and Margaret Gowenlock. Hyslop hailed from a Scottish family involved in diverse industries, including mining, agriculture, livestock, and psychiatric hospitals.

Hyslop lived the first years of his childhood in the city of Inverness, Scotland and later in his youth, his family would settle permanently in Church Stretton, England, where he lived along his 7 siblings. At 19, driven by an interest in his family's mining business, he pursued Mining Engineering at Oxford University, earning a First Class Hons degree.

== Migration and companies ==
He arrived in Mexico in 1895, to Parral, Chihuahua, as co-owner and general manager of "San Francisco del Oro Mines, Ltd", a London based mining firm that had 20 mines in Mexico and 7 mines abroad. Different minerals such as gold, silver, copper and zinc were extracted in these mines. This mining company was founded by James Hyslop and other English aristocrats, including Rudolph Feilding, 9th Earl of Denbigh. Also, in the year 1900, Hyslop founded, together with the British, William Harrison, the mining company "The Guggenheim Smelting Co." Company that operated in the state of Chihuahua, which had 5 mines, where silver and zinc were mainly extracted.

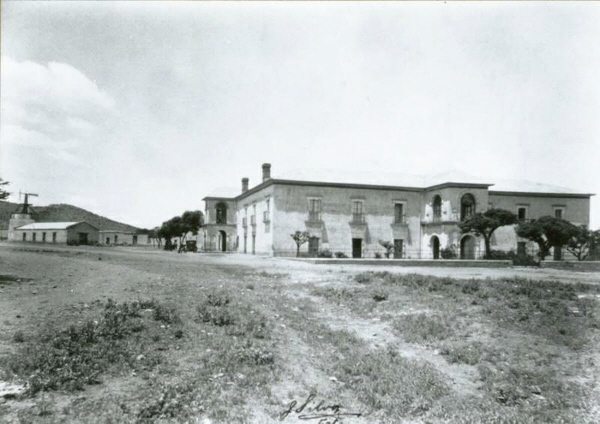
Hacienda de Santiago

He inherited from his father-in-law the "Hacienda De Santiago", a famous hacienda built in the Spanish Viceroyalty, where agricultural, livestock and textile activities were practiced. It was established as the official residence of the family.

Hyslop saw the great business opportunity that Hacienda represented in Mexico at the time, by which he acquired estates across different states in the country. Very diverse activities were performed at the different "Haciendas", including textile production, wood production, agricultural production, dairies, vineyards, brickyards and livestock handling.

By 1910, James Hyslop had become a prominent figure in Mexican business during the Porfiriato period, making investments across diverse sectors, including mining, oil, rail transport, livestock, and agriculture. He also acquired extensive tracts of land in both Mexico and the United States.

== Family ==
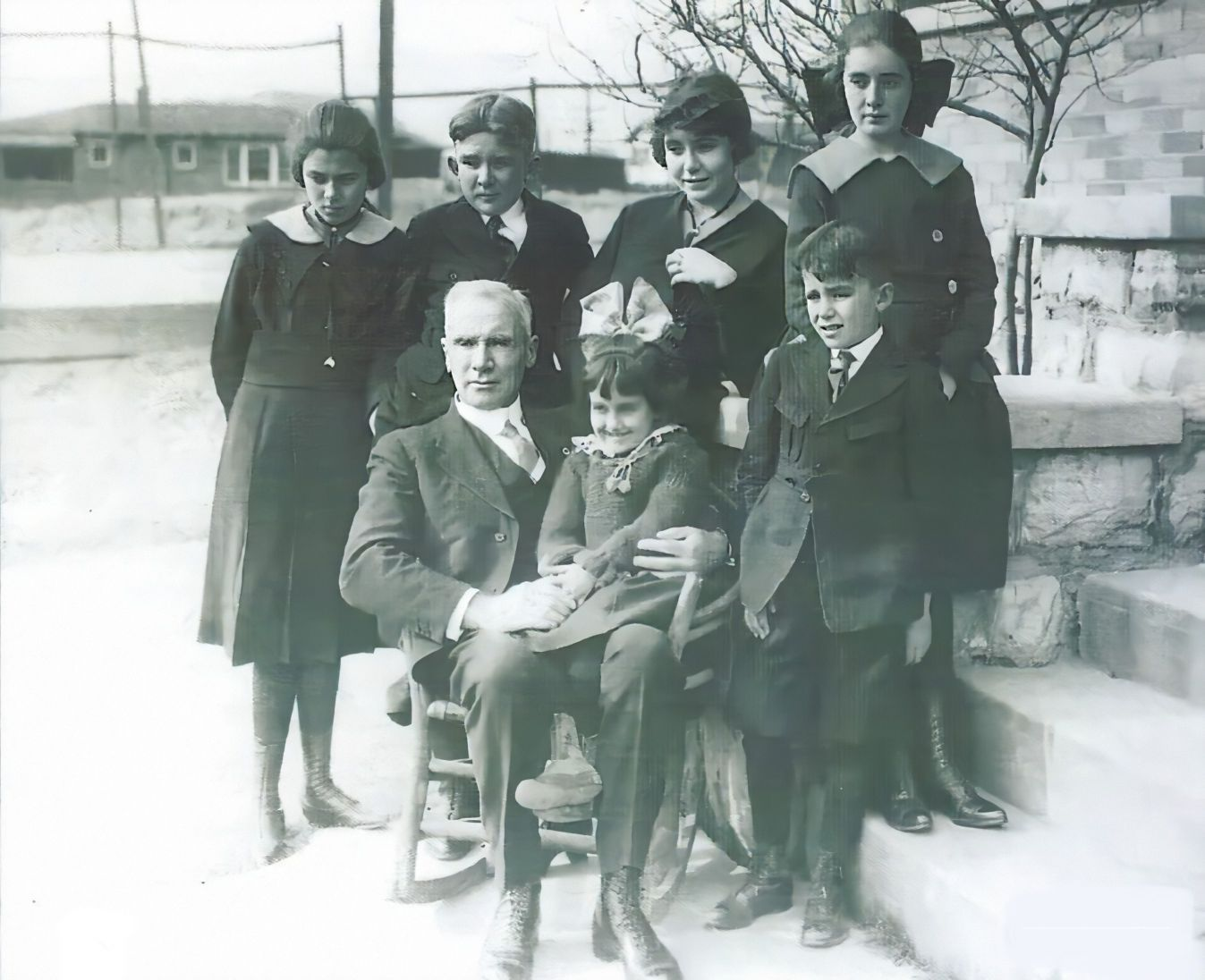
Hyslop family during the early 1900s

In 1903, Hyslop married Maria Beckmann, daughter of the German William Christian Beckmann, another prominent miner with land extensions in the district of Parral, Chihuahua. James and Maria had seven children, Margaret, William, Mary, Letitia, James, Beatrice and Henry.

== Death ==
On 11 January 1928, Hyslop suffered a heart attack due to a condition he had been suffering for several years.
