= Rica Erickson =

Western Australian writer (1908–2009)

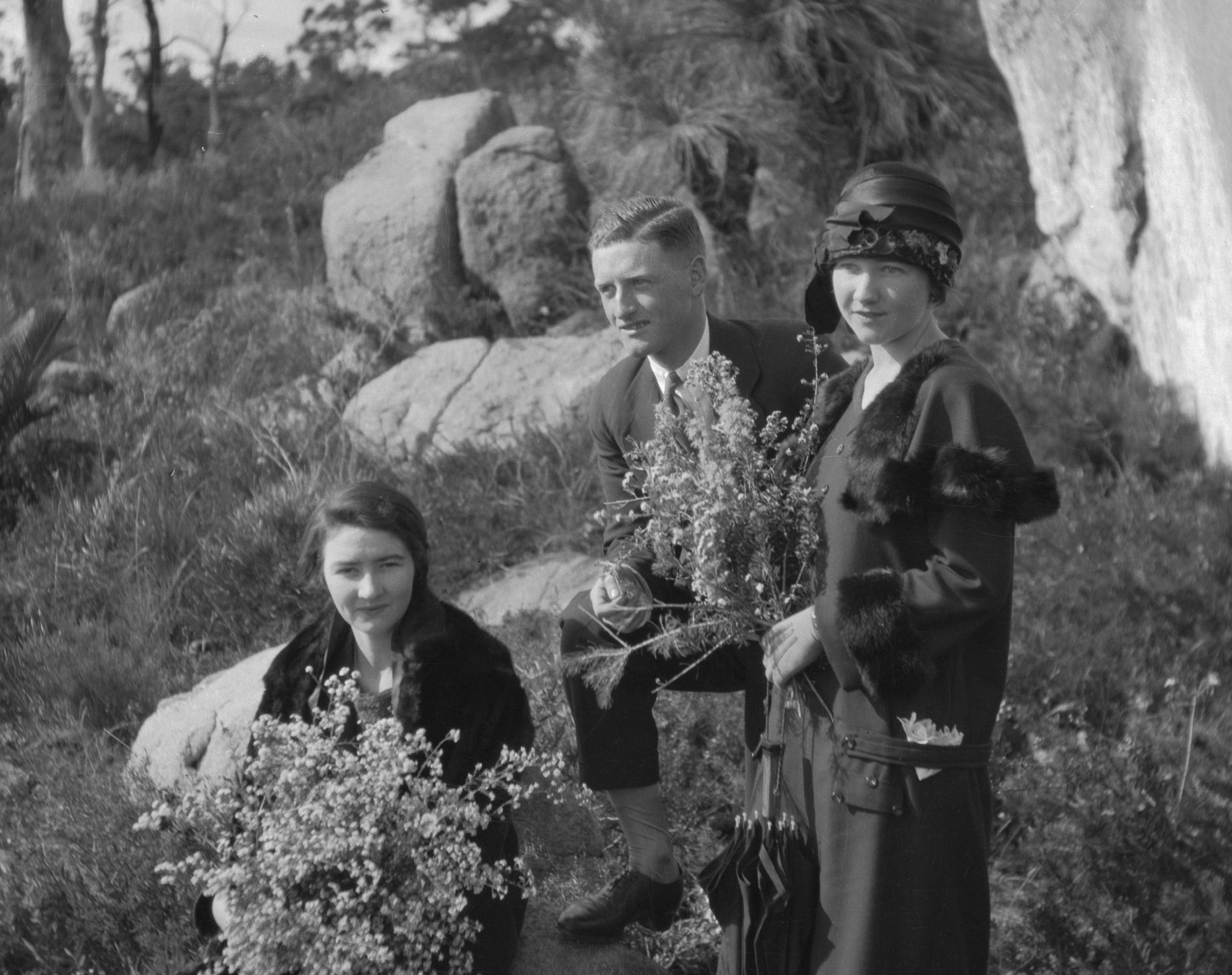
- Erickson (left) in 1924
- Born: Frederica Lucy Sandilands; 10 August 1908; Boulder, Western Australia
- Died: 8 September 2009 (aged 101); Mosman Park, Western Australia
- Occupations: Naturalist; botanical artist; historian; author

Frederica Lucy "Rica" Erickson AM, née Sandilands, (10 August 1908 – 8 September 2009) was an Australian naturalist, botanical artist, historian, author and teacher. Without any formal scientific training, she wrote extensively on botany and birds, as well as genealogy and general history. Erickson authored ten books, co-authored four, was editor of twelve, and author or co-author of numerous papers and articles that have been printed in popular, scientific and encyclopaedic publications.

== Biography ==
Born in Boulder, Western Australia, Erickson was the eldest of eight children of Phoebe Cooke and Christopher Sandilands, both of whom immigrated to Western Australia from Victoria in 1906, and met in the goldfield town. Christopher Sandilands was a farmer's son and worked at the Great Boulder Mine as a filter press hand. The family lived on Dwyer Street.

Christopher enlisted into the army and served in France during World War I. He returned home disabled and was unable to resume his work at the mine, consequently purchasing a block of virgin bush at Kendenup to begin farming as an orchardist. It was here that Rica met botanical artist Emily Pelloe in 1921. Pelloe was introduced after Jack De Garis, the publisher of Pelloe's books, gave the Sandilands family a gift of her just published Wildflowers of Western Australia as a Christmas present. She returned to the goldfields to attend Eastern Goldfields High School, staying with her grandmother for five years. While living in Boulder she joined Girl Guides Australia where she developed an interest in birds and flowering plants. Choosing a career of teaching she was appointed as monitor teacher at her family town of Kendenup in 1924. After Kendenup, she was transferred to Mount Barker, Dumbleyung and Gnowangerup and in 1927 went to Perth and entered Claremont Teachers College for the required one year of training to become a country teacher. While there she met Dom Serventy and joined the Western Australian Naturalists' Club.

By 1931 she was teaching at isolated one-teacher schools such as Aurora between Cranbrook and Kojonup, and later at Youngs Siding near Wilson Inlet, and Denmark. The countryside on the southern coast piqued an interest in orchids and coincided with the publication of her friend Emily Pelloe's second book, West Australian Orchids. Eminent orchidologists Edith Coleman and Dr. Richard Sanders Rogers were quoted extensively in Pelloe's book, and Erickson established contact, sending them sketches and pressings of orchids found in her region. Wilson Inlet was the site of many specimens painted in 1881 by Robert D. FitzGerald, who published the important work Australian Orchids. In Christmas 1931 she holidayed in Victoria and met Coleman and Rogers who encouraged her further study. Knowing she would be returning to a school posting near Wilson Inlet, Rogers instructed her on the finer details of painting the plants using pen and ink instead of pencil as she did previously.

After several years teaching on the southern coast of Western Australia, Erickson requested and received a transfer to the school at Bolgart north of Toodyay in 1934. It was here that she regularly passed by Hawthornden, (Note: Hawthornden is located at 31°30′46.7″S 116°27′27.3″E.) the historic house of pioneer settler, botanist and naturalist James Drummond. Later she would write a detailed family history of the Drummond family, in The Drummonds of Hawthornden, as well as histories of the surrounding districts in The Victoria Plains and Old Toodyay and Newcastle. Another interest that she followed in Bolgart was bees and wasps, which she studied with the apiologist Tarlton Rayment.

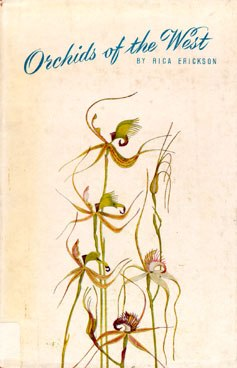
Cover of Orchids of the West (1951), Erickson's first book

In Bolgart she met share-farmer and future husband Sydney "Syd" Uden Erickson (1908–1987) and they were married in Fremantle in June 1936. The couple bought land at Bolgart in 1938, which they cleared and named Fairlea. They raised four children: Dorothy (born 1939), John (1940), Bethel (1942), and Robin (1943); the next few years were devoted largely to raising the children and establishing the farm. However Erickson maintained her interest in natural history and in 1951 published her first book, the self-illustrated Orchids of the West. This was followed by Triggerplants in 1958.

The state botanist Charles Gardner ran a wildflower tour in 1957 for the Midland Railway Road Service. The following year Erickson was invited to lead the tour, taking the opportunity for a paid holiday. In later years she led other groups of tourists on nature based tours in the south and north of the state.

In 1965 the couple travelled to Europe for a holiday where Rica spent some time studying Drummond's plant specimens at the Kew Gardens herbarium in London, which were sent from Western Australia in the mid-19th century. On their return, they retired from farm life and settled in the Perth suburb of Nedlands, where Erickson wrote several more books. She became a member of the Royal Western Australian Historical Society and her writing during this period focussed on the early days of the state's European settlement, and its convict era. She wrote a history of the society called Forty Years of the Royal Western Australian Historical Society: 1936–1976 which was published in Early Days. Assisted by a group of volunteers, she compiled the first three volumes of the Dictionary of Western Australians in time for Western Australia's sesquicentennial year of 1979.

In 1973 Flowers and Plants of Western Australia was first published. This book on Western Australian wildflowers and designed for popular use contained over 500 colour photographs and was the combined effort of Erickson as chairman and coordinator, Alex George and Neville Marchant as botanists, and Michael Morcombe as the photographer.

Syd died in 1987. Rica died on 8 September 2009 at Mosman Park.

== Nature reserve ==
In 1964, the Bolgart Branch of the Country Women's Association petitioned the Victoria Plains Shire Council for the protection of 124 hectares (310 acres) of remaining forest along the Old Plains Road, about 15 kilometres (9.3 mi) south-west of Calingiri, an important track through the bush which was blazed by Drummond in 1842. The reserve is located at 31°8′39″S 116°17′39″E.

The request was granted, and in 1996, following another request from the Association, the Department of Conservation and Land Management named Reserve 27595 the Rica Erickson Nature Reserve. Naming the reserve after a living person was an unusual step for the department's naming committee. Over three hundred people attended the official opening on 11 August 1996.

== Awards and recognition ==
In 1980 she was awarded an honorary degree of doctor of letters from the University of Western Australia for her research and work in the field of botany. In the same year she was named Western Australian Citizen of the Year in the category of the Arts, Culture and Entertainment, and in 1987 was made a Member of the Order of Australia, "in recognition of service to the arts, particularly as an author and illustrator". Her botanical illustrations have been exhibited at the Art Gallery of Western Australia and Perth's Alexander Library.

In May 2007 she was awarded the Heritage Council of Western Australia individual award for her lifelong contribution to heritage in Western Australia.

Noted botanist Alex George with whom she co-wrote Flowers and Plants of Western Australia in 1973, wrote: "Rica Erickson has been one of the foremost amateur natural historians in Western Australia in the 20th Century."

Ronda Jamieson, Director of the J S Battye Library in Western Australia said "Rica Erickson is one of Western Australia's treasures". The State Library houses the Rica Erickson collection, a repository which includes manuscripts of her publications, background papers relating to the genealogical dictionaries, all of her published works, field journals, and 500 of her botanical art works. A website maintained by the library has been created as a tribute to her.

In 2004, Stephen Hopper and Andrew P. Brown named an orchid genus Ericksonella in her honour.

== Works ==
The J S Battye Library holds some of her works.

Botany

- Erickson, Rica (1978) [1951]. Orchids of the West. Paterson Brokensha. ISBN 0855640987.
- Erickson, Rica (1958). Triggerplants. Paterson Brokensha (published 1981). ISBN 0855641002.
- Erickson, Rica; Erickson, Rica (1975). Plants of prey in Australia. University of Western Australia Press. ISBN 978-0-85564-099-6.

Historical

- Erickson, Rica (1969). The Drummonds of Hawthornden. Lamb Paterson, Osborne Park.
- Erickson, Rica (1971). The Victoria Plains. Lamb Paterson, Osborne Park.
- Erickson, Rica (1974). Old Toodyay and Newcastle.
- Erickson, Rica (1978). The Dempsters.
- Erickson, Rica, ed. (1983). The Brand on his Coat: Biographies of some Western Australian Convicts. Nedlands: UWA Publishing. ISBN 0-85564-223-8. LCCN 84145691. OCLC 12051617. OL 2914148M. Wikidata Q133820754.
- Erickson, Rica (1992). The Bride Ships.
- Erickson, Rica (1997). The Misfortunes of Phoebe. Hesperian Press.

Contributions to natural and general history books

- Erickson was the head compiler of the Dictionary of Western Australians in its many volumes.
- Erickson, Rica (1964). Sentinel Duties Among Cockatoos, in Land of Wonder—The Best Australian Nature Writing. Angus and Robertson, Sydney.
- Erickson, Rica. Young's Siding, in They Tell Their Own tales—The Vanishing One-Teacher Schools. Privately published.
- Erickson, Rica (1991). Sharing a Wonderful Dream. LISWA.
- Erickson, R., George, A.S., Marchant, N.G. (1973). Flowers and Plants of Western Australia.
- Erickson, R. (1974). Jane Adams of Mangowine in Early Days Journal, Vol. VII, Part VI.

Papers and articles

- Articles in The West Australian regarding natural history in the 1950s.
- Springtime in the Stirlings – The West Australian 17 November 1951 p. 11 – Climbing Mondurup at the west end of the Range.
- Australian Orchid Review
- Australian Plants
- Bird Study for Bird Lovers
- The Emu: Official Organ of the Royal Australasian Ornithologists Union
- Flowers & plants of Western Australia (with AS George AS, NG Marchant and MK Morcombe )(1986) (Reed, Sydney).
- The Perth Mint Wildflower Chart
- The Victorian Naturalist
- The Western Australian Naturalist
- Western Wildlife
- Wild Life
- Wildlife and Outdoors
- Wildlife in Australia
