= UWA Publishing =

University publisher in Western Australia

- Parent company: University of Western Australia
- Founded: 1935
- Country of origin: Australia
- Headquarters location: Perth, Western Australia
- Distribution: NewSouth Books (Australia); International Specialized Book Services (USA); Roundhouse Group (UK)
- Publication types: Books
- Official website: uwap.uwa.edu.au

UWA Publishing, formerly known as the Text Books Board and then University of Western Australia Press, is a Western Australian publisher established in 1935 by the University of Western Australia. It produces a range of non-fiction and fiction titles.

== Background and establishment ==
Australia's first scholarly publisher was Melbourne University Press, established in 1922. The University of Queensland proposed an Australia-wide university press at the 1932 Universities Conference, but the Melbourne press did not support this idea. University students' ongoing difficulties with obtaining textbooks were common at the time, and the Australian universities had different ways of addressing the issue. During the 1920s, the University of Western Australia (UWA) appointed several booksellers, who each reported that selling textbooks was not commercially viable due to low student numbers (in 1935, UWA had 787 students, compared to 3,497 at Melbourne and 1,090 at Queensland).

UWA's vice-chancellor, Hubert Whitfeld, believed that "Australian universities ought to publish very much more than they do", and established the Text Books Board in 1935 with support from academics Walter Murdoch and Fred Alexander. It was known as the Text Books Board until 1948, when it took on the name University of Western Australia Press.

== Late 20th century ==
Scholarly publishing at the UWA Press continually struggled to be commercially viable. The market was small and the press was isolated from other cities and markets. Subsidised journals were published during the 1960s for UWA's departments, which were time-consuming for press staff and despite the subsidies, rarely met their costs. Production of the journals ended in 1973. During the 1970s, textbooks were replaced with "recommended readings", and students no longer needed to purchase textbooks.

During the 1980s, advances in printing processes reduced the cost of printing books, but the rising popularity of photocopiers saw lecturers create course readers to save students time and money. Course readers contain photocopies of journal articles, book chapters and monographs, specific to a particular course or topic. Several university presses in Australia closed during the 1980s, and the UWA Press's grant and staff levels were reduced.

== 2000s ==
The press combined with the Western Australian History Foundation in 2000 to offer the WA History Foundation Award, which encourages and publishes works on Western Australian history. The first work published was Blood Sweat and Welfare: A History of White Bosses and Aboriginal Pastoral Workers by Mary Anne Jebb. In 2000, it started publishing a quarterly newsletter, which includes new books.

In 2001, the press selected the Eurospan Group to promote and distribute their books in the United Kingdom, Europe and the Middle East. In 2004, it ran a series of articles on the members of the board.

The organisation celebrated its 70th anniversary in 2005, and gave an opportunity to post-graduate students to have their manuscripts published. The press approached Australian university coordinators in creative writing courses for recommendations of the work of post-graduate students in PhDs and master's degrees.

The publishing house changed its name to UWA Publishing in 2009.

== Dorothy Hewett Award ==
In 2015 it established the Dorothy Hewett Award (in honour of the writer Dorothy Hewett) for an unpublished completed manuscript of fiction, narrative non-fiction or poetry. The Dorothy Hewett Award is supported by the Copyright Agency Cultural Fund.

Josephine Wilson won the inaugural award for her second novel, Extinctions, which went on to win the Miles Franklin Award. Odette Kelada then won the award in 2016 for her novel Drawing Sybylla.

In 2017, UWA Publishing chose to align the award with the year of announcement. In February 2018 Julie Watts won the award for the poetry collection Legacy.

In May 2018 it was announced that the Dorothy Hewett Award would become a national award allowing submissions from writers across Australia rather than only Western Australia.

In 2021, two authors were announced as co-winners of the award. Josh Kemp won for his manuscript Strangest Places which was published in 2022 as Banjawarnand went on to win the 2022 Ned Kelly Award for Best Debut Crime Fiction and the 2023 Western Australian Premier's Book Award for an Emerging Writer. Kgshak Akec won for her manuscript Hopeless Kingdom which was published in 2022 and went on to be shortlisted for the 2023 Miles Franklin Award.

Winners of the Dorothy Hewett Award
Year	Name	Work	Reference
2015	Josephine Wilson	Extinctions	
2016	Odette Kelada	Drawing Sybylla	
2017	—		
2018	Julie Watts	Legacy	
2019	Angela Rockel	Rogue Intensities	
2020	Karen Wyld	Where the Fruit Falls	
2021	Josh Kemp	Strangest Places	
2021	Kgshak Akec	Hopeless Kingdom	
2022	Brendan Ritchie	Eta Draconis	
2023	Kirsty Iltners	Depth of Field	
2024	Kaya Ortiz	Past and Parallel Lives	
2025	Mohammed Massoud Morsi	The Hair of the Pigeon	

== Potential closure and new status ==
In November 2019 the University of Western Australia announced its plans to close UWA Publishing.

However, this decision was forgone in favour of UWA Publishing operating under a hybrid publishing model with internal management re-aligned to the University Library.

Since 2020 UWA Publishing has continued to publish literary works and will celebrate its 90th anniversary in 2025.

== See also ==
- Melbourne University Publishing
- Sesquicentenary Celebrations Series
