= Jubilee Building =

Heritage listed building in Perth, Western Australia

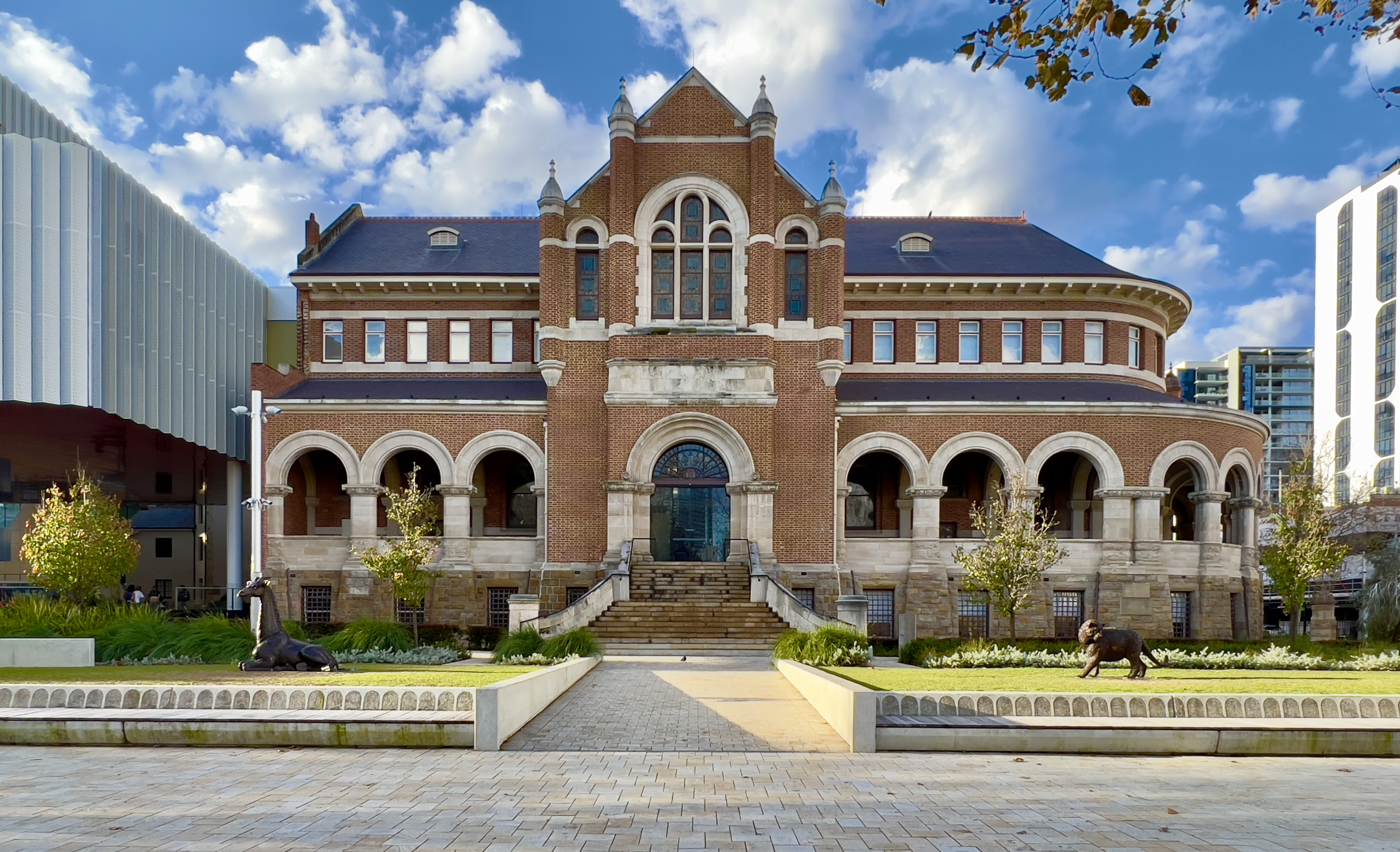
- The Jubilee Building in 2023

General information
- Type: Heritage listed building
- Location: Perth, Western Australia
- Coordinates: 31.9498°S 115.8619°E

Western Australia Heritage Register
- Type: State Registered Place
- Designated: 28 August 2001
- Part of: Art Gallery & Museum Buildings
- Reference no.: 1962

The Jubilee Building is part of the Western Australian Museum in Perth, Western Australia. Designed in the Victorian Byzantine style by George Temple-Poole and supervised by his 1895 successor John Harry Grainger, it was opened in 1899.

The building was originally planned as a combined library, museum and art gallery to be sited in St Georges Terrace to commemorate the Golden Jubilee of Queen Victoria in 1887. However, by 1894, enthusiasm for the project had waned and the St Georges Terrace site had been abandoned. After several years, a site was selected near the corner of James Street and Beaufort Street to adjoin several other buildings including the old Perth Gaol which was being used for museum displays and storage. It was still termed the Victoria Public Library when it was being built in 1897. The Hackett Hall that housed the Public Library is immediately west of the building.

Construction started in 1897. The museum moved into the basement prior to the building's completion in 1899.

It has been included in the redevelopment of the Western Australian Museum, as part of the Perth Cultural Centre. The entire building has been refurbished, with the terrace and grand entrance reopened.
