= Sandy skate =

Sandy skate may refer to either of these fish species:

- Leucoraja circularis, found in the northeast Atlantic and Mediterranean
- Pavoraja arenaria, found off the western coast of Australia
