= P. arenaria =

P. arenaria may refer to:

- Pavoraja arenaria, the sandy skate, a fish species found out the coast of western Australia
- Potentilla arenaria, a plant species

== See also ==
- Arenaria (disambiguation)
