= P. nitida =

P. nitida may refer to:

- Passiflora nitida, the bell apple, a passion fruit species in Costa Rica, French Guiana and Brazil
- Pavoraja nitida, the peacock skate, a fish species
- Picralima nitida, the akuamma, a tree species found in West Africa

== See also ==
- Nitida (disambiguation)
