= Perth Gaol =

Former prison building in Perth Western Australia,

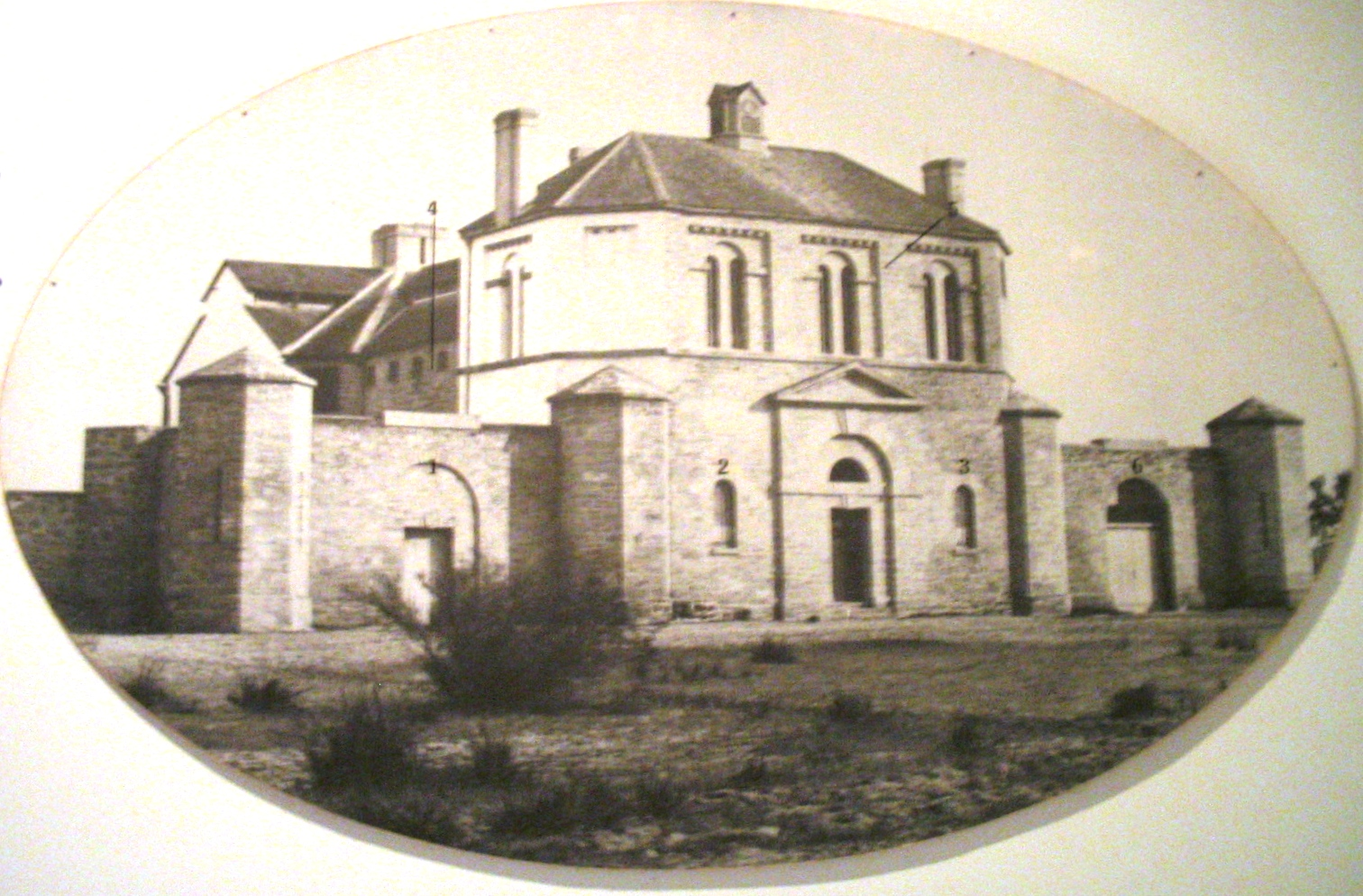
- Perth Gaol in about 1865 with exterior yards and walls visible

General information
- Type: Heritage listed building
- Location: Perth, Western Australia
- Coordinates: 31°56′59″S 115°51′43″E

Western Australia Heritage Register
- Type: State Registered Place
- Designated: 16 October 1992
- Part of: Art Gallery & Museum Buildings (1962)
- Reference no.: 1965

The Perth Gaol (often referred to as the Old Perth Gaol) was a gaol built in Perth, a suburb of Perth, the state capital of Western Australia, between 1854 and 1856 to house convicts and other prisoners. It is located just west of Beaufort Street.

It operated until March 1888 when the last prisoner was transferred to Fremantle Prison. The main gaol building, minus the yards, stands today adjacent to the Western Australian Museum in Perth.

== History ==
Prior to the construction of the Perth Gaol, the Swan River Colony had only the Round House in Fremantle, the partially completed Fremantle Prison (construction began in 1851 and completed in 1859) and a six-cell lock-up which had been built in about 1830 opposite Government House in Perth. With the growth of the city it was deemed that the latter was an inappropriate location for a gaol and it was demolished in 1855 (the site now occupied by the Deanery). A new site was selected by the Colonial Secretary, Charles Piesse and the Surveyor-General, John Septimus Roe and reserved on a rise on what is now near the intersection of Beaufort and Francis Streets.

With the expanding population and with the importation of convicts in 1850 to provide a labour force for public works, there was a need for a facility to house inmates near the city. A proposal was submitted to Governor Charles Fitzgerald in December 1853 for such a facility comprising two floors with a basement. The project was approved but construction took longer than expected and substantial modifications to the original design were made while work progressed. The final building comprised a cruciform layout with cells, a chapel, gaolers' quarters and prisoners' yards.

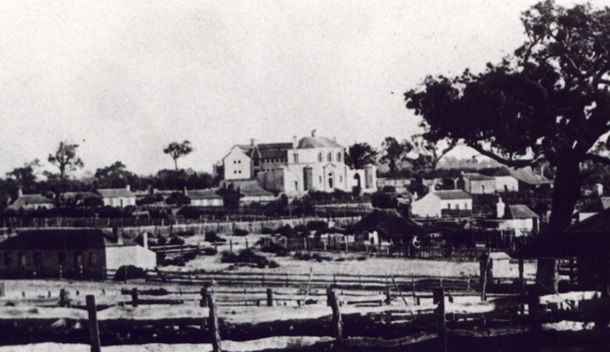
Perth Gaol in the 1860s, viewed from about the corner of and Murray streets

The design was by architect Richard Roach Jewell, the city Chief of Works who had only recently arrived in the colony and who went on to also design a number of other public buildings in the city, including the Barracks Arch and the Perth Town Hall. The gaol was built using sub-contract labour with stone provided by convict labour. The stone was cut from limestone cliffs in Rocky Bay near Fremantle and floated up the Swan River on barges. The first stage cost £2220/15/10, equivalent to A$342,319.52 in 2022.

While construction was underway, the Enquirer newspaper appealed for provision of facilities for hangings at the gaol.

On Wednesday last the execution of Samuel Stanley and the aboriginal native Jacob took place a little distance from the Perth Causeway, ... While on this subject we cannot help expressing a hope that a portion of the new Perth Gaol may be appropriated to a fitting place of execution. If such an arrangement were carried out, such spectacles we have here recorded would soon cease.

The first execution took place in 1855 in an execution yard on the south side of the site. After complaints, the sides of the gallows were enclosed to hide the executions from public gaze. The gallows remained until the gaol ceased operating in 1888.

Colonial prisoners were mainly housed in the gaol from its opening, but in 1858, control transferred to the Imperial Convict Establishment which managed the convicts, and the colonial prisoners were transferred to Fremantle Prison. Transportation of convicts ended in 1868 and in 1875 the gaol was handed back to the colonial government. In 1886 it was reported that the gaol was overcrowded with 128 prisoners and at times the inmate population had reached 150. Later that year the Convict Establishment was disbanded, leading to the imminent demise of the gaol. The last prisoner was transferred to Fremantle in about 1888 and it ceased being used as a gaol from that date.

It was used briefly as the Perth courthouse before that returned to Stirling Gardens, and for a few years it had occasional use by the police and other government departments.

== Executions ==
Name	Date of execution	Crime	Notes
James Fannin	14 April 1871	Rape	Fannin was the last man hanged for rape in Western Australia and his execution was the first "private" one in the Swan River Colony
Margaret Cody and William Davis	15 July 1871	Murder	
Briley (or Briarly)	13 October 1871	Murder	
Noorbung (or Noorabung)	13 October 1871	Murder	
Charcoal and Tommy	15 February 1872	Murder	
Garadie and Muregelly	16 October 1873	Murder	
Robert Goswell	13 January 1874	Murder	
John Gill	4 April 1874	Murder	
Bobbinett	22 April 1875	Murder	
Wanaba (or Wallaby) and Wandagary (or Waldigerry)	22 April 1875	Murder	
Kenneth Brown	10 June 1876	Murder	
Yarndu	16 October 1876	Murder	
Chilagorah (or Chingarrah, alias Charley)	29 April 1879	Murder	
Ah Kett	27 January 1883	Murder	
John Collins	27 January 1883	Murder	
John Maroney and William Watkins (alias Mathuis or Mathews)	25 October 1883	Murder	
Henry Benjamin Haynes	23 January 1884	Murder	
Thomas Henry Carbury (or Carberry)	23 October 1884	Murder	
John Duffy	28 January 1885	Murder	
Henry Sherry	27 October 1885	Murder	
Franz Erdmann (alias Frank Hornig)	4 April 1887	Murder	
William Conroy	18 November 1887	Murder	Conroy was the last person executed at the Perth Gaol

== Perth Museum ==
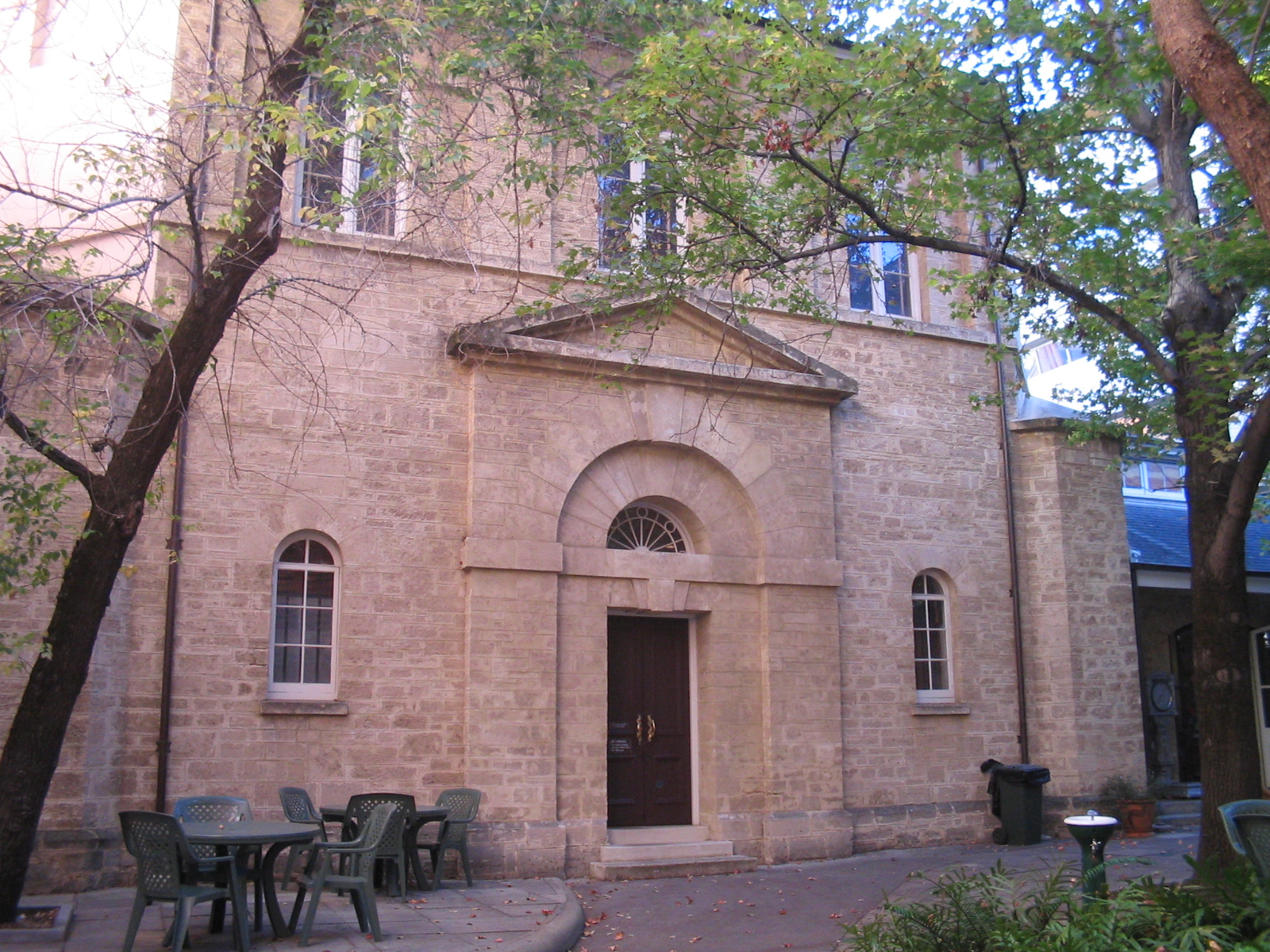
Entrance

In 1891 the building was renamed to the Geological Museum and used to store Reverend Charles Nicolay's geological collection. In 1892 the building was renamed as the Perth Museum, storing the Swan River Mechanics' Institute museum collection as well as a collection of Aboriginal artifacts from the Police Department. At about the same time, the building was substantially modified with the roof lowered and the entire central cell block removed. A northern wing was built in 1895.

Construction of the adjacent Jubilee Building commenced in 1897 and finished in 1899, which gave a new home to the museum, with the gaol continuing to be used until the present day as a museum annex for displays and storage.

From 1968 until about 1976, major renovations of the gaol were undertaken including raising the roof to its original height and alignment. As few original plans were available, it was not attempted to return the building to its exact original configuration, however the exterior is now substantially restored. Fire doors were fitted with improved ground floor and first floor access for visitors.

The building is now a part of the Perth Cultural Centre, which includes the Western Australian Museum, the Art Gallery, the J S Battye Library and the State Library of Western Australia.

== See also ==
- Comptroller General of Convicts (Western Australia)
