= Pavoraja alleni =

Scientific classification
- Kingdom: Animalia
- Phylum: Chordata
- Class: Chondrichthyes
- Subclass: Elasmobranchii
- Order: Rajiformes
- Family: Arhynchobatidae
- Genus: Pavoraja
- Species: P. alleni

Binomial name
- Pavoraja alleni McEachran & Fechhelm, 1982

Species of fish

Pavoraja alleni, or Allen's skate, is a species of fish in the family Arhynchobatidae. It is bathydemersal and lives on soft bottoms of the continental shelf in depths from 304 to 458 metres (997 to 1,503 ft). It is native to Australia. Its maximum length is 35 centimetres (14 in). It lays egg capsules which have horn-like protections in each corner. As typical of rays, it does not guard its eggs.

== Etymology ==
The fish is named in honor of ichthyologist Gerald R. Allen (b. 1942) of the Western Australia Museum (Perth), who furnished the authors with the specimens.

== Sources ==
- Froese, Rainer; Pauly, Daniel (eds.). "Pavoraja alleni". FishBase. November 2008 version.
