= Liparetrus glauerti =

Scientific classification
- Kingdom: Animalia
- Phylum: Arthropoda
- Clade: Pancrustacea
- Class: Insecta
- Order: Coleoptera
- Suborder: Polyphaga
- Infraorder: Scarabaeiformia
- Family: Scarabaeidae
- Genus: Liparetrus
- Species: L. glauerti

Binomial name
- Liparetrus glauerti Britton, 1980

Species of beetle

Liparetrus glauerti is a species of beetle of the family Scarabaeidae. It is found in Australia (Western Australia).

== Taxonomy ==
This species belongs to the rufipennis species group. The defining characters of this group include the absence of setae and scales on the disc of the pronotum.

== Description ==
Adults reach a length of about 10 mm (0.39 in). The pronotum is black anteriorly and dark reddish behind, while the elytra are bright reddish brown with pale yellow apical margins. The abdomen is reddish brown and the ventral thorax is brown.

== Etymology ==
The species is named after Mr. L. Glauert, former Director of the Western Australian Museum.
