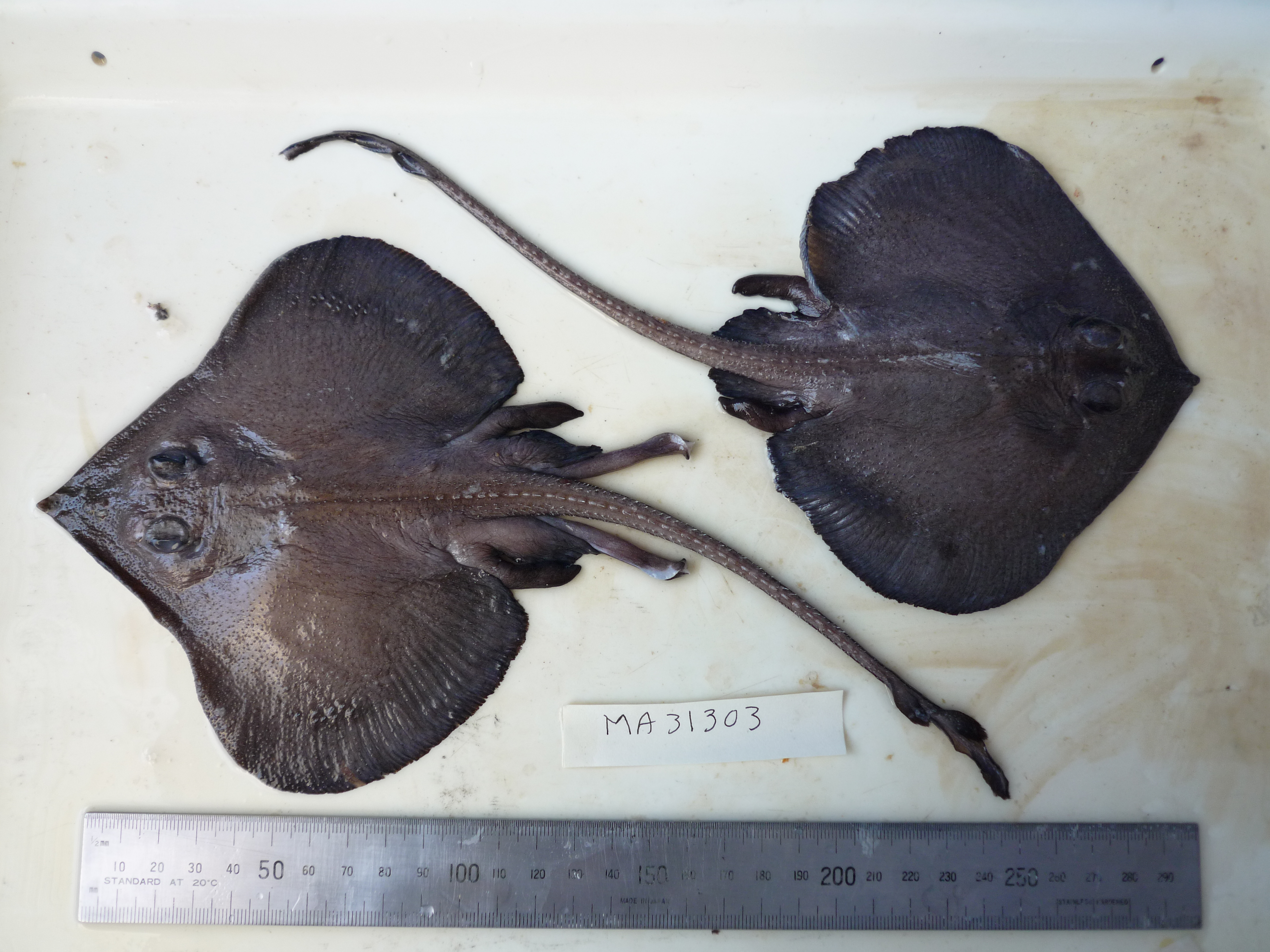

Scientific classification
- Kingdom: Animalia
- Phylum: Chordata
- Class: Chondrichthyes
- Subclass: Elasmobranchii
- Order: Rajiformes
- Family: Arhynchobatidae
- Genus: Pavoraja; Whitley, 1939

Type species
- Raja nitida Günther, 1880

Species
- See text.

= Pavoraja =

Genus of cartilaginous fishes

Pavoraja is a genus of skates in the family Arhynchobatidae from deeper waters off Australia.

== Description ==
Pavoraja are relatively small skates. The disc is semi-oval to heart-shaped. The snout has a small fleshy process at the tip.

== Species ==
There are six species:

- Pavoraja alleni McEachran & Fechhelm, 1982 (Allen's skate)
- Pavoraja arenaria Last, Mallick & Yearsley, 2008 (Sandy skate)
- Pavoraja mosaica Last, Mallick & Yearsley, 2008 (Mosaic skate)
- Pavoraja nitida (Günther, 1880) (Peacock skate)
- Pavoraja pseudonitida Last, Mallick & Yearsley, 2008 (False peacock skate)
- Pavoraja umbrosa Last, Mallick & Yearsley, 2008 (Dusky skate)
