= Pavoraja umbrosa =

Dusky skate

Conservation status
- Least Concern (IUCN 3.1)

Scientific classification
- Kingdom: Animalia
- Phylum: Chordata
- Class: Chondrichthyes
- Subclass: Elasmobranchii
- Order: Rajiformes
- Family: Arhynchobatidae
- Genus: Pavoraja
- Species: P. umbrosa

Binomial name
- Pavoraja umbrosa Last, Mallick and Yearsley, 2008

Species of fish

Pavoraja umbrosa, commonly known as the dusky skate, is a species of fish in the family Arhynchobatidae. It lives off the coast of north-eastern Australia in depths ranging from 360 to 731 meters. Its maximum size is 36.9 cm (14.5 in) total length.

Pavoraja umbrosa is a little-known species, although it might be common. Although it can occur as by-catch, current levels of fishing in its range are unlikely to pose a significant threat.
