= Pavoraja pseudonitida =

False peacock skate

Conservation status
- Least Concern (IUCN 3.1)

Scientific classification
- Kingdom: Animalia
- Phylum: Chordata
- Class: Chondrichthyes
- Subclass: Elasmobranchii
- Order: Rajiformes
- Family: Arhynchobatidae
- Genus: Pavoraja
- Species: P. pseudonitida

Binomial name
- Pavoraja pseudonitida Last, Mallick and Yearsley, 2008

Species of fish

Pavoraja pseudonitida, commonly known as the false peacock skate, is a species of fish in the family Arhynchobatidae. It lives in depths ranging from 212 to 512 meters in the western Pacific Ocean off the coast of north-eastern Australia. Its maximum size is 37.2 cm (14.6 in) total length.

Pavoraja pseudonitida might be the most common skate on the upper continental slope of northeast Australia. Although it can occur as by-catch, current levels of fishing in its range are unlikely to pose a significant threat.
