= Pavoraja mosaica =

Mosaic skate

Conservation status
- Least Concern (IUCN 3.1)

Scientific classification
- Kingdom: Animalia
- Phylum: Chordata
- Class: Chondrichthyes
- Subclass: Elasmobranchii
- Order: Rajiformes
- Family: Arhynchobatidae
- Genus: Pavoraja
- Species: P. mosaica

Binomial name
- Pavoraja mosaica Last, Mallick and Yearsley, 2008

Species of fish

Pavoraja mosaica, commonly known as the mosaic skate, is a species of fish in the family Arhynchobatidae. It lives in depths ranging from 300 meters to 450 meters off the northeastern coast of Australia. It can reach up to 27.9 cm (11.0 in) in total length.

Pavoraja mosaica has only been studied from a few specimens; therefore, nothing is known about its population size or trends. Although it can be spotted in a bycatch, current levels of fishing in its range are unlikely to pose a significant threat.
