= Hackett Hall =

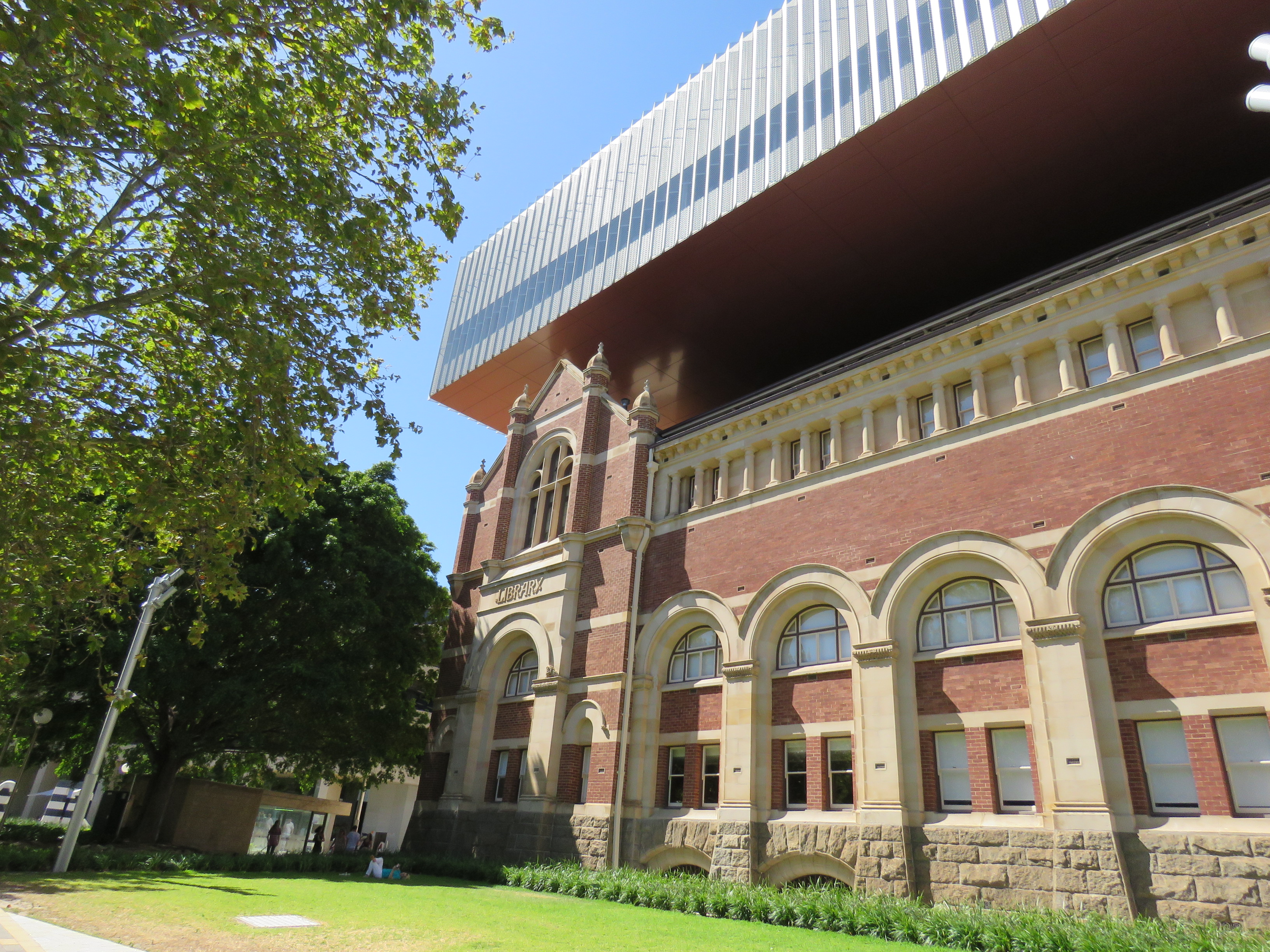
- Hackett Hall in January 2021
- Interactive map of the Hackett Hall area

General information
- Type: Heritage listed building
- Location: Perth, Western Australia
- Coordinates: 31.949592°S 115.8613°E

Western Australia Heritage Register
- Type: State Registered Place
- Designated: 16 October 1992
- Reference no.: 2026

Hackett Hall is a heritage listed building, previously housing part of the State Library of Western Australia. It is now a part of the new Western Australian Museum complex in the Perth Cultural Centre, in Western Australia. The name of the hall is related to the benefactor of the University of Western Australia, John Winthrop Hackett.

It was located on James Street, Perth and its western end was adjacent to the southern end of Museum Street. The Museum Street section between the former James Street and Francis Street was closed from traffic to create the Perth Cultural Centre.

It was designated as the main building of the Library in the 1930s as the Public Library of Western Australia in Hackett Hall. There is a hall of the same name at the University of Western Australia main campus. It was photographed at the early stages as a library space. It was renovated in 1957, registered as a heritage building in 1992 with the State Register of Heritage Places, and had been listed by the National Trust.

Hackett Hall is now the home of Otto, the WA museum's giant whale skeleton.

== Gallery ==
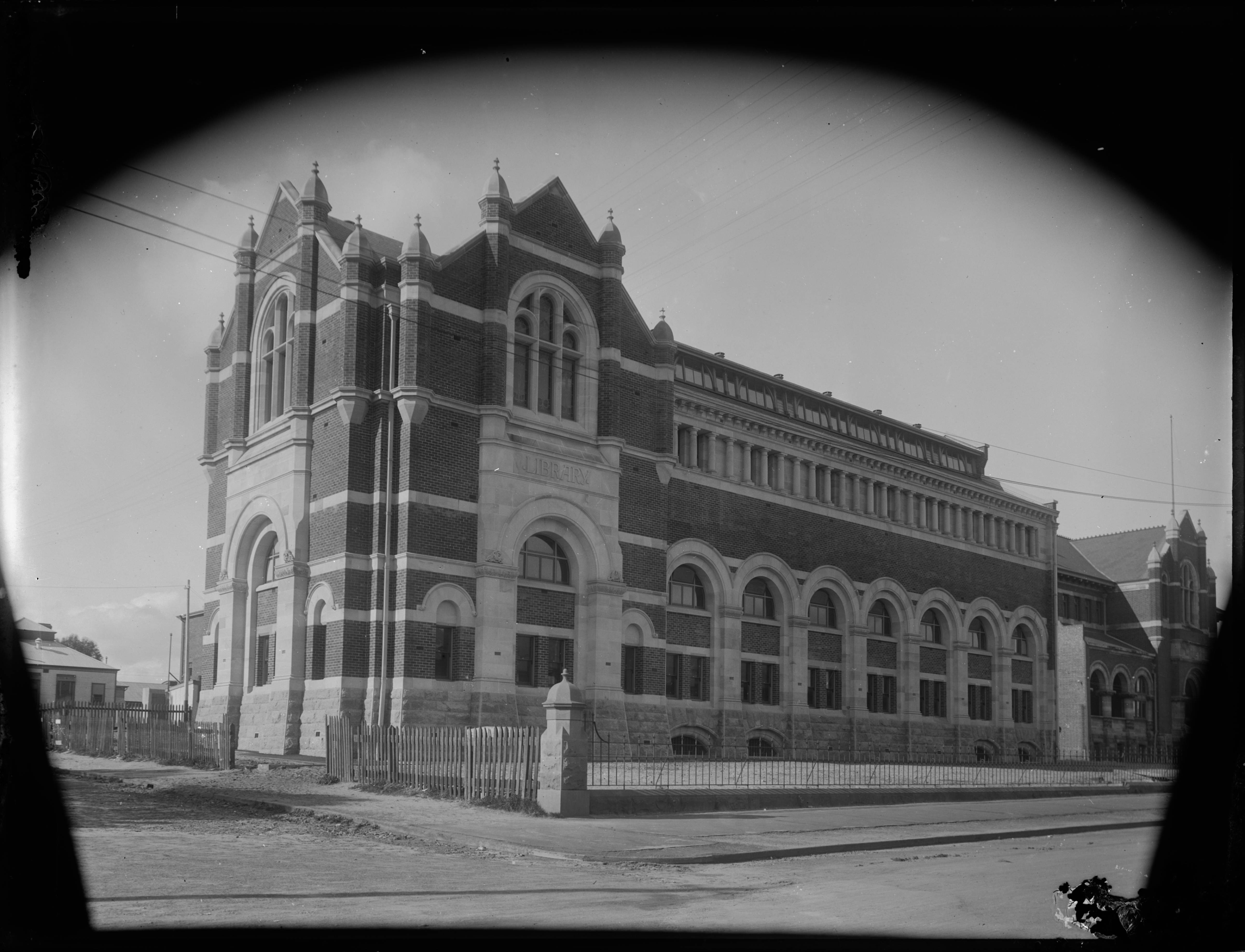
Hackett Hall in 1913

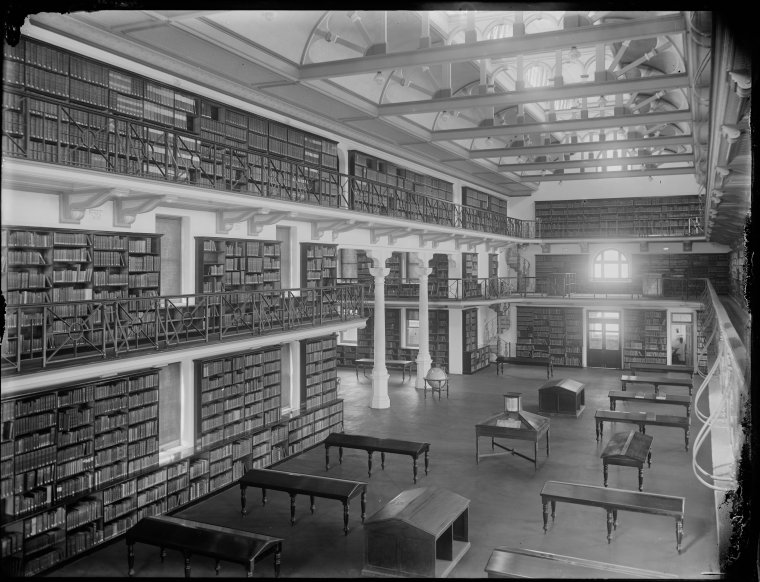

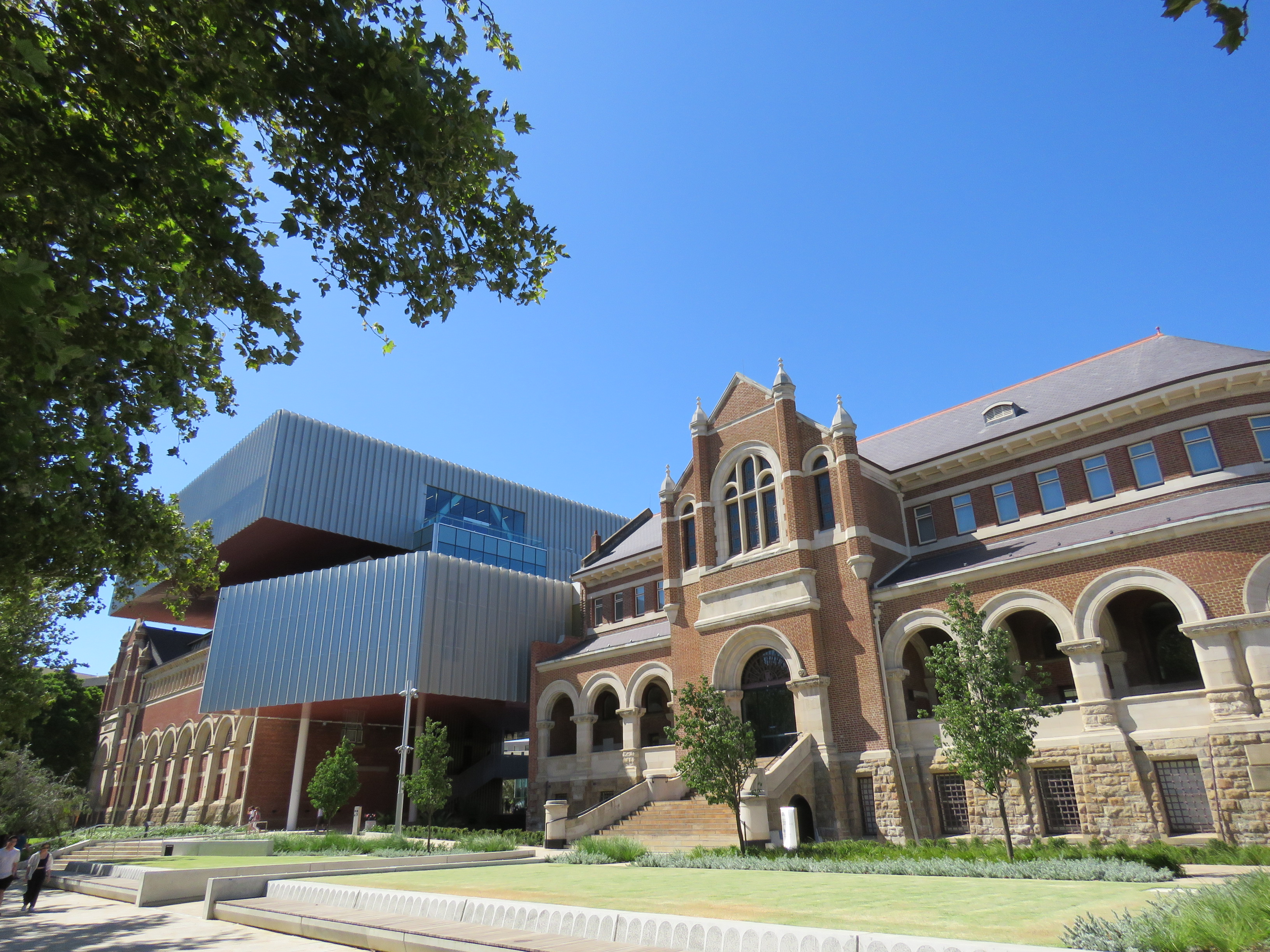

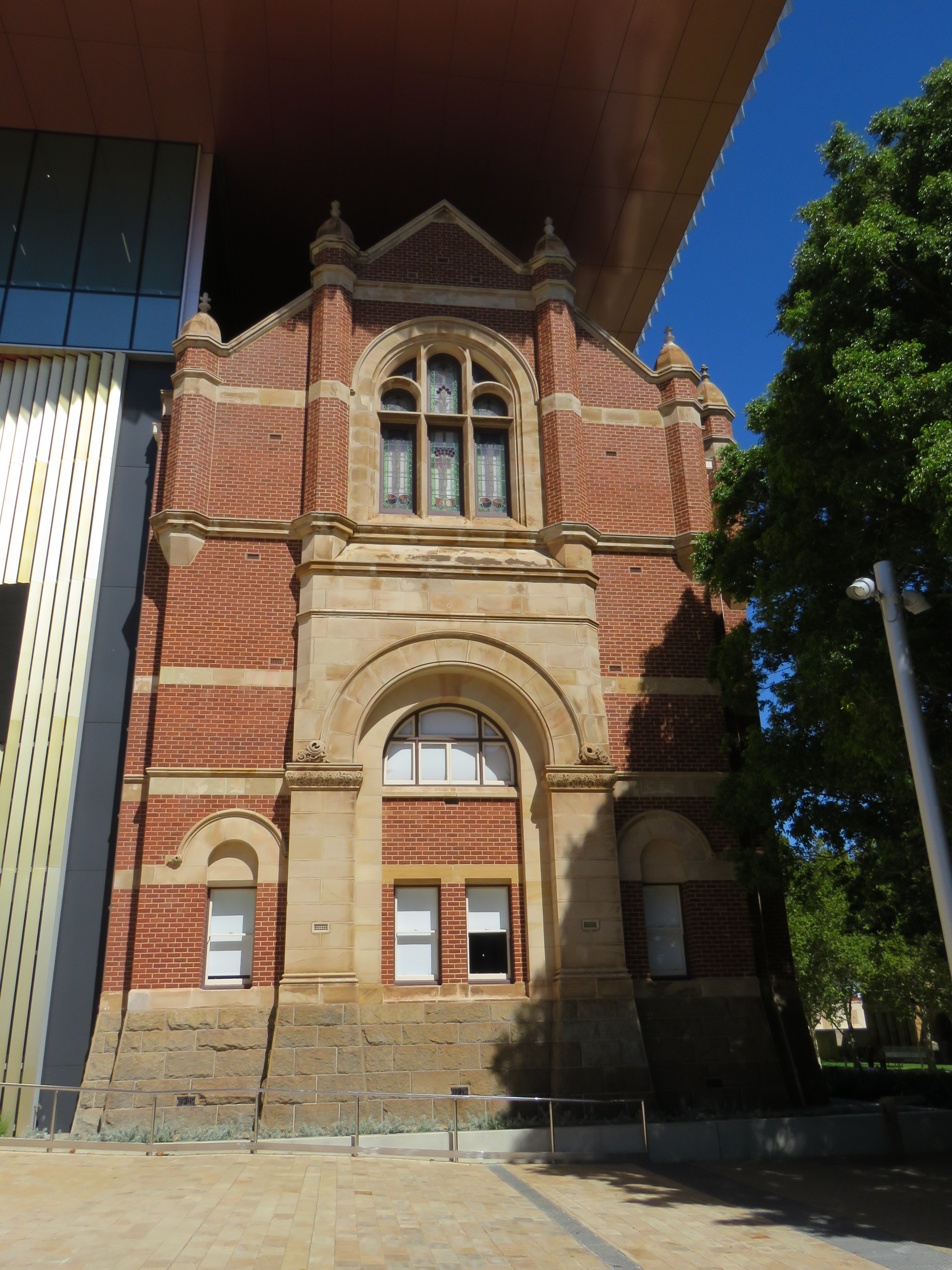

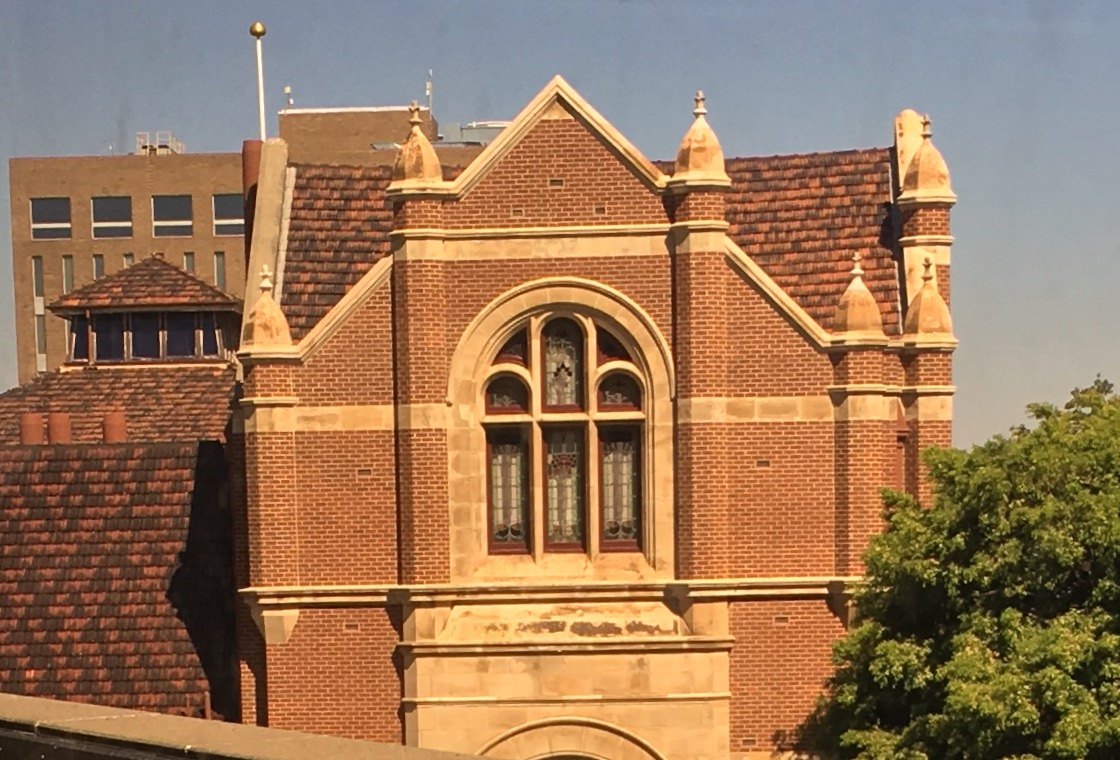

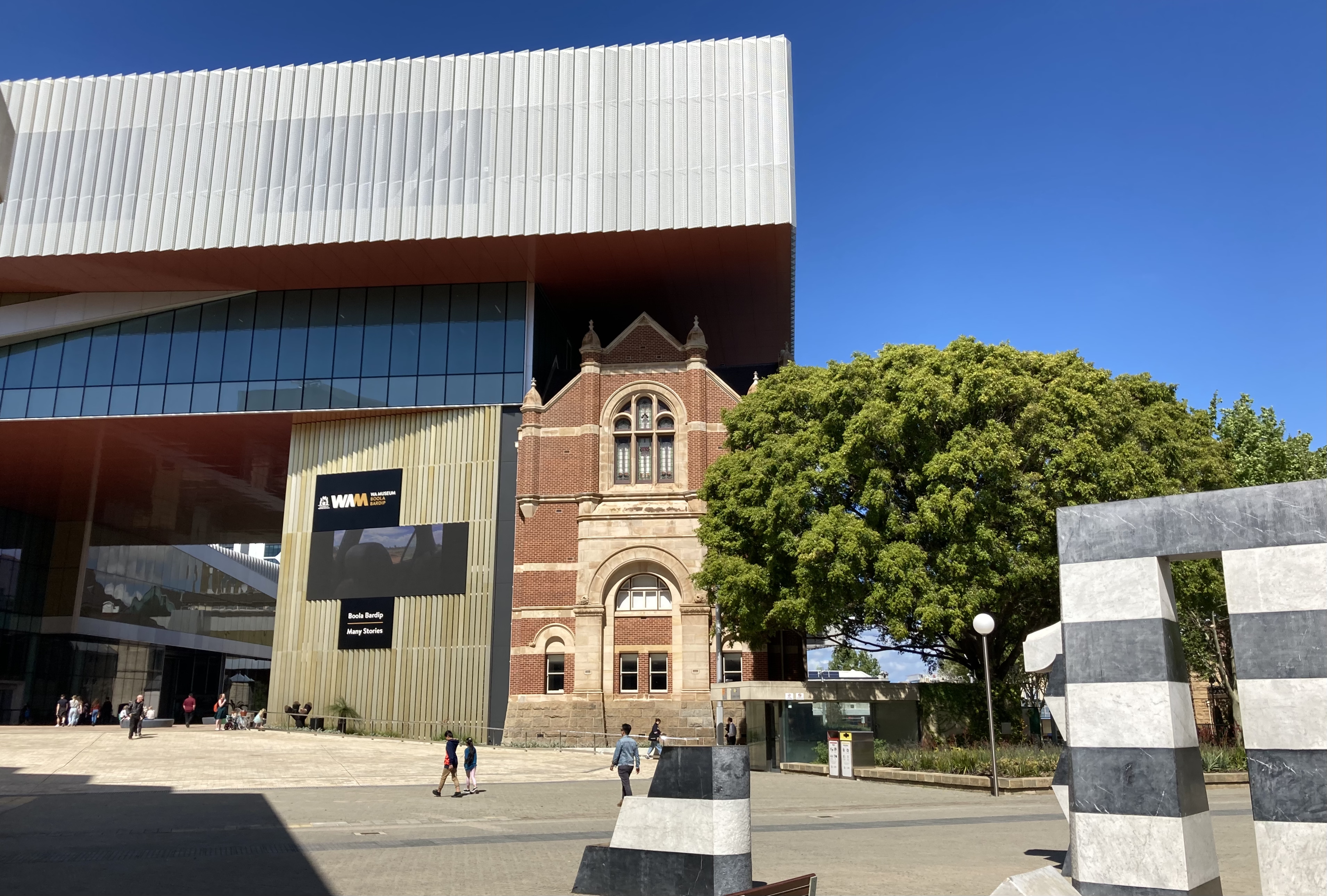

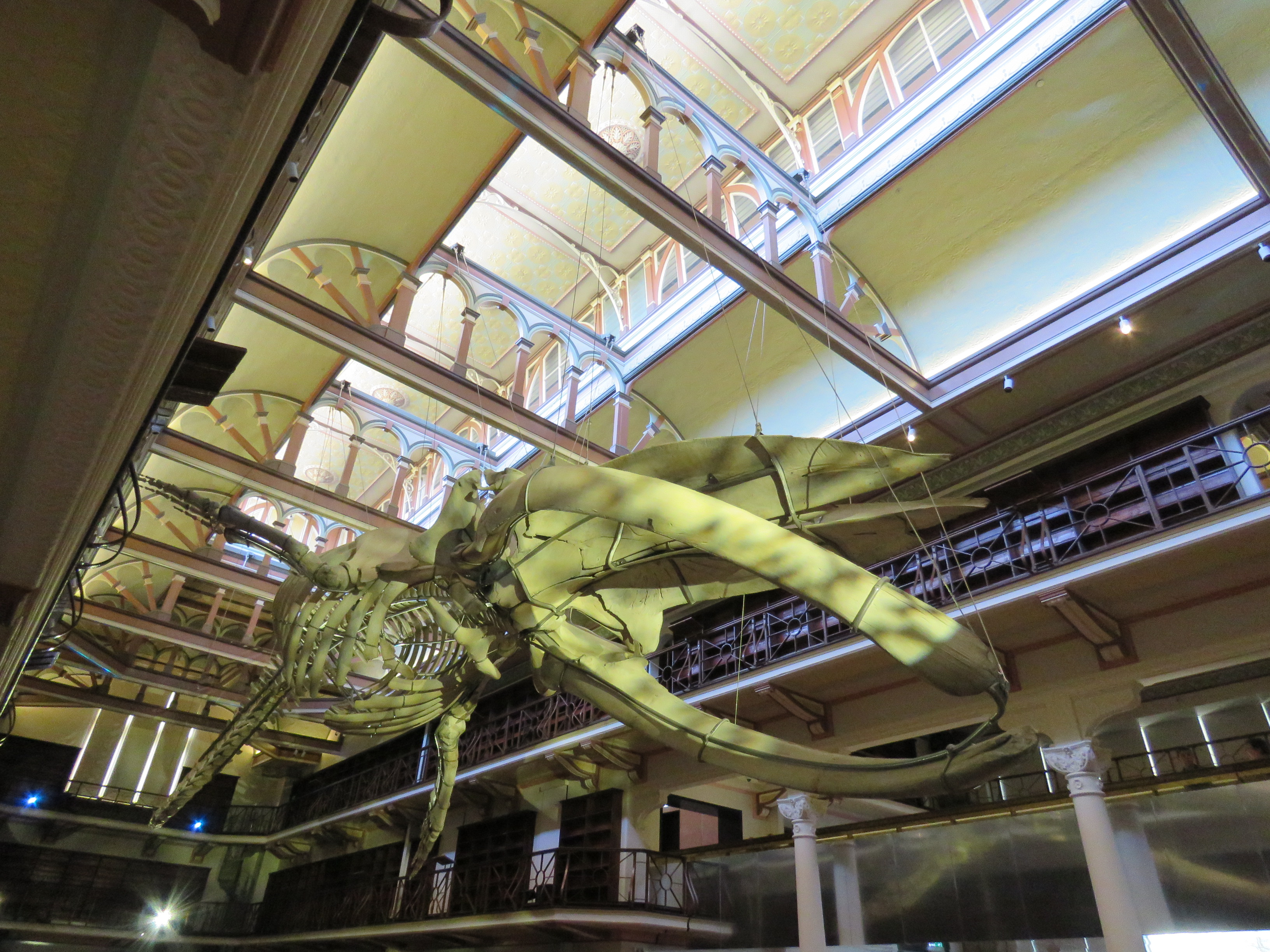

== See also ==
- Winthrop Hall
