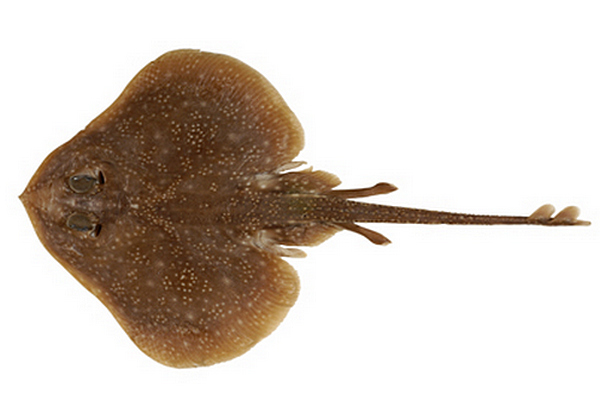

Conservation status
- Least Concern (IUCN 3.1)

Scientific classification
- Kingdom: Animalia
- Phylum: Chordata
- Class: Chondrichthyes
- Subclass: Elasmobranchii
- Order: Rajiformes
- Family: Arhynchobatidae
- Genus: Pavoraja
- Species: P. nitida

Binomial name
- Pavoraja nitida Günther, 1880

Synonyms
- Raja nitida Günther, 1880

= Pavoraja nitida =

Peacock skate

Species of fish

Pavoraja nitida, commonly known as the peacock skate, is a species of fish in the family Arhynchobatidae. It lives near the soft bottoms of the continental shelf near the coasts of southeastern Australia in depths ranging from 30 to 390 metres. It produces oblong egg capsules which have stiff horns in each corner and lays them in sandy or muddy flats. Its maximum size is 36.8 cm.
