= Western Australian Museum =

State museum of Western Australia

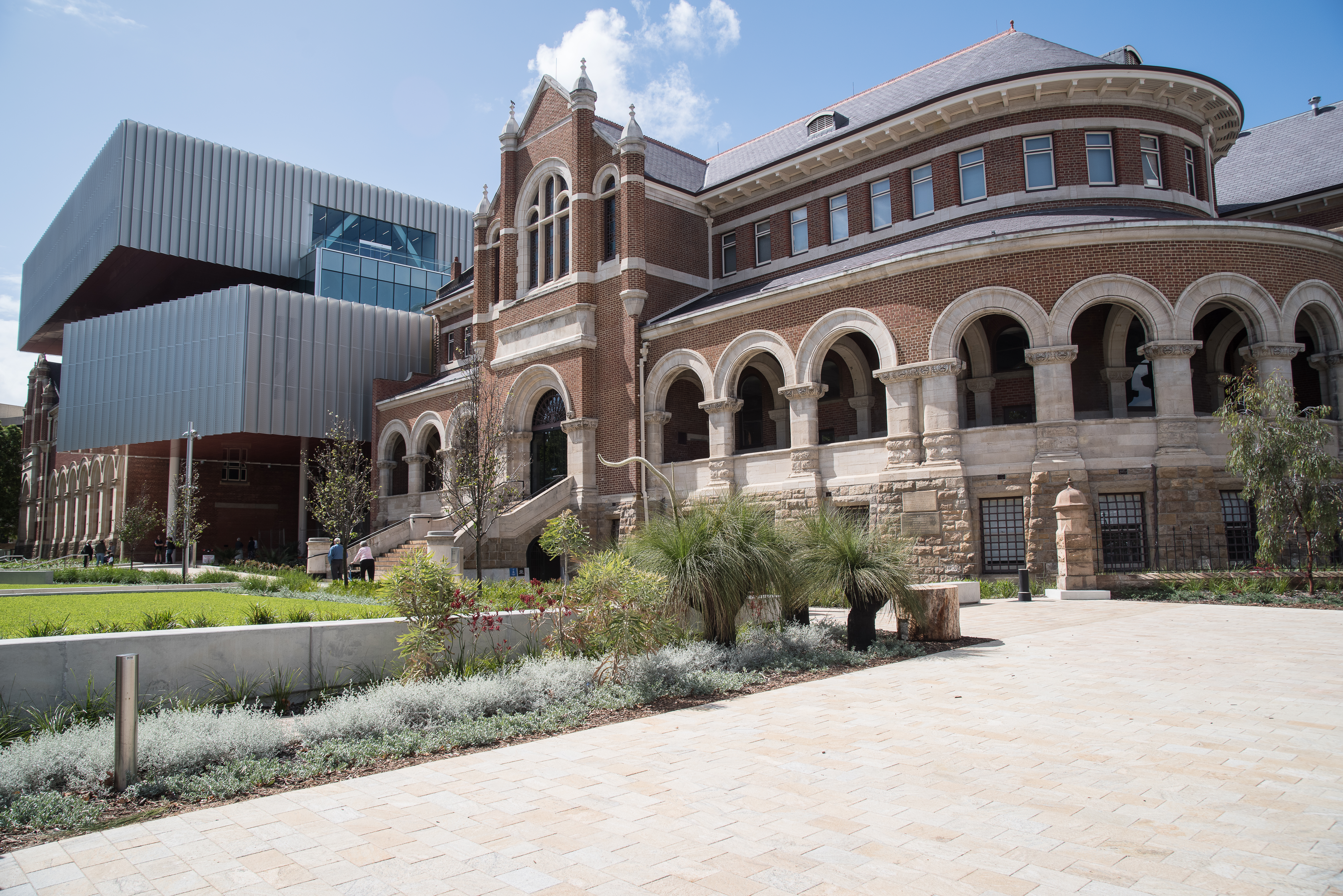
- WA Museum Boola Bardip in 2020
- Established: 1891; 135 years ago
- Location: Perth, Fremantle, Albany, Geraldton, Kalgoorlie-Boulder
- Coordinates: 31.949629°S 115.862402°E
- Collection size: 8,233,264
- Visitors: 971,528 (2021)
- Website: museum.wa.gov.au

The Western Australian Museum is a statutory authority within the Culture and the Arts Portfolio, established under the Museum Act 1969.

The museum has six main sites. The state museum, WA Museum Boola Bardip, is located in the Perth Cultural Centre. The other sites are: the WA Maritime Museum and WA Shipwrecks Museum in Fremantle, the Museum of the Great Southern in Albany, the Museum of Geraldton in Geraldton, and the Museum of the Goldfields in Kalgoorlie-Boulder.

== History ==
Established in 1891 in the Old Perth Gaol, it was known as the Geological Museum and consisted of geological collections. In 1892, ethnological and biological exhibits were added, and in 1897, the museum officially became the Western Australian Museum and Art Gallery. The museum employed collectors to obtain series of specimens; J. T. Tunney ventured across the state from 1895 to 1909 obtaining animals and, later, the tools and artefacts of the indigenous inhabitants.

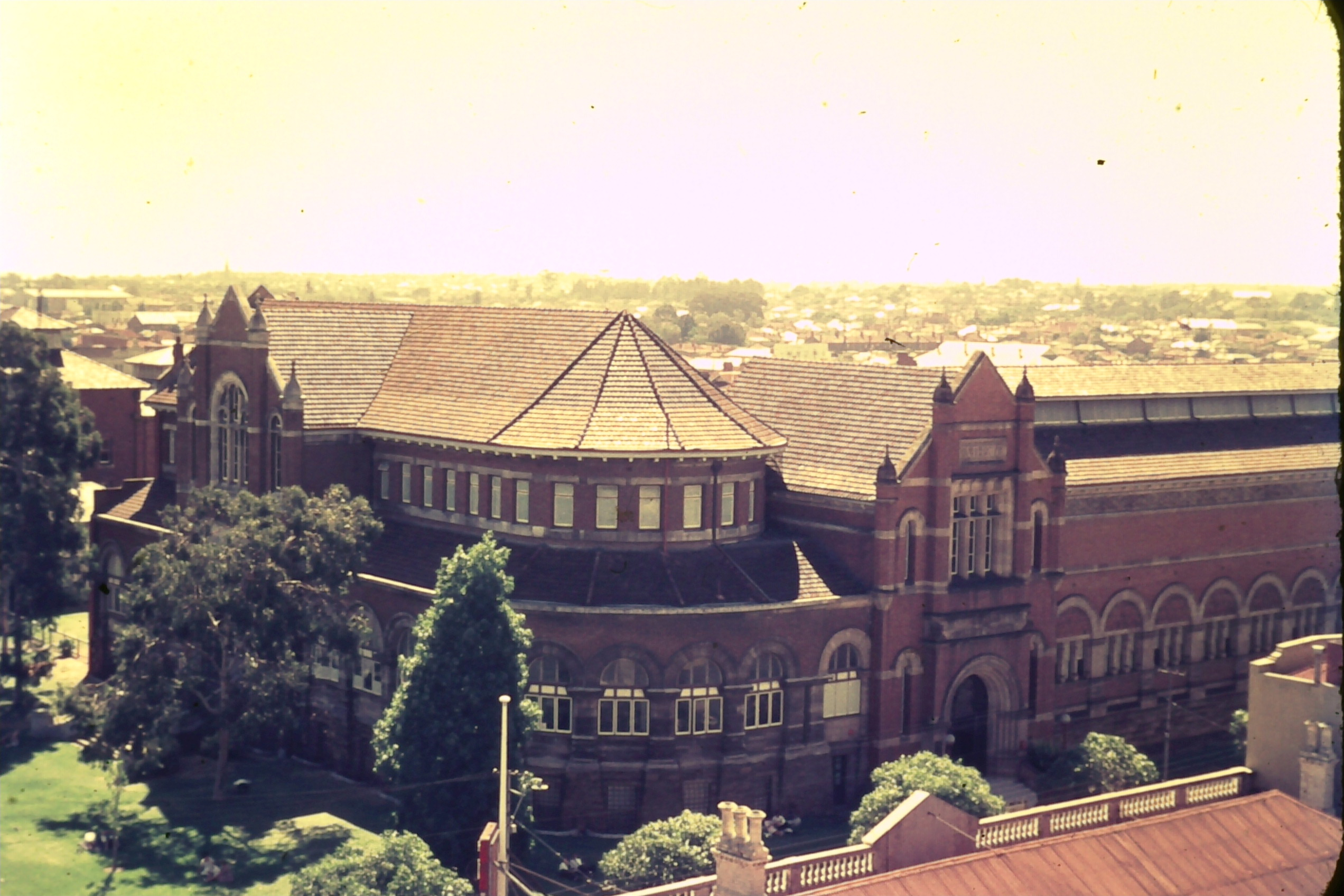
Western Australian Museum c. 1960

During 1959, the botanical collection was transferred to the new Western Australian Herbarium and the museum and the art gallery became separate institutions. The museum focussed its collecting and research interests in the areas of natural sciences, anthropology, archaeology, and Western Australia's history. Over the 1960s and 1970s, it also began to work in the then-emerging areas of historic shipwrecks and Aboriginal site management.

In February 2008, the Government of Western Australia announced that it would build a new A$500-million museum at the East Perth Power Station site, equivalent to A$693.7 million in 2022. However, following the election of a new State Liberal party government under Colin Barnett, the redevelopment plans were scrapped in early February 2009.

Old Western Australian Museum logo

On Museums day in 2012, the Barnett State Government pledged to build a new museum at the Perth Cultural Centre at a cost of A$428 million, equivalent to A$539.3 million in 2022, for completion by 2019–20. The Western Australian Museum – Perth site closed temporarily from 18 June 2016 until 2020 to construct the New Museum for WA, designed by OMA and Hassell.

In late 2014, critical improvements to the museum's Collection and Research Centre (CRC) in Welshpool commenced. This site continues to house the museum's research laboratories and working collections throughout the construction phase. The upgrades to the CRC include new collection storage, laboratories, and workshops to support ongoing research and to ensure that collections can be adequately prepared and conserved.

== Locations ==
The Western Australian Museum has six museum branches and four collection facilities. The museum also offers outreach services to all areas of Western Australia.

=== Perth ===
==== Old museum ====
On 9 September 1891, the Geological Museum was opened at the site of the Old Gaol and housed the state's first collection of geological samples. The Old Gaol still forms a significant part of the Western Australian Museum – Perth and is one of the oldest standing buildings in Western Australia.

Shortly after the Geological Museum was opened, collections were expanded to include geological, ethnological and biological specimens and in 1897, the Western Australian Museum and Art Gallery was declared. From 1971 to 2003, a greater part of the research and display collections were housed in a large building on Francis Street. This site was closed due to concerns with asbestos, and demolition concluded in late 2011.

Throughout the Western Australian Museum's history, the prominent James Street location remained central to the museum's identity and the location of many large permanent and touring exhibits. Exhibitions on fashion, natural history, cultural heritage and history have attracted large numbers of visitors, including A Day in Pompeii (25 May – 12 September 2010) which attracted more than 100,000 people.

Permanent exhibitions which were on display at the Western Australian Museum in Perth included:

- WA Land and People: This exhibition tells the story of Western Australia from prehistoric times of dinosaurs, to indigenous beginnings, and through to environmental issues of the present day.
- Diamonds to Dinosaurs: An exhibition exploring 12 billion years of WA's history, featuring specimens such as rocks from the Moon and Mars, pre-solar diamonds and dinosaur skeleton casts.
- Katta Djinoong: This exhibition depicts the history and culture of the Aboriginal peoples of Western Australia from past to present.
- Dampier Marine Gallery: This exhibit explores the biodiversity of the waters around the Dampier Archipelago.
- Mammal, Bird and Butterfly Galleries: These galleries contain extensive collections of various animals.

The museum closed for major redevelopment in June 2016.

The Perth site also included the Discovery Centre, designed to help children and adults interact and learn about the museum's collections and research. After the closure of the main museum for redevelopment, the Discovery Centre relocated to a Discovery Zone in the State Library of Western Australia in September 2016, but this closed permanently from 8 December 2019.

==== New museum ====
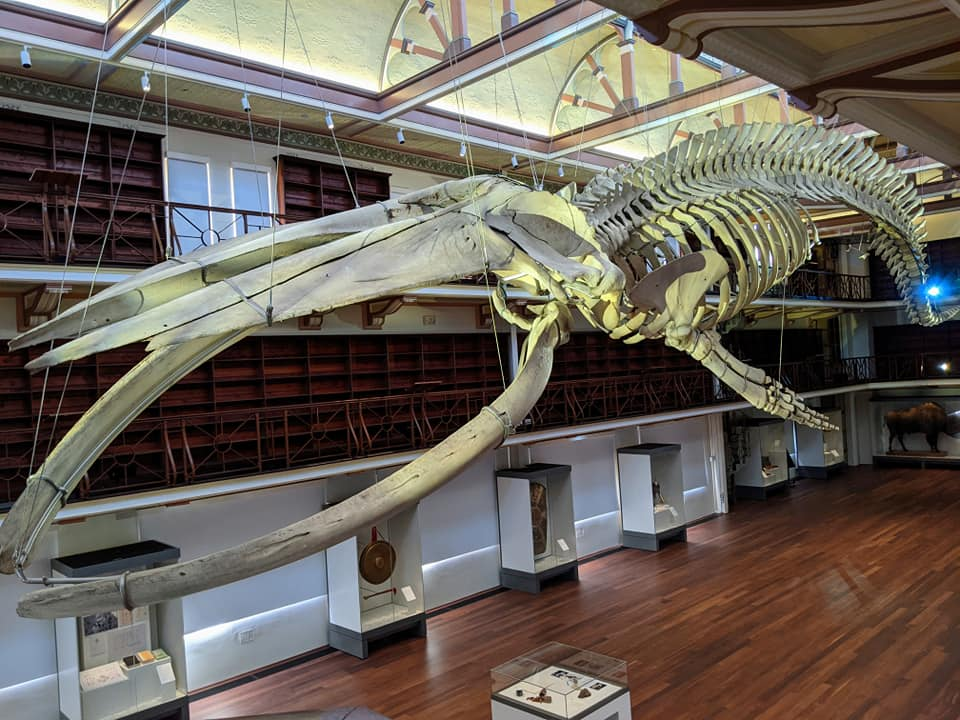
'Otto', the blue whale skeleton at Boola Bardip

After four years of construction, the Perth museum re-opened on Saturday, 21 November 2020. The new museum is named WA Museum Boola Bardip, (Note: Boola Bardip is Noongar for 'many stories'.) and features new exhibitions and topics such as the formation of the Universe, WA's latest inventions, dinosaurs, newly discovered species and local communities.

Inside the new complex are five heritage buildings, including the Old Perth Gaol, which dates back to 1855. It is also built around what is believed to be Australia's oldest grapevine, estimated to date from the 1850s or 1860s, and encompasses Hackett Hall, once home to the State Library of Western Australia, now displays the skeleton of a blue whale (nicknamed Otto), which was in storage since 2003. The Jubilee Building has been refurbished, with the terrace and grand entrance reopened.

=== Maritime and Shipwrecks Museums ===
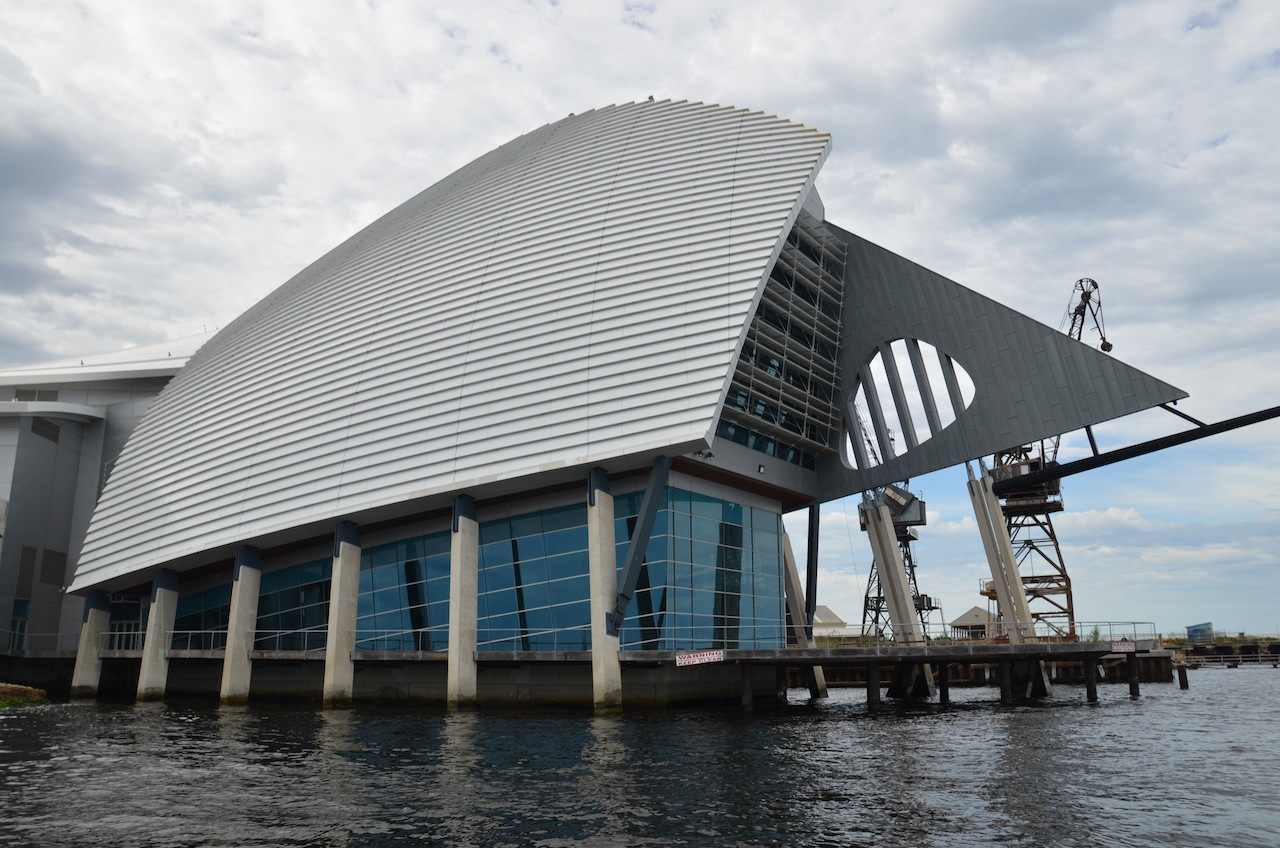
The WA Maritime Museum building on Victoria Quay, Fremantle

The Western Australian Museum has two branches in Fremantle: the WA Maritime Museum and WA Shipwrecks Museum (formerly known as Maritime Gallery and Shipwreck Gallery).

The WA Maritime Museum is located on Victoria Quay, and contains galleries with themes such as the Indian Ocean, the Swan River, fishing, maritime trade and naval defence. One of the museum's highlights is the yacht Australia II, which won the America's Cup in 1983. The museum is located in the historically significant Maritime Heritage Precinct, which includes the entrance to Fremantle Inner Harbour and associated installations; Forrest Landing - named after the pilot boat Lady Forrest which is also displayed inside the museum, the remnant of the original limestone bar used by Aboriginal men as a crossing point at the mouth of the Swan River; the migrant Welcome Walls memorial; and the World War II submarine slipway area.

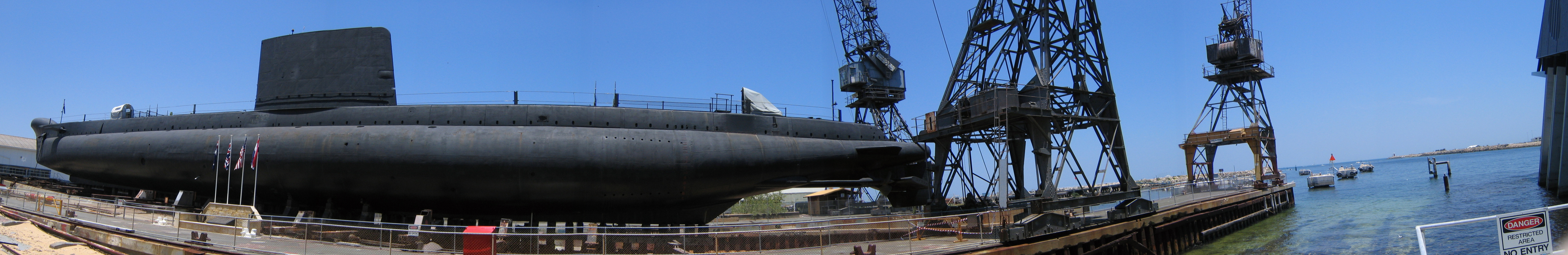
HMAS Ovens at the WA Maritime Museum

Immediately adjacent to the WA Maritime Museum on the WWII slipway is HMAS Ovens, an Oberon-class submarine that is open for guided tours and commemorates the World War II Fremantle allied submarine base, which was the largest submarine base in the southern hemisphere, with 170 submarines of the British, Dutch and US navies conducting patrols from there.

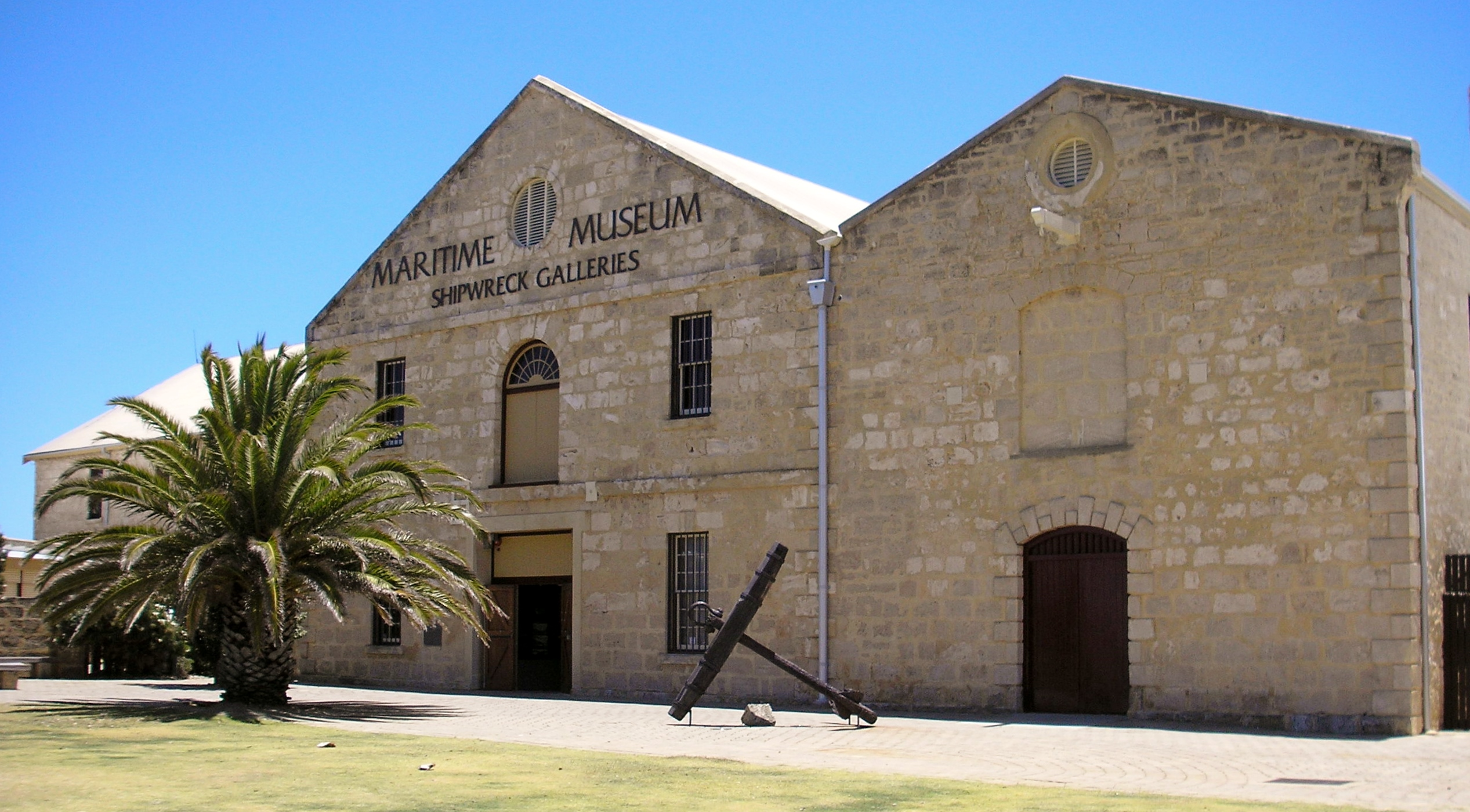
WA Shipwrecks Museum

Nearby in Cliff Street, the WA Shipwrecks Museum, housed in the 1850s-era Commissariat Buildings, is recognised as the foremost maritime archaeology and shipwreck conservation museum in the southern hemisphere. The museum contains a reconstructed hull of Dutch East India Company vessel Batavia, which was wrecked off the coast of Western Australia in 1629, and several other relics and artefacts from ships wrecked along the WA coast. It also houses the horizontal trunk engine recovered from the iron steamer SS Xantho, which sank in 1872. This unit, the only known example of the first mass-produced, high-speed and high-pressure marine engine, can now be turned over by hand. The museum's CEO is also responsible for the historic wrecks off the coast of Western Australia, and many shipwrecks appear in the exhibits. In 1980, the museum also commenced the development of a "Museum-Without-Walls" program via its "wreck trail" or "wreck access" programs at Rottnest Island. These "trails" now appear at many places along the coast.

The Maritime Archaeology department primarily researches shipwreck archaeology from the Western Australian coast, including the famous Batavia shipwreck. Its staff members are involved in developing artefact management and cataloguing strategies, outreach and wreck-access programs, site-inspection techniques, and studies of diverse maritime sites, such as iron ship archaeology, characterised by its SS Xantho program and underwater aviation archaeology. The department also conducts master's level programs in maritime archaeology in collaboration with University of Western Australia.

=== Museum of the Great Southern ===
Refurbished in July 2010, the Museum of the Great Southern is situated at the site of the first colonial settlement in Western Australia, (Note: The Wiebbe Hayes Stone Fort on West Wallabi Island is the oldest surviving European building in Australia. It was built by survivors of the Batavia shipwreck and massacre in 1629, predating Frederick Town by 197 years and indeed James Cook's first visit to Australia by 141 years. Frederick Town became Albany in 1831 upon becoming a part of the Swan River Colony.) in Albany. This museum explores the region's biodiversity, the stories of the indigenous Noongar people and ancient natural environment.

The museum was the original residence of Major Edmund Lockyer, the commanding officer of the settlement group that landed in Princess Royal Harbour on 26 December 1826, and formally proclaimed sovereignty on 21 January 1827 for King George IV of Great Britain, naming the place King George's Sound settlement (later renamed Frederickstown and then renamed again Albany). Together with the Old Gaol, and the buildings of the Amity heritage precinct (Breaksea Museum) and the non-navigable replica of the brig Amity, they were the subject of investigation by the Commonwealth of Australia and UNESCO as a convict colonial settlement (not included in the formal nomination).

=== Museum of Geraldton ===
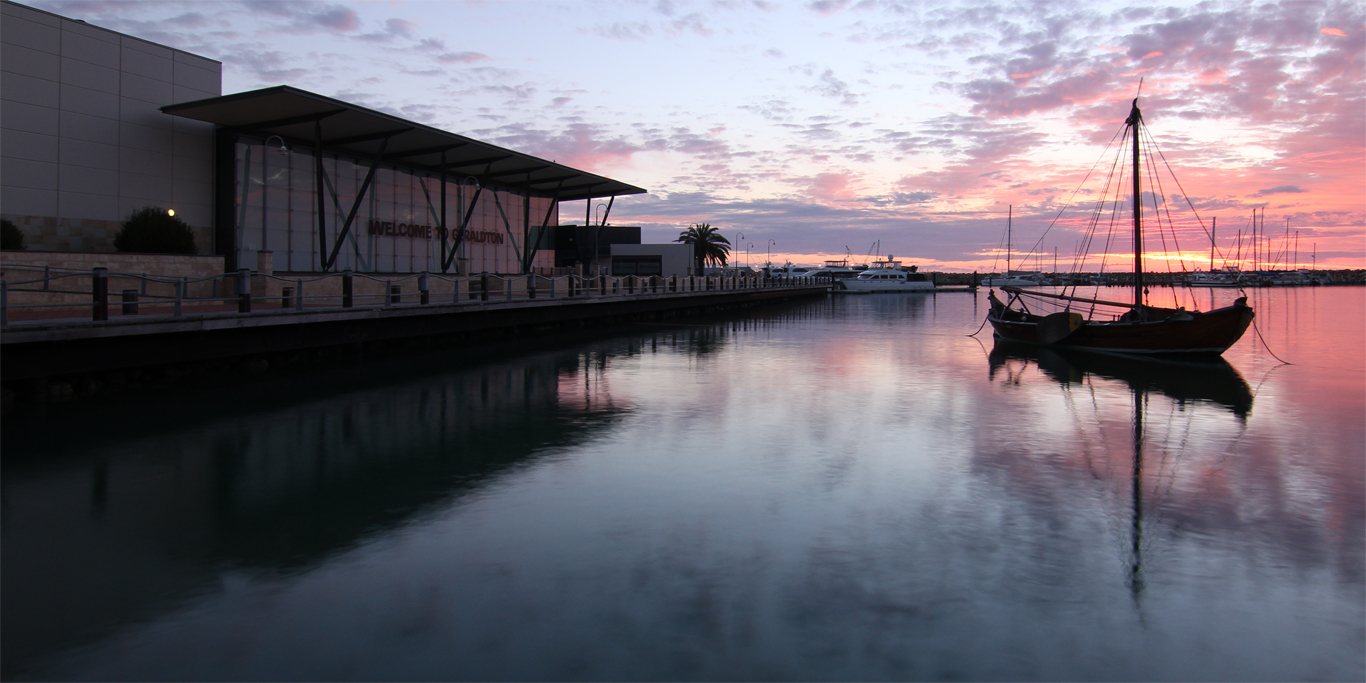
Geraldton Museum overlooking the marina

The Museum of Geraldton is situated in Western Australia's rapidly growing mid-west region. This museum explores the region's biodiversity, mining and agricultural history, the stories of the indigenous Yamaji people and the Dutch shipwrecks. The famous 17th-century Dutch vessel Batavia sank in the nearby Abrolhos Islands. This museum features the portico recovered from this wreck, which has been reconstructed to form the centre of the museum's shipwreck gallery.

=== Museum of the Goldfields ===
The Museum of the Goldfields in Kalgoorlie explores the history of the Eastern Goldfields, the city's mining heritage and the hardships faced by the early mining and pioneer families.

== Research departments ==
The Western Australian Museum has an extensive research program, with museum scientists and curators specialising in the fields of aquatic zoology, archaeology and anthropology, conservation, earth and planetary sciences, history, and terrestrial zoology. The museum also has a specialist materials conservation team.

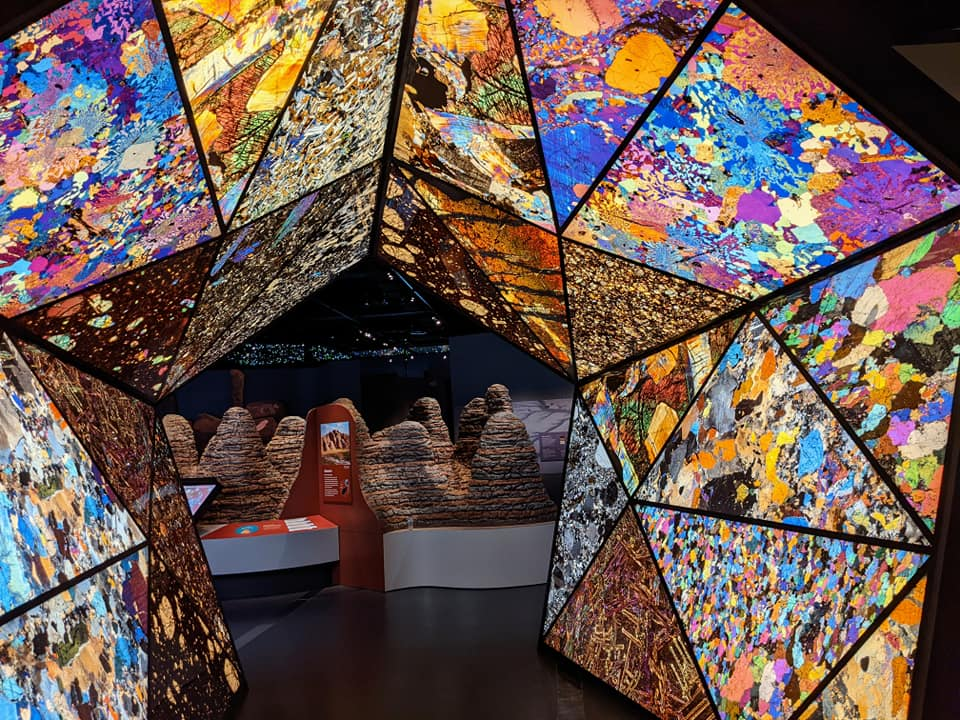
Arch at Boola Bardip displaying petrographic microscope images of different minerals

The WA Museum Collections and Research Centre (CRC) at 49 Kew Street, Welshpool, houses most of the museum's collections and research facilities. It houses the following departments (staff and collections):

- The Terrestrial Zoology department maintains large collections of a wide variety of terrestrial animals, including both terrestrial invertebrates and vertebrates, as well as marine mammals. The department includes sections that study: subterranean biology, ornithology, mammalogy, entomology, vertebrate biogeography, arachnids and myriapods and herpetology.
- The Aquatic Zoology department is responsible for documenting and researching the marine, estuarine and freshwater fauna of Western Australia. The department includes sections that study malacology, ichthyology, crustacea, marine invertebrates and worms.
- The Earth and Planetary Sciences Department studies and collects in the areas of fossils (invertebrate, vertebrate, plant and trace fossils), minerals, rocks, gems, meteorites and tektites. The department's collection holds taxonomic and stratigraphic (rock layers and layering) material that is representative of Western Australia's palaeobiological (the biology of fossil animals and plants) evolution and geological history from 3.8 billion years ago to a few thousand years ago. There are over 1.5 million items in the department collections.
- The History Department specialises in developing collections reflecting the material life of Western Australians, and researching the story of the people and places in Western Australia in all its diversity. The department also holds the Edith Cowan University Museum of Childhood Collection (ECU Museum of Childhood Collection), a nationally significant collection of 24,000 items is reflective of Western Australian childhood, donated to the WA Museum in 2009 by Edith Cowan University.
- The Anthropology and Archaeology Department specialises in cultural anthropology and archaeology. The department's research, collections and public programs focus on understanding what it is to be human, cultural diversity, exploring complex relationships between society, culture, language, sociality and economy. The department specialises in the study of Ancient Egypt, Aboriginal cultures (particularly the South West, Pilbara, Desert and Kimberley regions) and indigenous cultures of the Ancient World.

There are also some of the collection items from the Maritime Archaeology and Maritime History departments housed at the CRC; however staff from Maritime Archaeology and Maritime History are located at WA Shipwrecks Museum.

The Materials Conservation department is responsible for ensuring the millions of items in the museum's collections are permanently preserved for reference, research and exhibition through the use of preventive and remedial conservation techniques in accordance with international and national standards of best practice. The Materials Conservation department also possesses a research division in its overall structure which develop conservation techniques and methodologies.

== Publications ==
The museum has produced its own publications of books over time, as well as Records of the Western Australian Museum since 1910 and for a short time between 1998 and 2005 produced Tracks. The Records of the Museum is the museum's peer-reviewed journal which publishes the results of research into all branches of natural sciences and social and cultural history. Between 1910 and 2012, over 800 articles were published in this journal, the vast majority written after 1975. All individual articles published through the records are available for free download on the WA Museum website.

== Controversy ==
In December 2020 the Western Australian Museum removed what it said were two factual errors on labels in a multimedia display after complaints about their veracity, including from the consul general of the People's Republic of China (PRC) in Perth. One pertained to COVID-19, which the museum initially labelled as originating from China. The other pertained to Taiwan, which the museum initially depicted on a map as a country, specifically the Republic of China (ROC), that is distinct from China rather than including "Taiwan as a Chinese territory". This is controversial because "China regards Taiwan as a breakaway province which it has vowed to retake, by force if necessary. It says the ROC's lack of diplomatic recognition proves that the world agrees there is only one China."

The museum altered the visuals in response to the complaints, saying that the World Health Organization is still investigating the origin of COVID-19, and that the map "did not include Taiwan ... as part of China, which is not in line with Australian government policy". However, Mark McGowan, the premier of Western Australia, stated that "the decision to change the exhibits was the museum's." Additionally, Mark Harrison, a senior lecturer in Chinese studies at the University of Tasmania, pointed out that contrary to the museum's claims, including Taiwan as part of China is "not actually reflective of 'Australian government policy'". Rather, the Australian government "uses a deliberate ambiguity on the status of Taiwan" and "is very careful to not use maps of national boundaries that show Taiwan as part of the PRC".

The changes drew a critical reaction from Human Rights Watch researcher Sophie McNeill, who said that it is "very important that our cultural institutions rely on accuracy and facts and don't bow to pressure from the Chinese Communist Party who are often trying to censor and rewrite history". In a statement, the museum rejected any claims of bowing to bullying, saying the errors "were literally factual errors that we were very happy to correct", and that the errors were corrected in line with the museum's policy on accuracy.

== Gallery ==
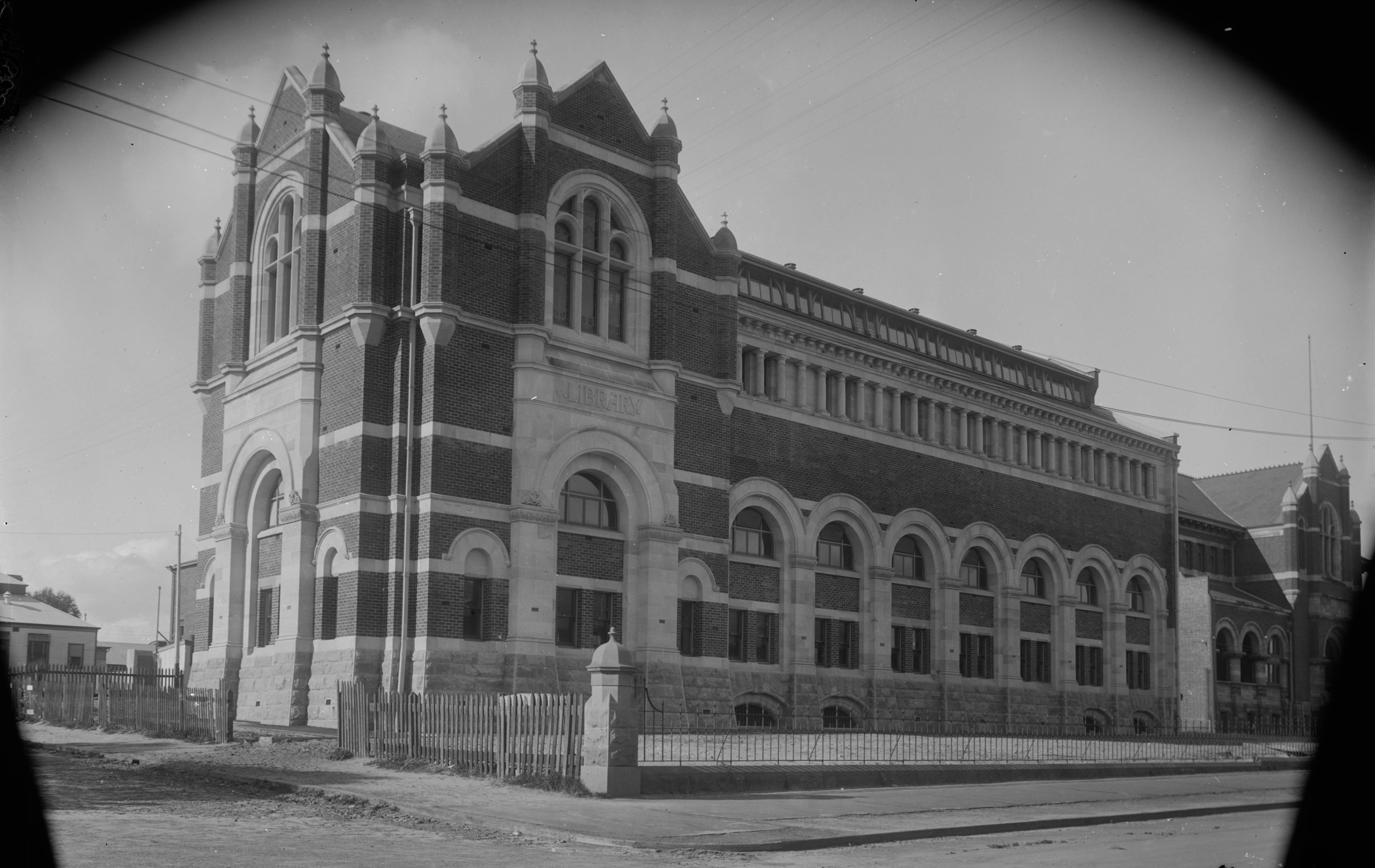
Hackett Hall in 1913. The building is now part of WA Museum Boola Bardip.

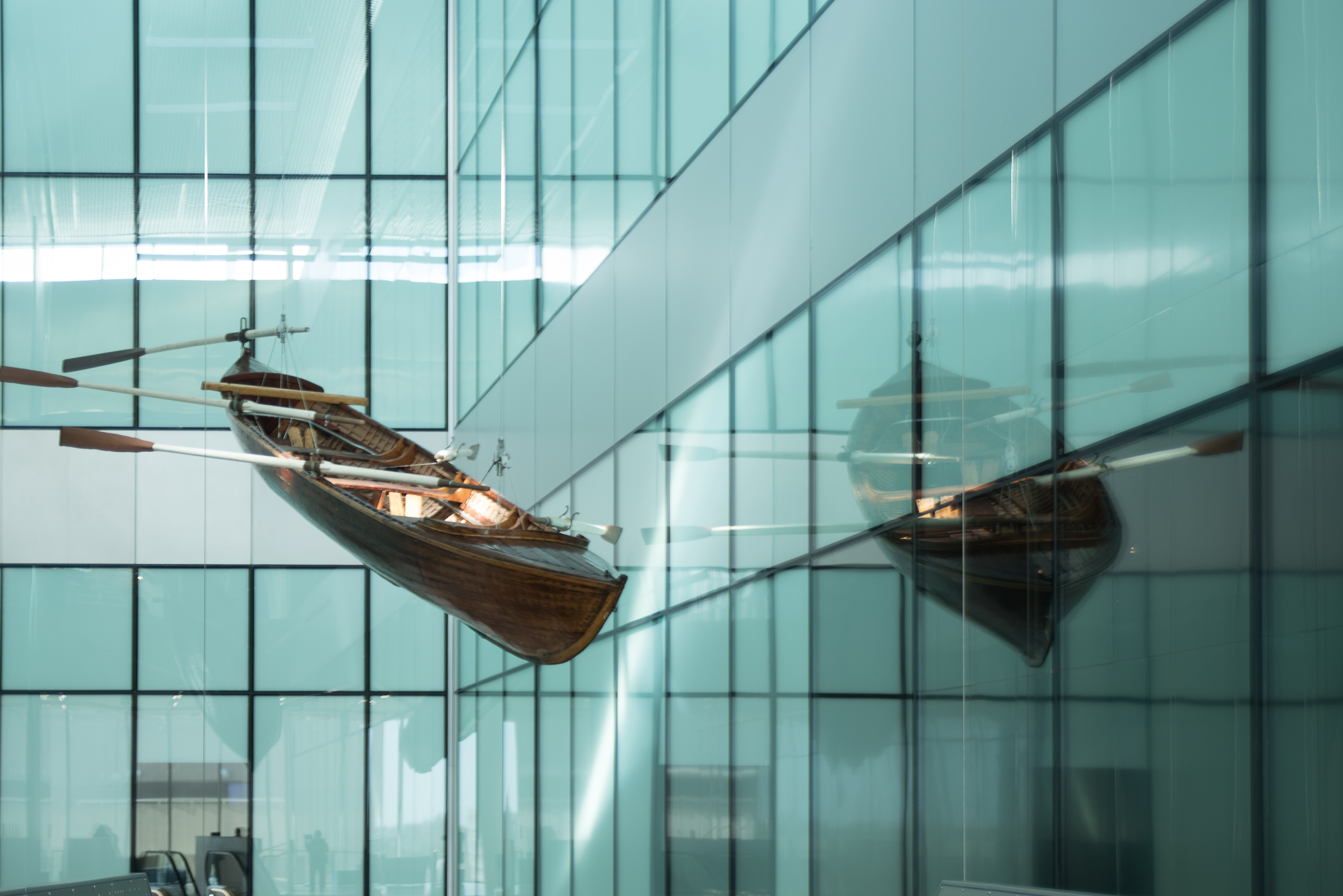

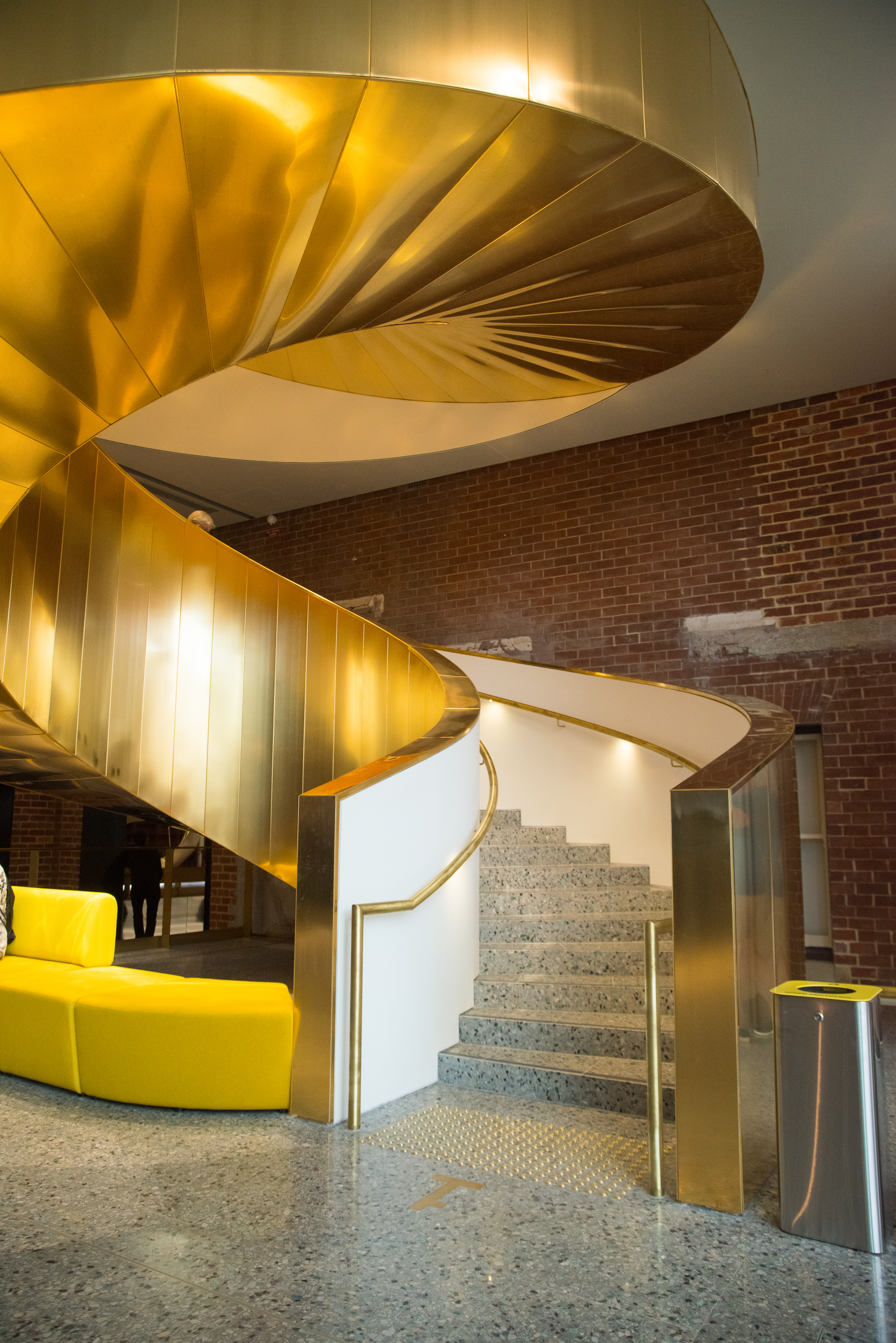

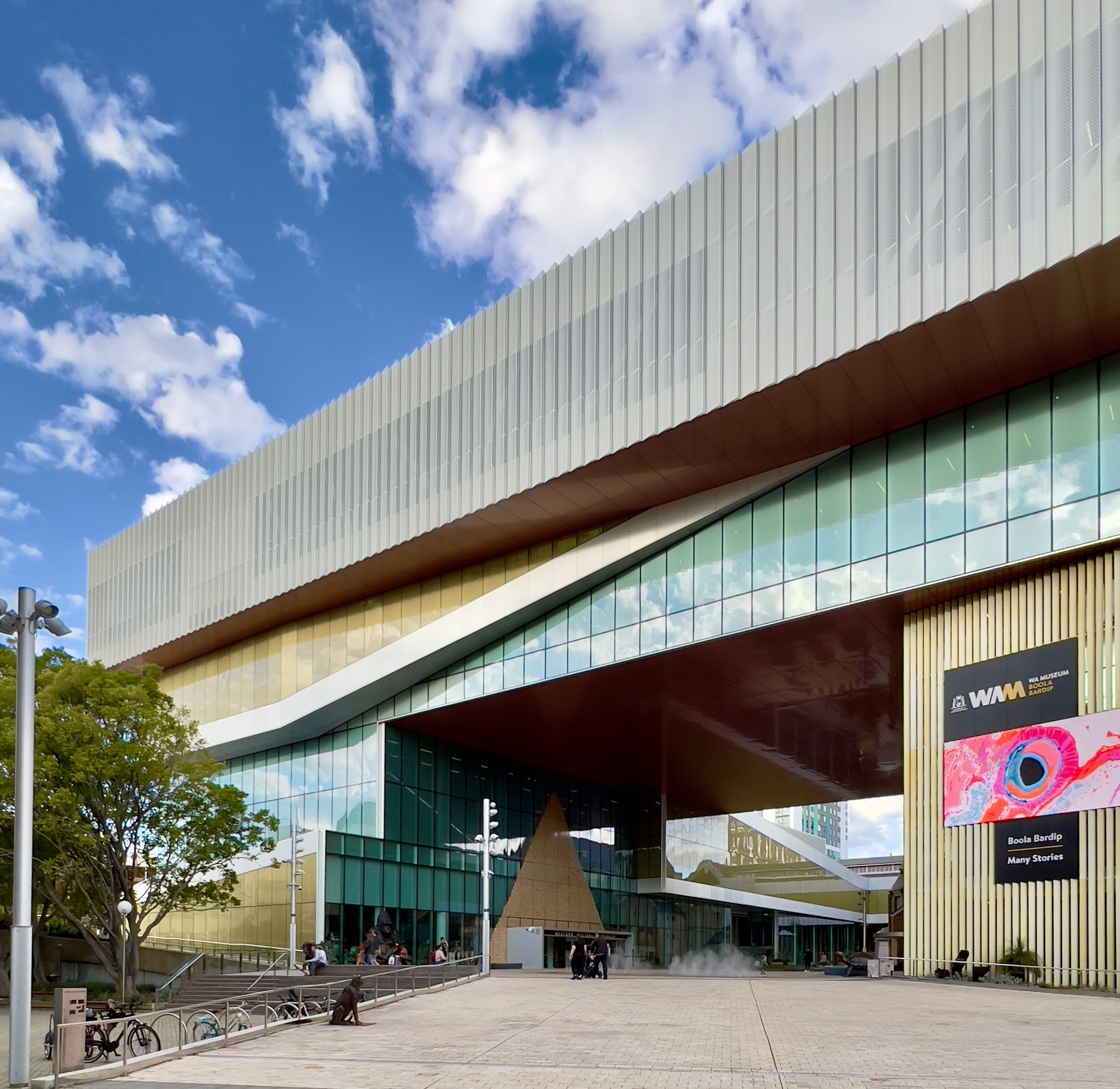

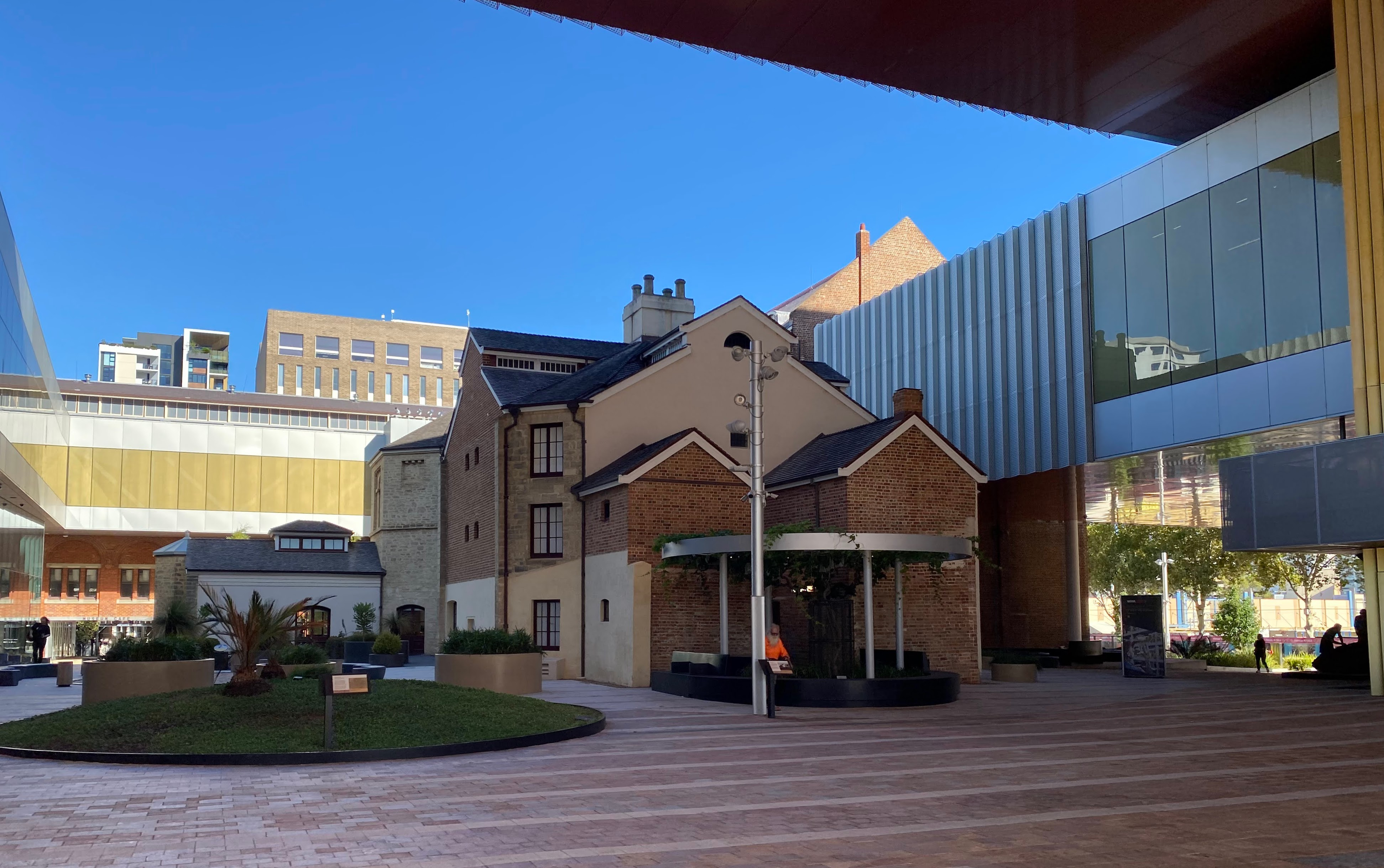

== See also ==
- List of museums in Western Australia
