= Perth Cultural Centre =

Precinct in Perth, Western Australia

- Precinct
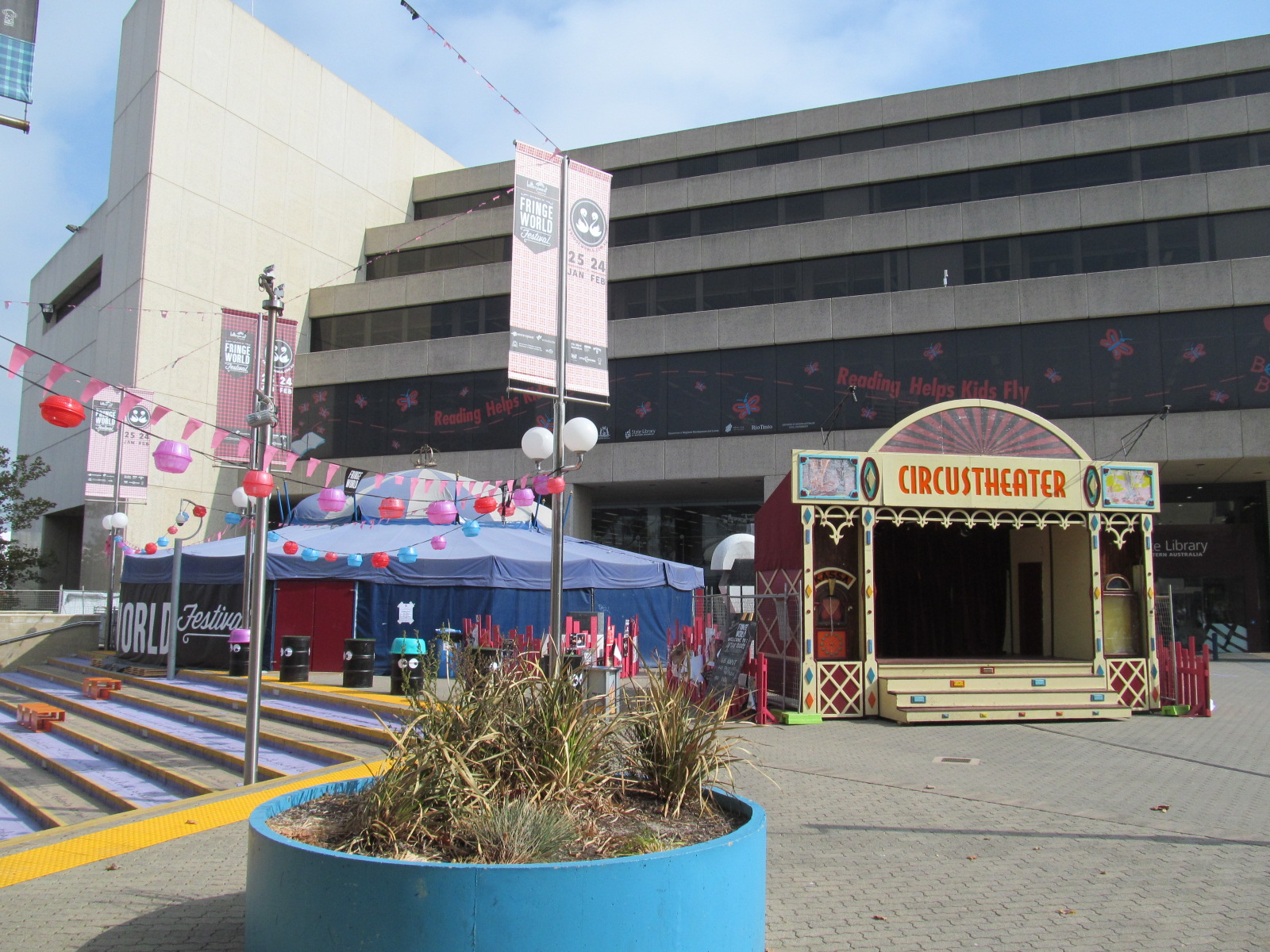
- Perth Cultural Centre (●) is situated north of Perth railway station and east of Northbridge
- Location within Perth
- Coordinates: 31.949699°S 115.860761°E
- Country: Australia
- LGA: City of Perth
- Suburb: Perth (suburb)

Area
  - Total: 8.62 ha (21.3 acres)

Dimensions
  - Length: 0.336 km (0.209 mi)
  - Width: 0.290 km (0.180 mi)
- Time zone: UTC+08:00 (WST)
- Website: www.ptt.wa.gov.au/venues/perth-cultural-centre/

The Perth Cultural Centre is an area of central Perth, Western Australia, near the James Street Mall.

It is home to a number of cultural institutions including the Art Gallery of Western Australia, Western Australian Museum, State Library of Western Australia, State Records Office, State Theatre Centre of Western Australia, Perth Institute of Contemporary Arts, The Blue Room Theatre plus a number of coffee shops and bars.

The Perth Cultural Centre precinct is bound by Roe Street, Aberdeen Street, Beaufort Street and William Street in the suburb of Perth. A walkway called Gallery Walk, named to commemorate the 100th anniversary of the Art Gallery of Western Australia, connects the centre to Perth railway station.

From 1 July 2018, the Perth Theatre Trust took over responsibility for the management and activation of the Perth Cultural Centre from the Metropolitan Redevelopment Authority.

== History ==
Earliest construction on the site dates back to the 1850s, when a portion of the site was designated for use as a gaol and police quarters.

Most development of the area occurred at the beginning of the twentieth century, when the former Perth Boys School was built. (This building now houses the Perth Institute of Contemporary Arts.) Further developments came in the following years, with the construction of Hacket Hall, the former Art Gallery Building, the former Perth Courts, and the former Police Quarters.

The next major stage of development occurred in the 1970s and 1980s following a plan for a central Perth cultural centre, as developed in the 1955 Perth and Fremantle metropolitan plan and later refined in the 1963 Metropolitan Region Scheme.

=== Redevelopment ===
In the years after the completion of the Perth Cultural Centre, the underused space gained a reputation for being isolated and unsafe, and sparked an initiative to redevelop and "revive" the area. Tasked with such an initiative, in 2008, the Metropolitan Redevelopment Authority and the Department of Culture and the Arts, spent approximately A$35 million, equivalent to A$48.6 million in 2022, on redevelopment efforts, including the creation of the State Theatre Centre of Western Australia, an "urban orchard", and a continuous roster of public cultural events.

=== Rejuvenation project ===
From 6 January 2025, the Perth Cultural Centre has undergone a "rejuvenation", aimed to make the space more "a more welcoming public space for families, tourists, and lovers of arts and culture".

== Institutions ==
Name	Facilities
Art Gallery of Western Australia	Gallery; Art Gallery Bar; Art Gallery Cafe
The Blue Room Theatre	Main Space - 62-seat theatre; Theatre Studio - 50-seat theatre; Bar
Perth Institute of Contemporary Arts	Gallery; Performance Space; Pica Bar
State Library of Western Australia	J S Battye Library; The Story Place; Ground Floor Gallery; The Story Place Gallery; Library Theatre; Small conference rooms; Computers and printers
State Records Office of Western Australia	
State Theatre Centre of Western Australia	Heath Ledger Theatre - 575-seat theatre; Studio Underground - 234-seat theatre; The Courtyard 200-seat performance space; Middar Room; Rehearsal Room 1
Western Australian Museum	City Room; Hackett Hall; Epoch cafe

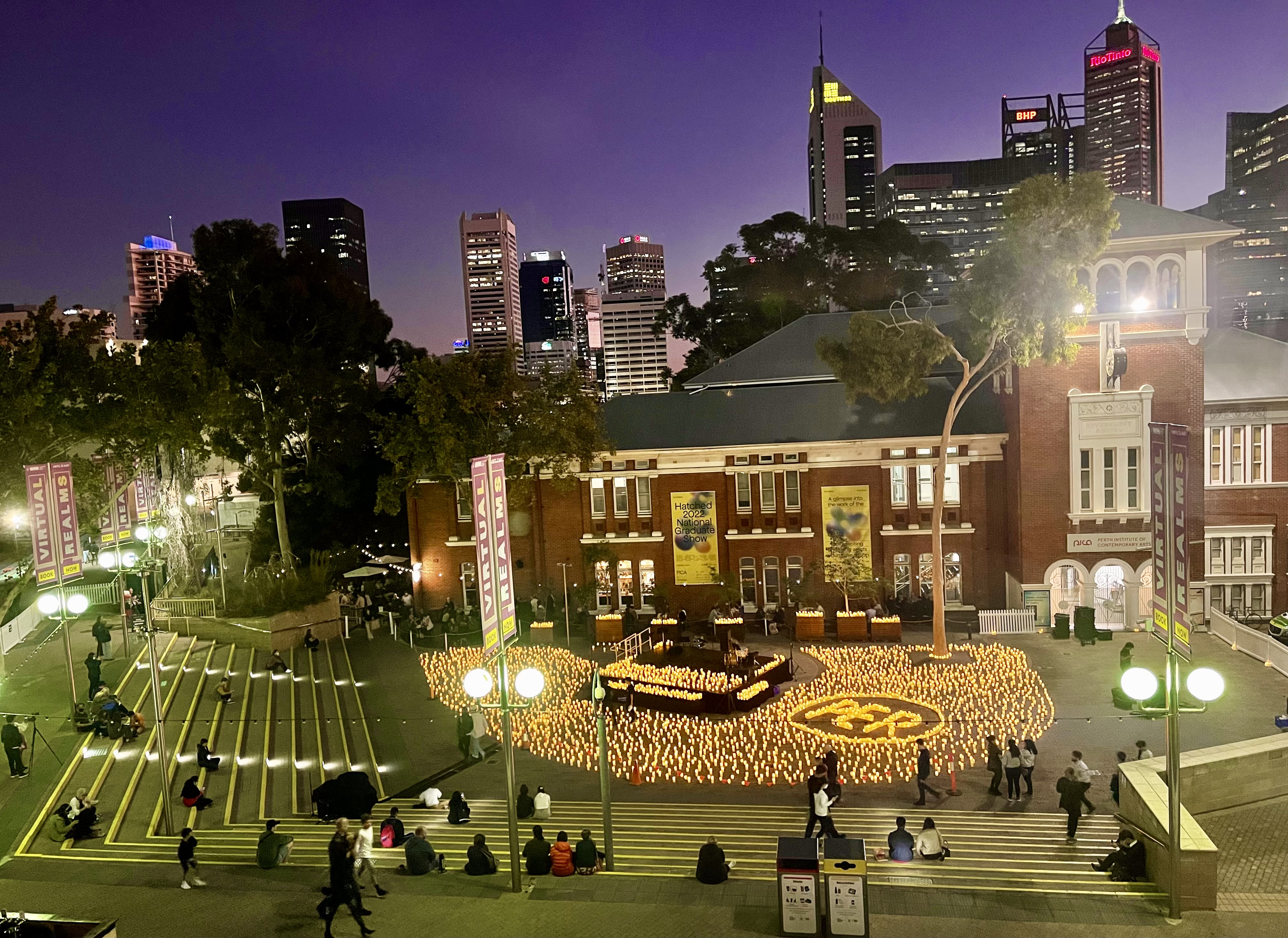
Perth Institute of Contemporary Arts (PICA)

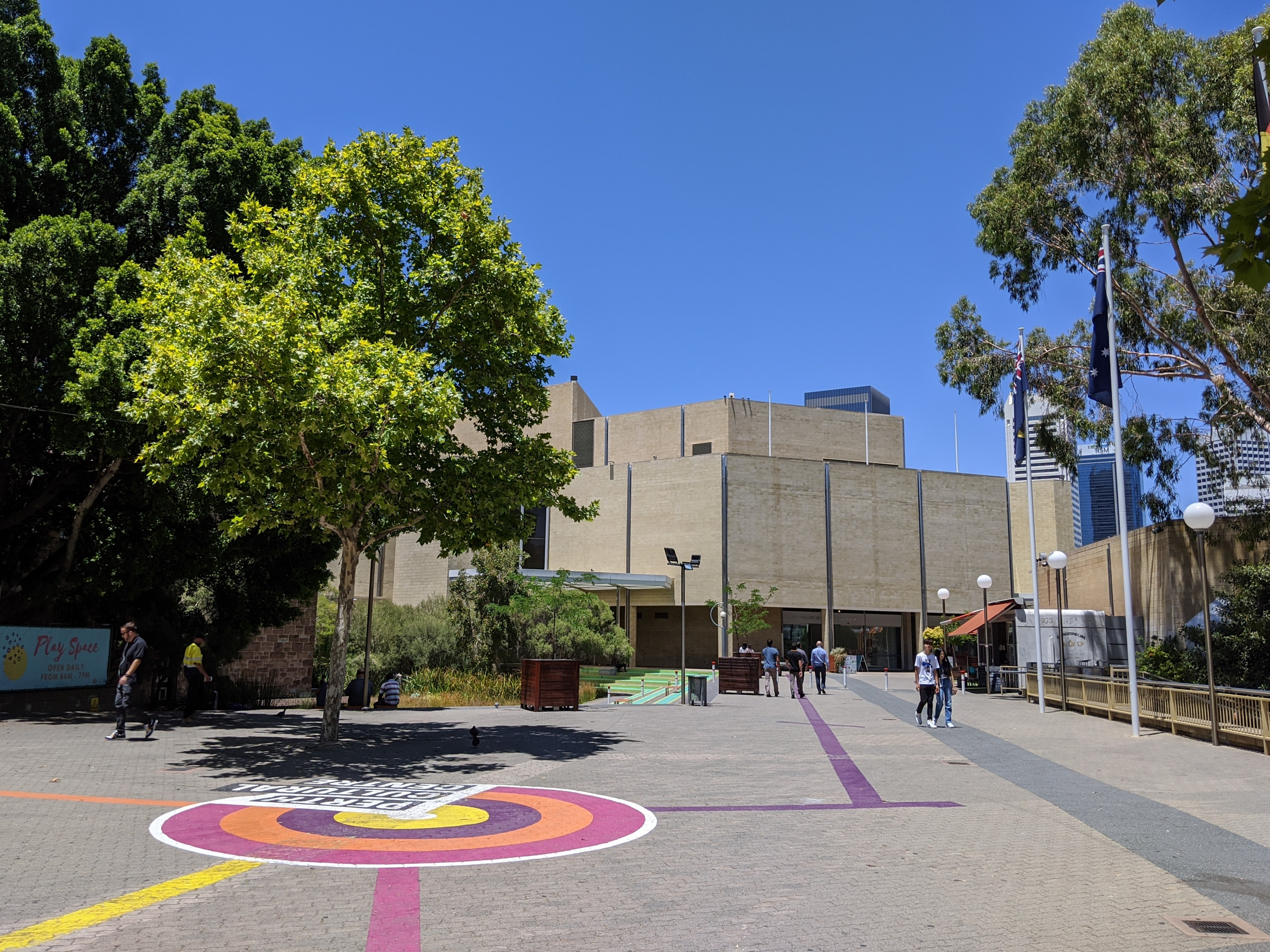
Art Gallery of Western Australia

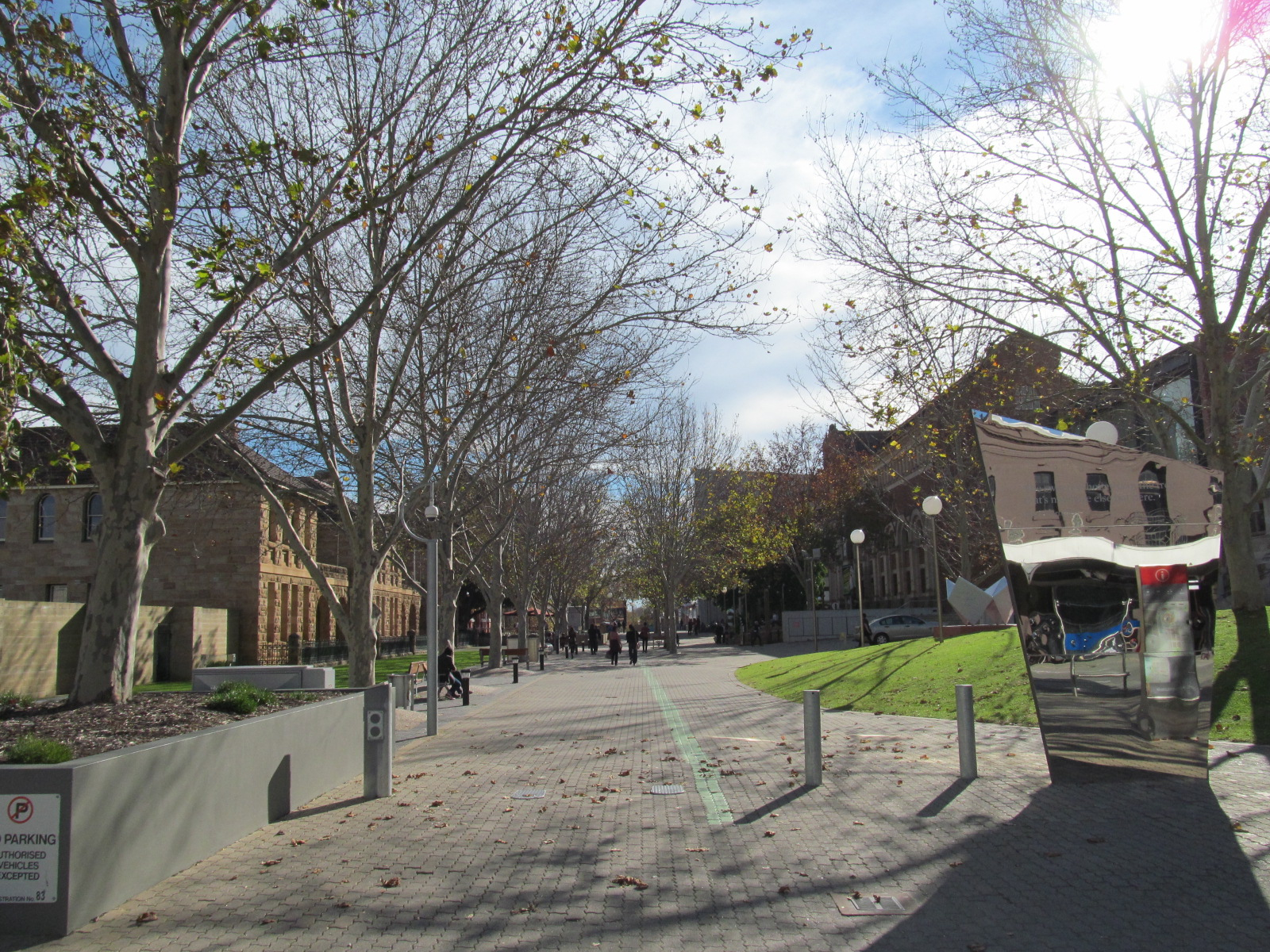
Entering precinct from Beaufort Street at east

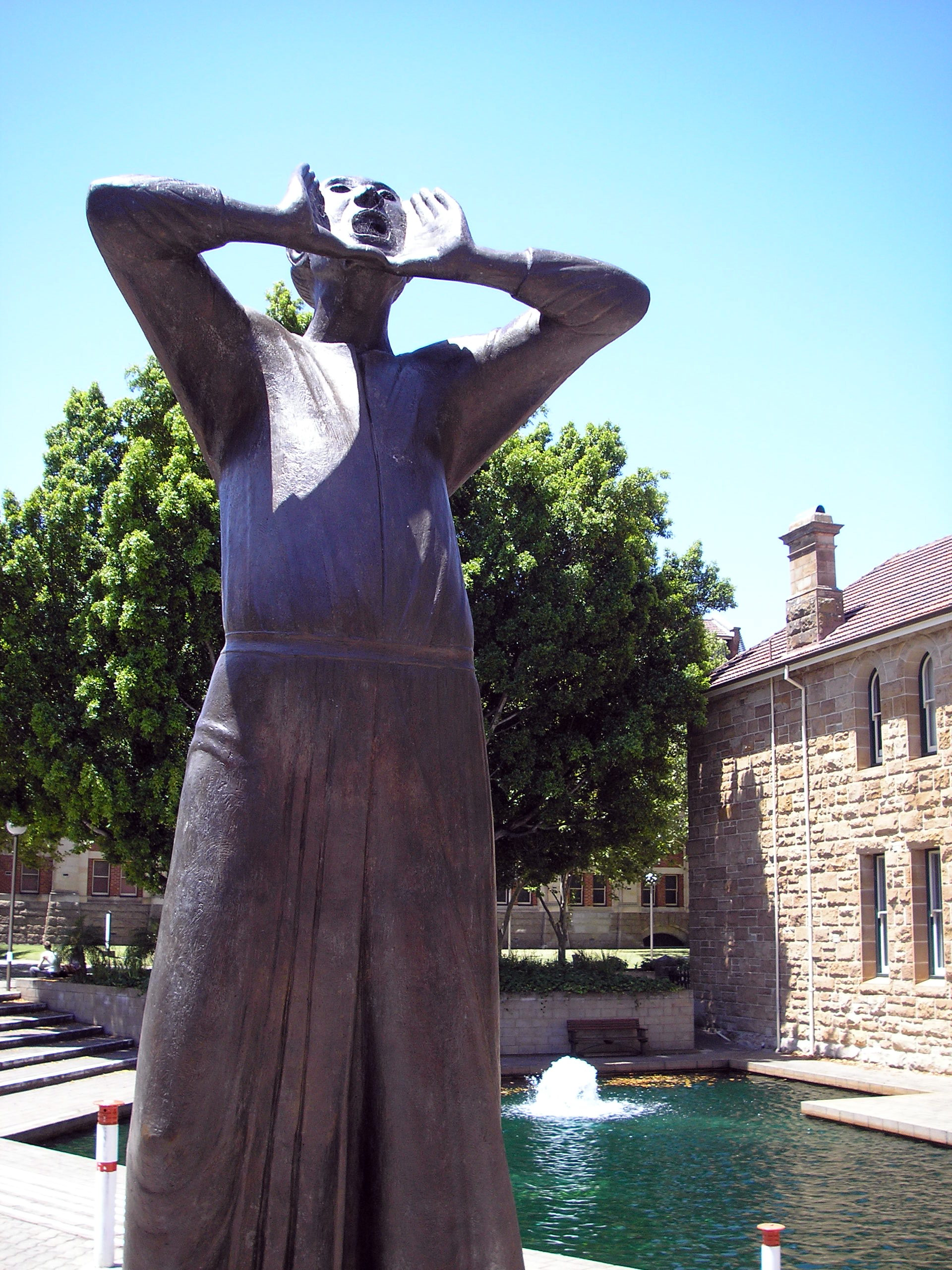
Der Rufer ('the caller', 'the cryer'), a cast of Der Rufer originally commissioned in Germany in 1966

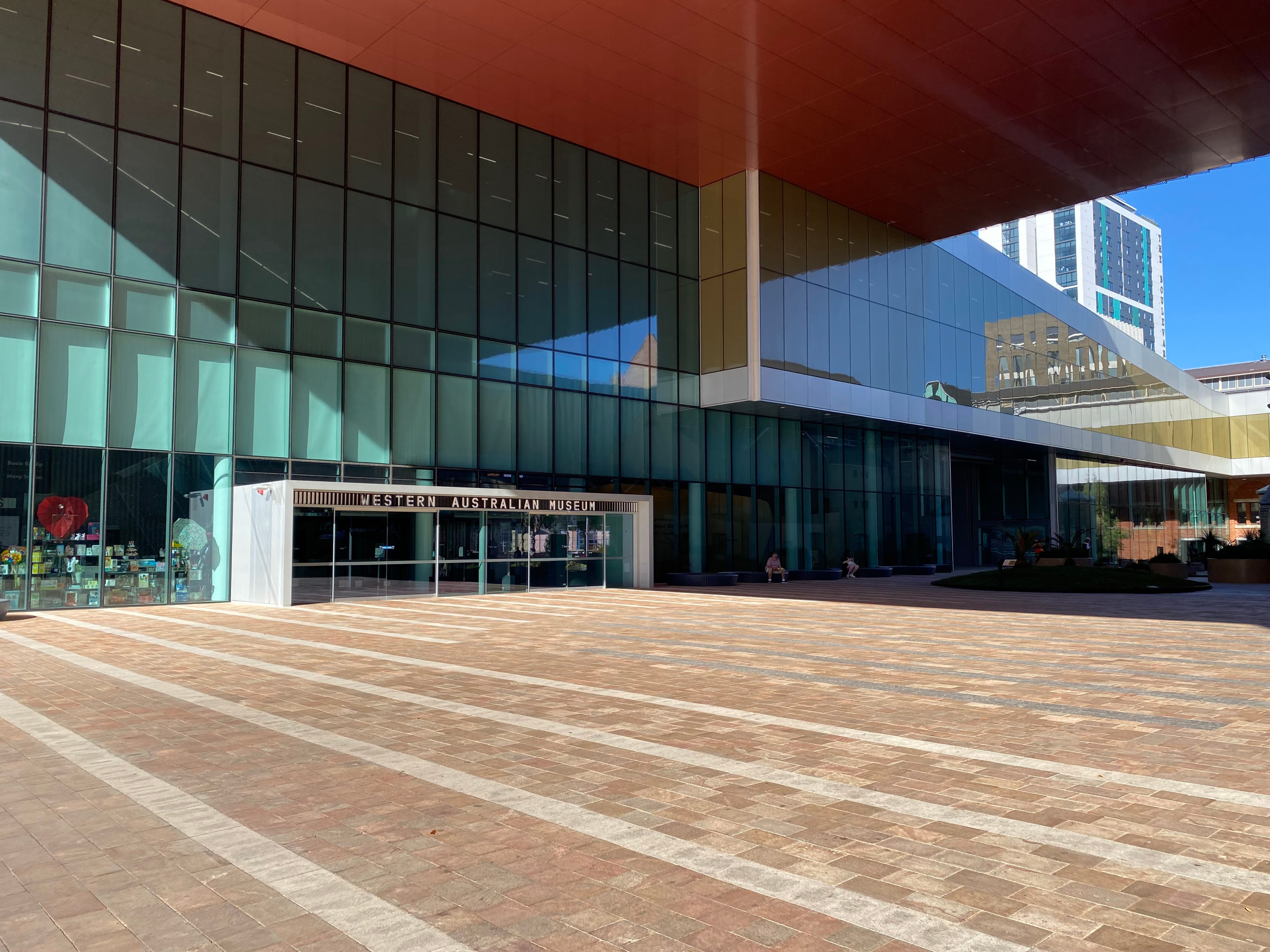
Boola Bardip

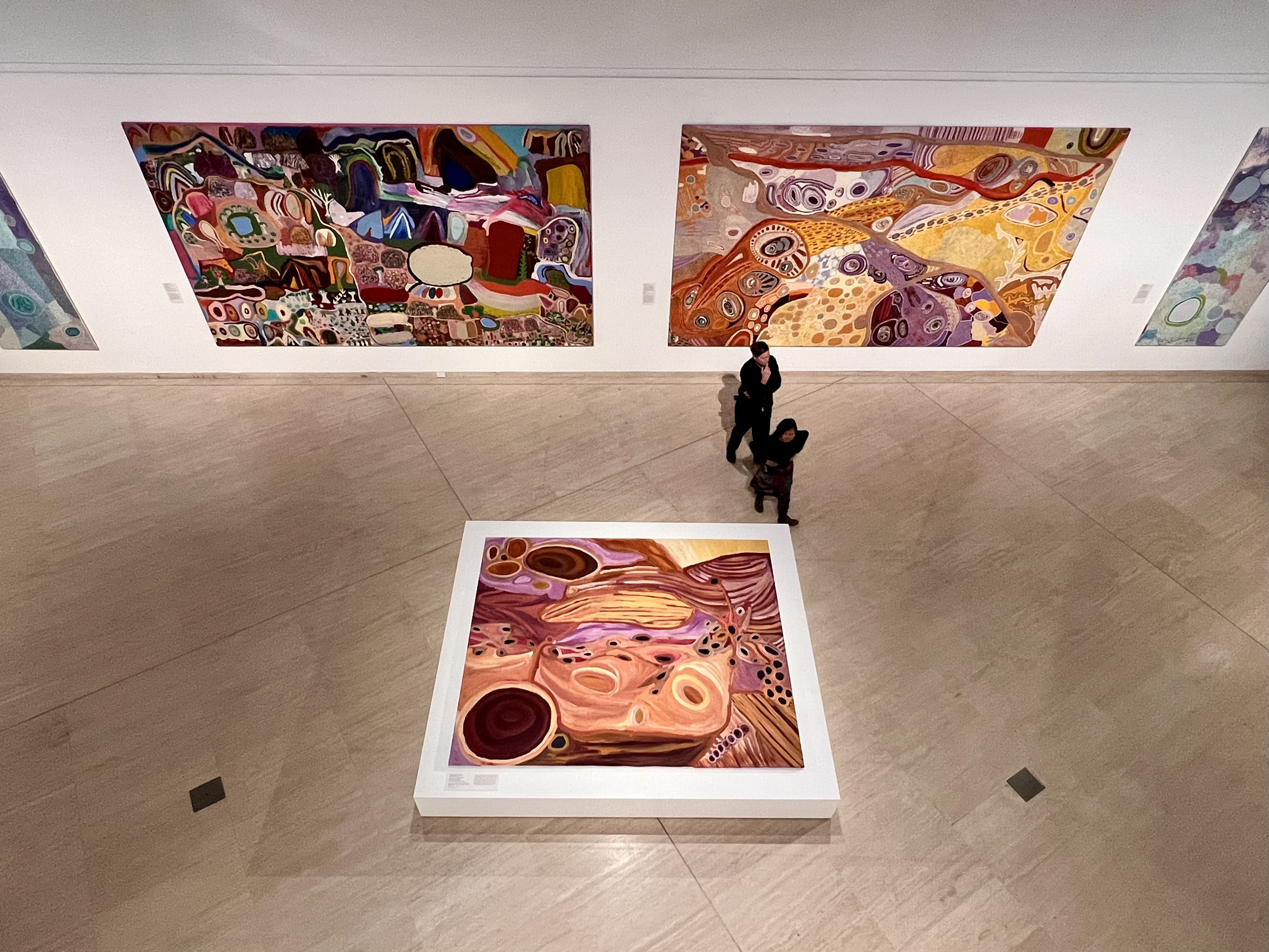
Inside Art Gallery of Western Australia

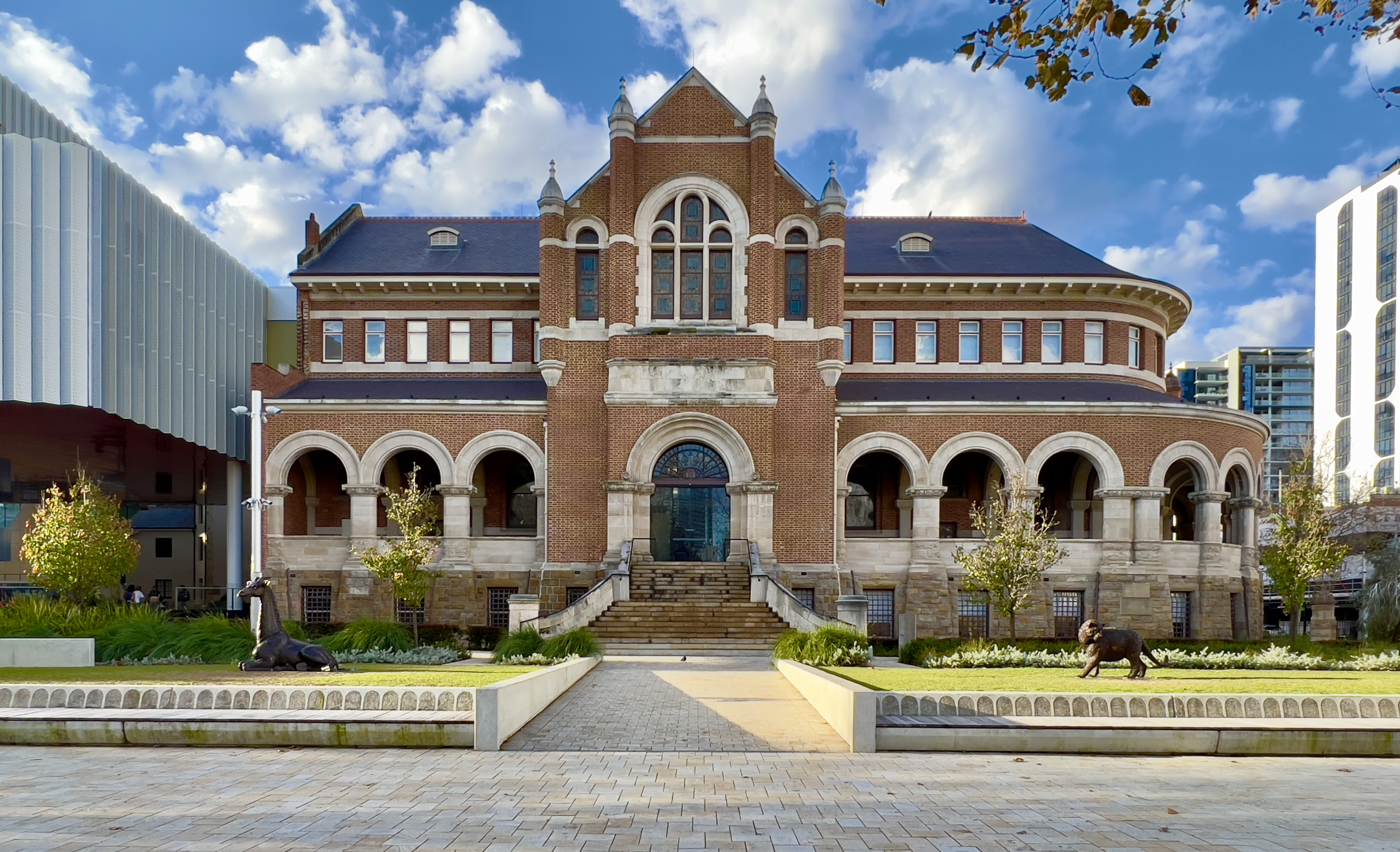
Jubilee Building

== See also ==
- Picabar, connected to the Perth Institute of Contemporary Arts
