= Pavoraja arenaria =

Sandy skate

Conservation status
- Data Deficient (IUCN 3.1)

Scientific classification
- Kingdom: Animalia
- Phylum: Chordata
- Class: Chondrichthyes
- Subclass: Elasmobranchii
- Order: Rajiformes
- Family: Arhynchobatidae
- Genus: Pavoraja
- Species: P. arenaria

Binomial name
- Pavoraja arenaria Last, Mallick and Yearsley, 2008

Species of fish

Pavoraja arenaria, commonly known as the sandy skate or yellow skate, is a species of fish in the family Arhynchobatidae. It lives in depths ranging from 192 to 712 metres but is usually found at 300 to 400 metres depth off the coast of western Australia. Its maximum size is 34.3 cm (13.5 in) total length. It is a little-known species that could be threatened by being taken as by-catch in trawl fisheries.
