= List of convict ship voyages to Western Australia =

Between 1842 and 1849, 234 juvenile offenders were transported to the Colony of Western Australia on seven convict ships. From 1850 to 1868, over 9,000 convicts were transported to the colony on 43 convict ship voyages. Western Australia was designated a penal colony in 1850.

== Voyages transporting Parkhurst apprentices to Western Australia ==
Parkhurst apprentices were juvenile prisoners from Parkhurst Prison, sentenced to "transportation beyond the seas," but pardoned on arrival at their destination on the conditions that they be "apprenticed" to local employers, and that they not return to England during the original term of their sentence. Between 1842 and 1849, Western Australia accepted 234 Parkhurst apprentices, all males aged between 10 and 21. As Western Australia was not yet a penal colony, contemporary documents generally avoided referring to the prisoners as "convicts," and the ships that transported them were not officially recognised as convict ships in the colony. English records, however, classified the seven ships that transported Parkhurst apprentices to Western Australia as convict ships.

This is a list of convict ship voyages that transported Parkhurst apprentices to Western Australia.

Ship	Arrival	Number of Parkhurst apprentices
Simon Taylor	August 1842	18
Shepherd	October 1843	28
Halifax	December 1844	18
Cumberland	January 1846	16
Orient	March 1848	51
Ameer	February 1849	50
Mary	October 1849	53

== Voyages transporting convicts to Western Australia ==
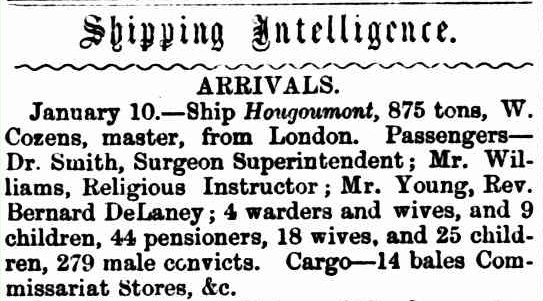
News clipping from the Perth Gazette and West Australian Times, 17 January 1868, announcing the arrival of Hougoumont in Fremantle

This is a list of convict ship voyages that transported convicts to Western Australia during its time as a penal colony between 1850 and 1868.

Ship	Origin	Arrival	Number of convicts
Scindian	Portsmouth	1 June 1850	75
Hashemy	Portland	25 October 1850	100
Mermaid	Portsmouth	13 May 1851	208
Pyrenees	Torbay	28 June 1851	293
Minden	Plymouth	14 October 1851	301
Marion	Portland	2 November 1851	279
William Jardine	Plymouth	1 August 1852	212
Dudbrook	Plymouth	7 February 1853	228
Pyrenees	Torbay	30 April 1853	293
Robert Small	London	19 August 1853	303
Phoebe Dunbar	Kingstown	30 August 1853	285
General Godwin	Calcutta	28 March 1854	15
Sea Park	London	5 April 1854	304
Ramillies	London	7 August 1854	277
Guide	Calcutta	9 January 1855	6
Stag	London	23 May 1855	224
Adelaide	Portland	18 July 1855	259
William Hammond	Plymouth	29 March 1856	249
Runnymede	Plymouth	7 September 1856	248
Clara	London	3 July 1857	262
City of Palaces	Singapore	8 August 1857	4
Nile	Plymouth	1 January 1858	270
Caducius	Bombay	5 February 1858	1
Lord Raglan	Plymouth	1 June 1858	268
Albuera	Calcutta	28 October 1858	11
Edwin Fox	Plymouth	20 November 1858	280
Sultana	Plymouth	19 August 1859	224
Frances	Madras	19 November 1859	1
Palmerston	Portland	11 February 1861	293
Lincelles	Portland	28 January 1862	304
Norwood	Portland	9 June 1862	290
York	Portland	31 December 1862	299
Merchantman	London	14 February 1863	191
Clyde	Portland	29 May 1863	320
Lord Dalhousie	Portland	28 December 1863	270
Clara	London	13 April 1864	301
Merchantman	Portland	12 September 1864	257
Racehorse	Portland	10 August 1865	278
Vimeira	Portland	22 December 1865	278
Belgravia	Portland	4 July 1866	276
Corona	Portland	22 December 1866	305
Norwood	Portland	13 July 1867	253
Hougoumont	London	9 January 1868	279

== See also ==
- Convict era of Western Australia
- Convict ships to New South Wales
- Convict ships to Norfolk Island
