= Guide (ship) =

Guide was a convict ship that transported six convicts from Calcutta, India to Fremantle, Western Australia in 1855. It arrived in Fremantle on 9 January 1855. The six convicts were all soldiers who had been convicted by court-martial and sentenced to transportation. In addition to the convicts, there were 16 passengers on board.

== List of convicts on the Guide ==
Name	Date of birth	Trial place	Trial date	Crime	Sentence
Thomas Clements (aka Claymounts)	1818	Bombay	1854	Insubordination (Navy)	7 years
Thomas Coe	1827	Unknown	Unknown	Unknown	Unknown
Isaac Geldert	1820	Unknown	1854	Insubordination (Navy)	7 years
Thomas Pacey	1827	Unknown	26 April 1853	Murder	Life
Edwin Pearce	1833	Bombay	1854	Insubordination (Army)	7 years
Jonathan Taylor	1831	Liverpool	1850	Burglary	20 years

== See also ==
- List of convict ship voyages to Western Australia
- Convict era of Western Australia
