= City of Palaces (ship) =

City of Palaces was a convict ship that transported four convicts from Singapore to Fremantle, Western Australia, in 1857. It arrived in Fremantle on 8 August 1857. The four convicts were all soldiers and sailors who had been convicted by court-martial in India, and sentenced to transportation. Other than the four convicts, there were no passengers on board.

== List of convicts on the City of Palaces ==
Name	Date of birth	Trial place	Trial date	Crime	Sentence
Thomas Cullen	1841	Bombay	2 September 1856	Striking a sergeant	14 years
John McCartney	1829	Karachi	26 April 1856	Assault and rape	Life, commuted to 7 years
Moses McConnell	1834	Poonah	22 November 1856	Throwing his cap at a lieutenant colonel	7 years
John Nash	1831	Bombay	7 August 1856	Insubordination and mutinous conduct	14 years

== See also ==
- List of convict ship voyages to Western Australia
- Convict era of Western Australia
- List of ship launches in 1854
- List of shipwrecks in January 1860
