= Frances (1859 convict ship) =

History
- Name: Frances

General characteristics
- Propulsion: Sail

Frances was a convict ship that transported a single convict from Madras, India to Fremantle, Western Australia in 1859. The convict, Patrick McDonald or McDonnell, was a soldier convicted of an "unnatural crime" by court-martial at Rangoon, and sentenced to fourteen years' transportation. There were no pensioner guards on the ship but 13 civilian passengers made the voyage — W. Bickley, W. H. Mulve, J. Head, P. Kelly, H. Kearning, M. Shea, J. Lynch, J. Thomas, W. Hurkun, L. Deholme, M. Hopkins, E. Egan, and A. Mahoney.

== See also ==
- List of convict ship voyages to Western Australia
- Convict era of Western Australia
