= Edwin Fox =

Sailing ship

Coordinates: 41°17′6″S 174°0′24″E

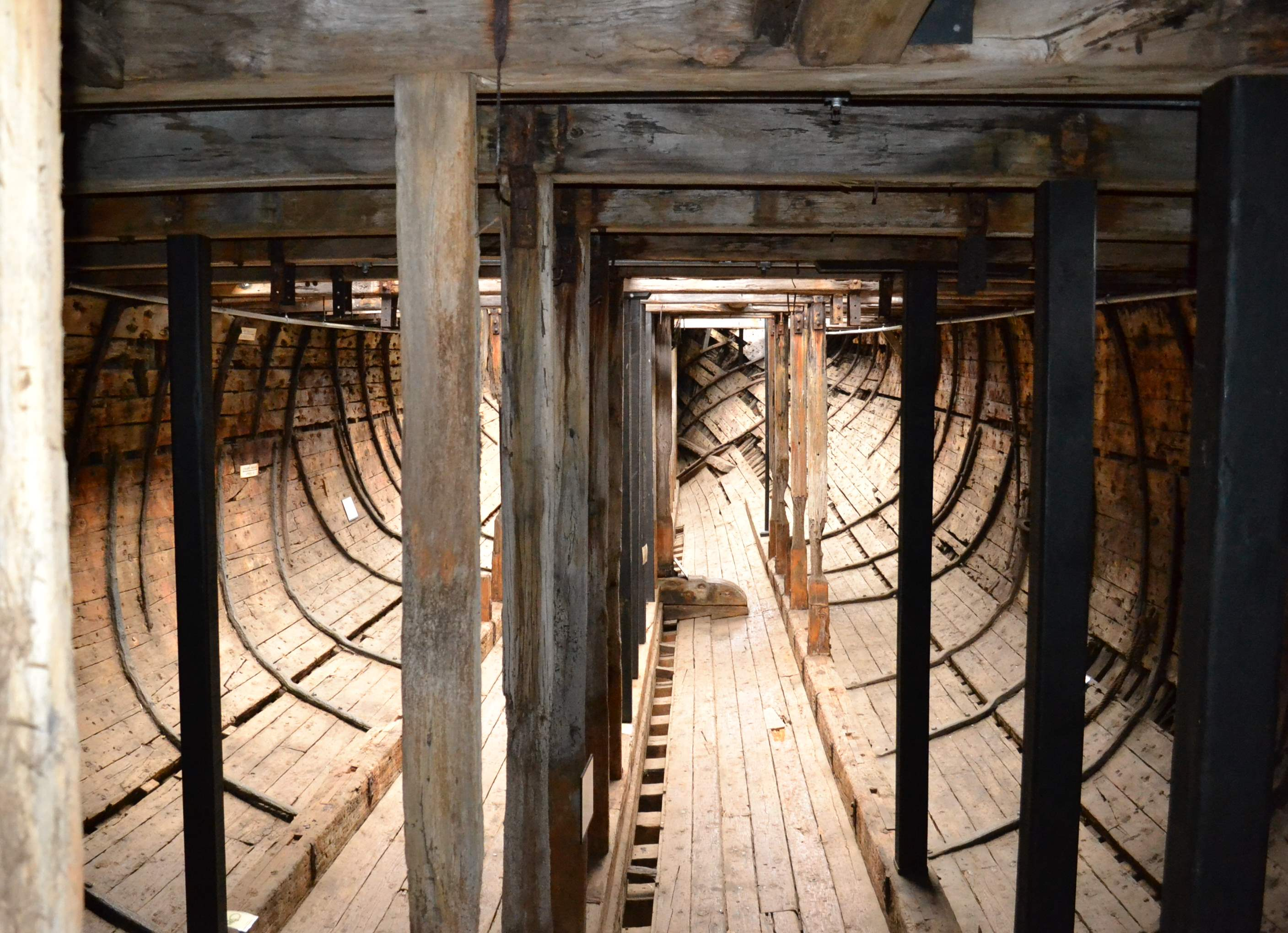
- Interior of hull of Edwin Fox, on display at Picton, New Zealand

History

New Zealand
- Name: Edwin Fox
- Owner: Thomas Reeves, Calcutta (1853), Sir George Hodgkinson, London (1853-4), Duncan Dunbar, London (1854-62), Gellatly Hankey & Co, London (1862-73), Shaw Savill, London (1873-85), Shaw Savill & Albion, London (c 1885-1900), New Zealand Refrigeration Co Ltd, Christchurch (c 1900-1965), Edwin Fox Restoration Society (c 1965-1975); Edwin Fox Society, Picton (1981- )
- Port of registry: Southampton
- Builder: William Henry Foster, Calcutta
- In service: 1853; Hulked, 1885
- Out of service: 1950
- Fate: Sold, 1965
- Status: Museum ship

General characteristics (as built)
- Type: East Indiaman
- Tons burthen: 836 (bm)
- Length: 157 ft (47.9 m) o/a
- Beam: 29 ft 8 in (9.0 m)
- Draught: 23 ft 6 in (7.2 m)
- Sail plan: Full-rigged ship

Edwin Fox is one of the world's oldest surviving merchant sailing ships. (Note: Built 1849. The American whaler Charles W. Morgan, built in 1841, is arguably the oldest surviving merchant ship.) The Edwin Fox is also the only surviving ship that transported convicts to Australia. She is unique in that she is the "only intact hull of a wooden deep water sailing ship built to British specifications surviving in the world outside the Falkland Islands". Edwin Fox carried settlers to both Australia and New Zealand and carried troops in the Crimean War. The ship is dry-docked at The Edwin Fox Maritime Centre at Picton in New Zealand.

== Early history ==
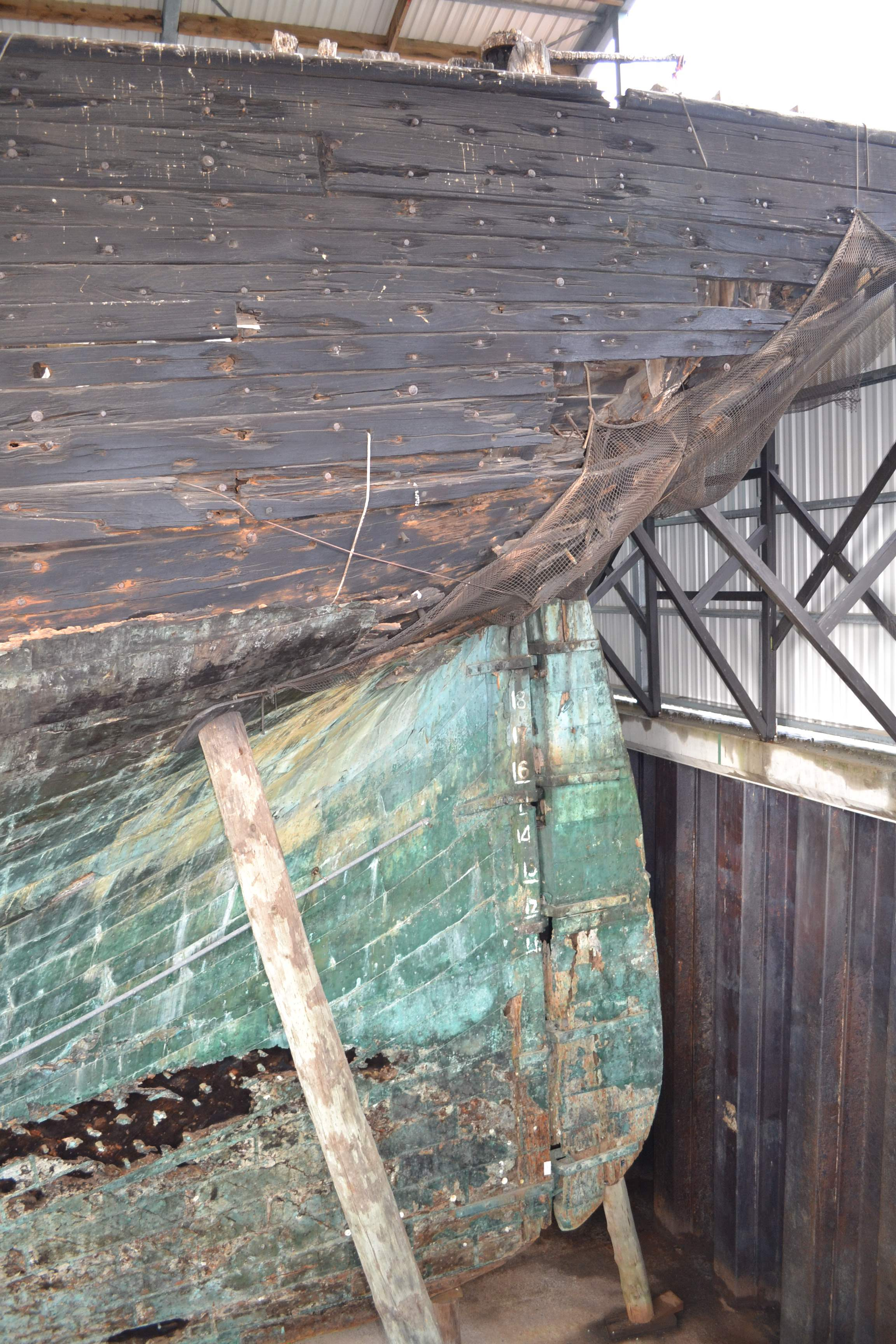
Stern of Edwin Fox, showing existing copper plating

She was built of teak in Calcutta in 1853 and her maiden voyage was to London via the Cape of Good Hope. She then went into service in the Crimean War as a troop ship, and later carrying passengers and cargo.

On 14 February 1856 she began her first voyage to Melbourne, Australia, carrying passengers, then moved to trading between Chinese ports. In 1858 she was chartered by the British Government as a convict ship bound for Fremantle, Western Australia.

== Emigrant ship ==
In 1867 she was converted from a full-rigged ship to a barque, and from 1873 served on the emigrant route to New Zealand, making four voyages carrying a total of 751 settlers to the distant new colony. Conditions on board for the three-month voyage were harsh and luggage strictly limited, and several voyagers did not survive to see their new home. On arrival they often found conditions much harsher than expected, and were also faced with being cut off from family and friends in distant Europe, sometimes for life.

== Lamb and coal ==
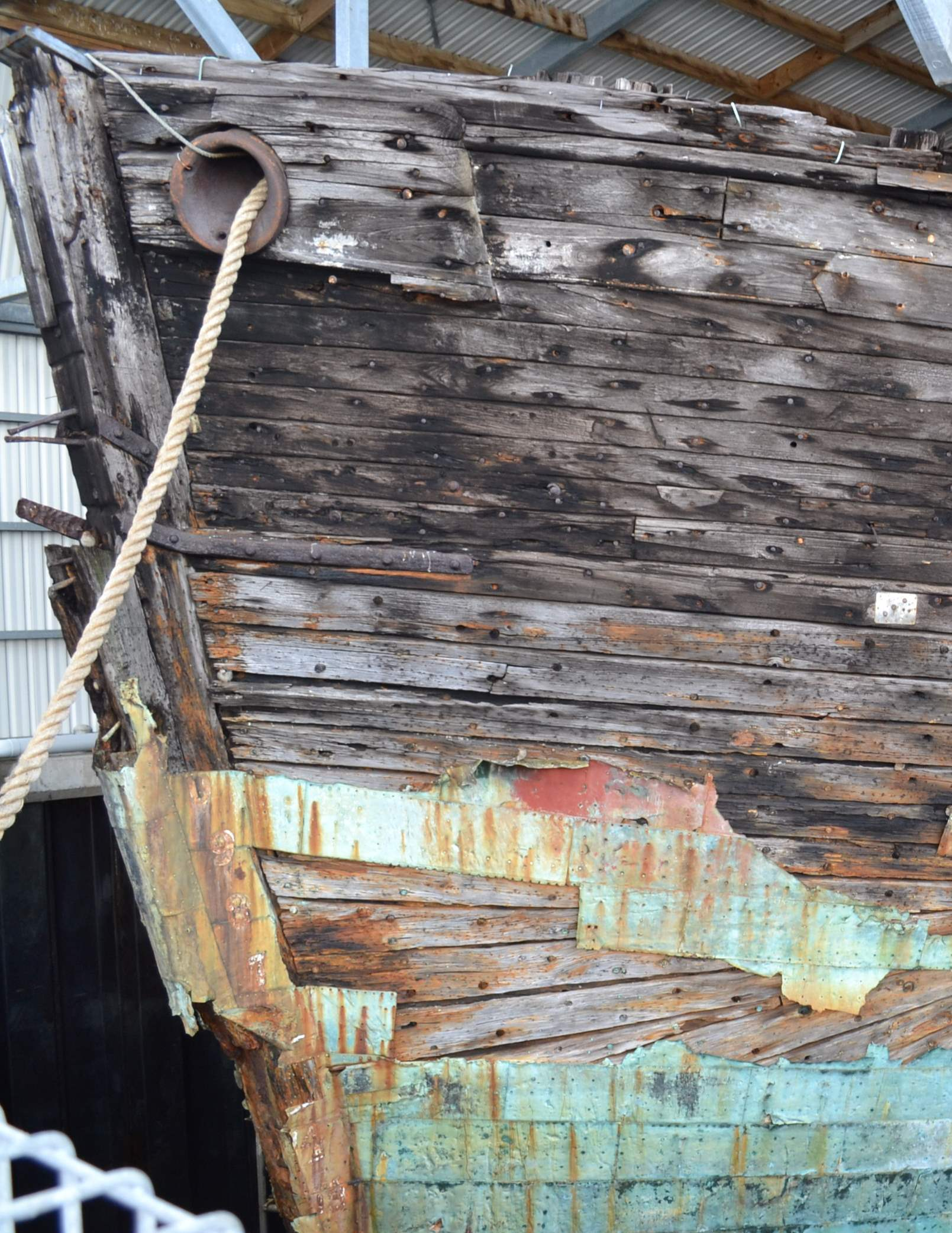
Detail of bow showing remaining copper plating

Edwin Fox was overtaken by the age of steam, and in the 1880s she was refitted as a floating freezer hulk for the booming sheep industry in New Zealand. She was towed to Picton in the South Island on 12 January 1897 where she initially continued as a freezer ship, before being further dismantled in 1905 when converted into a coal store hulk. By this time she had long since lost her rigging and masts, and suffered holes cut in her sides and the removal of most fittings. The ship was in use until 1950, then abandoned to rot at her berth.

== Preservation ==
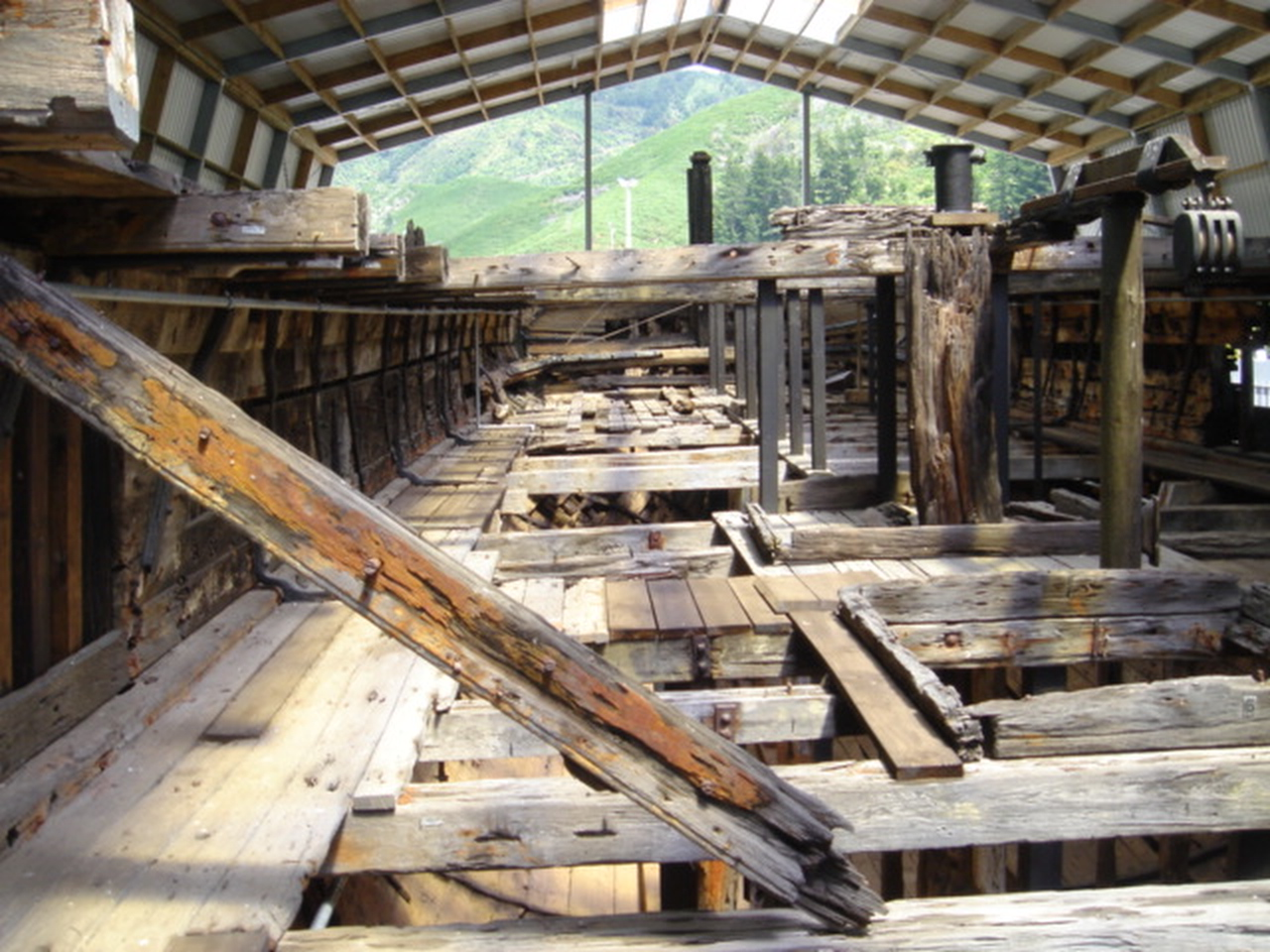
Lower deck of Edwin Fox. The upper deck no longer exists.

In 1965 she was bought by the Edwin Fox Society for the nominal sum of one shilling. In 1967 she was towed to Shakespeare Bay where she remained for the next 19 years. In 1986, after much further fundraising the ship was refloated and towed to her final home, a dry dock on the Picton waterfront. She was floated in and the dock was drained to begin preservation. In 2013 the Edwin Fox Society's preservation project received a World Ship Trust Award, the last of its kind to be officially given out due to the winding up of the World Ship Trust, based in London.

Initially, it was planned to restore the ship completely, replacing rigging and refurbishing the interior. It was decided that this was not practical, not only for reasons of finance but because the timbers required are no longer easily available. She is thus preserved as a hull with an adjacent informative museum. Visitors are able to access two of her decks.

The ship and museum were taken over by the newly formed Marlborough Heritage Trust (supported by the local council) in 2015 in order to help safeguard her for future generations.

A book, Teak and Tide, was released in 2014.

In 2015 Neil Oliver and the BBC show Coast filmed the story of the ship for the New Zealand edition of the show.

3D scanning of the ship took place in 2016. This work recorded the hull to within 1mm of its actual size and shape. It is hoped that a virtual restoration of the ship can be achieved at some point.

Between 2016 and 2021, the ship was recorded as part of a wider nautical archaeological study into late-eighteenth to mid-nineteenth century British colonial-built vessels.

The Edwin Fox Museum and Ship are now owned by Marlborough District Council.

Edwin Fox has been given category I registration by Heritage New Zealand.

== See also ==
- Thomas Bushell, a convict transported on Edwin Fox
- Convict era of Western Australia
- List of convict ship voyages to Western Australia
- List of museum ships

== Citations ==
=== References ===
- Costley, Nigel (2014). Teak and Tide: The ebbs and eddies of the Edwin Fox - from the Ganges to Picton, New Zealand - the changing fortunes of the last surviving 19th century merchantman. Nelson: Nikau Press. ISBN 9780958289856.
- Boyd Cothran, Adrian Schubert: The Edwin Fox. How an Ordinary Sailing Ship Connected the World in the Age of Globalisation, 1850-1914. The University Press of North Carolina, Chapel Hill 2023, ISBN 9781469676579.
