= William Hammond (ship) =

Convict ship

History
- Owner: Thomas and Co

General characteristics
- Length: 149 ft 6 in (45.6 m)
- Beam: 28.6 ft (8.7 m)
- Draft: 19 ft (5.8 m)
- Sail plan: Barque
- Complement: 32

William Hammond was a barque used to transport convicts to Western Australia.

Built in Sunderland in 1853 for Thomas and Co, William Hammond was 149.5 feet (45.6 m) long, 28.6 feet (8.7 m) wide and 19 feet (5.8 m) deep, and had a burden of 683 tons. On 30 September 1853, she sailed on her maiden voyage from Plymouth to Adelaide, South Australia, with 271 emigrating passengers on board. She docked in Adelaide on the 19th January 1854 after a journey of 89 days during which four children died.

When appointed to transport convicts to Western Australia in 1855, William Hammond was still considered a new ship, and had an A1 rating. With Horatio Edwards as captain and George MacLaren as surgeon-superintendent, William Hammond embarked 35 convicts from the Woolwich prison hulk Defence on 6 December 1855, and another 32 convicts from the hulk Warrior shortly afterwards. On 8 December she was towed out of Woolwich dock and sailed down the River Thames. After clearing the Straits of Dover she encountered stormy weather in the English Channel. She sailed along the south coast of England, docking at Portsmouth. On 17 December she took on 59 more convicts, and the following day she anchored off the Isle of Portland, where it took on 80 convicts from Portland Prison. William Hammond left Portland on 24 December, but shortly afterwards a sailor named John Gollately fell overboard while trying to stow the jib. Another sailor, John Deady, attacked the Chief Mate, David Kid, saying it was his fault the man fell overboard. William Hammond then set in at Plymouth, where Deady was tried before a magistrate and sentenced to 21 days imprisonment. Six sailors who, due to various illness were deemed unfit to travel, were also disembarked. After taking on 45 more convicts from Dartmoor Prison, William Hammond sailed for Western Australia on 5 January 1856.

William Hammond sailed with 32 crew, 250 convicts and 98 passengers, most of whom were pensioner guards and their families. She sailed directly to Fremantle, a journey that took 84 days. Only one person died on the journey, a corporal in the pensioner guard named Henry Fraser, probably of tuberculosis. No convicts died, although there were reported cases of dysentery, diarrhoea and nyctalopia. The only other incident occurred on 28 January, when Kid was found to be drunk on his watch, having accessed the stores of rum without permission.

At about 7 pm on 28 March, William Hammond sighted the lighthouse on Rottnest Island. Anchor was dropped in the lee of Rottnest early the next morning, and at 7 am the Fremantle harbourmaster boarded the ship. The passengers were disembarked by mid-afternoon, and the convicts were disembarked over the next two days.

Little is known of the William Hammond's subsequent service, except that there is a record of her delivering immigrants to Melbourne in 1862.

== See also ==
Convicts transported on board William Hammond include:

- William Boxhal
- William Jones
- John Cage 1833-1904 Arrived Western Australia 29 March 1856
- List of convict ship voyages to Western Australia

== General references ==
- Peachey, Brian (2000). Unbroken Spirit: The Life of William Boxhal Convict 3744. Victoria Park, Western Australia: Hesperian Press. ISBN 0-85905-275-3.
- "William Hammond – arrived in WA in 1856". Convicts to Australia.
