= City of Palaces =

City of Palaces may refer to:

== Places with the nickname ==
- Luxor, Egypt
- Halisahar, West Bengal, India, so-called in the 13th century
- Kapurthala, Punjab, India
- Kolkata, West Bengal, India, because of the British Raj buildings in the 19th century
- Mysore, Karnataka, India
- Valletta, Malta, as described by Benjamin Disraeli
- Vollenhove, Netherlands, in the 17th century
- Bahawalpur, Punjab, Pakistan
- Mexico City, described by Alexander von Humboldt as La ciudad de los palacios

== Literature ==
- La ciudad de los palacios ('The city of palaces'), a 1990 book by Guillermo Tovar y de Teresa
- The City of Palaces, a 2015 novel by Michael Nava
- The Sleeping Dictionary, released in India as The City of Palaces, a 2013 novel by Sujata Massey
- The City of Palaces, a collection of poems, an 1824 work by James Atkinson using the epithet for Calcutta

== Other uses ==
- City of Palaces (ship), convict ship to Western Australia in 1857
