= Albuera (1854 ship) =

History

United Kingdom
- Name: Albuera
- Namesake: Battle of Albuera
- Builder: 729 tons (bm; old) or 852 tons (bm; new), launched at Moulmein (Burma) in 1854.
- Launched: 1854
- Fate: Last listed 1881

General characteristics
- Tonnage: 774 GRT
- Tons burthen: Old Act: 729 (bm); New Act (post 1836): 852 (bm)
- Length: 165 ft (50.3 m)
- Beam: 31 ft (9.4 m)
- Depth: 21 ft (6.4 m)

Albuera was launched at Moulmain (British Burma), in 1854. She made three voyages to Adelaide between 1854 and 1874. In 1858 she transported eleven convicts from Calcutta, India to Fremantle, Western Australia, arriving on 28 October 1858. The eleven convicts were all soldiers and sailors who had been convicted by court-martial in India, and sentenced to transportation. There were no other passengers on board. She was last listed in 1881.

== List of convicts on the Albuera ==
Name	Date of birth	Trial place	Trial date	Crime	Sentence
William Barr	1818	Tonghoo	1856	Insubordination	14 years
Edward Connor	1826	Rangoon	1857	Desertion	14 years
Joseph Deffin	1830	Secunderabad	1856	Striking a superior officer	Life
James Furlong	1826	Thayat	1856	Breach of articles of war	14 years
Thomas Harrison	1827	Rangoon	1857	Desertion	14 years
William Howard	1824	Kamptin	1854	Theft and desertion	14 years
Thomas Mahoney	1825	Umballah	1855	Attempted murder	14 years
James Mallon	1824	Kamptin	1854	Theft and desertion	14 years
James McGrath	1827	Rangoon	1857	Desertion	14 years
Denis McInerney	1824	Rangoon	1857	Desertion and stealing	14 years
Peter Pruntree (aka Pruntee)	1825	Rangoon	1857	Desertion	14 years

== See also ==
- List of convict ship voyages to Western Australia
- Convict era of Western Australia
