= Runnymede (ship) =

Several ships have been named Runnymede (or Runymede, or Runneymede), for Runnymede:

- Runnymede (1825 ship) was a barque–rigged sailing ship built in London. She traded between Britain and India, sailing under a license from he British East India Company (EIC). She made one voyage to Tasmania in 1839–1840 transporting convicts. She also carried immigrants to New South Wales. She was wrecked in 1844.
- Runnymede (1849) , of 248 tons (bm), was built in Hobart, Tasmania. She spent her career as a whaling ship. As such, she made 27 whaling voyages between 1849 and 1881. In 1881, she ran aground during a storm. She was stripped, refloated, and became a coal hulk. She was later burnt.
- Runnymede (1854 ship) at Sunderland, England. In 1856 she made her first voyage from London to Australia, transporting convicts to Western Australia. She was wrecked in 1866.
