= General Godwin =

General Godwin was a convict ship that transported fifteen convicts from Calcutta, India to Fremantle, Western Australia in 1854. It arrived in Fremantle on 28 March 1854. The fifteen convicts were all soldiers who had been convicted by court-martial and sentenced to transportation. In addition to the convicts, there were thirteen passengers on board.

== List of convicts on the General Godwin ==
Name	Date of birth	Trial place	Trial year	Crime	Sentence
Samuel Baskerfield	1828	Bombay	1852	Breach of articles of war	14 years
William Brown	1820	Umballah	1852	Striking superior officer	14 years
Anthony Cain	1830	Bombay	1852	Breach of articles of war	14 years
John Caldwell	1826	Bangalore	1852	Theft of equipment	7 years
Charles Delaney	1820	Bombay	1853	Breach of articles of war	14 years
John Duffy	1814	Bombay	1851	Wounding with intent	Life
John Dugleby	1824	Meerut	1853	Stealing equipment	14 years
John Foley	1831	Dinapore	1852	Attempted murder	Life
John Foran	1828	St Thomas	1853	Drunk & insubordination	14 years
John Gill	1824	Dinapore	1854	Destroying his regiment's equipment	Life
Thomas Hale	1824	Umballah	1852	Striking superior officer while drunk	Life
Michael Hogan	1821	Madras	1853	Insubordinate conduct	14 years
Francis Lonson (aka Linson, Louson, Lousone)	1821	Bombay, India	1853	Forgery	7 years
John McCullagh	1829	Bombay	1853	Breach of articles of war	10 years
James Terry	1826	Bombay	1854	Breach of articles of war	7 years

== See also ==
- List of convict ship voyages to Western Australia
- Convict era of Western Australia
