= General Godwin (disambiguation) =

General Godwin was an Australian convict transport ship. General Godwin may also refer to:

- Abraham Godwin (1763–1835), U.S. Army brigadier general
- Archibald C. Godwin (1831–1864), Confederate States Army brigadier general
- Charles Godwin (1873–1951), British Indian Army lieutenant general
- Henry Godwin (Army officer) (1784–1853), British Army major general

== See also ==
- Alfred Reade Godwin-Austen (1889–1963), British Army general
- Godwin Abbe (born 1949), Nigerian Army major general
