= Convict assignment =

Penal labour practice

Convict assignment was the practice used in many penal colonies of assigning convicts to work for private individuals. Contemporary abolitionists characterised the practice as virtual slavery, and some, but by no means all, latter-day historians have agreed with this assessment.

In Australia, every penal colony except Western Australia had a system of convict assignment. Convicts in Western Australia were never assigned, with the debatable exception of the Parkhurst apprentices.

The system was abolished in New South Wales and Van Diemen's Land on 1 July 1841 and replaced with the probation gang system. After working for two years in a labour gang, if they were well-behaved, convicts received 'probation passages' which meant they could work for wages.

== See also ==
- Convict lease
- Ticket of leave § Australia
