= Swan River mania =

Swan River mania refers to the period of high immigration to the Swan River Colony in Western Australia due in large part to exaggerated claims in the British press of riches to be found in the "land of promise"

The media hype only lasted between 1829 and 1830 when the first mail ship arrived back detailing the hardships of life in the colony, this bad press stemmed the flow of emigration for many years until the forced migration of convicts in 1850 and the Western Australian gold rush in the 1890s.
