= William Boxhal =

William Boxhal (c. 12 February 1832 – 12 January 1893) was an English convict transported to colonial Western Australia. He later became a farmer in the Victoria Plains district, and was one of the first such farmers to secure land in the area.

William Boxhal was born in Godalming, Surrey, and baptised on 12 February 1832. As a child, he moved with his family several times; they were in Camberwell, London in 1839, Croydon, Surrey in 1841, and Deptford in 1846. These movements probably indicate that Boxhal's father had difficulty securing employment. In July 1846, Boxhal's father died, and William Boxhal became responsible for feeding his family. He eventually went to Preston, Lancashire, an industrial port with more opportunities for work. Late, he joined the 50th Regiment of the British Army.

On 23 August 1852, Boxhal and another soldier of the 50th Regiment named John Jones were charged with burglary. According to their arraignment, they

at Fulwood in a shop of one Arthur Phipps Rudman did feloniously break and enter and light pieces of paper of the value of one penny... and in the said shop... by force of arms did steal, take and carry away sixty one pounds in money.

The pair were also charged with a virtually identical burglary of a shop belonging to a George Worthington. The two men were found guilty in October, and sentenced to ten years' penal transportation.

Boxhal would have been lodged at first in the Preston jail, then later sent to Millbank Prison to serve his mandatory period of solitary confinement. In September 1853 he was transferred to the Woolwich prison hulk Defence, where he was set to work at the Woolwich Arsenal. Boxhal remained at Woolwich until December 1855, when he was placed on board William Hammond for transportation to Western Australia. William Hammond left London on 8 December, taking on more convicts at Portsmouth and Portland and later stopping at Plymouth before finally sailing for Western Australia on 5 January 1856. It arrived at Fremantle, Western Australia on 28 March 1856.

William Boxhal was issued with a ticket of leave within a week of arrival at Fremantle. He was probably then sent to the Toodyay convict depot, as by January the following year he was working as a shepherd for Dom Rosendo Salvado. A number of extant contracts between Salvado and Boxhal indicate that Boxhal worked for Salvado for a number of years. In May 1862 Boxhal and another convict named Charles Delaney were contracted to construct fencing, and later to clear ground; in April 1863 he was contracted as a bullock teamster; and in August he was contracted as a sheep shearer.

On 4 May 1863, William Boxhal married Mary Ann Kelly, the daughter of an Irish pensioner guard. He then began establishing himself as a farmer. Initially, he squatted or leased an area of land south of New Norcia in partnership with an ex-convict named Owen Lavin. In 1866, the two men secured joint title to a 16-hectare (40-acre) lot on the road to Guildford, becoming virtually the first farmers to secure land in the area. Boxhal sunk a well and built a house for his wife. The first of nine children was born in June 1864.

In 1870, Boxhal bought a 4.0-hectare (10-acre) lot on the northern boundary of his land. Later, he bought another 40 hectares (100 acres). He was sufficiently successful that between 1868 and 1872 he employed 11 ticket-of-leavers men. He continued to increase his land holding, and in 1884 he leased 1,200 hectares (3,000 acres) of farmland surrounding his freehold land.

Mary Ann Boxhal died on 3 February 1887. Some time after this, Boxhal moved to a rented house in Guildford. In January 1892, he sold all his freehold land to a Victoria Plains farmer named John Woods. Later that year he was diagnosed with cancer. Leaving his home in Guildford, he travelled to Berkshire Valley north east of New Norcia, to visit one of his sons. He died there on 12 January 1893, and was buried in New Norcia cemetery.

== General references ==
- Peachey, Brian (2000). Unbroken Spirit: The Life of William Boxhal Convict 3744. Victoria Park, Western Australia: Hesperian Press. ISBN 0-85905-275-3.
