= Simon Taylor (ship) =

History

United Kingdom
- Name: Simon Taylor
- Owner: Meek and Co. (1824–); S. Taylor (–1837); R. Taylor (1837–c.1839); Thomson and Co. (c.1839–)
- Builder: Blackwall Yard, London
- Launched: 1824
- Fate: Wrecked 7 June 1849

General characteristics
- Tons burthen: 431 (bm)
- Length: 140 ft (43 m) (passenger deck)
- Depth: 7 ft 6 in (2.3 m) (between decks)
- Sail plan: barque

Simon Taylor was a barque built in 1824 on the River Thames that transported assisted migrants to Western Australia.

On completion, Simon Taylor was registered to S. Taylor. Between 1829 and 1837, Simon Taylor made a number of voyages to Jamaica; a voyage to Mauritius in 1833 is also recorded. Records indicate that the ship's captain in 1830 was a Mr. Christie. In 1837 ownership of Simon Taylor was transferred to R. Taylor, and over the next two years she was restored. Once restored, she was transferred to Thomson and Co. In 1840 she made a voyage under a Captain whose name is recorded as Mr. Slater. From 1841 the Captain was Thomas Brown.

From 1841 to 1846, Simon Taylor made a number of voyages to Bombay, India.

In the early 1840s, John Hutt, Governor of Western Australia, sent £3500 to the Land and Emigration Commission in Britain to provide assisted passage for migrants to bolster the workforce in the new colony.

Simon Taylor departed from London on 30 April 1842 and docked at Fremantle, Western Australia on 20 August. (Lloyd's Register listed her as bound for Bombay however). Two hundred and forty-two passengers disembarked, of which 219 were assisted migrants to Western Australia, and a further 18 were Parkhurst apprentices – these were juvenile criminals from the Isle of Wight who were transported to Western Australia but pardoned on arrival on the condition that they take up an apprenticeship with a local settler. The Parkhurst apprentices were arguably the first convicts transported to Western Australia, although the colony would not become an official penal colony until 1850.

From 1847 to 1849 Simon Taylor made a number of voyages to Calcutta.

== Fate ==
On 7 June 1849 she was returning from Jamaica when she was driven ashore on shingles off the south coast of England, and broke up. There are no further records of the ship after that date.

== See also ==
- List of convict ship voyages to Western Australia
