= Parkhurst apprentices =

British juvenile delinquents deported to Australia and New Zealand

The Parkhurst apprentices, juveniles from a reformatory attached to Parkhurst Prison on the Isle of Wight, were sentenced to "transportation beyond the seas" and transported to Australia and New Zealand between 1842 and 1852. Either before leaving England or on arrival at their destination, they were pardoned on the conditions that they be "apprenticed" to local employers, and that they not return to England during the term of their sentence. In the ten years between 1842 and 1852 nearly 1500 boys aged from twelve to eighteen were transported to Australia and New Zealand from Parkhurst Prison.

== Parkhurst apprentices in Western Australia ==
Early in 1839, Governor of Western Australia John Hutt received from the Colonial Office a circular asking if the colony would be prepared to accept juvenile prisoners who had first been reformed in "penitentiaries especially adapted for the purpose of their education and reformation". After seeking comment from the Western Australian Agricultural Society, Hutt responded that "The Majority of the Community would not object to boys not above 15 years of age...." but that the labour market could not support more than 30 boys per year.

Between 1842 and 1849, Western Australia accepted 234 Parkhurst apprentices, all males aged between 10 and 21 years. As Western Australia was not then a penal colony, contemporary documents scrupulously avoided referring to the youths as "convicts", and most historians have maintained the distinction. An opposing view, held for example by Gill (2004), is that the Parkhurst apprentices were convicts, and that their apprenticeship constituted convict assignment.

John Schoales jun. (c. 1810 – 10 April 1847), son of John Schoales QC of Dublin. was appointed Guardian of the apprentices. He determined the allowance they were paid, holding it in trust until their 5-year indenture period was over. The Parkhurst Visitors insisted that names of the boys not be published in the Government Gazette, in order that they were not discriminated against. Schoales was succeeded as Guardian by Frederick Dirck Wittenoom (c. 1821–1863).

Parkhurst apprentices were employed by a broad cross-section of Western Australia's businessmen and officials, including many of the colony's ruling class. Among the long list of Parkhurst apprentice employers were Governor Andrew Clarke, Frederick Irwin, George Fletcher Moore, Anthony O'Grady Lefroy, William Locke Brockman, Thomas Brown, George Walpole Leake, Walter Padbury, Stephen Stanley Parker, Rosendo Salvado Thomas Peel JR and George Shenton Sr.

The assimilation of Parkhurst apprentices played an important role in the later acceptance of convicts in Western Australia.

== New Zealand ==
One hundred and twenty three Parkhurst apprentices were sent to the Colony of New Zealand in 1842 and 1843. These had not been invited to the convict-free colony, and were a great surprise when the first ship arrived. After the second ship, the colony successfully petitioned that no more would be sent.

== South Australia ==
The Colony of South Australia was also asked to accept Parkhurst Boys, but resisted and none was sent there.

== List of ships ==
List of ships that brought Parkhurst apprentices to Australia and New Zealand

Ship	Arrival	Parkhurst apprentices	Colony
Simon Taylor	August 1842	18	Western Australia
St George	November 1842	92	New Zealand
Shepherd	October 1843	28	Western Australia
Mandarin	October 1843	51	Tasmania
Mandarin	November 1843	31	New Zealand
Halifax	December 1844	18	Western Australia
Strathedin	December 1845	74	Tasmania
Cumberland	January 1846	16	Western Australia
Maitland	October 1846	70	Victoria
Thomas Arbuthnot	May 1847	89	Victoria
Joseph Somes	September 1847	84	Victoria
Marion	January 1848	125	Victoria
Orient	March 1848	51	Western Australia
Eden	February 1849	62	Victoria
Ameer	February 1849	50	Western Australia
Hashemy	abt July 1849	29	Tasmania
Randolph	August 1849	85	Victoria
Mary	October 1849	53	Western Australia
Adelaide	November 1849	30	Tasmania
Blenheim	July 1850	85	Tasmania
Maria Somes	August 1850	30	Tasmania
Nile	October 1850	30	Tasmania
Rodney	November 1850	40	Tasmania
Mermaid	May 1851	43	Western Australia
Lady Kennaway	May 1851		Tasmania and Norfolk Island
Pyrenees	June 1851	29	Western Australia
Minden	October 1851	30	Western Australia
Aboukir	December 1851		Tasmania
Fairlie	March 1852	30	Tasmania
Equestrian	August 1852		Tasmania
Oriental Queen	October 1852		Tasmania
Dudbrook	February 1853	1	Western Australia
Lincelles	January 1862	1	Western Australia
