= Runnymede (1854 ship) =

History

United Kingdom
- Name: Runnymede
- Launched: 1854
- Fate: Wrecked 2 February 1866

General characteristics
- Tons burthen: 720 (bm)
- Length: 156 ft (48 m) (passenger deck)
- Beam: 29 ft 6 in (9.0 m)
- Draught: 13 ft 3 in (4.0 m)
- Depth: 19 ft 6 in (5.9 m) (between decks)
- Sail plan: Ship-rigged
- Notes: Three masts

Runnymede was built in 1854 at Sunderland, England. In 1856 she made her first voyage from London to Australia, transporting convicts to Western Australia. She was wrecked in 1866.

== Career ==
Runnymede first appeared in Lloyd's Register (LR) in 1854.

Year	Master	Owner	Trade	Homeport	Source & notes
1855	Burrows	Brass & Co.	Sunderland–East Indies	Bristol	LR
1856	Burrows	Brass & Co.	London–Australia	London	LR

Convict voyage (1856): Runnymede, William Burrows, master, sailed from Plymouth on 15 June 1856 and arrived at Fremantle, Swan River Colony, on 7 September. she was the 17th convict ship to arrive there. She carried 248 male convicts, 30 guards with their 19 wives, 18 sons and 22 daughters. There were no deaths among the convicts on the voyage.

Year	Master	Owner	Trade	Homeport	Source & notes
1858	Burrows	Brass & Co.	London	London	LR
1861	T.Rickeby	Brass & Co.	London	London	LR
1864	T.Rickeby; J.Little	Brass & Co. T.Lewis	London–Australia	London	LR; small repairs 1864

== Fate ==
In 1866, Runnymede was carrying wool and copper ore between Wallaroo, South Australia and Tasmania to Swansea, Wales. She sprang a leak off Cape Leeuwin, continued on towards Mauritius, and eventually sank near Klippen Point off Eastern Cape, South Africa. The entry for her in LR for 1865 carries the annotation "Wrecked".

== See also ==
- List of convict ship voyages to Western Australia
