= List of shipwrecks in January 1860 =

The list of shipwrecks in January 1860 includes ships sunk, foundered, wrecked, grounded, or otherwise lost during January 1860.

== 1 January ==
List of shipwrecks: 1 January 1860
Ship	State	Description
Arethusa	United Kingdom	The ship was driven ashore and wrecked at Bannow, County Wexford with the loss of a crew member. She was on a voyage from "Zaza", Cuba to Queenstown, County Cork.
Augusta	Bremen	The brig was wrecked in the Caicos Passage. She was on a voyage from Haiti to Liverpool, Lancashire, United Kingdom.
Douglas	United Kingdom	The brig ran aground on the Whiting Sand, in the North Sea off the coast of Suffolk and sank. Her crew were rescued. She was on a voyage from West Hartlepool, County Durham to London.
Francis	United Kingdom	The ship departed from Ceará, Spain for Liverpool. No further trace, presumed foundered with the loss of all hands.
Greyhound	United Kingdom	The barque ran aground on the Assiban Shoals, in the Atlantic Ocean off the coast of Georgia, United States.
Lady Rebow	United Kingdom	The ship was driven ashore at Kilmore, County Wexford. Her crew were rescued. She was on a voyage from São Miguel Island, Azores to Liverpool.
Mentor	United Kingdom	The ship ran aground on the Brake Sand, in the Thames Estuary. She was on a voyage from London to Africa. She was refloated and put in to Ramsgate, Kent in a leaky condition.
Nusser Sultan	India	The barque was wrecked on Rodrigues. She was on a voyage from Calcutta to Mauritius.
Royal City	United Kingdom	The ship was run ashore and wrecked on the north coast of Bintan Island, Netherlands East Indies. She was on a voyage from Sarawak, Malaya to Singapore, Straits Settlements and London.
Royal Lily	United Kingdom	The barque was wrecked on the coast of Brittany, France. Her seventeen crew survived. She was on a voyage from Singapore, Straits Settlements to London.

== 2 January ==
List of shipwrecks: 2 January 1860
Ship	State	Description
Aveireuse	Portugal	The schooner was wrecked at Plymouth, Devon, United Kingdom. She was on a voyage from Liverpool, Lancashire to Aveiro.
Chase	United Kingdom	The barque was run ashore at Glin, County Limerick, She was on a voyage from Limerick to Cardiff, Glamorgan. She was later refloated and put back to Limerick.
Mary Hall	United Kingdom	The ship struck rocks at Teignmouth, Devon and was damaged. She was on a voyage from Colombo, Ceylon to London. She was taken in to Teignmouth in a leaky condition.
Mary Stewart	United Kingdom	The barque was wrecked on the Hogsty Reef. Her fourteen crew were rescued. She was on a voyage from Jérémie, Haiti to Plymouth, Devon.
Pietro	Austrian Empire	The brig was run into and sunk by the steamship Cumberland (United Kingdom) at Dublin, United Kingdom. She was on a voyage from Cork to Milford Haven, Pembrokeshire, United Kingdom.

== 3 January ==
List of shipwrecks: 3 January 1860
Ship	State	Description
Genova	Sweden–Norway	The brig was abandoned off Gijón, Spain. She was on a voyage from Constantinople, Ottoman Empire to Queenstown, County Cork, United Kingdom. She was taken in to Gijón the next day in a leaky condition.
Mary Howe	United Kingdom	The snow foundered 90 nautical miles (170 km) south by west of The Lizard, Cornwall. Her nine crew were rescued by Lotus (Portugal. Mary Howe was on a voyage from Sunderland, County Durham to Garrucha, Spain.
William Pirrie	United Kingdom	The barque was wrecked near Concarneau, Finistère, France. Her sixteen crew were rescued. She was on a voyage from Hull, Yorkshire to Bahia, Brazil.

== 4 January ==
List of shipwrecks: 4 January 1860
Ship	State	Description
Hora	United Kingdom	The brig was driven ashore at Sea Palling, Norfolk. She was on a voyage from Sunderland, County Durham to Great Yarmouth, Norfolk. She had become a wreck by 14 January.
Nicholas Curwen	United States	The bark was driven ashore at Ravenglass, Cumberland, United Kingdom. She was on a voyage from New Orleans, Louisiana to Fleetwood, Lancashire, United Kingdom. She was later refloated and towed in to Liverpool, Lancashire by the tug United States (United Kingdom). She arrived on 7 January in a severely leaky condition.
Thecla	Hamburg	The koff was driven ashore on Scharhörn. She was on a voyage from Newcastle upon Tyne, Northumberland, United Kingdom to Hamburg.

== 5 January ==
List of shipwrecks: 5 January 1860
Ship	State	Description
Eliza	United Kingdom	The ship was lost on this date. Her crew were rescued. She was on a voyage from China to Australia.
Islesman	United Kingdom	The steamship sank in the Clyde. She was on a voyage from Glasgow, Renfrewshire to Havre de Grâce, Seine-Inférieure, France.
Vibilia	United Kingdom	The ship was wrecked on the south coast of Belle Île, Morbihan, France. Her eleven crew survived. She was on a voyage from Newcastle upon Tyne, Northumberland to A Coruña, Spain.

== 6 January ==
List of shipwrecks: 6 January 1860
Ship	State	Description
Ellen	United Kingdom	The ship foundered. Her fourteen crew survived She was on a voyage from South Shields, County Durham to Madras, India.
Fortitude	United Kingdom	The ship was driven ashore and wrecked south of Fraserburgh, Aberdeenshire. Her crew were rescued. She was on a voyage from Easdale, Argyllshire to Dundee, Forfarshire.
John Chapman	United Kingdom	The ship was abandoned in the North Sea. Her crew were rescued. She was on a voyage from Scalloway, Shetland Islands to Leith, Lothian. John Chapman was towed in to Dundee, Forfarshire on 10 January.
John Sugars	United Kingdom	The barque sank 30 nautical miles (56 km) off Cape St. Vincent, Spain (36°28′N 18°15′W). Her sixteen crew were rescued by the steamshirp Nicholas Wood (United Kingdom). John Sugars was on a voyage from London to Adelaide, South Australia. Barratry was alleged as the cause of the sinking.
Marianna	Portugal	The brig was driven ashore and wrecked near Aveiro. Her crew were reported missing. She was on a voyage from São Tomé to Lisbon.
Northerner	United States	Drawing by a survivor of the wreck of Northerner. The paddle steamer struck a submerged rock and was wrecked in the Pacific Ocean off Centerville, Humboldt County, California, a few miles south of the entrance to Humboldt Bay with the loss of 38 lives. Seventy people on board survived.
William Fraser	United Kingdom	The brig ran aground on the Newcombe Sand, in the North Sea off the coast of Suffolk.

== 7 January ==
List of shipwrecks: 7 January 1860
Ship	State	Description
Apame	France	The snow ran aground and sank off the coast of Pas-de-Calais. Her six crew were rescued. She was on a voyage from Newcastle upon Tyne, Northumberland, United Kingdom to Boulogne, Pas-de-Calais.
Calypso	United Kingdom	The brig ran aground at Memel, Prussia. She was on a voyage from Liverpool, Lancashire to Memel. She was refloated and found to be leaky.
Fanny	United Kingdom	The brig was driven ashore on Salt Island, Anglesey. She was on a voyage from Liverpool to Tralee, County Kerry. She was refloated and taken in to Holyhead, Anglesey.
Frau Marie	Flag unknown	The ship was driven ashore at Barber's Point, in the Dardanelles. She was refloated the next day.
Henrietta	Hamburg	The brig ran aground on the Steilsand, in the North Sea. She was on a voyage from Sunderland, County Durham to Hamburg. She was refloated the next day and towed in to Cuxhaven.
J. M. Sigoyne	United Kingdom	The brigantine was abandoned off "Stage Island". She was on a voyage from Saint Martin to Boston, Massachusetts, United States.
Kate Evelyn	United Kingdom	The ship ran aground at Warrenpoint, County Down and was severely damaged. She was refloated on 18 January and towed in to Newry, County Antrim.
Louisa	(United Kingdom of Great Britain and Ireland) Gibraltar	The felucca was driven ashore at Gibraltar.
Mary and Margaret	United Kingdom	The schooner ran aground on the Plough Seat, in the Farne Islands, Northumberland. She was on a voyage from Grangemouth, Stirlingshire to Newcastle upon Tyne. She was refloated and taken in to Berwick upon Tweed, Northumberland in a severely leaky condition.
Rachel	Flag unknown	The felucca was abandoned off Gibraltar.
Sallanot	Spain	The ship departed from Cardiff, Glamorgan, United Kingdom for Cádiz. No further trace, presumed foundered with the loss of all hands.

== 8 January ==
List of shipwrecks: 8 January 1860
Ship	State	Description
Agres	Sweden–Norway	The schooner was driven ashore at Cádiz, Spain.
Albert	France	The felucca was driven ashore on the Spanish coast.
Anna	France	The ship was driven ashore and wrecked at "Torre Nueva", Spain with the loss of four lives.
Anna Maria	United Kingdom	The barque was driven ashore at Safi, Morocco. Her crew were rescued.
Cambria	United Kingdom	The ship was driven ashore at Villaricos, Spain.
Clarissa	United Kingdom	The barque was driven ashore at San Andres, near Cádiz. Her crew were rescued. She was on a voyage from Málaga, Spain to Cardiff, Glamorgan.
Corso	Spain	The polacca was driven ashore at Algeciras.
Diana	Spain	The full-rigged ship was driven ashore at Algeciras.
Diligente	Sardinia	The felucca was driven ashore at Gibraltar.
Divina Pastora	Spain	The felucca was driven ashore at Algeciras with the loss of one life.
Duke of Argyll	United Kingdom	The barque was driven ashore and wrecked at Alicante, Spain with the loss of four of her crew. She was on a voyage from Genoa, Sardinia to South Shields, County Durham.
Elizabeth	United Kingdom	The schooner was driven ashore at Algeciras. She was on a voyage from Málaga, Spain to the Guadiana River.
Iris	Spain	The brig struck the wreck of the steamship Genova ( Sardinia) and was consequently beached at Cádiz. She was on a voyage from Alicante to Cádiz.
Isabel Segunda	Spanish Navy	The frigate was driven ashore and wrecked at Algeciras.
Jaime	Spain	The schooner was driven ashore at Cádiz. All on board were rescued. She was on a voyage from Santa Pola to Almería and Cádiz.
James Gibson	United Kingdom	The brig was abandoned in the Atlantic Ocean with the loss of a crew member. Survivors were rescued by Martha (United Kingdom). James Gibson wa son a voyage from Demerara, British Guiana to Bristol, Gloucestershire.
J. M. Morales	United Kingdom	The ship ran aground at Gibraltar. She was refloated on 10 January.
Joshua Morran	United States	The full-rigged ship was driven into the hulk Emperor and severely damaged at Gibraltar.
Julia	Spain	The schooner was driven ashore at Gibraltar. All on board were rescued. She was on a voyage from Barcelona to Almería and Havana, Cuba.
Kurkhandel	Netherlands	The galiot was driven into the hulk Java (United Kingdom) and severely damaged at Gibraltar.
Louisa	United Kingdom	The felucca was driven ashore and wrecked at Gibraltar.
Monmouth	United States	The barque was driven ashore at Gibraltar. She was on a voyage from Messina, Sicily to Philadelphia, Pennsylvania.
Nuestra Señora de los Angeles	United Kingdom	The ship struck the wreck of the steamship Genova ( Sardinia) and capsized at Cádiz with the loss of five of the seven people on board. Nuestra Señora de los Angeles was on a voyage rom Valencia to Almería and Cádiz. She subsequently came ashore and was wrecked.
Quó dirán do mi	Spain	The schooner was driven ashore and wrecked at Cádiz. Her crew were rescued.
Rosalia	Spanish Navy	The steamship was driven into the steamship Tharsis (Spain) and then wrecked off Castillejos, Morocco. Her crew were rescued.
Saeta	Spain	The guarda costa was driven ashore at Algeciras.
San Ramon	Spain	The ship was driven ashore and wrecked at Gibraltar.
Santa Isabel	Spain	The steamship was driven ashore and wrecked at Algeciras.
Sea Foam	United States	The brig was driven into the hulk Java (United Kingdom) and was severely damaged at Gibraltar.
St. Jean Baptiste	France	The steamship was driven ashore and wrecked at Gibraltar.
Thetis	France	The brig was driven ashore and wrecked at Gibraltar with the loss of one of her crew.
Virgen do los Angeles	Spain	The mistico was driven ashore and wrecked at Gibraltar with the loss of one of her eight crew. Survivors were rescued by HMS Vulture (Royal Navy).
Unnamed	Spain	The felucca was driven ashore and wrecked at Puente Mayorga with the loss of one of her eight crew. Survivors were rescued by Piles (Spanish Navy).

== 9 January ==
List of shipwrecks: 9 January 1860
Ship	State	Description
City of Palaces	United Kingdom	The ship ran aground on the Brake Sand, in the Thames Estuary. She was on a voyage from London to Madras, India. She was refloated and taken in to The Downs.
Clarissa	United Kingdom	The ship was driven ashore and wrecked at Málaga, Spain. Her crew were rescued. She was on a voyage from Málaga to Cardiff, Glamorgan.
Jules César	France	The barque was driven ashore and wrecked at Málaga. Her eighteen crew and 86 passengers were rescued. She was on a voyage from Marseille, Bouches-du-Rhône to Nicaragua.
Mary and Elizabeth	United Kingdom	The ship ran aground at Kurrachee, India.

== 10 January ==
List of shipwrecks: 10 January 1860
Ship	State	Description
Christina	United Kingdom	The steamship was damaged by fire at Liverpool, Lancashire.
Cove	United Kingdom	The brig struck the Filey Brig Rock and sank. Her nine crew were rescued. She was on a voyage from Blyth, Northumberland to Dieppe, Seine-Inférieure, France.
Jessie	(United Kingdom of Great Britain and Ireland) Jersey	The brig was wrecked at "Cape English". Her seven crew survived. She was on a voyage from Paspébiac, Province of Canada, British North America to Jersey.
Ocean Belle	(United Kingdom of Great Britain and Ireland) British North America	The schooner was driven ashore and wrecked at Herring Cove, Nova Scotia.
Sea Bird	United Kingdom	The ship struck the Filey Brig Rock and sank. Her crew were rescued. She was on a voyage from South Shields, County Durham to London.
William Kirk	United Kingdom	The full-rigged ship was wrecked in the Torres Straits. Her 21 crew survived. She was on a voyage from Newcastle, New South Wales to Galle, Ceylon.

== 11 January ==
List of shipwrecks: 11 January 1860
Ship	State	Description
Nieuwe Rotterdamsche Gasfabrick	Netherlands	The ship was driven ashore on the Dutch coast. She was on a voyage from Rotterdam, South Holland to Newcastle upon Tyne, Northumberland, United Kingdom. She was refloated and resumed her voyage.

== 12 January ==
List of shipwrecks: 12 January 1860
Ship	State	Description
Gleaner	United Kingdom	The sloop was driven ashore and wrecked at Kirkcaldy, Fife. She was on a voyage from Newcastle upon Tyne, Northumberland to West Wemyss, Fife.
Good Intent	United Kingdom	The ship collided with a galiot and sank in the Humber. Her crew were rescued. She was on a voyage from Hull to Selby, Yorkshire.
Louisa Amelia	United Kingdom	The full-rigged ship was wrecked at Coringa, India.
South Carolina	United States	The sidewheel paddle steamer burned at Apalachicola, Florida.

== 13 January ==
List of shipwrecks: 13 January 1860
Ship	State	Description
Cossack	United Kingdom	The steamship was driven ashore at Margam, Glamorgan. She was on a voyage from Liverpool, Lancashire to Cardiff, Glamorgan.
Elizabeth and Ann	United Kingdom	The full-rigged ship was lost near Batavia, Netherlands East Indies. Her fourteen crew survived. She was on a voyage from Foo Chow Foo, China to Melbourne, Victoria.
Lord Mulgrave	United Kingdom	The brig ran aground on the Sheringham Shoal, in the North Sea off the coast of Norfolk, and sank. Her crew were rescued by the brig Nautilus (United Kingdom). Lord Mulgrave was on a voyage from Seaham, County Durham to London.
Niagara	United Kingdom	The barque was wrecked on the Mull of Kintyre, Argyllshire. All eighteen people on board were rescued. She was on a voyage from London to Glasgow, Renfrewshire.

== 14 January ==
List of shipwrecks: 14 January 1860
Ship	State	Description
Alma	United Kingdom	The schooner was driven ashore in Sanda Sound. She was on a voyage from a Welsh port to the Clyde.
Amelia	United States	The full-rigged ship ran aground on the Crab Bank, in the Atlantic Ocean off the coast of South Carolina. She was on a voyage from Charleston, South Carolina to Liverpool, Lancashire, Kent, United Kingdom.
Brothers	United Kingdom	The schooner was wrecked at Cefn Sidan, Pembrokeshire. Her crew survived. She was on a voyage from Cardiff, Glamorgan to Waterford.
Catharine	United Kingdom	The schooner was driven ashore and wrecked at Rattray Head, Aberdeenshire. Her crew were rescued. She was on a voyage from Newcastle upon Tyne, Northumberland to Bonar Bridge, Sutherland.
Daniel	Belgium	The schooner ran aground on the Goodwin Sands, United Kingdom. She was refloated with the assistance of a tug and taken in tow for Ramsgate but consequently sank. Her crew were rescued. She was on a voyage from Antwerp to Liverpool.
Eliza Kirkbride	United Kingdom	The ship ran aground on the Sheringham Shoal, in the North Sea off the coast of Norfolk. She was on a voyage from Hartlepool, County Durham to London. She was refloated and taken in to Grimsby, Lincolnshire in a leaky condition.
Inglewood	United Kingdom	The barque was wrecked on the Lafolle Reef. Her sixteen crew were rescued. She was on a voyage from Cardiff to St. Jago de Cuba, Cuba.
Malakoff	(United Kingdom of Great Britain and Ireland) Isle of Man	The schooner was driven ashore at Maughold Head. She was on a voyage from Liverpool to Galway. She had become a wreck by 25 January.
Nancy and Betsey	United Kingdom	The ship was driven ashore at Formby, Lancashire. She was on a voyage from Liverpool to Barrow-in-Furness.
Rhine	United Kingdom	The schooner was driven ashore and wrecked on Coll, Inner Hebrides. She was on a voyage from Limerick to London.
Rodolph	United Kingdom	The ship was driven ashore at Maughold Head. She was on a voyage from Morecambe Bay to Ardrossan, Ayrshire.
Tranby	United Kingdom	The brig collided with Circassian (United Kingdom) and foundered in the North Sea off Spurn Point, East Riding of Yorkshire. She was on a voyage from the River Tyne to London.

== 15 January ==
List of shipwrecks: 15 January 1860
Ship	State	Description
Amitie	France	The barque ran aground on a reef in the Straits of Ballyback. She was on a voyage from Singapore, Straits Settlements to China. She was refloated and put back to Singapore.
Fair Kathleen	United Kingdom	The barque was driven ashore and wrecked at North Button, Cromartyshire. Her crew were rescued. She was on a voyage from South Shields, County Durham to Liverpool, Lancashire.
Jacques Antonio	France	The brig was driven ashore and wrecked near the Corsewall Lighthouse, Wigtownshire, United Kingdom. Her crew were rescued. She was on a voyage from Rouen, Seine-Inférieure to Liverpool.

== 16 January ==
List of shipwrecks: 16 January 1860
Ship	State	Description
Alexander Wise	United States	The brig was driven ashore and wrecked at Wilmington, Delaware. Her nine crew survived. She was on a voyage from Marseille, Bouches-du-Rhône, France to New York. She was destroyed by fire on 20 January.
Carlisle	United Kingdom	The brig ran aground at Brouwershaven, Zeeland, Netherlands. She was on a voyage from Newcastle upon Tyne, Northumberland to Brouwershave. She was refloated and taken in to port.
Heart of Oak	United Kingdom	The barque was driven ashore at Happisburgh, Norfolk. She was refloated and resumed her voyage.
Hero	United Kingdom	The ship ran aground at Hartlepool, County Durham. She was refloated the next day and put back to Hartlepool.
Latona	United Kingdom	The ship ran aground at Hartlepool. She was refloated the next day and put back to Hartlepool.
Sylph	United Kingdom	The brig was destroyed by fire in Chesapeake Bay. She was on a voyage from Trinidad to Baltimore, Maryland, United States.

== 18 January ==
List of shipwrecks: 18 January 1860
Ship	State	Description
Barnsley	United Kingdom	The steamship ran aground at Heligoland. Her 20 crew survived. She was on a voyage from London to Hamburg.
Caledonia	United Kingdom	The full-rigged ship was abandoned in the Atlantic Ocean. Her fifteen crew survived. She was on a voyage from Saint John, New Brunswick to Liverpool, Lancashire.
Dark	United Kingdom	The schooner ran aground at South Shields, County Durham and was damaged. She was on a voyage from Huelva, Spain to South Shields. She was refloated and taken in to South Shields in a leaky condition.
Marshall	United Kingdom	The brig was wrecked on the Gunfleet Sand, in the North Sea off the coast of Suffolk. Her crew were rescued by the smack Express (United Kingdom)). Marshall was on a voyage from the River Tyne to London.
Northern	United States	The steamship was wrecked off Medocino, California with the loss of 36 lives. She was on a voyage from San Francisco, California to Portland, Maine.
Rock	United Kingdom	The ship was driven ashore in Chapelrossan Bay. She was on a voyage from Workington, Cumberland to Carrickfergus, County Antrim.
Sisters	United Kingdom	The sloop sprang a leak and was run ashore at Bexhill-on-Sea, Sussex, where she became a wreck. Her crew were rescued. She was on a voyage from Gainsborough, Lincolnshire to Portland, Dorset and London.
Venus	United Kingdom	The ship struck a sunken wreck 9 nautical miles (17 km) off the Newarp Lightship ( Trinity House) and was damaged. She was on a voyage from South Shields, County Durham to Veracruz, Mexico. She consequently put back to South Shields in a leaky condition.

== 19 January ==
List of shipwrecks: 19 January 1860
Ship	State	Description
Conrad	United Kingdom	The full-rigged ship was abandoned at sea. Her 25 crew were rescued by Duchess of Beaufort and Helen (both United Kingdom). Conrad was on a voyage from Cardiff, Glamorgan to Málaga, Spain.
Fidelia	United Kingdom	The barque was wrecked on the Canig Rocks, on the coast of County Wexford. She was on a voyage from Liverpool, Lancashire to Cuba.
H. Fidden	United Kingdom	The barque was driven ashore and wrecked at Ballygeary, County Dublin. She was on a voyage from Liverpool to Cuba.
Princess Victoria	United Kingdom	The ship ran aground on the Barber Sand, in the North Sea off the coast of Norfolk, She was on a voyage from Blyth, Northumberland to Boulogne-sur-Mer, Pas-de-Calais, France. She was refloated and taken in to Great Yarmouth, Norfolk in a leaky condition.
Produce	United Kingdom	The brig sprang a leak and was beached at Penzance, Cornwall. She was on a voyage from Hull, Yorkshire to Constanţa, Ottoman Empire. She was refloated and taken in to Penzance.
Ulysses	United Kingdom	The ship was wrecked near Ryhope, County Durham. She was on a voyage from Wells-next-the-Sea, Norfolk to Newcastle upon Tyne, Northumberland.

== 20 January ==
List of shipwrecks: 20 January 1860
Ship	State	Description
Adeline	United Kingdom	The barque foundered. Her fifteen crew were rescued by the barque San Demetrio (Malta). Adeline was on a voyage from Newcastle upon Tyne, Northumberland to Cádiz, Spain.
Alice Gill	United Kingdom	The barque was driven ashore and wrecked at Spittal Point, Northumberland. Her twelve crew survived. She was on a voyage from Hamburg to South Shields, County Durham.
Amicitzia	Sardinia	The brig was driven ashore at Wexford, United Kingdom. She was on a voyage from Liverpool, Lancashire, United Kingdom to Genoa. She was refloated and beached at "Hantoon" in a waterlogged condition. She capsized on 24 January and was wrecked.
Harmonia	United Kingdom	The ship was driven ashore at Boulogne, Pas-de-Calais, France. She was on a voyage from Porto, Portugal to London.
Iris	United Kingdom	The schooner was wrecked on Scatterie Island, Nova Scotia, British North America. She was on a voyage from Boston, Massachusetts, United States to Fortune Bay, Newfoundland, British North America.

== 21 January ==
List of shipwrecks: 21 January 1860
Ship	State	Description
Ann Dunne	United Kingdom	The barque was driven ashore at Galway.
Arabella	United Kingdom	The sloop was driven ashore at Carrickfergus, County Antrim. She was on a voyage from Stranraer, Wigtownshire to Liverpool, Lancashire. She was later refloated and put in to Belfast for repairs.
Caroline	United Kingdom	The brig was driven ashore near Stranraer. She was on a voyage from Workington, Cumberland to Londonderry.
Constant	Belgium	The ship was driven ashore and wrecked on Guernsey, Channel Islands. Her crew were rescued. She was on a voyage from Ostend, West Flanders to Cartagena, Spain.
Eliza Grieve	United Kingdom	The brig was driven ashore in the Chesapeake River. She was on a voyage from Baltimore, Maryland, United States to Saint John, New Brunswick, British North America. She was refloated with assistance from a steamship and resumed her voyage.
Emmanuele Tagliateiro	Flag unknown	The ship was driven ashore at Cullen Point, County Mayo, United Kingdom.
Fairy	United Kingdom	The schooner was run into by the steamship Caledonian and sank at Stranraer. Her crew were rescued.
Fairy	United Kingdom	The barque was driven ashore and wrecked at Pembrey, Pembrokeshire. Her eleven crew were rescued. She was on a voyage from Llanelly, Glamorgan to Dieppe, Seine-Inférieure, France.
Haabet	Netherlands	The schooner was driven ashore at Kingstown, County Dublin, United Kingdom. She was refloated with assistance from HMS Ajax1809 (6) (Royal Navy) and towed in to Dublin in a leaky condition.
Judith	United Kingdom	The ship ran aground on the Falsterbo Reef, in the Baltic Sea off the coast of Sweden and was wrecked. She was on a voyage from Danzig to Hartlepool, County Durham.
Margaret	United Kingdom	The brigantine was driven ashore at Selsey Bill, Sussex. She was on a voyage from South Shields, County Durham to Ventnor, Isle of Wight. She was refloated and taken in to Littlehampton, Sussex in a severely leay condition.
Mary	United Kingdom	The smack was driven ashore north of Ballyconiger, County Wexford. Her crew were rescued.
Mary	United Kingdom	The Mersey Flat sank at Liverpool, Lancashire. Both crew were rescued.
Neptune	United Kingdom	The barque was driven ashore and wrecked on Achill Island, County Mayo with the loss of two of her thirteen crew. She was on a voyage from Demerara, British Guiana to London.
Robert Mills	United Kingdom	The ship was driven ashore at Holyhead, Anglesey. She was on a voyage from Liverpool to Galveston, Texas, United States. She was refloated and taken in to Holyhead in a severely leaky condition.
Stork, and William Marsland	United Kingdom	Stork and William collided in the Atlantic Ocean and both vessels foundered. Stork lost three of her crew; her survivors were rescued by Jane Goodyear (United Kingdom) and Johanna Andrea (Denmark). She was on the return leg of her maiden voyage, from Sulina, Ottoman Empire to Leith, Lothian. All on board William Marsland were lost apart from a passenger. She was on a voyage from Swansea, Glamorgan to Chile.

== 22 January ==
List of shipwrecks: 22 January 1860
Ship	State	Description
Acorn	United Kingdom	The ship was driven ashore at Whitehaven, Cumberland.
Ann Cornish, or Eliza Cornish	United Kingdom	The brigantine collided with Hannah and was abandoned off Great Yarmouth, Norfolk. She was subsequently taken in to Great Yarmouth in a damaged condition.
Ann Mitchell	United Kingdom	The schooner was driven ashore 4.5 nautical miles (8.3 km) north east of Fleetwood, Lancashire with the loss of four of her five crew. The survivor was rescued by the Fleetwood Lifeboat. She was on a voyage from Sligo to Liverpool, Lancashire.
Brodrenes Haab	Sweden–Norway	The ship was driven ashore and wrecked in Scapa Flow. Her crew were rescued. She was on a voyage from Liverpool to Narva, Russia.
Charles Brownell	United Kingdom	The barque ran aground and sank in the River Wyre. Her thirteen crew survived. She was on a voyage from Singapore, Straits Settlements to Liverpool. She was refloated on 4 February and taken in to Fleetwood.
Clydeside, and Express	United Kingdom	The brig Clydeside collided with the schooner Express and both vessels sank in the North Sea off the coast of Suffolk. Their crews were rescued by the brig Cumberland (United Kingdom). Clydeside was on a voyage from South Shields, County Durham to Rochester, Kent. Express was on a voyage from Hartlepool, County Durham to Rochester. Clydeside also reported as Clydesdale.
Dankbaarheid	Netherlands	The ship ran aground on the Haisborough Sands, in the North Sea off the coast of Norfolk. She was on a voyage from South Shields to Vlissingen, Zeeland. Dankbaarheid was refloated with assistance but was abandoned by her crew. She was subsequently taken in to Great Yarmouth, Norfolk in a leaky condition.
Diolinda	(United Kingdom of Great Britain and Ireland) Guernsey	The schooner was run down and sunk off Happisburgh, Norfolk by Marsh Mallow (United Kingdom). Her seven crew were rescued. Diolinda was on a voyage from South Shields to Morlaix, Finistère, France.
Eliza and Anne	United Kingdom	The ship sank at "Hubberstone Pill", Pembrokeshire. She was on a voyage from Cardiff, Glamorgan to Liverpool. She was refloated on 31 January and take in to Milford Haven, Pembrokeshire for repairs.
George	United Kingdom	The ship was driven ashore at Whitehaven.
Harmony and Isabella	United Kingdom	The ship was driven ashore at Silloth, Cumberland. She was on a voyage from Belfast, County Antrim to Maryport, Cumberland.
Henburt	United Kingdom	The ship caught fire at Otago, New Zealand and was scuttled. She was refloated on 28 January.
James Alexander	United Kingdom	The full-rigged ship was wrecked at St Eval, Cornwall with the loss of two, or all but two, of her crew. She was on a voyage from Liverpool to Calcutta, India.
Jane	United Kingdom	The ship was driven ashore at Silloth. She was on a voyage from Belfast to Maryport.
Jane	United Kingdom	The ship was driven ashore at Port William, Dumfriesshire.
Jane	United Kingdom	The ship foundered in the North Sea 56 nautical miles (104 km) off Flamborough Head, Yorkshire. Her crew survived.
Jane	United Kingdom	The brig sprang a leak and foundered in the North Sea 50 nautical miles (93 km) off Flamborough Head, Yorkshire. Her six crew were rescued by Mary and Sarah (United Kingdom). Jane was on a voyage from Warkworth, Northumberland to Boulogne, Pas-de-Calais, France.
Jane Roper	United Kingdom	The ship ran aground and sank on the Shell Wharf Flats, in the Irish Sea 6 nautical miles (11 km) west of Fleetwood. Her four crew were rescued by the Fleetwood Lifeboat. She was on a voyage from Ardrossan, Ayrshire to Morecambe, Lancashire.
Lord Gough	United Kingdom	The ship ran aground on the Barber Sand, in the North Sea off the coast of Norfolk and was abandoned. She was subsequently taken in to Great Yarmouth in a leaky condition.
Lloynes	United Kingdom	The ship was driven ashore south of Sunderland, County Durham. She was on a voyage from Wells-next-the-Sea, Norfolk to Newcastle upon Tyne, Northumberland.
Mondigo	Portuguese Navy	The brig of war was abandoned in the Atlantic Ocean with the loss of 44 crew. Sixty-eight survivors were rescued by the full-rigged ship Uriel (United States), which lost three of her crew attempting the rescue. Mondigo was on a voyage from China to Lisbon.
Princess Royal	United Kingdom	The barque was driven ashore near Yarmouth, Isle of Wight. She was on a voyage from New York, United States to Bristol, Gloucestershire. She was refloated on 24 January and taken in to New York for repairs.
Provedenza	Flag unknown	The ship ran aground on the Rose Sand, in the North Sea off the coast of Lincolnshire, United Kingdom. She was on a voyage from South Shields to Odesa.
Rose	(United Kingdom of Great Britain and Ireland) Isle of Man	The ship was driven ashore at Whitehaven.
Rose	United Kingdom	The ship was driven ashore at Whitehaven.
Tallulah	United States	The brig was driven ashore at Knott End-on-Sea, Lancashire. She was on a voyage from Savannah, Georgia to Fleetwood, Lancashire. She was refloated the next day and towed in to Fleetwood.
Xephias	United Kingdom	The full-rigged ship was abandoned in the Atlantic Ocean. Her 21 crew were rescued by Harvest Queen (United Kingdom). Xephias was on a voyage from Saint John, New Brunswick, British North America to Liverpool.

== 23 January ==
List of shipwrecks: 23 January 1860
Ship	State	Description
Alert	United Kingdom	The schooner was driven ashore at Whitbeck, Cumberland in a capsized condition.
Ann	United Kingdom	The ship foundered off Bawdsey, Suffolk. Her crew were rescued by Richard (United Kingdom). Ann was on a voyage from Goole, Yorkshire to London.
Ann	United Kingdom	The ship was driven ashore on Hare Island, County Galway. She was refloated the next day.
Beaver	United Kingdom	The ship was driven ashore in the Yangtze.
Durham Packet	United Kingdom	The brig ran aground on the Holm Sand, in the North Sea off the coast of Suffolk. She was refloated and resumed her voyage.
Effort	United Kingdom	The brig ran aground on the Shipwash Sand, in the North Sea off the coast of Suffolk. She was on a voyage from Montrose, Forfarshire to Cádiz, Spain. She was refloated and taken in to Lowestoft, Suffolk in a leaky condition.
Eleanor	United States	The ship caught fire at Apalachicola, Florida and was scuttled.
James Mitchell	United Kingdom	The ship sank at Fleetwood, Lancashire with the loss of all but one of her crew. The survivor was rescued by the Fleetwood Lifeboat. She was on a voyage from Sligo to Liverpool.
RMS Medway	United Kingdom	The steamship ran aground in the Solent. She was on a voyage from Saint Thomas, Virgin Islands to Southampton, Hampshire. She was refloated the next day and completed her voyage.
Sarah Ann	United Kingdom	The ship was driven ashore on the coast of Norfolk. She was on a voyage from Seaham, County Durham to King's Lynn, Norfolk. She was refloated on 25 January and taken in to King's Lynn.
Severn	United Kingdom	The ship was abandoned in the North Sea 60 nautical miles (110 km) off Spurn Point, Yorkshire. Her crew survived. She was on a voyage from Seaham, County Durham to Rochester, Kent.
Syren	United Kingdom	The ship was abandoned in the North Sea 40 nautical miles (74 km) off the mouth of the Humber. Her crew were rescued by the fishing smack Comet (United Kingdom). Syren was on a voyage from South Shields, County Durham to London.
William	United Kingdom	The ship ran aground at Galway.
William Gillis	United Kingdom	The ship was driven ashore in the Yangtze.

== 24 January ==
List of shipwrecks: 24 January 1860
Ship	State	Description
Ada	United Kingdom	The schooner was driven ashore and wrecked in the Belfast Lough at Ballyquintin Point, County Antrim. She was on a voyage from Ayr to Runcorn, Cheshire. She was refloated on 1 February and beached at Portaferry, County Antrim.
Allohies	United Kingdom	The schooner was driven ashore and wrecked near Berehaven, County Cork. Her crew were rescued.
Ann	United Kingdom	The schooner foundered between the Whiting and Cutler Sands, in the North Sea off the coast of Suffolk. Her crew were rescued. She was on a voyage from Goole, Yorkshire to London.
Anne Stainton	United Kingdom	The ship ran aground on the Race Bank, in the North Sea off the coast of Lincolnshire. She was on a voyage from South Shields, County Durham to London. She was refloated and put in to Grimsby, Lincolnshire in a leaky condition.
Chance	United Kingdom	The dandy cutter was driven ashore and wrecked at Aberdeen.
Dawson's	United Kingdom	The barque was driven ashore and wrecked at "Eulinas", Spain. Her six crew were rescued. She was on a voyage from Blyth, Northumberland to Constantinople, Ottoman Empire.
Friends	United Kingdom	The schooner was driven ashore at the Landguard Fort, Felixtowe, Suffolk. She was on a voyage from Pittenweem, Fife to London. She was refloated the next day.
Gleaner	United States	The barque caught fire at Apalachicola, Florida, and was scuttled in 18 feet (5.5 m) of water. She was on a voyage from Apalachicoka to Amsterdam, North Holland, Netherlands. Gleaner was refloated on 6 February.
Honorine Maria	France	The ship was driven ashore in the River Ribble.
Jane	United Kingdom	The ship foundered in the North Sea 80 nautical miles (150 km) off Flamborough Head, Yorkshire. Her crew were rescued by London (United Kingdom).
Johns	United Kingdom	The schooner was driven ashore and wrecked at Belhaven, Lothian. Her crew were rescued. Johns was on a voyage from Pittenweem, Fife to London. She broke up on 26 January.
Lille Edmond	Denmark	The brigantine struck the Whittaker and Shipwash Sands, in the North Sea off the coast of Suffolk. She was beached at Walton-on-the-Naze, Essex, United Kingdom and was abandoned by her crew. She was on a voyage from Grenane, Ayrshire, United Kingdom to London. She was refloated and taken in to Harwich, Essex in a waterlogged condition.
Monaghan	United Kingdom	The schooner ran aground and was wrecked at Beauly, Inverness-shire.
Pallas	United Kingdom	The brig was wrecked on the Sizewell Bank, in the North Sea off the coast of Suffolk with the loss of five of her eight crew. Survivors were rescued by the Thorpeness Lifeboat. She was on a voyage from Newcastle upon Tyne, Northumberland to London.
Roe	United Kingdom	The ship was driven ashore and wrecked at St Bees, Cumberland. She was on a voyage from Liverpool, Lancashire to the Clyde.
Sir Robert Campbell	United Kingdom	The ship was driven ashore at Allonby, Cumberland.
Spy	United Kingdom	The dandy sloop foundered in The Swale. Her crew were rescued. She was on a voyage from Faversham, Kent to London.
Vesper	United Kingdom	The schooner ran aground at Beauly, Inverness-shire and was wrecked. She was on a voyage from Sunderland, County Durham to Beauly.
Yandew	United Kingdom	The schooner was driven ashore at the Landguard Fort. She was on a voyage from Hartlepool County Durham to Rochester, Kent. She was refloated the next day.
Zuleika	United Kingdom	The barque was driven ashore near Cape Spartel, Morocco. Her eleven crew survived, but one was subsequently killed by hostile Moors. The survivors were subsequently rescued by HMS Vulture (Royal Navy).

== 25 January ==
List of shipwrecks: 25 January 1860
Ship	State	Description
Elizabeth Morrison	United Kingdom	The ship wrecked at Valona, Ottoman Empire. Her twelve crew survived. She was on a voyage from Glasgow, Renfrewshire to a Mediterranean port.
Fender	United Kingdom	The sloop collided with a brig and foundered in the North Sea. Her crew survived. She was on a voyage from King's Lynn, Norfolk to Stockton-on-Tees, County Durham.
Mayflower	United Kingdom	The ship was abandoned by her crew off Flamborough Head, Yorkshire and was subsequently driven ashore at Bridlington. She was on a voyage from London to Hartlepool, County Durham. She was refloated and taken in to Bridlington.
Matias Cousina	Chile	The ship foundered in the Atlantic Ocean. All on board survived. She was on a voyage from Valparaíso to Buenos Aires, Argentina.
Robert	United Kingdom	The schooner was driven ashore at Lowestoft, Suffolk. She was on a voyage from Rochester, Kent to Hartlepool, County Durham. She was refloated.
Sapphire	United Kingdom	The full-rigged ship was lost in the Torres Straits. Her 32 crew survived. She was on a voyage from Sydney, New South Wales to Madras, India.
Sir Henry Webb	United Kingdom	The brig ran aground on the Dudgeon Sand, in the North Sea and was abandoned by her crew. She was on a voyage from Newcastle upon Tyne, Northumberland to London.
William	United Kingdom	The smack was wrecked on "Barnagh Island", County Mayo.
William George	United Kingdom	The ship ran aground on the Cross Sand, in the North Sea off the coast of Norfolk. She was on a voyage from Sunderland, County Durham to London. She was refloated and put into Great Yarmouth in a leaky condition, taking on extra hands and resuming her voyage.

== 26 January ==
List of shipwrecks: 26 January 1860
Ship	State	Description
Ann Stainton	United Kingdom	The brig struck the Race Bank, in the North Sea off the coast of Lincolnshire and was damaged. She was on a voyage from London to South Shields, County Durham. She was refloated and put in to Grimsby in a leaky condition.
Athens	United Kingdom	The brig was driven ashore and wrecked at Robin Hood's Bay, Yorkshire. Her crew were rescued. She was on a voyage from London to South Shields.
Carlo	Spain	The ship was driven ashore and wrecked at Llanelly, Glamorgan, United Kingdom. Thirteen of her twenty crew were reported to have been rescued, the remainder were presumed to have been lost. She was on a voyage from Smyrna, Ottoman Empire to London, United Kingdom.
Cocidius	United Kingdom	The ship departed from Liverpool, Lancashire for Constantinople, Ottoman Empire. No further trace, presumed foundered with the loss of all hands.
Copy	United Kingdom	The schooner collided with the brig William and John (United Kingdom) and sank off the Kent coast. Her crew were rescued. She was on a voyage from Sunderland, County Durham to Southampton, Hampshire.
Dinapore	United Kingdom	The full-rigged ship was wrecked at Le Conquet, Finistère, France with the loss of twenty of her 29 crew. She was on a voyage from Cardiff, Glamorgan to Aden.
Earl Bathurst	United Kingdom	The brig was driven ashore and wrecked in Robin Hood's Bay. Her crew were rescued. She was refloated on 4 February and towed in to Whitby, Yorkshire.
Elizabeth	United Kingdom	The ship was driven ashore at Donaghadee, County Down with the loss of her captain.
Elizabeth Reed	United Kingdom	The schooner was driven ashore and severely damaged on Lindisfarne, Northumberland.
Ellen, or Helen	(United Kingdom of Great Britain and Ireland) Jersey	The schooner collided with the brig Shealtiel (United Kingdom) and sank off the Kent coast with the loss of her captain. Survivors were rescued by Shealtiel. Ellen was subsequently assisted in to Ramsgate, Kent by two luggers.
Emily	United Kingdom	The brig was driven ashore and wrecked in Robin Hood's Bay Her crew were rescued. She was refloated on 6 February and taken in to Whitby.
Familien	Russia	The barque was wrecked on Terschelling, Friesland, Netherlands with some loss of life. She was on a voyage from Hartlepool, County Durham to Genoa, Sardinia.
George Duncan	United Kingdom	The schooner was wrecked on the Shipwash Sand, in the North Sea off the coast of Suffolk. Her crew were rescued.
Hebe	United Kingdom	The brig was driven ashore and wrecked in Robin Hood's Bay Her crew were rescued.
Hope	United Kingdom	The ship ran ashore in the Garadon Islands, off Malin Head, County Donegal and was abandoned by her crew. She was on a voyage from Gloucester to Londonderry. She had sunk by 13 February.
James Dixon	United Kingdom	The schooner collided with another vessel and was abandoned in the North Sea. she was on a voyage from the River Tyne to London.
Jane Baxter	United Kingdom	After the ship collided with Runnymede (United Kingdom) in the North Sea her crew abandoned Jane Baxter. Runnymede rescued the crew. Jane Baxter was on a voyage from South Shields, County Durham to Maldon, Essex. She subsequently foundered.
John & Isabella	United Kingdom	The brig foundered in the North Sea off Walberswick, Suffolk, England. Her crew were rescued by the brig Friends (United Kingdom). John & Isabella was on a voyage from South Shields to London.
Louisa	United Kingdom	The sloop was wrecked on the Annat Sand, in the North Sea off the coast of Forfarshire. Her crew were rescued. She was on a voyage from Alloa, Clackmannanshire to Montrose, Forfarshire.
Marion	United Kingdom	The brig was driven ashore and wrecked in Robin Hood's Bay Her crew were rescued.
Miriam	United Kingdom	The schooner was driven ashore and wrecked in Robin Hood's Bay Her crew were rescued.
Nina	United Kingdom	The ship was driven ashore on "Poloma Island", Uruguay. She was on a voyage from London to Montevideo, Uruguay. She was refloated on 13 February, and towed in to Montevideo, where she arrived on 15 February.
Owen Glendwr	United Kingdom	The barque was destroyed by fire near Coquimbo, Chile. Her sixteen crew survived. She was on a voyage from Swansea, Glamorgan to Coquimbo.
Pivot	United Kingdom	The ship was driven ashore at Donaghadee.
Pursuit	United Kingdom	The ship was driven ashore at Donaghadee.
Q	Spain	The barque was wrecked on Holy Isle, in the Firth of Clyde with the loss of one of her fifteen crew. She was on a voyage from Greenock, Renfrewshire, United Kingdom to Santander.
Swan	United Kingdom	The brig was driven ashore and wrecked in Robin Hood's Bay Her crew were rescued. She was refloated on 8 February and taken in to Whitby.
Trois Sœurs	France	The lugger was driven ashore and wrecked at Blankenberge, West Flanders, Belgium with the loss of a crew member. She was on a voyage from Sunderland to Caen, Calvados.
Veronica	United Kingdom	The brig was driven ashore and wrecked in Robin Hood's Bay Her crew were rescued. She was towed in to Scarborough on 6 February.
William Hutt	United Kingdom	The brig was abandoned in the North Sea off Lowestoft, Suffolk. Her twelve crew survived. She was on a voyage from South Shields to Brest, Finistère, France.
William Watson	United Kingdom	The brig was driven ashore and wrecked in Robin Hood's Bay Her crew were rescued. She was refloated on 6 February and taken in to Whitby.

== 27 January ==
List of shipwrecks: 27 January 1860
Ship	State	Description
Alexander	United Kingdom	The ship was abandoned in the Atlantic Ocean. Her crew were rescued by Kirkconnel (United Kingdom).
Antilles	United Kingdom	The ship was driven ashore at Dungeness, Kent. She was on a voyage from South Shields, County Durham to Havre de Grâce, Seine-Inférieure, France. She was refloated and found to be severely leaky.
Athens	United Kingdom	The brig was driven ashore and wrecked at Robin Hood's Bay, Yorkshire. Her nine crew survived. She was on a voyage from London to South Shields.
Hebe	United Kingdom	The ship foundered in the North Sea off the coast of Northumberland.
John and Isabella	United Kingdom	The brig foundered in the North Sea off Southwold, Suffolk. She was on a voyage from the River Tyne to London.
Major	United Kingdom	The schooner sank in Liverpool Bay. Her crew were rescued by the Liverpool Lifeboat. She was on a voyage from Liverpool, Lancashire to Tralee, County Kerry.
Mary Mac	United Kingdom	The brig was driven ashore in Robin Hood's Bay. Her crew were rescued. sHe was on a voyage from Wivenhoe, Essex to South Shields. She was refloated with the assistance of three cobles and taken in to Scarborough, Yorkshire.
Monarch	United Kingdom	The ship foundered in the North Sea off the coast of Northumberland.
Number Four	United Kingdom	The schooner was abandoned in the English Channel off the coast of Sussex. Her crew were rescued. She was on a voyage from Sunderland, County Durham to Southampton, Hampshire. She was towed in to Shoreham-by-Sea, Sussex.
Providence	United Kingdom	The brig was driven ashore and wrecked at Spittal Point, Northumberland. She was refloated on 12 February and take in to Berwick upon Tweed in a severely damaged condition.
Rosario	Spain	The barque was driven ashore on Holy Isle, in the Firth of Clyde. She was on a voyage from the Clyde to Santander.
Sobraon	United Kingdom	The ship was driven ashore at Barmouth, Merionethshire. she was on a voyage from Liverpool, Lancashire to Africa. She was refloated and resumed her voyage.
Trinity Yacht	United Kingdom	The schooner sprang a leak was abandoned in the North Sea off the coast of Norfolk. Her crew were rescued by Alice (United Kingdom). Trinity Yacht was on a voyage from São Miguel Island, Azores to Hull, Yorkshire. She was taken in to Great Yarmouth the next day in a waterlogged condition.

== 28 January ==
List of shipwrecks: 28 January 1860
Ship	State	Description
Alexandrine	Hamburg	The ship was driven ashore in the Elbe. She was on a voyage from Avola, Sicily to Hamburg.
Dove	United Kingdom	The smack was wrecked on the Isle of Whithorn, Wigtownshire. Her crew were rescued. She was on a voyage from Maryport, Cumberland to "Drumore".
Ebenezer	United Kingdom	The schooner was abandoned in the North Sea off Hartlepool, County Durham. Her crew were rescued by the brig Temiscouata (United Kingdom). Ebenezer was on a voyage from Middlesbrough, Yorkshire to Leigh-on-Sea, Essex.
George Duncan	United Kingdom	The ship sank in the North Sea off the coast of Suffolk. SHe was on a voyage from Dundee, Forfarshire to London.
Ibis	United Kingdom	The ship ran aground on the Whiting Sand, in the North Sea off the coast of Suffolk. She was on a voyage from Sunderland, County Durham to London. She was refloated and taken in to Harwich, Essex in a leaky condition.
John J. Boyd	United States	The full-rigged ship was destroyed by fire at New York.
Joseph and Mary	United Kingdom	The sloop ran aground on the Cockle Sand, in the North Sea off the coast of Norfolk. She was refloated and taken in to Great Yarmouth, Norfolk in a leaky condition.
Medium	United Kingdom	The barque ran aground on the Herd Sand, in the North Sea off the coast of County Durham. Her crew were rescued by the North Shields Lifeboat. Medium had broken her back by 31 January. She was refloated on 4 February and beached at South Shields, County Durham.
Salem	United Kingdom	The ship was driven ashore at Dieppe, Seine-Inférieure, France. She was on a voyage from Newcastle upon Tyne, Northumberland to Dieppe. She was refloated and taken in to Dieppe.
Sharpe	United Kingdom	The barque was driven ashore at North Shields, County Durham. Her crew were rescued by the North Shields Lifeboat. She was refloated on 4 February and beached at South Shields.

== 29 January ==
List of shipwrecks: 29 January 1860
Ship	State	Description
Carl	Duchy of Holstein	The ship ran aground at Fehmarn. She was on a voyage from Fehmarn to Newcastle upon Tyne, Northumberland, United Kingdom. She was refloated but had to be beached. Carl was refloated on 9 February and taken in to Heiligenhafen.
Earl of Eglinton	United Kingdom	The full-rigged ship was driven ashore and wrecked at South Foreland, Kent. Her 40 crew survived. She was on a voyage from London to Calcutta, India.
Minerva	Sweden	The schooner was driven ashore and wrecked on Texel, North Holland, Netherlands. Her crew were rescued. She was on a voyage from Grimsby, Lincolnshire, United Kingdom to Alicante, Spain.

== 30 January ==
List of shipwrecks: 30 January 1860
Ship	State	Description
Adeline	United Kingdom	The ship was driven ashore and wrecked in the Isles of Scilly. She was on a voyage from Troon, Ayrshire to Málaga, Spain.
Ann Mitchell	United Kingdom	The full-rigged ship ran aground on the Arklow Bank, in the Irish Sea off the coast of County Wicklow and sank. Her eighteen crew were rescued by the Arklow Lifeboat. Ann Mitchell was on a voyage from Liverpool, Lancashire to Bombay, India.
Arab	United Kingdom	The brig was driven ashore near Walmer Castle, Kent. She was refloated and taken in to Ramsgate, Kent.
Britannia	United Kingdom	The ship was wrecked on the Doom Bar. She was on a voyage from Bangor to Aberdeen.
Earl of Zetland	United Kingdom	The lugger foundered off the coast of Kent with the loss of a crew member. She was on a voyage from the South Foreland to Ramsgate.
Eliza Stewart	United Kingdom	The brig was driven ashore in Marsh Bay, Kent. Her crew were rescued.
Island Maid	United Kingdom	The brigantine was driven ashore and wrecked at Douarnenez, Finistère with the loss of four of her seven crew. She was on a voyage from Marseille, Bouches-du-Rhône, France to Falmouth, Cornwall.
Lady Seale	United Kingdom	The steamship was driven ashore 2 nautical miles (3.7 km) south of Withernsea, Yorkshire. Her crew survived. She was on a voyage from Hartlepool, County Durham to London. She was refloated on 6 February and taken in to Hull, Yorkshire.
Maria Elizabeth Margaretha	Netherlands	The full-rigged ship foundered in the Atlantic Ocean off the Isles of Scilly with the loss of ten crew. She was on a voyage from Cardiff, Glamorgan. United Kingdom to Singapore, Straits Settlements.
Pauline	Hamburg	The schooner was driven ashore and damaged in the Isles of Scilly.
Riga	Russia	The ship ran aground off Ameland, Friesland, Netherlands. She was on a voyage from Landskrona, Sweden to London, United Kingdom.
Traffic	United Kingdom	The schooner ran aground on the Gunfleet Sand, in the North Sea off the coast of Suffolk. She was on a voyage from Macduff, Aberdeenshire to London. She was refloated and assisted in to Harwich, Essex in a leaky condition.

== 31 January ==
List of shipwrecks: 31 January 1860
Ship	State	Description
British Queen	United Kingdom	The schooner sprang a leak and foundered in the English Channel off Start Point, Devon. Her seven crew were rescued by Rising Sun (United Kingdom). British Queen was on a voyage from the Rio Grande to Falmouth, Cornwall.
Christian Charlotte	United Kingdom	The ship foundered in the North Sea off Robin Hoods Bay, Yorkshire. Her crew were rescued. She was on a voyage from Sunderland, County Durham to London.
Confidence	United Kingdom	The brig was run ashore and sank at Grimsby, Lincolnshire.
Dion	United Kingdom	The brig was wrecked at the Fort de Bertheaume, Plougonvelin, Finistère, France with the loss of two of her seven crew. She was on a voyage from Dublin to Cádiz, Spain.
Dumfriesshire	United Kingdom	The ship was abandoned at sea. Her crew were rescued by Fleetwood (United Kingdom) Dumfriesshire was on a voyage from Callao, Peru to Liverpool, Lancashire.
Endymion	United States	The full-rigged ship caught fire and was beached at New Brighton, Cheshire, United Kingdom. All on board were rescued by the tug Liver (United Kingdom). Endymion was on a voyage from Liverpool to New York. Despite fire-fighting efforts by the tugs Alliance, Brother Jonathan, Constitution, Despatch, Liffey, Pilot, Rattler and United States, the ship Hastings (all United Kingdom), the steamship Seamew (United Kingdom) and land based fire engines, she was severely damaged. Endymion was refloated on 5 February and taken in to Liverpool.
Island Queen	United Kingdom	The barque was abandoned in the Atlantic Ocean. Her thirteen crew were rescued by Susan Vittery (United Kingdom). Island Queen was on a voyage from Cardiff to Málaga, Spain.
Jane E. Walsh	United States	The ship foundered in the Atlantic Ocean. Her crew were rescued by the schooner Tell Tale (United Kingdom). Jane E. Walsh was on a voyage from Liverpool to Havana, Cuba.
Lord Dacre	United Kingdom	The brig ran aground at Pembrey, Pembrokeshire. She was on a voyage from Pembrey to London. She was refloated and resumed her voyage, but consequently put in to Swansea, Glamorgan in a severely leaky condition.
Marianne Walsh	United Kingdom	The brigantine was wrecked at San Sebastián, Spain. Her six crew were rescued. She was on a voyage from Cardiff, Glamorgan to a Spanish port.
Ringmahon Castle	(United Kingdom of Great Britain and Ireland) Jersey	The brig ran aground at Lowestoft, Suffolk. She was on a voyage from Hartlepool, County Durham to Plymouth, Devon. She was refloated and taken in to Lowestoft in a severely leaky condition.
Rosalie	United Kingdom	The brig was wrecked on a reef off Grand Turk Island, Turks Islands. She was on a voyage from New York City to the Turks Islands.
Scamander	United Kingdom	The steamship foundered in the Bay of Biscay. All 41 people on board were rescued by the steamship Cornelia (Netherlands). Scamander was on a voyage from Liverpool to Alexandria, Egypt.
Seraph	Sweden–Norway	The barque was wrecked on the Flemish Banks, in the North Sea off the coast of Belgium. Her crew were rescued. She was on a voyage from Newcastle upon Tyne, Northumberland, United Kingdom to Cádiz.
Sir Colin Campbell	United Kingdom	The full-rigged ship foundered in the Atlantic Ocean. Her eighteen crew were rescued. She was on a voyage from Cardiff to Hong Kong.
Southampton	United Kingdom	The brig was driven ashore and wrecked at Contes, Landes, France with the loss of nine of her twelve crew. She was on a voyage from Cardiff to Santander, Spain.
Theodore Henrietta	Netherlands	The ship was driven ashore on Borkum, Kingdom of Hanover. Her crew were rescued. She was on a voyage from Sunderland to Amsterdam, North Holland. She had become a wreck by 9 February.

== Unknown date ==
List of shipwrecks: Unknown date in January 1860
Ship	State	Description
Adriatic	United Kingdom	The ship was lost near Brier Island, Nova Scotia, British North America before 3 January.
Armorial	United Kingdom	The ship was abandoned in the Atlantic Ocean. Her crew were rescued. She was on a voyage from Bristol, Gloucestershire to Savannah, Georgia, United States.
Ava	United Kingdom	The ship was wrecked on Seal Island, Nova Scotia before 4 January. Her crew survived. She was on a voyage from "Lions Island", Patagonia, Argentina to Queenstown, County Cork.
Britannia	United Kingdom	The ship was driven ashore at Barmouth, Merionethshire before 10 January. She was later refloated.
Caledonian	United Kingdom	The ship was abandoned in the Atlantic Ocean. Her crew were rescued. She was on a voyage from Saint John, New Brunswick, British North America to Liverpool, Lancashire.
Chieftain	United Kingdom	The ship was wrecked on the Prata Shoals.
Cornelia	United Kingdom	The ship was lost near Simoda, Japan.
Drei Aurelias	Flag unknown	The ship was driven ashore and wrecked at Bilbao, Spain. Her crew were rescued.
Empire	United Kingdom	The brig was wrecked near Tortola before 17 January.
Greenock	United Kingdom	The ship was abandoned in the Atlantic Ocean before 17 January.
Gudrun	Denmark	The brig was abandoned at sea. She was on a voyage from Copenhagen to Galway, United Kingdom. She was taken in to Dingle, County Kerry, United Kingdom on 27 January.
Kingston	United Kingdom	The barque was lost near Brier Island before 3 January.
Lady Inglis	United Kingdom	The ship was lost near Simoda.
L. Bevan	United Kingdom	The ship was lost near Simoda.
Macao	France	The ship was lost in the China Sea before 5 January. Her crew were rescued.
Mataro	United Kingdom	The ship was destroyed by fire at Tobago. She was on a voyage from Liverpool to Callao, Peru.
Minerva	United Kingdom	The brig was abandoned in the Dogger Bank before 20 January. She was taken in to Great Yarmouth, Norfolk on 28 January with the aid of four smacks.
Modern Greece	United Kingdom	The steamship was driven ashore in the Dardanelles. She was on a voyage from London to Constantinople, Ottoman Empire. She was refloated and taken in to Constantinople, where she arrived on 8 January.
Nymph	United Kingdom	The ship was lost near Simoda.
Sea Serpent	United Kingdom	The ship ran aground on a reef. She was on a voyage from London to Hong Kong. She was refloated and put in to Rio de Janeiro, Brazil, where she arrived on 9 January in a leaky condition.
Senator	United Kingdom	The ship was abandoned in the Indian Ocean 500 nautical miles (930 km) south of Mauritius. Her crew were rescued by a Norwegian brig. She was on a voyage from Liverpool to Bombay, India.
Shomsia Zumbizec	Flag unknown	The ship was wrecked on the Spanish coast. Her crew were rescued.
