= Cumberland (1826 ship) =

History

United Kingdom
- Name: Cumberland
- Namesake: Cumberland
- Operator: 1826:Liverpool Steam Company; 1835:St George Steam Packet Company; 1845:J. Dawson
- Builder: Holyhead
- Launched: 1826
- Fate: Foundered October 1849

General characteristics
- Tons burthen: 1826:201 (bm); 1839:609/403 (bm) (Note: The first measurement represents the measurement under the old Act. The second measurement is the measurement under the new Act, effective 1 January 1836.); 1846:609/521 (bm)

Cumberland was launched at Holyhead in 1826 as a steam packet. In 1839 she underwent conversion to a sail barque. In 1846 Cumberland transported Parkhurst apprentices to the Swan River Colony. She foundered on 23 October 1849 while carrying rice from Bally, Netherlands East Indies, to Hong Kong.

== Career ==
=== Steam packet ===
Boulton, Watt, & Co. provided the engines for Cumberland and her sister ship Solvay. She had masts to augment her engines. Because she had to give up potential cargo space to house the engines and the coal they required, her burthen, a measure of cargo volume, was reduced. This was not critical for packets as they carried passengers and mail. Packets under contract to the Royal Mail were banned from carrying cargo.

Cumberland first appeared in Lloyd's Register (LR) in 1827 with J. Beaney, master, Liverpool Shipping Company, owner, and trade Liverpool–London.

Year	Master	Owner	Trade	Source & notes
1830	Bibby	Steam Company	London–Antwerp	Register of Shipping (RS)
1835	C. Little	St George Company	Liverpool–Newry	LR; large repair 1834

=== Conversion ===
In 1838–9 Cumberland underwent conversion from steam to sail. She apparently was repaired/restored and became a barque. The removal of her engines and coal bunkers increased her burthen, i.e., her cargo capacity. She appeared twice in Lloyd's Register for 1839. The first entry described her as a steam vessel of 201 tons burthen. Her master was still C. Little, and her owner the St George Company. The entry also had a notation referring the reader to the supplemental pages. There Cumberland was described as of 609 (430) tons burthen, with G. Shute, master, St George Company, owner, and based in Liverpool. It described her as a barque, and noted that she had undergone a thorough repair in 1839. Lastly, it carried the further notation "Restored 1839–6 yrs."

=== Barque ===
Lloyd's Register from 1845 to 1847/48 showed Cumberland's owner as J. Dawson, her homeport as London, and her trade as London–Swan River Colony. It also showed her as having undergone small repairs in 1845. It did not show the name of her master.

In 1846 Cumberland transported Parkhurst apprentices to the Swan River Colony.

Lloyd's Register for 1848/49 showed Cumberland's master as J. Lewis, her owner as J. Dawson, and her trade as London–Bombay. She had had damages repaired and small repairs in 1847.

== Special cargos ==
In September 1829 Cumberland transported the steam locomotive Stephenson's Rocket from Bowness-on-Solway to Liverpool for the Rainhill Trials; Rocket had come from Newcastle-on-Tyne to Carlisle by horse wagon, and from there by lighter to the Cumberland.

== Fate ==
Lloyd's Register for 1850 carried the annotation "LOST" by her name. It still carried her master as J. Lewis and her owner as J. Dawson, but it did not give a trade.

Cumberland was lost on 26 October 1849 when she foundered in the Pacific Ocean 40 nautical miles (74 km) off Santiago, Spanish East Indies with the loss of six of her 34 crew. She was on a voyage from Bali, Netherlands East Indies, to Hong Kong, with a cargo of rice. "[t]wo passengers (one being Mr. Dawson, the owner) and 28 men were saved, but the captain and five seamen perished".
