= Hashemy (1817 ship) =

History

United Kingdom
- Name: Hashemy
- Namesake: Al-Hashimi (surname)
- Owner: 1819: Sayed Sadduck (managing owner); 1828: Templer & Co; 1834: Hyde; 1845: Ross, Corbett, & Co. Greenock
- Builder: Michael Smith, Howrah, Calcutta
- Launched: 2 April 1817
- Fate: Hulked c. 1867

General characteristics
- Type: 1817:Ship; 1845:Barque
- Tons burthen: 47960/94 or 495, or 497, or 523(bm)
- Length: 120 ft 0 in (36.6 m)
- Beam: 30 ft 6 in (9.3 m)
- Propulsion: Sail

Hashemy (or Hashmy, or Hashimy), was a teak-built vessel launched at Calcutta in 1817. She was originally a country ship, trading east of the Cape of Good Hope. In 1829 she made one voyage as a whaler in the Southern Whale Fishery. From 1846 on she made several voyages transporting people, notably coolies from India to British Guiana, and convicts to Australia. She was probably hulked in Bengal c.1867.

== Career ==
In 1819 Hashimy was registered at Calcutta with C.E.Smith, master, and Sayed Sadduck, owner. This information was unchanged in 1821, though the name of Hashimy's owner was given as Syed Saduck. In 1824 Hashmy's master was J.J. Denham, and her managing owner was Rustumjee & Co. In 1825 she was sold for a free trader.

Hashemy entered Lloyd's Register (LR) in 1829. She had undergone small repairs in 1829.

Year	Master	Owner	Trade	Source
1829	Cook	Templer	London–South Seas	LR

Hashemy sailed in November 1829 with John Cook, master, on a whaling voyage, bound for Timor. She was reported at various times to have been at Coupang, Guam, Kosrae, and New Zealand. Cook drowned at some point before May 1831. Hashemy was at Sydney on 5 April 1831. It was reported in the press she, "has put into port to procure a captain, her master having been struck out of the stern sheets, of a boat by the tail of a whale, and never seen afterwards." Command of the vessel was then given to Captain John Barker Harwood. In Sydney, 100 tuns of her sperm whale oil and headmatter were sold for £60 a tun, an amount, "equal to that obtained in the London market." While Hashmy was coming from Japan, Harwood discovered an atoll that he named the Hashmy Group. This probably occurred in 1832. The atoll is now known as Namoluk Atoll.

Hashemy arrived at Sydney again on 3 February 1833. The Sydney Gazette and New South Wales Advertiser reported on 7 March that Hashmy had been engaged to carry the oils of Nimrod and Australian to London. Hashemy, Harford Arnold, master, sailed from Sydney on 2 May, bound for England with a cargo of colonial produce. Contrary winds then delayed her departure by two days.

Lloyd's Register for 1834 showed Hashemy with Hatfield, master, Templer, owner, and trade London–India.

Year	Master	Owner	Trade	Source
1835	Hatfield; Hyde	Templer; Hyde	London–India; London–China	
1840	Buckle	Hyde	London–Madras	
1845	Buckle; Ross	Hyde & Co. Heath & Co.	London–Calcutta	LR; damages repaired in 1844
1846	Ross	Heath & Co. Ross & Co.	London–Calcutta; London	LR; damages repaired in 1844

Ross, Corbett and Co., acquired Hashemi in 1846. Captain John Ross may have been a part-owner as well. The new owners converted Hashemy to a barque. Thereafter she made several voyages transporting people, first coolies from India to British Guiana, and then convicts and settlers from England to Australia.

On 9 September 1846 Hashemy sailed from Madras to British Guiana with 283 coolies, of whom 226 were men, and the rest women and children. All survived the voyage. She delivered over 50 to New Bendorff on 5 December.

Hashemy, Captain John Ross, sailed from Portsmouth on 11 February 1849. She arrived at Sydney on 9 June. She had embarked 237 male convicts, 16 of whom died on the voyage. She landed 221. By some accounts she sailed via Hobart, where she landed 29 Parkhurst apprentices and in May had stopped at Port Phillip. However, subsequent research has revealed that Hashemi never stopped at Port Phillip, and was not even turned away.

On 22 July 1850 Captain Ross sailed Hashemy from Portland. She arrived in Western Australia on 25 October. She had embarked 100 male convicts and she landed all of them. She was the second vessel, after Scindian, to deliver convicts to Western Australia. Captain Ross contracted with the Government to purchase 533 tons of guano at a modified price. In return Ross did not charge the Government for a considerable quantity of Government freight that Hashemy carried to Shark Bay. While in Shark Bay exploring for guano, Ross also mapped the area.

Hashemy eventually left for London. She arrived at Gravesend on 17 August 1851.

Year	Master	Owner	Trade	Source
1850	J. Ross	Ross & Co.		LR
1854	J. Ross	Ross & Co.		LR

Hashemi was listed in Lloyd's Register until 1854, but with data that had been stale since 1850. However, in 1857 she reappeared with H. Boys, master, Beatson & Co., owners, and trade London–Mediterranean. By 1860 her trade was Cardiff–South America. The last entry for her, with unchanged data, is from 1866.

== Fate ==
The last online mention of a Hashemy is from 1868. In 1862 the British built Port Canning on the Matla River in Bengal. On 1–2 November 1867 a cyclone hit the Calcutta area, doing significant damage. The storm's greatest damage occurred at Port Canning where a 5-foot (1.5 m) storm surge destroyed many buildings. A report stated that the Port Canning Company's store hulk Hashemy had carried away a great portion of the railway jetty. Although it has not been possible to verify that the Hashemy last listed in Lloyd's Register in 1866 is the Hashemy caught up in the cyclone in Bengal in 1867, the name is unique in the period.
