= Convict era of Western Australia =

19th-century historical period of Western Australia

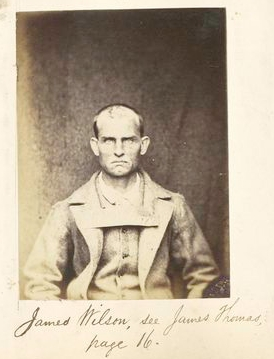
James Wilson, a convict transported to Western Australia in 1867

The convict era of Western Australia was the period during which Western Australia was a penal colony of the British Empire. Although it received small numbers of juvenile offenders from 1842, it was not formally constituted as a penal colony until 1849. Between 1850 and 1868, 9,721 convicts were transported to Western Australia on 43 convict ship voyages. Transportation ceased in 1868, at which time convicts outnumbered free settlers 9,700 to 7,300, and it was many years until the colony ceased to have any convicts in its care.

== Convicts at King George Sound ==
The first convicts to arrive in what is now Western Australia were convicts of the New South Wales penal system, sent to King George Sound in 1826 to help establish a settlement there. At that time, the western portion of Australia was unclaimed land known as New Holland. Fears that France would lay claim to the land prompted the Governor of New South Wales, Ralph Darling, to send Major Edmund Lockyer, with troops and 23 convicts, to establish the King George Sound settlement. Lockyer's party arrived on 25 December 1826. A convict presence was maintained at the settlement for nearly four years. In November 1830, control of the settlement was transferred to the Swan River Colony, and the troops and convicts withdrew.

== Free settlement to penal colony ==
In December 1828, the British Colonial Office agreed to establish a colony at Swan River in Western Australia. It then issued a circular outlining the conditions reedy which of settlement, which stated, "It is not intended that any convicts or other description of Prisoners, be sent to this new settlement." That Swan River Colony would not be a penal colony was highly attractive to many of the potential settlers, and the condition was mentioned often by promoters during the period of Swan River mania.

Swan River Colony was established as a "free settlement" in June 1829. Still, in early September the merchant vessel Anglesea grounded at Gage Roads, at the mouth of the Swan River. She did not break up, as had been expected, but instead survived to become Western Australia's first prison hulk.

For the first fifteen years, the people of the colony were generally opposed to accepting convicts, although the idea was in constant circulation almost from the start. Early in 1831, the Colonel Peter Latour asked permission to transport 300 Swing Riots convicts, but was refused. Nonetheless, the idea was under discussion later that year, with the Fremantle Observer editorialising on the need for convict labour, and George Fletcher Moore writing in his diary:

Mr. B. called yesterday [...]. He wants me to sketch a plan for employing prisoners, as a working gang; the Governor being anxious to occupy them in this way, if settlers will pay a superintendent.

In 1834, Captain Frederick Irwin suggested that the colony take in some Indian convicts for use as labour for the construction of public works. Towards the end of that year, a meeting of settlers at King George Sound passed a motion, signed by sixteen persons, that convict labour was needed for land clearing and road works, but this was met with little support in other parts of the colony. Three years later, a similar motion was considered but defeated by the Western Australian Agricultural Society.

=== Introduction of Parkhurst apprentices ===
Early in 1839, the Governor of Western Australia, John Hutt, received from the Colonial Office a circular asking if the colony would be prepared to accept juvenile prisoners who had first been reformed in "penitentiaries especially adapted for the purpose of their education and reformation". After seeking comment from the Western Australian Agricultural Society, Hutt responded that "the majority of the community would not object to boys not above 15 years of age", but that the labour market could not support more than 30 boys per year. 234 juvenile prisoners were subsequently transported from Parkhurst Prison to Western Australia between 1842 and 1849. These Parkhurst apprentices were then "apprenticed" to local employers.

As Western Australia was not yet a penal colony, contemporary documents scrupulously avoided referring to the Parkhurst apprentices as "convicts". Most historians have since maintained this distinction. An opposing view, held for example by Andrew Gill, is that the Parkhurst apprentices were convicts, and that their apprenticeships constituted convict assignment.

=== Agitation for convicts ===
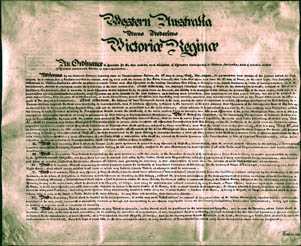
The first page of An Ordinance to provide for the due custody and discipline of Offenders transported to Western Australia; and of certain classes of Offenders sentenced therein to Transportation, 13 Vic No. 1

Serious lobbying for Western Australia to become a penal colony began in 1844, when members of the York Agricultural Society brought forward a motion stating:

That it is the opinion of this meeting that, inasmuch as the present land regulations have entirely destroyed our labour fund, we conceive that the Home Government are bound in justice to supply us with some kind of labour, and after mature deliberations we have come to the determination of petitioning the Secretary of State for the Colonies for a gang of forty convicts to be exclusively employed in public works.

Nothing concrete came of the motion, but James Battye nonetheless identifies it as a turning point:

The York agriculturalists, however, achieved something. They had directed the attention of the settlers toward the importation of convicts as a way out of their difficulties, and from that time, though strenuous opposition continued to be manifested, the advocates of convict labour steadily gained ground.

In 1845, no less than three memorials were circulated requesting the establishment of a penal colony in Western Australia. Two of them were aborted, but the third resulted in a petition by the York Agricultural Society to the Legislative Council on the subject. The York Agricultural Society, which consisted mostly of pastoralists, argued that the colony's economy was on the brink of collapse due to an extreme shortage of labour. Pamela Statham has examined these claims, and found that the colony was in fact oversupplied with labour at the time, the main obstacles to progress being a shortage of money capital, and the lack of markets for the colony's produce. Only in the pastoral sector was there a severe labour shortage. The York Agricultural Society can therefore be seen as an influential lobby group representing the interests of a small but influential minority.

The York Agricultural Society's 1845 petition was unanimously rejected by the Legislative Council, which stated:

the necessity for such an application is not apparent. No dearth of labour can be so extreme as to call for, or to warrant our having recourse to, such a hazardous experiment for a supply.

Over the following two years, however, the membership of the Council changed substantially. Three new members, Thomas Yule, Edward Barrett-Lennard and Rivett Henry Bland, were pro-convict pastoralists, giving the pastoralists a significant representation in Council. During 1846, the York Agricultural Society began circulating yet another petition. This petition appears to have convinced a substantial proportion of the colony of the merits of becoming a penal settlement. It obtained many signatures, and a number of newspapers began to support the idea. The petition was debated by the Legislative Council in July and August 1847; it was rejected, but forwarded to the British Colonial Office nonetheless. To address some of the problems raised by the petition, the Legislative Council took a number of decisions, one of which was to ask the British government to send out a small number of convicts for a limited term.

When the reports of the Council's debates on the introduction of convicts arrived in Britain in early 1848, the British government took great interest in them. By this time, the only British colonies still willing to accept convicts were Canada and Van Diemen's Land, and these only under protest. A tentative attempt to institute a penal system within England had caused a public outcry, and had been suspended. With nowhere to send its convicts, the numbers in British jails had increased until the situation had become urgent.

In July 1848, Charles Fitzgerald was appointed Governor of Western Australia. The issue of convicts was almost certainly discussed with Fitzgerald before he departed for Western Australia, and it is probable that he was instructed to promote convictism, as he took a strongly pro-convict stance throughout his governorship. On his arrival in Western Australia in August 1848, he presented the Colonial Office's reply to Western Australia's request. Britain had refused to send convicts for a fixed term, but offered to send out first offenders in the final years of their terms. This was readily agreed to by the original petitioners, and also attracted some wider public support.

Implicit in Britain's offer was the understanding that the Swan River Colony would not become a regular penal settlement, in which Britain retained responsibility for managing and funding the penal system. Rather, it would take full responsibility for the convicts that it accepted. In February 1849, a public meeting was held to discuss the issue, from which a majority view emerged in support of an alternative proposal put forward by Lionel Samson. Samson argued that the colony needed both labour and capital, and pointed out that under Britain's proposal the colony would effectively become a penal colony but would not receive the usual investment of capital from Britain. In March, Fitzgerald was able to tell the Colonial Office:

[Settlers] deprecate [...] receiving only Exiles or Ticket-of-leave men because Labour without Capital can do them no good and their conclusion therefore is to request that the Colony may be erected into a regular Penal settlement in the hope of a large consequent Expenditure.

Fitzgerald's message was received by the Colonial Office in July 1849. By that time, the Colonial Office had already acted to formally constitute Western Australia as a penal settlement. After receiving Fitzgerald's missive, the Colonial Office decided to send out about 100 convicts under the conditions of the original proposal. When news of this reached the Swan River Colony, the colonists protested that the original proposal was never agreed to by the majority of settlers. They demanded that the British Government either agree to fund the colony's convict establishment, or cancel altogether their plans to send convicts. Eventually the British Government agreed to the colonists' demands for funding, but since the expenditure was not warranted for only 100 convicts, it was decided to greatly increase the number of convicts sent.

== Convict era ==
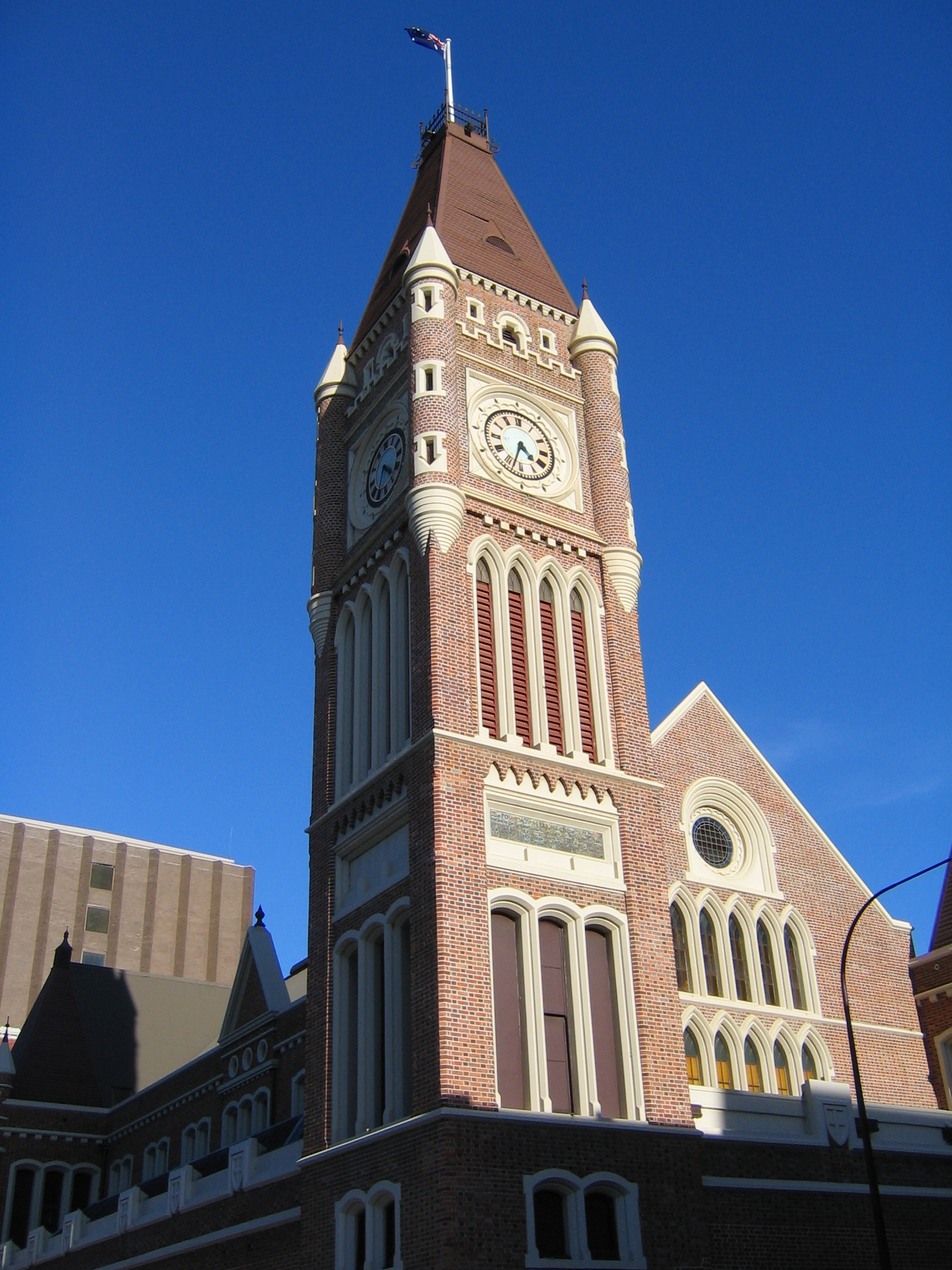
The Perth Town Hall, which was built with convict labour, incorporates a number of convict motifs, including windows in the shape of the broad arrow.

The first 75 convicts arrived in Fremantle on 1 June 1850. Daniel Scott, the harbour-master was able to rent out his wool warehouse as the only secure place to keep them. The convicts that had arrived on Scindian used Scott's warehouse as their only home until they had constructed their own convict establishment.

Between 1850 and 1868, 9721 convicts were transported to Western Australia on 43 convict ship voyages. At the request of the colony, convicts were initially selected for transportation in accordance with three conditions:

- that no female convicts be transported;
- that no political prisoners be transported; and
- that no convicts convicted of serious crimes be transported.

The first of these was honoured throughout the convict era; and the second until 1868, when the last convict ship to Western Australia, Hougoumont, was sent out with 62 Fenian prisoners on board. The third condition, that convicts not be convicted of serious crimes, was observed only for the first couple of years, and then only because the absence of a suitable jail would have made management of such convicts difficult. Later, more serious offenders were sent. It is a tradition that Western Australia's convicts were of a "better class" than those of Australia's other penal colonies, it has shown that this was not the case. Indeed, as Britain's penal system gradually reformed, it began to deal with more of its minor offenders at home, and therefore transported a higher proportion of serious offenders to Western Australia. From 1851 to 1853, as the number of convicts arriving in the colony increased the mood of the free population changed from popular support to one of great concern:

There were times indeed when Perth seemed to be a society under siege, with strengthened doors, fitted locks, restricted personal movement (especially for women and children), and over and above this nervousness and concern, the actual felt experience of personal violence, alienation, and degradation.

In November 1857, John Hutt, representing a number of business interests wrote to British Government to suggest the colony as a place to transport sepoys who had rebelled during the Indian Mutiny of that year. A number of public meetings were held in the colony to discuss the proposal which supported the proposal. The idea and the reaction of the colony to it received attention all over Australia and was ultimately rejected by the British Government.

=== Convict life ===
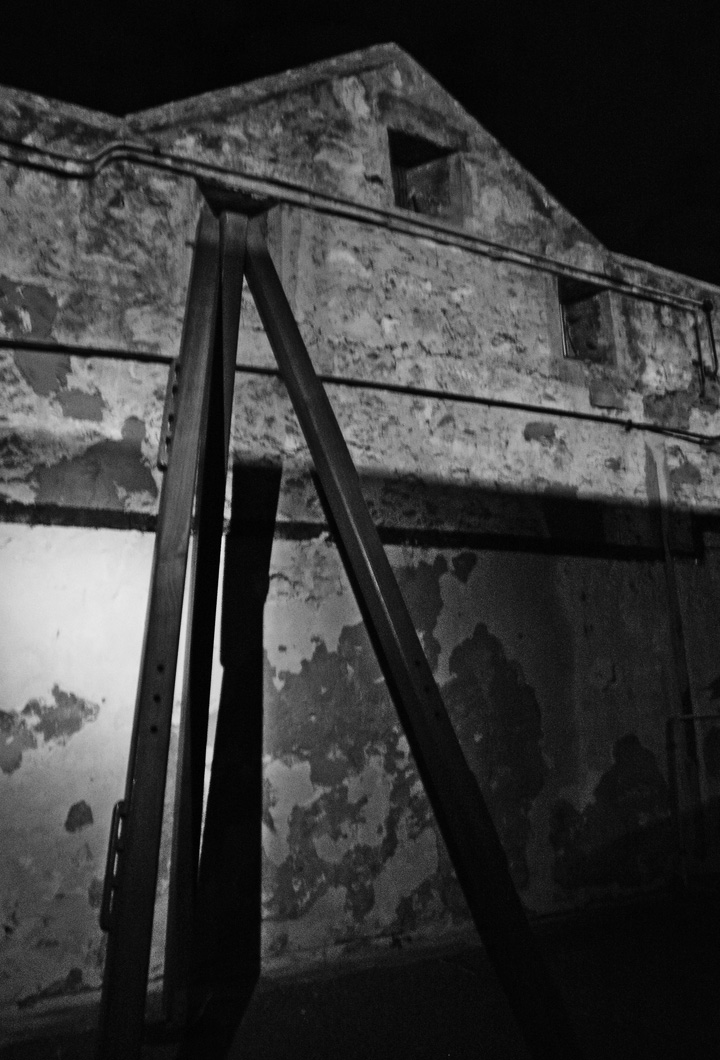
The Fremantle Prison whipping post

Most convicts in Western Australia spent very little time in prison. Those who were stationed at Fremantle were housed in the Convict Establishment, the colony's convict prison, and misbehaviour was punished by stints there. The majority of convicts, however, were stationed in other parts of the colony. Although there was no convict assignment in Western Australia, there was a great demand for public infrastructure throughout the colony, so that many convicts were stationed in remote areas. Initially, most convicts were set to work creating infrastructure for the convict system, including the construction of the Convict Establishment itself. Later, they were set to work on other public works, especially roads. In Perth, for example, convicts built the Perth Gaol between 1854 and 1856, and some were then housed there to provide labour for capital works in the city and surrounds. The Perth Town Hall and Government House and the Canning River Convict Fence are several of the notable landmarks built by convicts.

Since many convicts were stationed in work parties in remote locations, there were many opportunities for escape, and escapes did occur reasonably often. However, since the colony was surrounded by ocean and desert, it was almost impossible to leave the colony, and few escapees remained at large within the colony for long. On some occasions escapees surrendered to avoid starvation. Notable exceptions include Moondyne Joe, who remained at large in the colony for two years, and John Boyle O'Reilly with six fellow Fenian prisoners who escaped to the United States.

Convicts who were well-behaved could look forward to obtaining a ticket of leave well before the completion of their sentence. Ticket of leave men were permitted to work for money, but could not leave their assigned district and had few legal rights. After serving a period of time as a ticket of leave man, the convict might obtain a conditional pardon, which meant complete freedom except that they could not return to England.

The social stigma of conviction generally remained with ex-convicts throughout their lives, and to some extent affected their children too. Ex-convicts and their children rarely married into free settler families, for example. Although ex-convicts sometimes attained a position of social respectability by successful self-employment, for example as farmers or merchants, it was rare for them to obtain paid work other than unskilled menial labour. Government appointments were generally closed to them, with the notable exception of school teaching. A substantial number of ex-convict school teachers were appointed because educated free settlers were not attracted to the low salaries on offer.

== End to transportation ==
Western Australia's convict era came to an end with the cessation of penal transportation by Britain. In May 1865, the colony was advised of the change in British policy, and told that Britain would send one convict ship in each of the years 1865, 1866 and 1867, after which transportation would cease. In accordance with this, the last convict ship to Western Australia, Hougoumont, departed Britain in 1867 and arrived in Western Australia on 10 January 1868.

Western Australia objected strongly to the cessation of transportation, and, once it became clear that the decision would not be altered, pushed for compensation. Governor Weld wrote to the Secretary of State for the Colonies:

I do trust, my Lord, that you will bear in mind that this unfortunate colony has lost much in one sense by the introduction of convicts, lost again in another by the cessation of transportation, has not received the equivalent she had reason to expect when she sold her honour and is now struggling for existence under the pressure of the hand of Providence weighing on her in continued bad seasons, floods and tempests, whilst she has out of her poverty to support criminals, lunatics and paupers—the dregs of the cup she has drained.

Despite the colony's objections, Britain gradually began to wind the colony's penal system up, by reducing its expenditure and disposing of its assets. One by one the country convict depots were closed, and in 1872 the office of Comptroller General of Convicts was abolished. Much of the penal system's infrastructure was handed over to the colony, including the Convict Establishment, which became Fremantle Prison.

Although transportation ended in 1868, there were still 3,158 convicts in the system by the end of that year, and it took many years for these remaining convicts to die or receive their freedom. One of the best-known events of Western Australia's convict era, the Catalpa rescue, did not occur until 1876, eight years after the cessation of transportation.

== Later years ==
Effects of the convict era continued to be felt for many years. In 1874, Western Australia's Legislative Council lobbied the British government for responsible government but were refused, the grounds for refusal including that the proportion of ex-convicts in the colony was too high.

For many years following the cessation of penal transportation to Western Australia, that period of Western Australia's history was systematically ignored. Few historians chose to study the era, and some historians actively avoided it. For example, Hal Colebatch's centenary history of Western Australia, A Story of a Hundred Years, contains no mention of Western Australia's convict era. Moreover, the possession of convict ancestry was for many years considered shameful; persons with convict ancestry tended not to speak of it, so that later generations were often ignorant of this aspect of their ancestry. In recent times, however, the stigma associated with convict ancestry has evaporated, and for some people has even become a source of pride. There has been a surge in interest in convict history and genealogy throughout Australia.

== See also ==
- List of convict ship voyages to Western Australia
- Category:Convicts transported to Western Australia
- Catalpa rescue
- Convicts in Australia

== Sources ==
- Battye, James Sykes (1924), Western Australia: A History from its Discovery to the Inauguration of the Commonwealth, Oxford: Oxford University Press, ASIN B00086VAOQ, LCCN 25004763, OCLC 4362013, OL 50547304M, Wikidata Q133867108
- Goulding, Dot (2007). Recapturing Freedom: Issues Relating to the Release of Long-term Prisoners Into the Community. Hawkins Press. ISBN 978-1876067182.
- Hasluck, Alexandra (1959), Unwilling Emigrants: A study of the convict period in Western Australia, Melbourne: Oxford University Press, LCCN 61065535, OCLC 460594009, OL 5842666M, Wikidata Q7897821
