= Historical Encyclopedia of Western Australia =

Encyclopaedia of Western Australian history

- Editors: Jenny Gregory; Janice Gothard
- Language: English
- Subject: Western Australian history
- Genre: Encyclopaedia
- Publisher: UWA Publishing
- Publication date: 2009
- Publication place: Australia
- Pages: 1046
- ISBN: 978-1-921401-15-2
- OCLC: 405500003
- Website: UWA Research Repository

The Historical Encyclopedia of Western Australia (HEWA) from the Centre for Western Australian History at the University of Western Australia was published in June 2009. Although work on it started in 2003, the idea within the university for an historical encyclopaedia of Western Australia dates to the early 1990s.

== Context ==
Two comparable earlier works are Cyclopedia of Western Australia by James Battye in 1912–1913, and A New History of Western Australia by Tom Stannage in 1981.

In its introduction, the encyclopaedia suggests it

provides an outstanding reference for researchers, teachers, students and the general public that will enable them to locate information about significant events, institutions and places, themes and topics in the history of Western Australia.

— Jenny Gregory

Following publication of the encyclopaedia, an index, alphabetical list of entries and a list of errata known at the time was published in 2010 to complement the encyclopaedia. Hardcopies of the encyclopaedia were sold at the State Library of Western Australia, advertised in part as follows.

The Historical Encyclopedia of Western Australia has more than 300 contributors and through this collaboration has become the 'People's Encyclopedia' – a gift to the people of Western Australia from the historians of Western Australia.

Papers relevant to the preparation and composition of the work were deposited in the State Library of Western Australia in the 2000s.

In 2010 the encyclopaedia was shortlisted for the Western Australian Premier's Book Award.

== Contemporaneous volumes in Australia ==
In her introduction, Gregory places the publication with others from other states:

1. Oxford Companion to Australian History (1998),
2. Wakefield Companion to South Australian History (2001),
3. Companion to Tasmanian History (2005), and
4. Encyclopedia of Melbourne (2005).

== Publishing details ==
- Gregory, Jennifer Anne; Gothard, Janice, eds. (2009). Historical Encyclopedia of Western Australia (PDF). Crawley: UWA Publishing. ISBN 978-1-921401-15-2. OCLC 405500003. OL 45266821M. Wikidata Q5773872.
- Batt, Anne (2009), Historical Encyclopedia of Western Australia – Index (PDF), Crawley: UWA Publishing, OCLC 1058065211, Wikidata Q81506116

== See also ==
- Australian Dictionary of Biography
- Dictionary of Australian Biography
- J S Battye Library
- Western Australia Post Office Directory
- State Records Office of Western Australia
