= Cyclopedia of Western Australia =

Encyclopedia of Western Australia

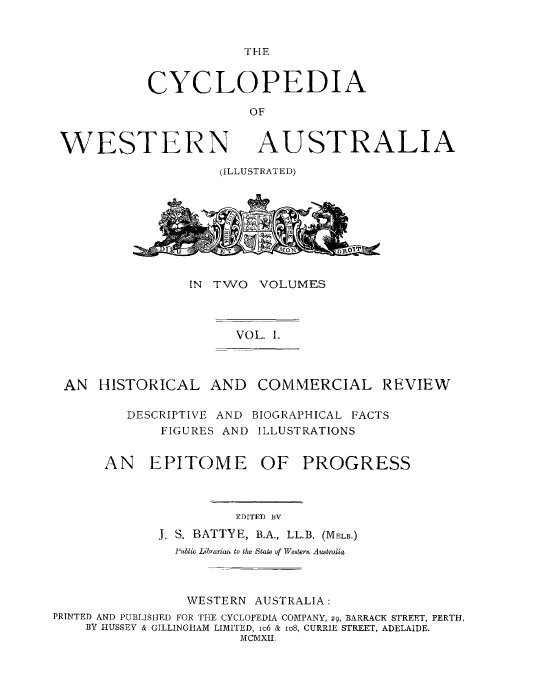
Frontispiece of Volume 1

The Cyclopedia of Western Australia, edited by James Battye, was the pre-eminent written summary of Western Australia's development and context prior to World War I.

== Review of progress ==
It was created at a time that saw progress, and was subtitled:

An historical and commercial review
Descriptive and biographical facts figures and illustrations

An Epitome of Progress

Contemporary reviews before and after publication reflected this sense. A similar review of the state of Western Australia appeared in publications at the centenary of the state in 1929.

== Publication details ==
Several editions have been produced.

- Battye, James Sykes, ed. (1912–1913). The Cyclopedia of Western Australia: An Historical and Commercial Review, Descriptive and Biographical Facts Figures and Illustrations: An Epitome of Progress (1st ed.). Adelaide: Hussey and Gillingham. OCLC 220346033. Wikidata Q131576638.
  - Battye, James Sykes, ed. (1912). Cyclopedia of Western Australia. Vol. 1. Adelaide: Hussey and Gillingham. OCLC 758407223. Wikidata Q125962577.
  - Battye, James Sykes, ed. (1913). Cyclopedia of Western Australia. Vol. 2. Adelaide: Hussey and Gillingham. OCLC 865820752. Wikidata Q125962586.
- Battye, James Sykes, ed. (1985). Cyclopedia of Western Australia. Carlisle: Hesperian Press. ISBN 0-85905-072-6. OCLC 216482115. OL 11654806M. Wikidata Q125966848.
  - Battye, James Sykes, ed. (1985). Cyclopedia of Western Australia. Vol. 1. Carlisle: Hesperian Press. ISBN 0-85905-073-4. Wikidata Q125967197.
  - Battye, James Sykes, ed. (1985). Cyclopedia of Western Australia. Vol. 2. Carlisle: Hesperian Press. ISBN 0-85905-074-2. Wikidata Q125967198.
- Battye, James Sykes, ed. (2007). Cyclopedia of Western Australia. Modbury: Archive CD Books Australia. ISBN 978-1-921081-38-5. OCLC 174095106. Wikidata Q125999346.

== Content ==
Volume 1

Aboriginals, Agriculture, Biographies, Commerce and Industry, Fauna and Flora, Geology, Government, History of Western Australia, Immigration, Tourism, Lands department, Medical, Fremantle, Perth, Police, The Press, Public services, Railways, Trans-Australian Railway, Shipping, Suburban Municipalities, Telegraph and Telephone, Trade and Customs, Woods and Forests.

Volume 2

Agriculture, Churches and Ecclesiastical, Caves of WA, Mining, Hospitals, Schools and Education, Country Districts, Cities and suburbs, Dairying, Farming, Institutions, Explorers and exploration, Political parties, Pearling, Biographical index, Sporting and recreation.

== See also ==
- Australian Dictionary of Biography
- Dictionary of Australian Biography
- Historical Encyclopedia of Western Australia
- J S Battye Library
- Western Australia Post Office Directory
- State Records Office of Western Australia
