= Esplanade Hotel, Perth =

Demolished hotel in Perth, Western Australia

Coordinates: 31°57′22″S 115°51′26″E

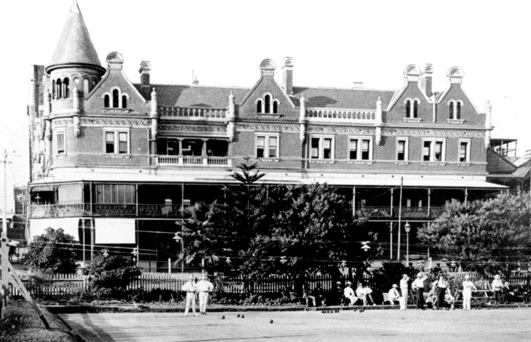
The Esplanade Hotel in the 1920s

The Esplanade Hotel (Note: Often referred to as the Old Esplanade Hotel to differentiate from the later New Esplanade Hotel.) was a hotel on The Esplanade across from Esplanade Reserve in Perth, Western Australia. Its demolition in 1972 was controversial because of the building's beauty and popularity.

Its early history appears in James Sykes Battye's 1912 Cyclopedia of Western Australia. Various proprietors owned the property over time, including N. W. Harper, who sold it in 1927 to J. Paxton, whose daughter Elsie May Plowman became sole licensee in 1957.

It was located opposite the Perth Bowling Club on the Esplanade Reserve.

The hotel was one of nine in the Perth area to have orders to remove its verandahs in 1962 but its owner Elsie May Plowman responded with a successful court action against the Perth City Council regulation.
