= Charles Ellery =

Australian bootmaker

Charles George Ellery (6 June 1854 – 5 June 1937) was an Australian bootmaker who worked for the city of Toodyay in Western Australia. Ellery was assisted for a time by his brother James, and then his daughter Constance who continued the family business after his death in 1937. His name is associated with his home, known as the Shoemaker's House, and shop, known as Ellery's Arcade. He was one of the Toodyay's civic leaders sitting on a number of boards and committees.

== Early life ==
Charles George Ellery was born in Perth on 6 June 1854 to William Charles and Sophia (née Dent), reputed to be the first female baby to be born to a settler in the Swan River Colony. Charles’ father William Charles Ellery was an American sailor who jumped ship at Fremantle. He married Sophia in 1847 and the couple had five boys, William, James, Charles George, Frederick, and Andrew, and a girl Amy Ann. The father obtained work as an engineer working on steamboats on the Swan River, but died in February 1860 after being scalded when the Lady Stirling exploded. The public took pity on the young widow and raised funds for the family through a subscription.

== Toodyay ==
The following year Sophia married William Mitchell and soon after this the family moved to Toodyay where Sophia gave birth to three more children. Charles George Emery was eight years of age when they arrived. As a youth Charles worked as a sawyer, then in 1872 when he was about 18 years of age he started his own business as a bootmaker, a profession he followed for the rest of his life. His brother Frederick worked for Mr J Monger before heading north to eventually establish himself in the Irwin district.

In 1878, Charles entered local politics, and on 8 June 1880 he married Louisa Boyer at the church in Culham. The couple had seven children including Constance who learnt the boot making trade. During this time Charles joined the town's brass band, which performed under the guidance of local miller Charles Marris, a staunch supporter of the temperance movement. The band performed at functions, dances, and fund-raisers, and led the temperance processions through town. Charles may have rented the premises, known today as Shoemaker House, from Daniel Connor, before buying the building. Connor, an expiree who came to Toodyay as a peddler, had a sharp nose for business and acquired a number of lots when the town of Newcastle was established in 1860. He was the first to build cottages and shops along the main street, which he rented out and later sold when his interests turned to the better investment possibilities of Perth.

Around 1887-88, Charles and his brother James started investing in land around the new recreation grounds in North Newcastle. It had been anticipated that once the Clackline to Newcastle railway line was completed it would continue across the river and make its way up the Toodyay Valley. Barnard Drummond Clarkson who owned the land had one acre lots surveyed. James Ellery bought seven lots and in 1888 built the first three cottages in North Newcastle, (two of these are Donegan's cottage and Parker's cottage). Charles bought one lot, and in partnership with Daniel Connor and William George Leeder another 11 lots. While Charles may have run a very successful business as a bootmaker, it could be surmised that James, a bachelor, was a contributor to the family's fortunes. Apart from working with Charles for a while, and apparently as a cabinetmaker in Newcastle in 1886, during the 1880s most of his time was spent in Cossack where he had a schooner and was involved in the pearling industry.

After the turn of the century Charles became increasingly involved with the town. In 1901 he was a member of the inaugural Newcastle Board of Health, served on the Toodyay Road Board from 1903–05, and was a member of the Toodyay Municipal Council for 25 years. In 1906 he became a member of the Newcastle Vigilance Group that sought to promote improvements to Toodyay. He was part of the campaign to extend the railway, improve health services and the town's water supply.

=== Ellery legacy ===
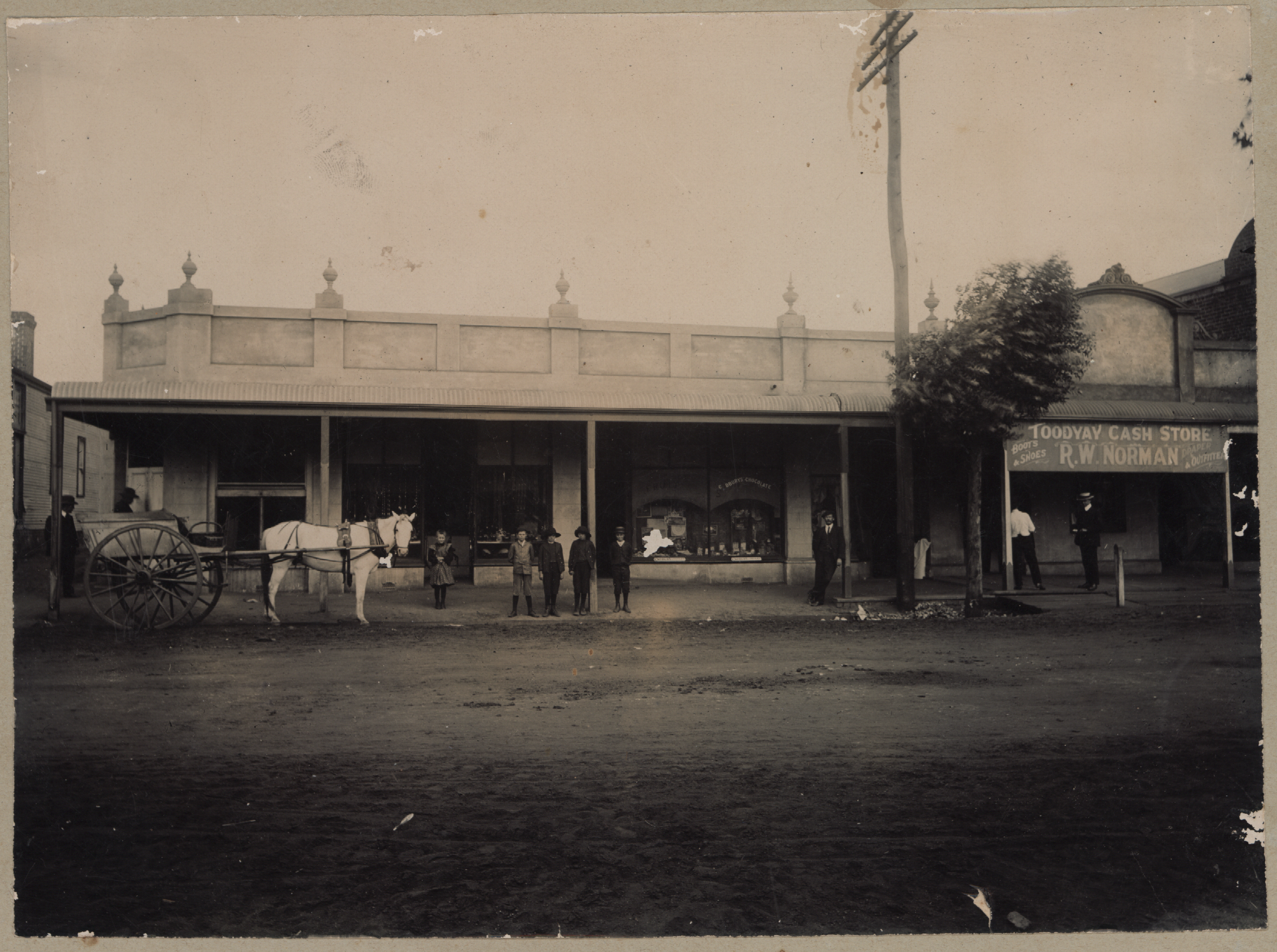
Ellery's Buildings, Toodyay c1910s

In 1902 Charles began investing in property next to the Freemason's Hotel. Eventually the stretch of shops along this section from the hotel became known as Ellery's Arcade, although not all the shops were owned by Ellery.

When Charles died on 5 June 1937, (Note: Various accounts give C G Ellery’s date of death as 5 and 6 June 1937) his daughter Constance, a spinster, continued the family business until her death in 1968. Many locals have fond memories of Aunty Connie who repaired their school shoes and she was well regarded for the quality of her work. She was also a skilled cake decorator.

She made all the special cakes for the town from a room at the back of Shoemaker House.

— Shirley Patten (Note: Discussion between Shirley Patten and Robyn Taylor, 8 November 2015.)

In 1933 she made a magnificent triple-decked cake for Toodyay's centenary celebrations that was put on display in the front window of the Wendouree Tearooms. The cake was decorated with black swans, sheep, fruit, flowers, Union Jacks and 100 candles. In 1955 she made a cake for Eric and Shirley Patten's wedding. Shirley recalls Connie as a small, quiet lady with a sense of purpose about her and always wearing an apron when she was working.

== Notes ==
=== Additional sourcing ===
- Bicentennial Dictionary of Western Australians - online.
- Erickson, Rica, Old Toodyay and Newcastle, Toodyay Shire Council, 1974.
- Twentieth Century Impressions of Western Australia, Perth, WA, Thiel, P.W.H. & Co., 1901. Facsimile edition produced by Hesperian Press, 2000.
- Obituary, Toodyay Herald, 25 June 1937, p. 1.
