= Alexander Library Building =

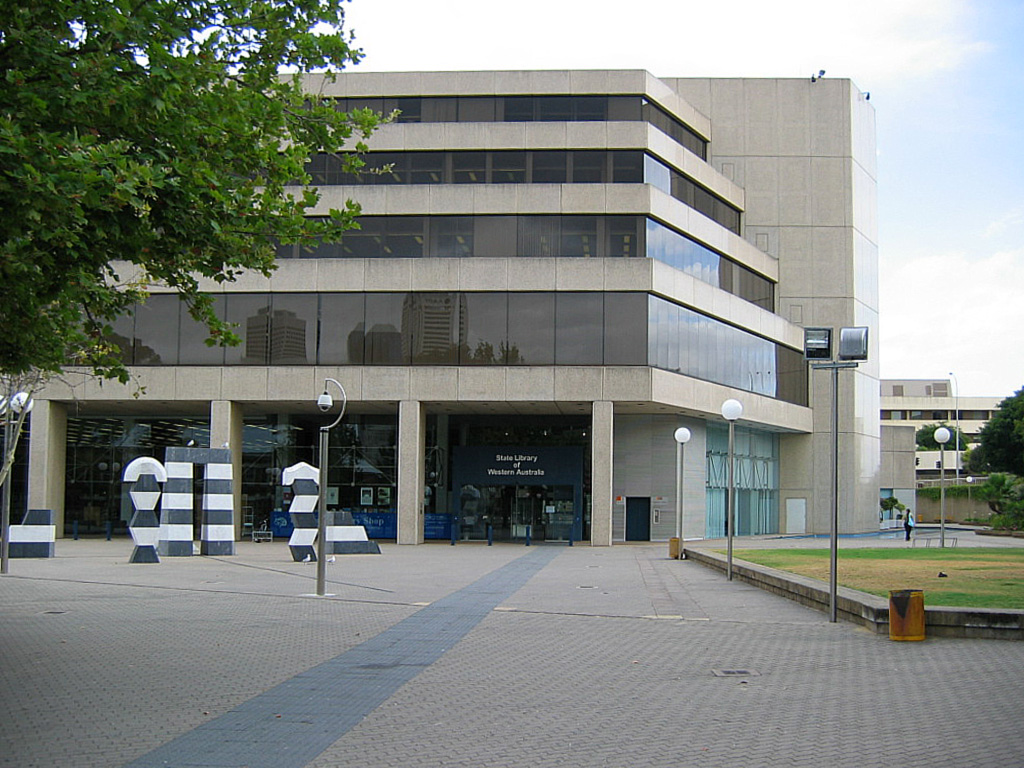
- Front entrance of Alexander Library Building
- Interactive map of the Alexander Library Building area

General information
- Status: Completed
- Type: Library
- Location: Between James Street Mall and Francis Street, Perth, 25 Francis Street, Perth, Perth, Australia
- Coordinates: 31.948822°S 115.860565°E
- Current tenants: State Library of Western Australia; State Records Office
- Construction started: 1982
- Completed: 1985
- Opened: 18 June 18 June 1985; 41 years ago
- Cost: A$37.6M
- Landlord: Government of Western Australia

Design and construction
- Architecture firm: Cameron, Chisholm and Nicol
- Structural engineer: Norman, Disney and Young

The Alexander Library Building is located in the Cultural Centre of Perth, Western Australia.

It was named after Western Australian historian and former member of the Library Board, Fred Alexander.

It houses the State Library of Western Australia, the J S Battye Library, and the State Records Office, in the Perth Cultural Precinct.

The building falls under the responsibility of the Western Australian government Department of Culture and Arts. It was completed and opened in 1985.

It has been changed internally over time, however the basic structure remains.

== Earlier landscape ==
The sloped walkway just east of the building runs roughly along the alignment of the old Museum Street, which ran between James Street and Francis Street. The street had a unique streetscape, one of the most mixed in this area of the Perth central business district – which was all removed in the construction of the new library building.

Only one building is commemorated on the Alexander Library Building structure – the Perth Baptist Church which was in Museum Street from 1899 to 1979. The Theosophical Bookshop and library was long established at the corner of Museum and James Streets. The streetscape can be found in Wise's Directories for the earlier decades.

== Plaques at entrance ==
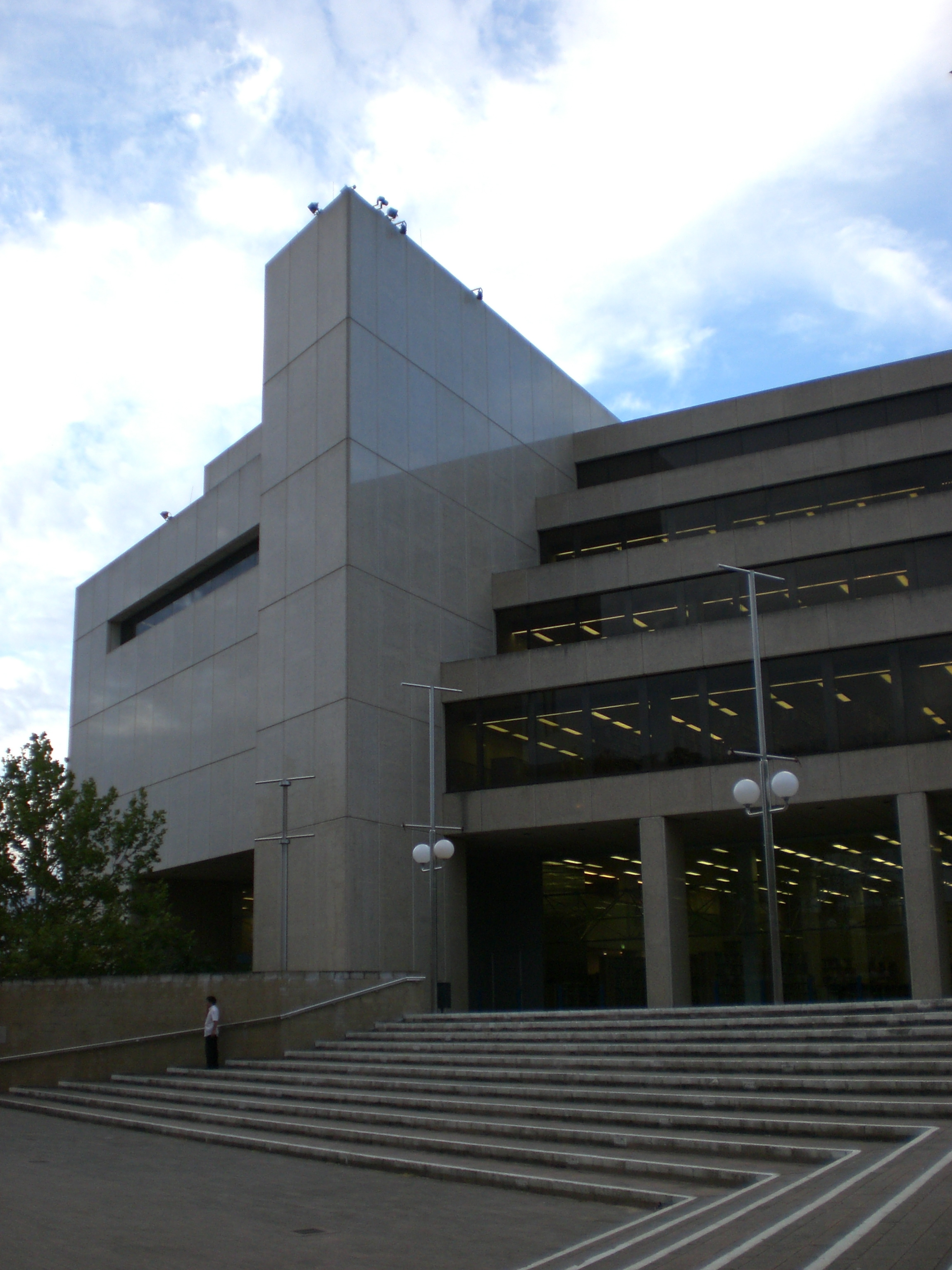
View from the steps on James Street

- 30 November 1979 – Commencement of Construction
- 18 June 1985 – Opening of Building
