= Margaret Medcalf =

Australian archivist (born 1926)

Margaret Lois Medcalf OAM
- Born: 26 March 1926 (age 100); Albany, Western Australia
- Education: University of Western Australia
- Occupation: Archivist
- Years active: 1955–1989
- Employer: State Records Office of Western Australia
- Relatives: Ian Medcalf (brother)

Margaret Lois Medcalf OAM (born 26 March 1926) is a former Western Australian State Archivist and namesake of the annual Margaret Medcalf Award.

== Early life ==
Margaret Medcalf was born on 26 March 2026, and grew up in Albany, Western Australia. Her father Ferdinand George Medcalf was a soldier who fought during World War I. After he returned to Australia in 1917 he married his fiance Rita Fry and they settled in Albany. They had three children, a son Ian Medcalf and two daughters Joy and Margaret.

Medcalf attended Park Primary School in Albany, and completed her secondary education in Perth. In 1950, she received a Diploma of Education at University of Western Australia.

== Career ==
During the 1950s, Medcalf worked within the archives department at the Australian embassy in The Hague, Netherlands. She returned to Perth, Australia in 1955 where she worked at what is now the State Records Office of Western Australia. While there, Medcalf played an important role in preserving records relating to Indigenous Australians. She became the State archivist in 1971, as well as Principal Librarian of the Battye Library. She retired in 1989.

In 2003, the Margaret Medcalf Award was founded recognising excellence by those referencing and researching with State Archives.

== Later life ==
Medcalf turned 100 on 26 March 2026.

== Awards and honours ==
In 1986, Margaret Medcalf was made a Fellow of the Library Association of Australia.

In 1989, she was made an Honorary Member of the Australian Society of Archivists.

In 1999, she received the medal of the Order of Australia for services to preserving history.

In 2014, she was inducted into the Western Australia Women's Hall of Fame.
