= Twentieth Century Impressions =

English book series (1901–1914)

Twentieth Century Impressions was a series of travel, political and social reference books published by Lloyds Greater Britain Publishing Company in London between 1901 and 1914. The full titles were typically styled as Twentieth Century Impressions of [country name] : Its history, people, commerce, industries and resources.

Arnold Wright (1858–1941) was editor in chief or author of most of the range of titles. In most cases the books were over 600 pages in length (some over 800). Wright was an enthusiast for colonialism, in the decade before the First World War. In most of the earlier volumes, H. A. Cartwright and O. Breakspear were assistants. In the volumes closer to 1914, Wright was designated as the Historian for a volume. Reginald Lloyd was also designated as Director in Chief of the later publications.

== Argentina ==
The Argentina title was published in 1911 - Twentieth Century Impressions of Argentina. Its history, people, commerce, industries, and resources. Director-in-Chief: Reginald Lloyd ... Editors: W. Feldwick ... Oliver T. Breakspear, L. T. Delaney ... Historian: Arnold Wright. [With illustrations.] London : Lloyd's Greater Britain Publishing Co.

== Brazil ==
The Brazil title was published in 1913 Twentieth century impressions of Brazil : its history, people, commerce, industries, and resources. Director-in-Chief: Reginald Lloyd ... Editors: W. Feldwick ... L. T. Delaney ... Historian: Arnold Wright. [With illustrations.] London : Lloyd's Greater Britain Publishing Co.

== Burma ==
The Burma title was first published in 1910, and reprinted in 2015 by White Lotus Press in Thailand.

== Canada ==
Twentieth century impressions of Canada; its history, people, commerce, industries, and resources by Henry J. Boam was published in 1914.

== Ceylon ==
The Ceylon (Sri Lanka) title was first published in 1907.

== Egypt ==
The title about Egypt is dated 1901 - Twentieth Century Impressions of Egypt. Its history, people, commerce, industries and resources. Editor in chief: A. Wright ... Assistant editor: H. A. Cartwright. [With illustrations.] London : Lloyd's Greater Britain Publishing Co.

== Hong Kong, Shanghai and Treaty Ports ==
The spread of the 1908 title was beyond Hong Kong and included Shanghai and other treaty ports such as Japan, Taiwan, and Korea. A manuscript copy of this book is held at the National Library of Australia.

== Netherlands East Indies ==
In 1909, the volume about the Netherlands East Indies (Indonesia) was published.

== British Malaya ==
The British Malaya (Malaysia) title was published in 1908. It has been reprinted in an abridged facsimile form by Brash

== Siam ==
The Siam (Thailand) book was originally published in London in 1903, with a reprint in 1908.

== Uruguay ==
The Uruguay Book was published in 1912 - Twentieth Century Impressions of Uruguay. Its history, people, commerce, industries, and resources. Director-in-Chief: Reginald Lloyd ... Editors: W. Feldwick ... L. T. Delaney ... Historian: Arnold Wright. London : Lloyd's Greater Britain Publishing Co., 1912.

== Western Australia ==
In Western Australia, the publisher was also the author - P.W.H Thiel.

It was extensively reviewed.

A digitised version is available from the NLA. It was also reprinted by Hesperian Press in 2000.

== West Indies ==
The last in the series appears to be the West Indies title - Twentieth Century Impressions of the West Indies. Their history, people, commerce, industries, and resources. Director-in-chief: Reginald Lloyd ... Editors: W. Feldwick ... L. T. Delaney ... Historian: José Plá Cárceles.London : Lloyds Greater Britain Publishing Co., 1914.

== Dropping of Twentieth Century.. ==
In 1914, there is record of Wright being involved in the publishing of a book with only the second part of the title of earlier series; - Southern India: its history, people, commerce, and industrial resources compiled by Somerset Playne, assisted by J.W. Bond. Edited by Arnold Wright:London, 1914-1915.
