= Ellery's Arcade =

Group of shops in Toodyay, Western Australia

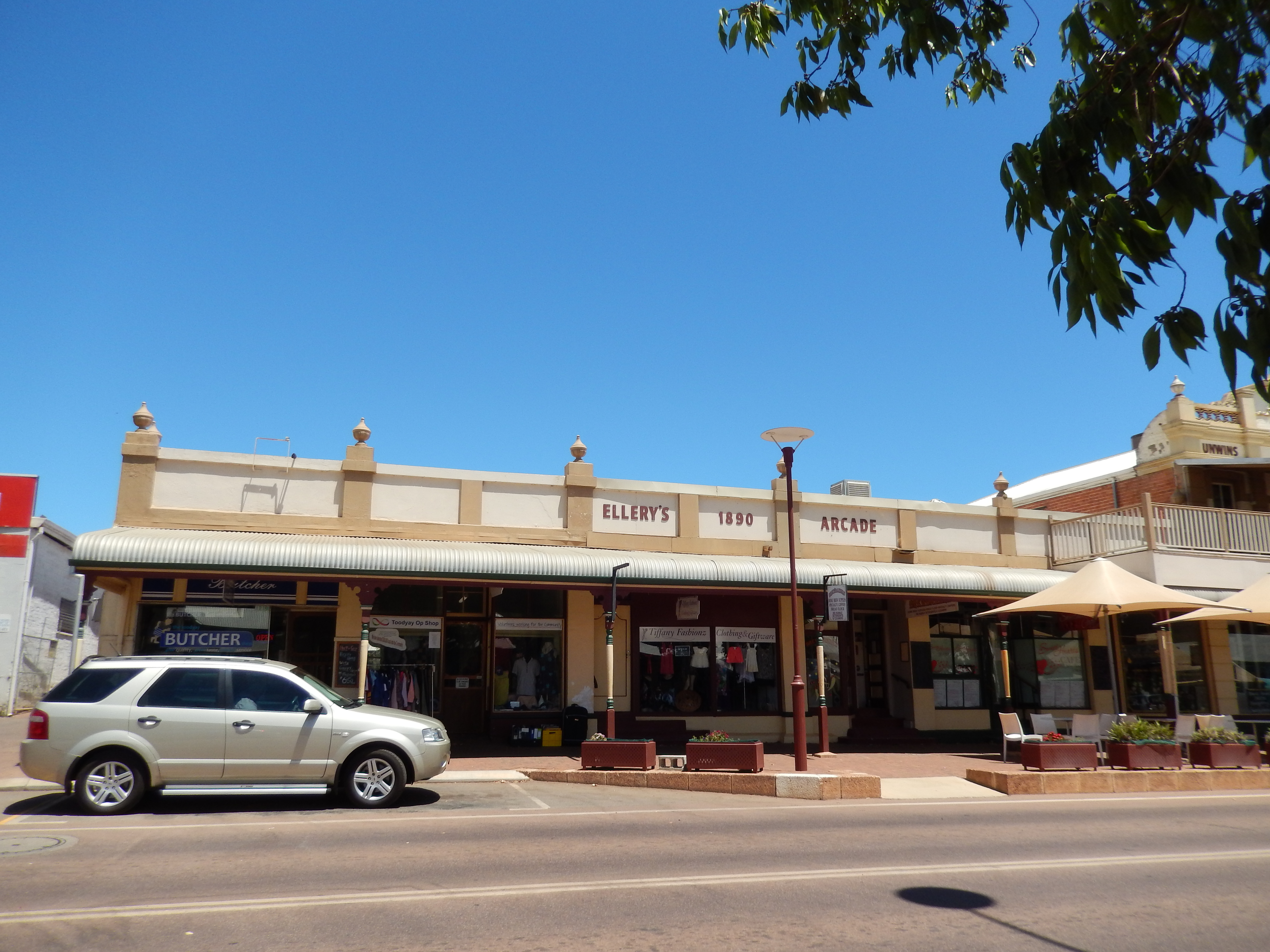
- Interactive map of the Ellery's Arcade area
- Former names: Ellery's Buildings

General information
- Architectural style: Victorian Classical
- Location: 121 Stirling Terrace, Toodyay
- Coordinates: 31.5503°S 116.4664°E
- Construction started: 1882
- Completed: 1907

References
- Toodyay municipal inventory

Ellery's Arcade on Stirling Terrace, Toodyay, Western Australia comprises six shops, which were built at various times.

The first three shops were constructed over the period 1882 to 1891 by Jane Donegan; one of them she ran as a boarding house named "Mount View". After Donegan's death in 1901, Charles Ellery purchased the shops and by 1907 had filled in the gaps with another three shops. The group at that time became known as Ellery's Buildings.

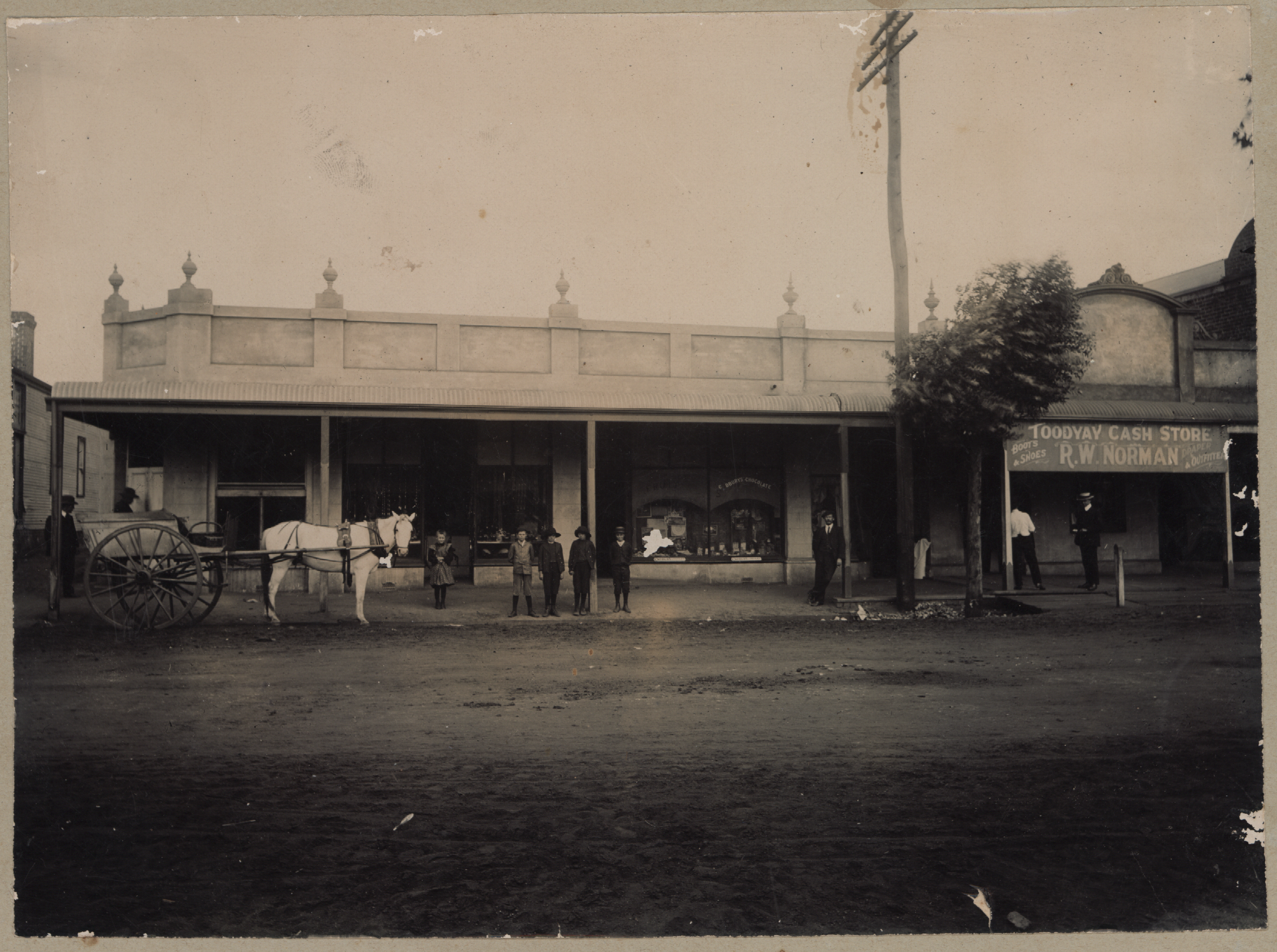
Ellery's Buildings, Toodyay circa 1910s

The row of six shops is of rendered brick construction with an iron roof. The parapet has been divided by pilasters adorned with urn finials. The bullnose verandah canopy is supported on turned timber columns. The shops all have different style frontages. The butcher's shop has always been so, but the other shops have had a variety of businesses: saddlers, café, pharmacy, tailors, printers and grocers.

The next building to the west along Stirling Terrace is Urwin's Store.
