= Izzy Orloff =

Australian photographer

Izzy Orloff (1891–1983), also known as Abraham Orloff, was a photographer in Fremantle, Western Australia.

His photographs make up one of the larger collections of images of early Perth in Battye Library photographic collection. Orloff's main efforts in photography were made between 1917 and 1935, providing an extensive collection of images of Perth through a range of topics and subjects. He also was interested in maritime subjects.
