= Major Logue =

Australian politician

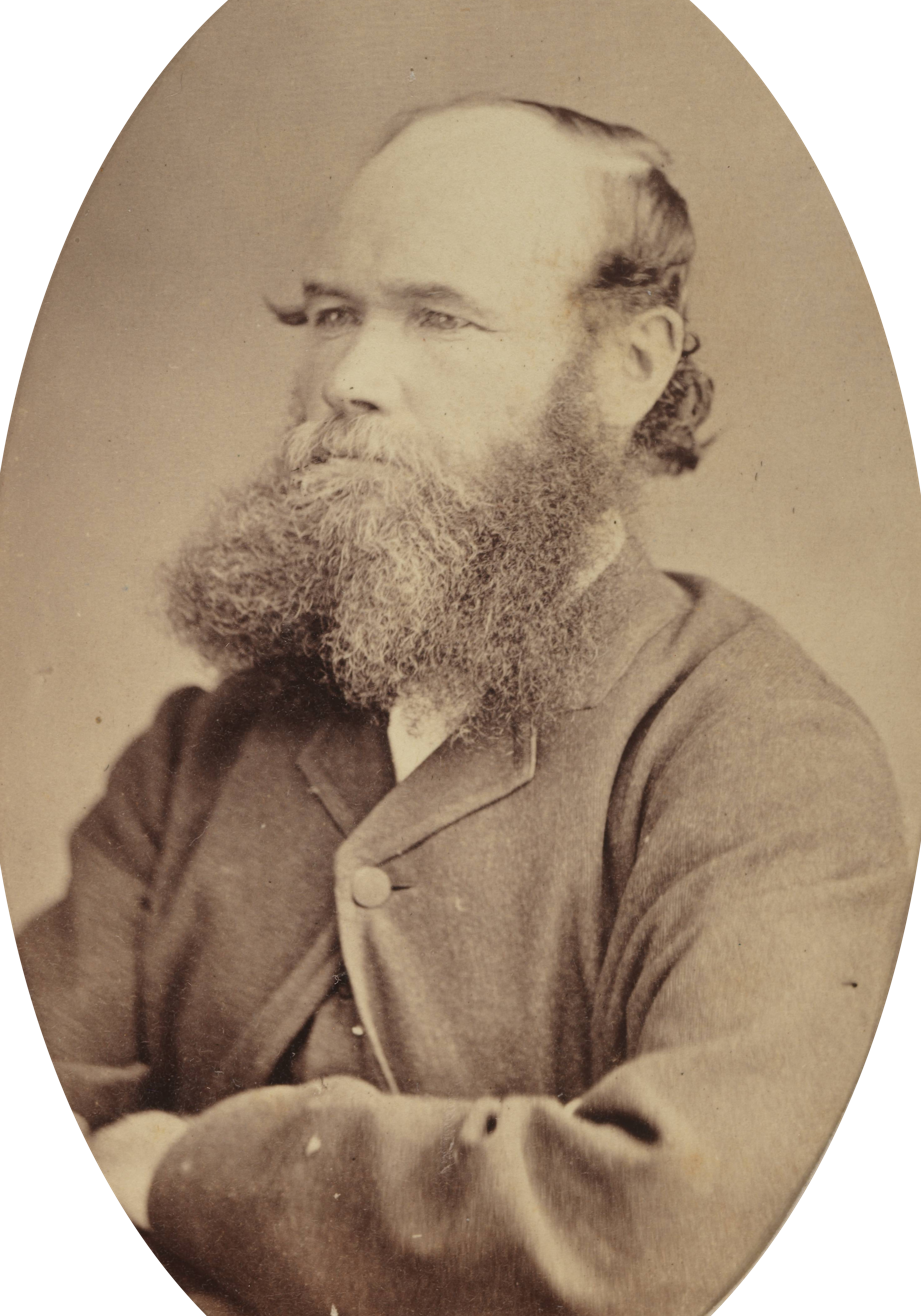
- c. 1870

Member of the Legislative Council of Western Australia
- In office 11 October 1870 – 29 September 1874
- Preceded by: None (new seat)
- Succeeded by: Maitland Brown
- Constituency: Geraldton

Personal details
- Born: c. 1826 Derry, Ireland
- Died: 1 February 1900 Greenough, Western Australia, Australia

Major Logue (c. 1826 – 1 February 1900) was an early settler of Western Australia.

Born in Ireland, he arrived in the colony as a child, and eventually settled on a pastoral property near Geraldton. Logue served in the Legislative Council of Western Australia from 1870 to 1874. He was involved in the killings of at least 19 Aboriginal people.

== Biography ==
Logue was born in Derry, Ireland, to Elizabeth (née Goodwin) and Joseph Keys Logue. He arrived in Western Australia in 1837, travelling with his parents onboard Hero. In 1850, Logue overlanded stock from York to Geraldton, subsequently setting up as a pastoralist near Greenough on land belonging to the Yamatji people. He named his new property Ellendale, and remained there for the rest of his life. Logue entered parliament in 1870, as one of the Legislative Council's first elected representatives. He represented the seat of Geraldton until September 1874, when he resigned. Logue made two unsuccessful attempts to re-enter parliament in the 1890s, running in the seat of Greenough at the 1894 and 1897 general elections. He died at Ellendale in February 1900, of apoplexy. He had married Lucy Ellen Shaw in 1856, with whom he had four sons and five daughters.

== Murders ==
Logue kept a diary for fifty years, in which he recounts his involvement in the shooting and killing of at least 19 Yamatji people. The passages relating to killings of Aboriginal people are concealed with a simple pigpen cipher. According to Geraldton-based historian Nan Broad, it is likely that Logue also took part in the massacre at Bootenal in 1854 in which at least 30 Aboriginal people were massacred by colonists led by John Nicol Drummond, Logue’s brother-in-law. However, the diaries make no mention of this event.

An edition of the diaries was, as of 2025, scheduled to be published by Hesperian Press, excluding the sections relating to Logue's murders of Aboriginal people.
