= Perth Central Baptist Church =

Church in Perth, Australia

- Perth Central Baptist Church
- 31°56′57″S 115°51′38″E
- Address: Perth, Western Australia
- Country: Australia
- Previous denomination: Baptist

History
- Status: Church (1899 – 1979)
- Consecrated: 1899

Architecture
- Functional status: Demolished
- Architect: James Hine
- Architectural type: Church
- Completed: 1899
- Construction cost: £1,500 (A$270,400 in 2022)
- Demolished: 1979

Specifications
- Capacity: 350 people

The Perth Central Baptist Church was a Baptist church building in Perth, Western Australia. The church was completed in 1899 and demolished in 1979 to make way for the Alexander Library Building. The foundation stone for the church was incorporated into the library building.

The church was officially opened on 5 May 1899.
