= State Library of Western Australia =

State library in Perth, Western Australia

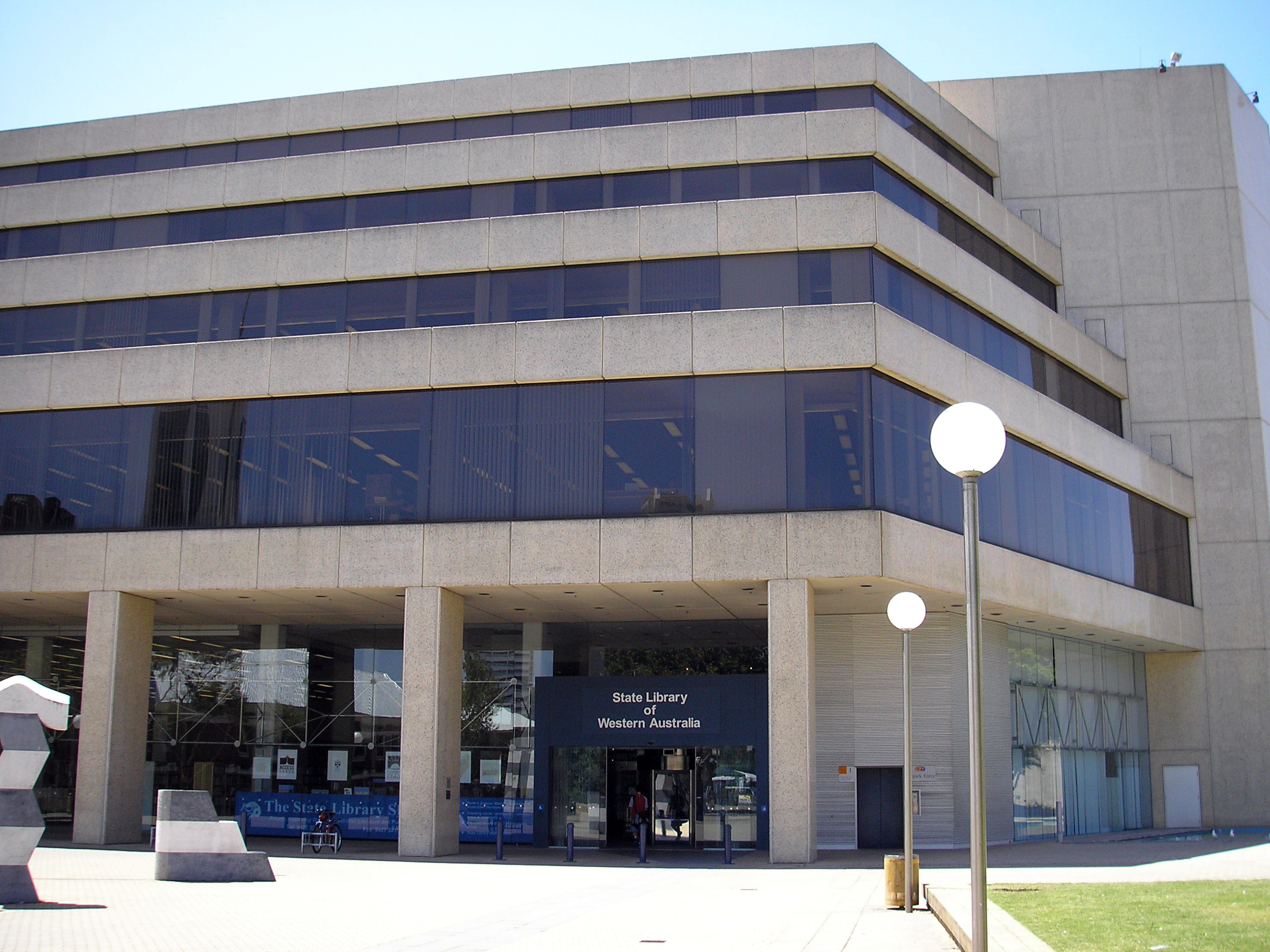
- State Library of Western Australia, Alexander Library Building
- 31°56′57″S 115°51′38″E
- Location: Perth, Western Australia
- Type: State Library
- Established: 1889; 137 years ago

Collection
- Items collected: Books, journals, newspapers, magazines, manuscripts, personal papers, maps, printed music, sound and music recordings, oral histories, films, photographs and ephemera
- Size: 1.5 million items; 4,000 linear metres (13,000 ft) of archives

Other information
- Director: Catherine Clark (CEO and State Librarian)
- Website: slwa.wa.gov.au

The State Library of Western Australia (SLWA) is a research, education, reference and public lending library located in the Perth Cultural Centre in Perth, Western Australia. It is a portfolio agency of the Western Australia Department of Local Government, Sport and Cultural Industries, and facilitated by the Library Board of Western Australia.

SLWA has particular responsibility for collecting, preserving and digitising Western Australia's heritage materials. The J. S. Battye Library of West Australian History is the section of SLWA dedicated to Western Australian historical materials.

== History ==
In 1886, the Western Australian Legislative Council allocated £5000, equivalent to A$748,000 in 2022, to be spent in celebrations for Queen Victoria's golden jubilee. Of this, it was decided that £3000 would be used to establish a free public library in Perth. A foundation stone was laid at a site in St Georges Terrace in 1887, however due to the lack of funds this site was not built upon. Instead, books to the value of £1000 were ordered from England, and the library found temporary accommodation in a building opposite the site. The Victoria Public Library, named in honour of Queen Victoria, opened on 26 January 1889. The first managers of the library were the clerks to the management committee, W. C. Townsend and then Basil Porter. The first Chief Librarian, James Sykes Battye, was appointed in 1894.

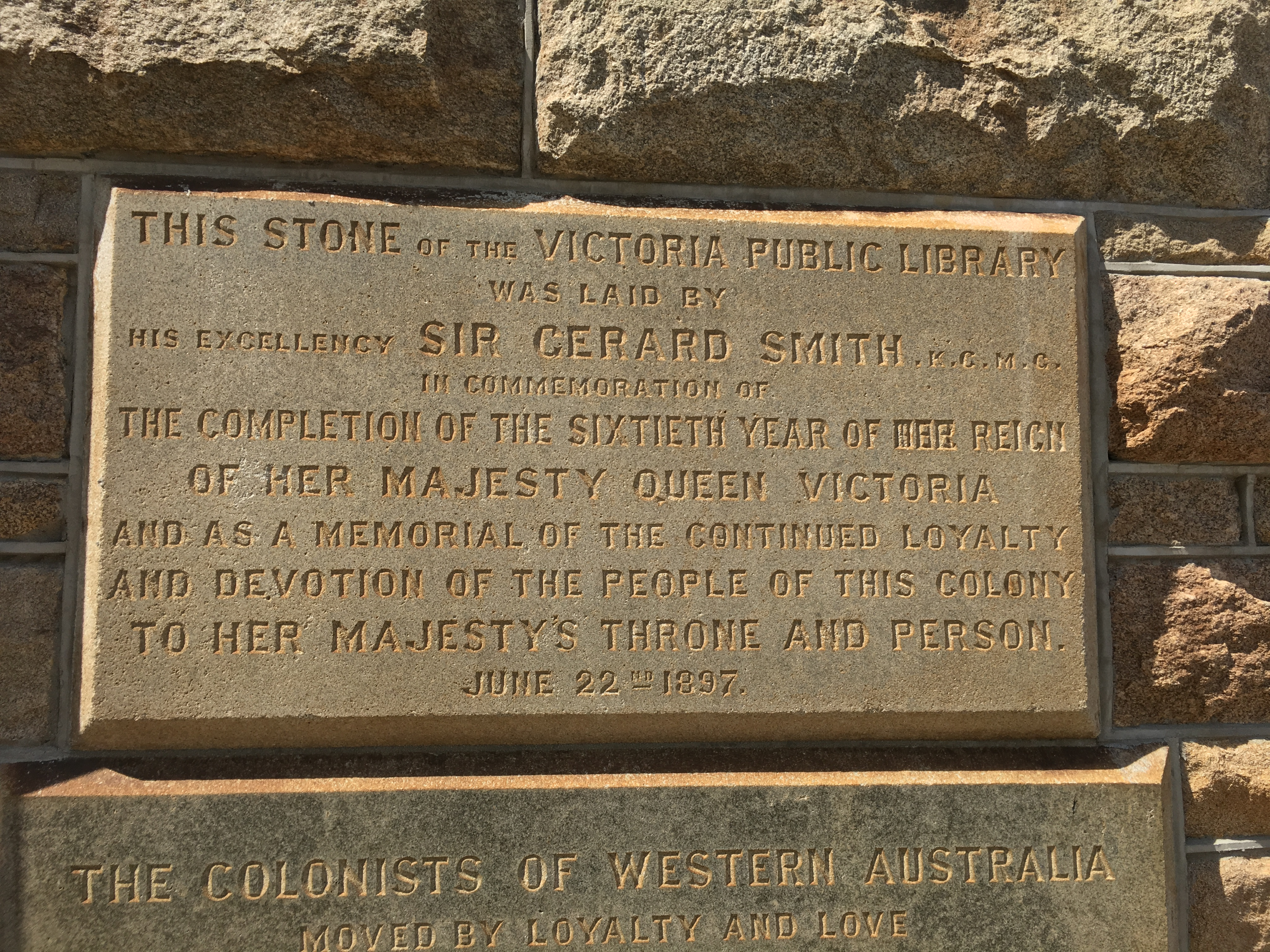
1897 Plaque for the Victoria Public Library

By 1896, construction had begun on a site at the corner of James and Beaufort Streets, and in 1897 the library moved to the new James Street site.

In 1904, the word Victoria was removed from the name of the library, which then became known as the Public Library of Western Australia. A new addition to the site was opened in 1913. It was called Hackett Hall after John Winthrop Hackett, the President of the Trustees of the Library, Museum and Art Gallery. The library shared this building with the Art Gallery and Museum, and the Western Australian Museum still occupies the building today. The Library Board of Western Australia was established with the passing of the Library Board of Western Australia Act 1951, appointing the first State Librarian, F. A. (Ali) Sharr. The purpose of the board was to assist local authorities in establishing free public libraries throughout the state, and work to co-ordinating those libraries as a statewide system. However, James Battye successfully resisted having the board take over control of the Public Library of Western Australia. It was only after Battye died in office in 1954 that the board gained control of the library. It was closed for a year for renovations, then reopened in 1956 as the State Library of Western Australia. This included a section dedicated to collecting Western Australian material – the J.S. Battye Library of West Australian History and State Archives.

Between 1964 and 2002 the organisation was known as the Library and Information Service of Western Australia. This reflected the board's broader operations beyond the walls of the library, particularly in encouraging the development of public library services throughout the state. In July 2002, the library once again became known as the State Library of Western Australia.

By the late 1970s, the library had grown sufficiently that staff were working from ten different sites and annexes in the city. Planning was undertaken for a new building as part of the development of the Perth Cultural Centre. In 1985 the library's current home, the Alexander Library Building, was opened. It is named after Fred Alexander, the first chairman of the Library Board of Western Australia.

The State Archives (later called the Public Records Office) was established as a separate unit in 1988, and the State Records Office of Western Australia was created as a separate entity to the library in 2000 with the passing of the State Records Act 2000. Responsibility for the collection and management of public records was transferred to the State Records Office of Western Australia, although it remains co-located with SLWA in the Alexander Library Building.

== Collections and services ==
SLWA operations fall into four main areas:

- collecting and preserving Western Australia's documentary heritage,
- general reference and public lending library services,
- literacy and education, and
- supporting the public library network in Western Australia.

=== Western Australian heritage ===
The J. S. Battye Library of Western Australian History is the arm of the library dedicated to Western Australian historical materials.

The library has extensive collection of Western Australian:

- Newspapers
- Original manuscripts, journals, diaries and letters
- Records of non-government organisations
- Music recordings
- Photographs
- Western Australian films
- Oral history recordings and transcripts
- Maps, charts and serials
- Private archives
- Post Office Directories

The Battye Library contains a comprehensive collection of books published in Western Australia, as well as books by a Western Australian or about Western Australia published elsewhere.

SLWA was the legal deposit library for Western Australia under the Copyright Act 1895 and the Newspaper Libel and Registration Act 1884, but these acts were repealed in 1994 and 2005 respectively. Legal deposit provisions were re-established in principle in 2012, with the passing of the Legal Deposit Act 2012, and brought into force for physical publications with the passage of the Legal Deposit Regulations 2013.

=== Reference and lending library ===
The library's reference collection provides resources which "reflect key Australian reference publications; and cover all subject areas to support self-directed learning to an undergraduate level". The collection holds over 300,000 books and nearly 5,000 serial titles, and many items are available for loan. SLWA also provides a number of electronic resources, some of which are available off-site for library members. There are also approximately 100 public computers available to users, as well as free Wi-Fi.

Other specialised collections and services include:

- Sheet music – SLWA holds over 70,000 music scores, making it the second largest public music lending library in Australia
- Genealogy resources – SLWA has a specialist family history section, and volunteers from the Western Australian Genealogical Society provide assistance to clients
- The Story Place – a dedicated children's area
- Read WA – a collection of loanable books by Western Australian authors.
- WA Premier's Book Awards – all the books shortlisted from the Western Australian Premier's Book Awards.
- Justice of the Peace
- eConnect – a space where you can get help with using your computer, ipad or phone. Learn how to download forms, apply for jobs, set up email, use government sites and apps and become better equipped to use the internet and technology.
- Community Languages Collection – language teaching materials, books and guides in over 40 different languages.

=== Relationship with public libraries ===
Public library services in Western Australia are delivered as a partnership between the state and local governments. The state government provides funding for the majority of the book stock and some other library materials, and local governments provide physical and technological infrastructure and staffing to operate public libraries. This partnership is administered by the Library Board of Western Australia through SLWA. SLWA provides centralised purchasing, and a statewide online catalogue, as well as facilitating the exchange of materials between public libraries.

=== National edeposit (NED) ===
As a member library of National and State Libraries Australia, the organisation collaborated on the creation of the National edeposit (NED) system, which enables publishers from all over Australia to upload electronic publications as per the 2016 amendment to the Copyright Act 1968 and other regional legislation relating to legal deposit, and makes these publications publicly accessible online (depending on access conditions) from anywhere via Trove.

=== Better Beginnings ===
Better Beginnings is a statewide program run by SLWA and started in 2004, aimed at increasing young children's access to books and encouraging daily parental interactions with their children.

== Gallery ==
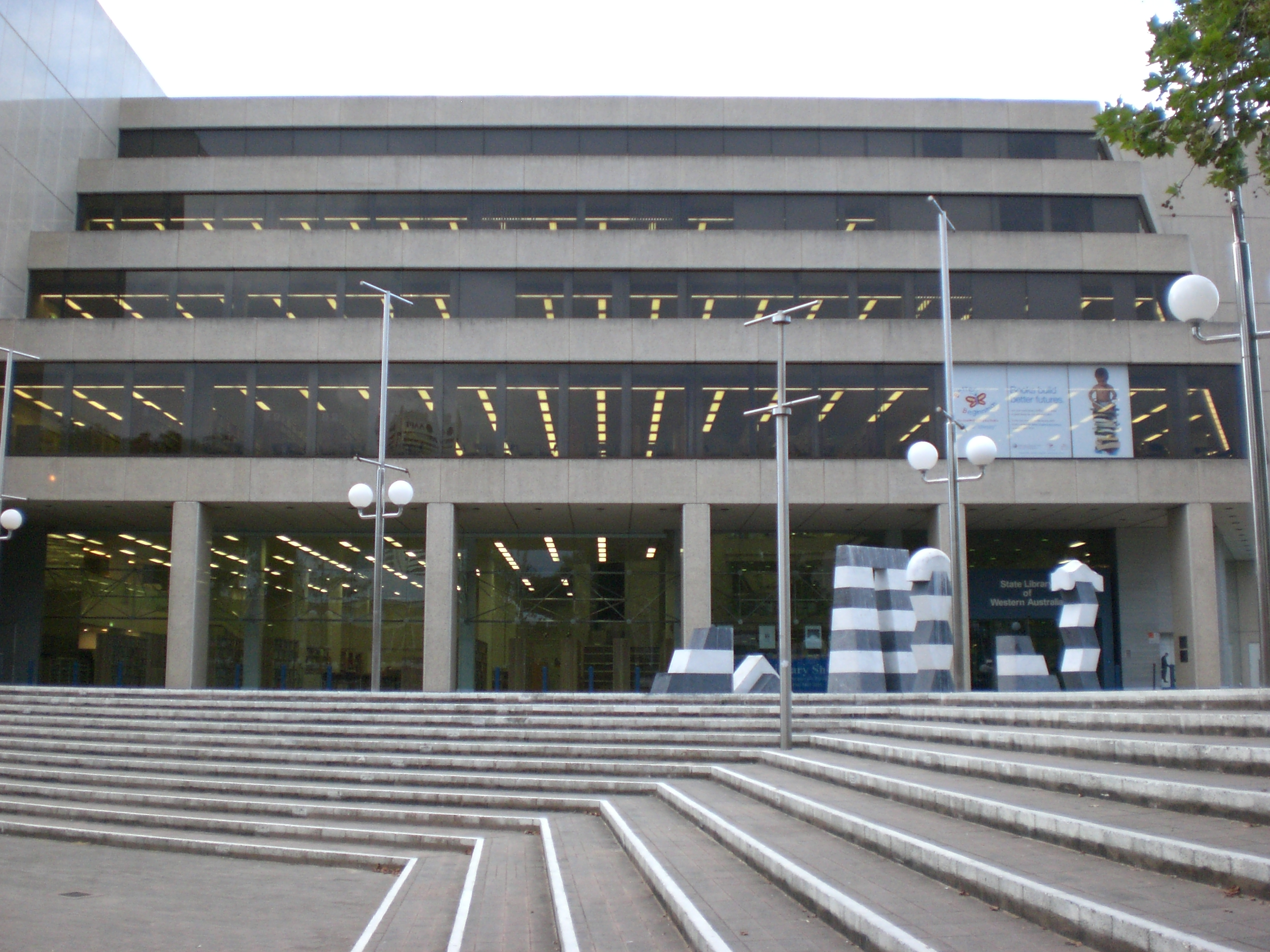
SLWA, Alexander Library Building

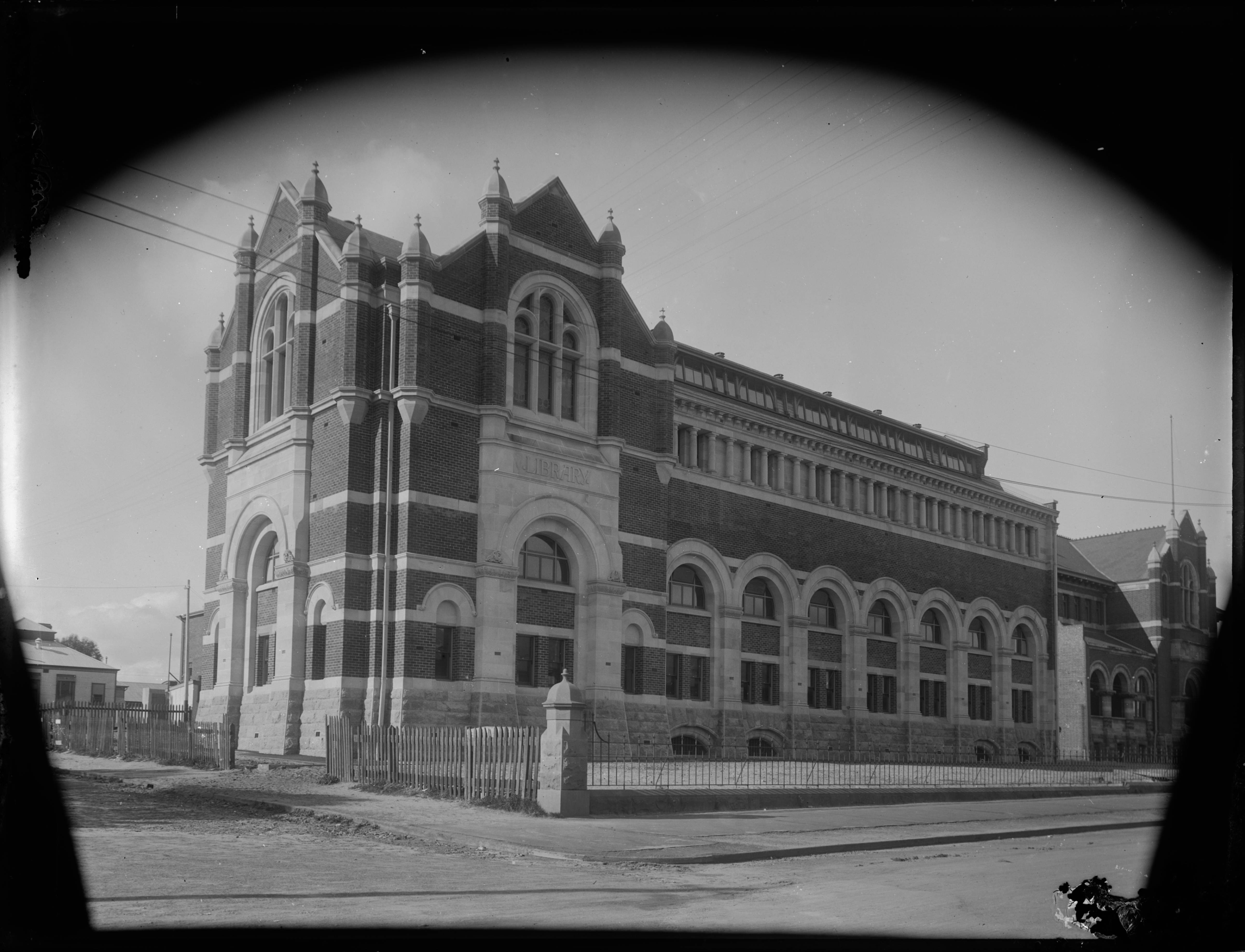
Hackett Hall, home of the Public Library of Western Australia, in 1913

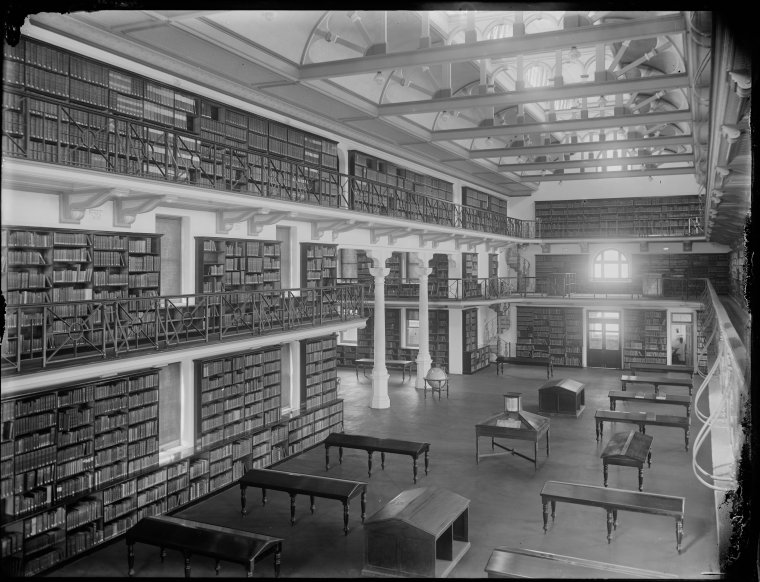
Inside the Public Library of Western Australia, 1913

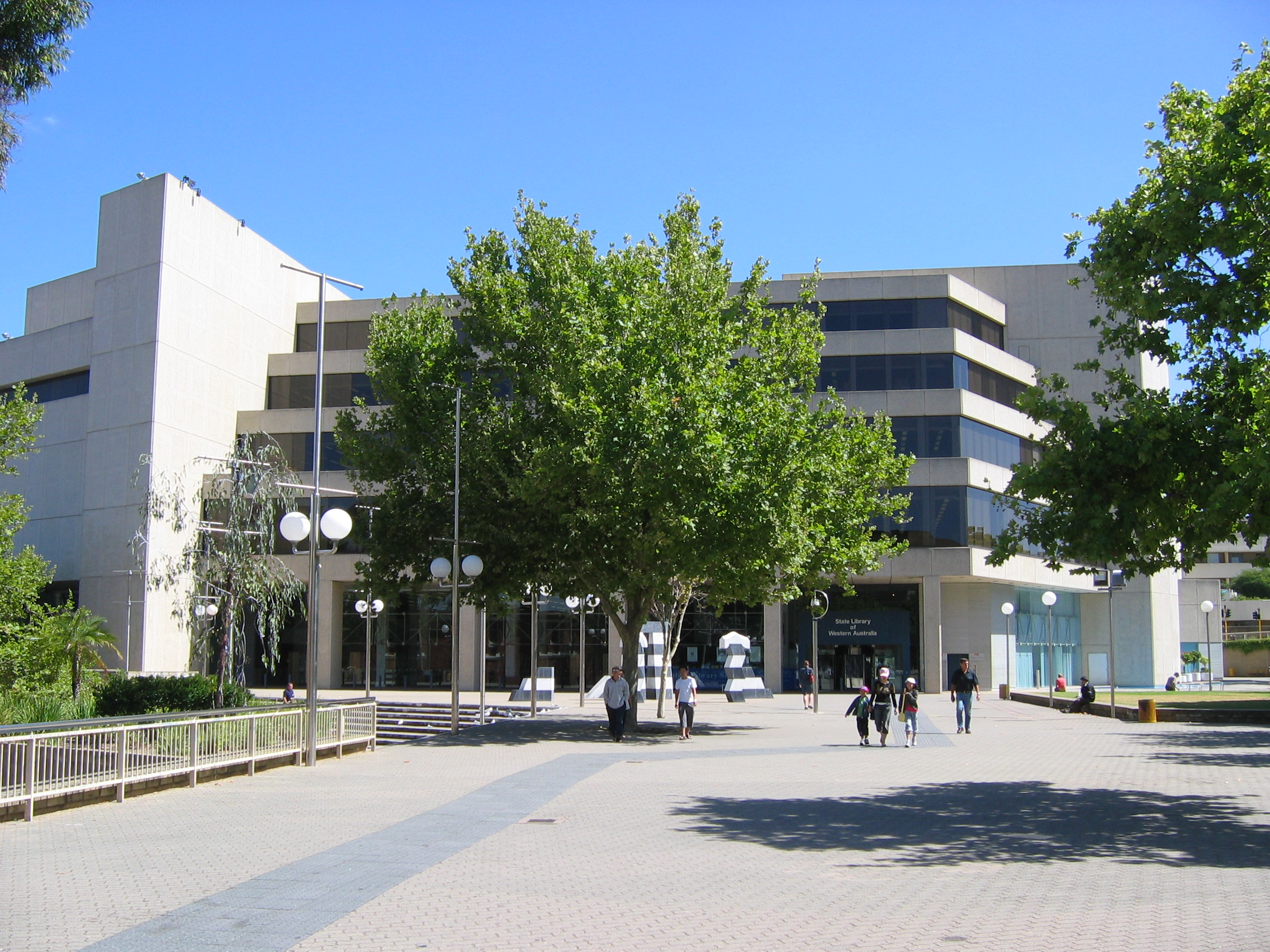

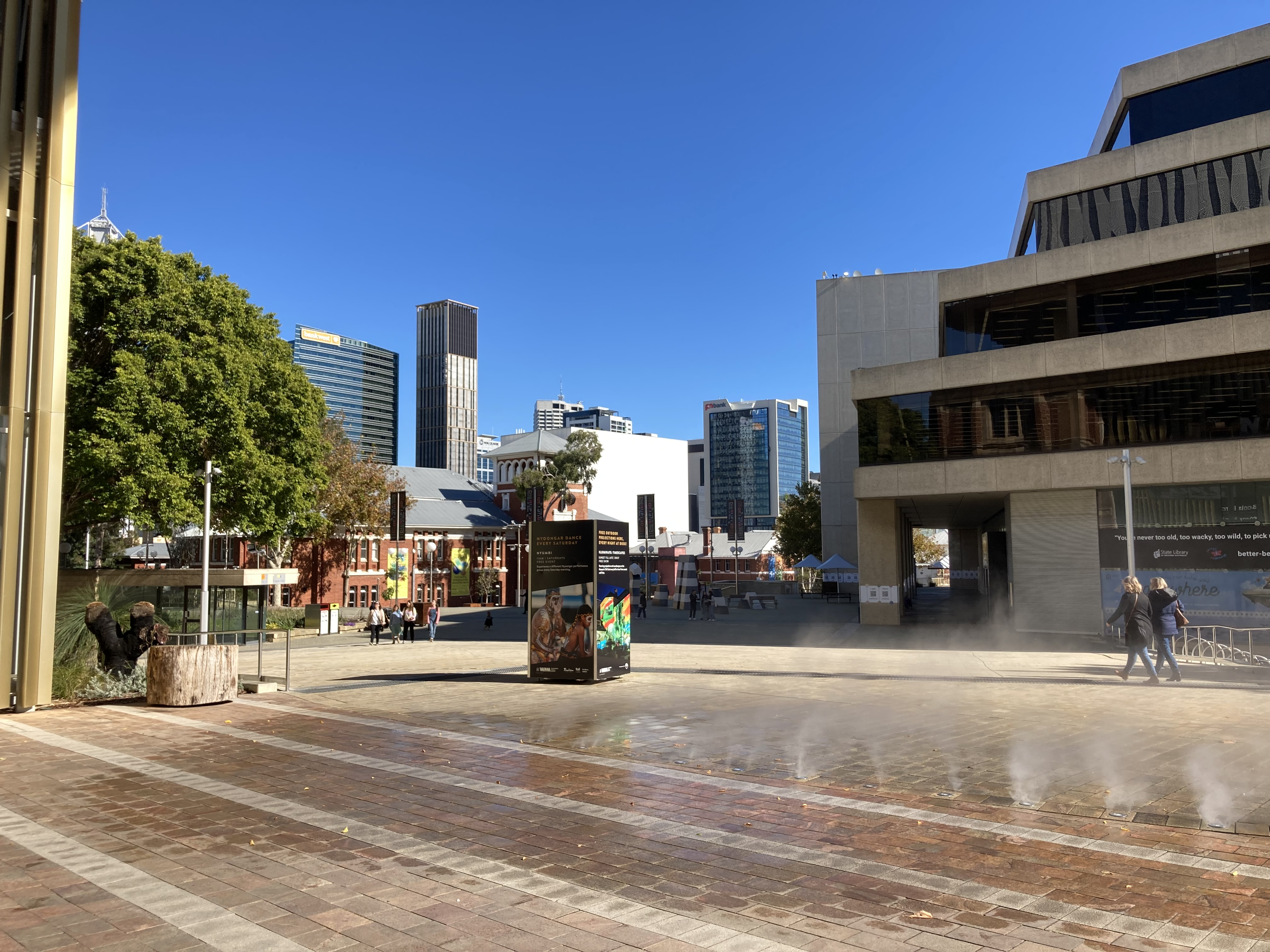

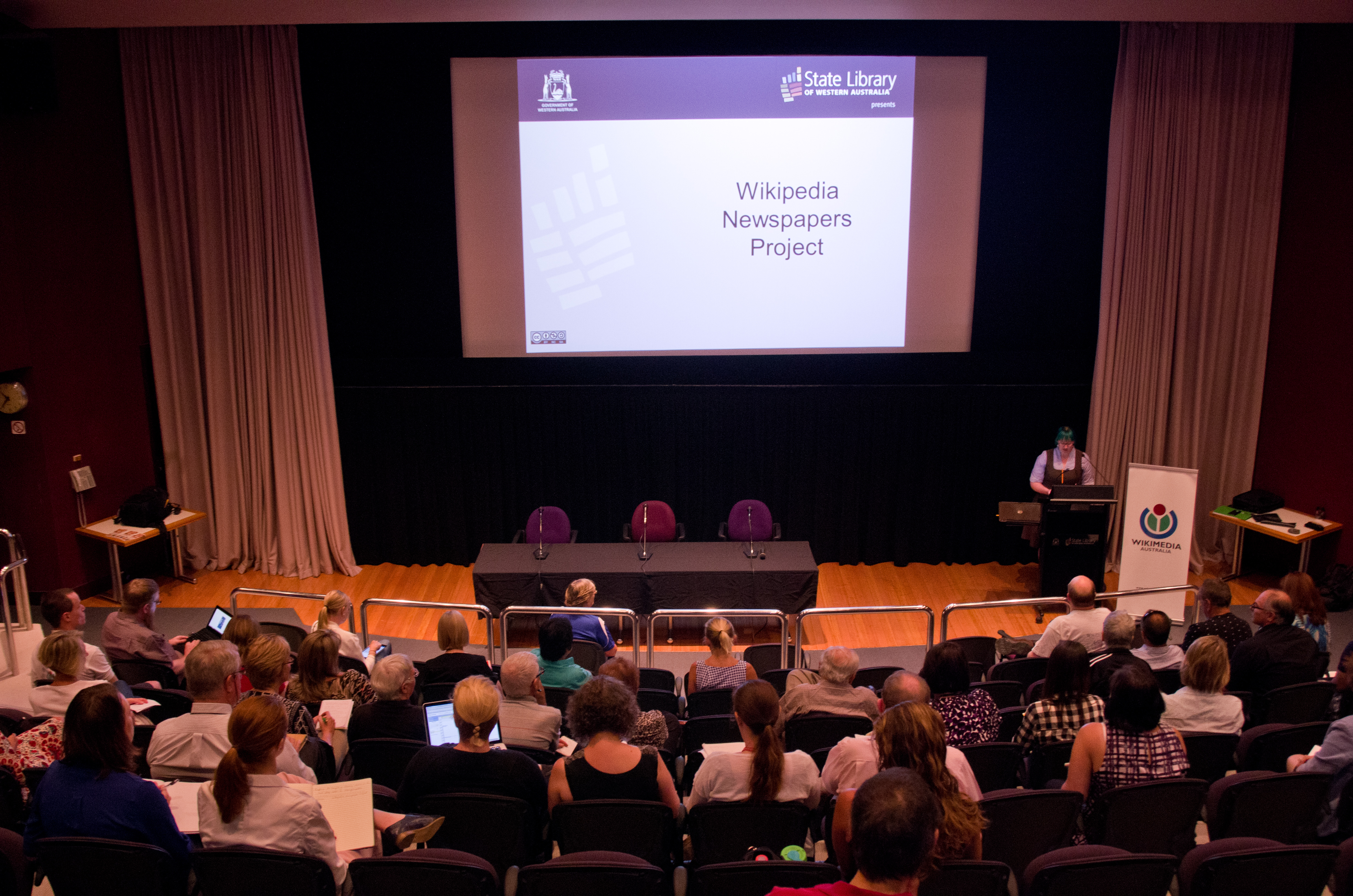

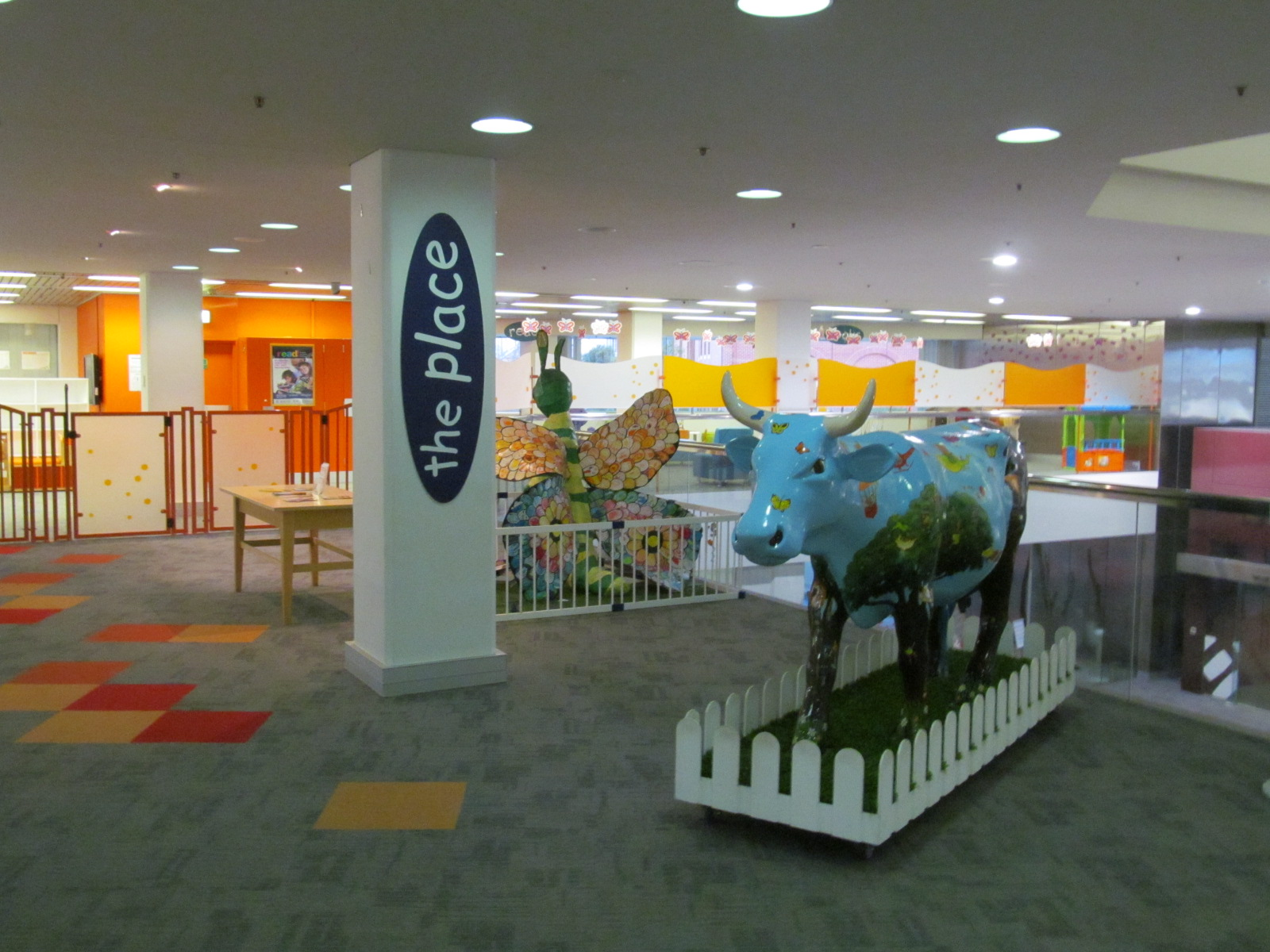

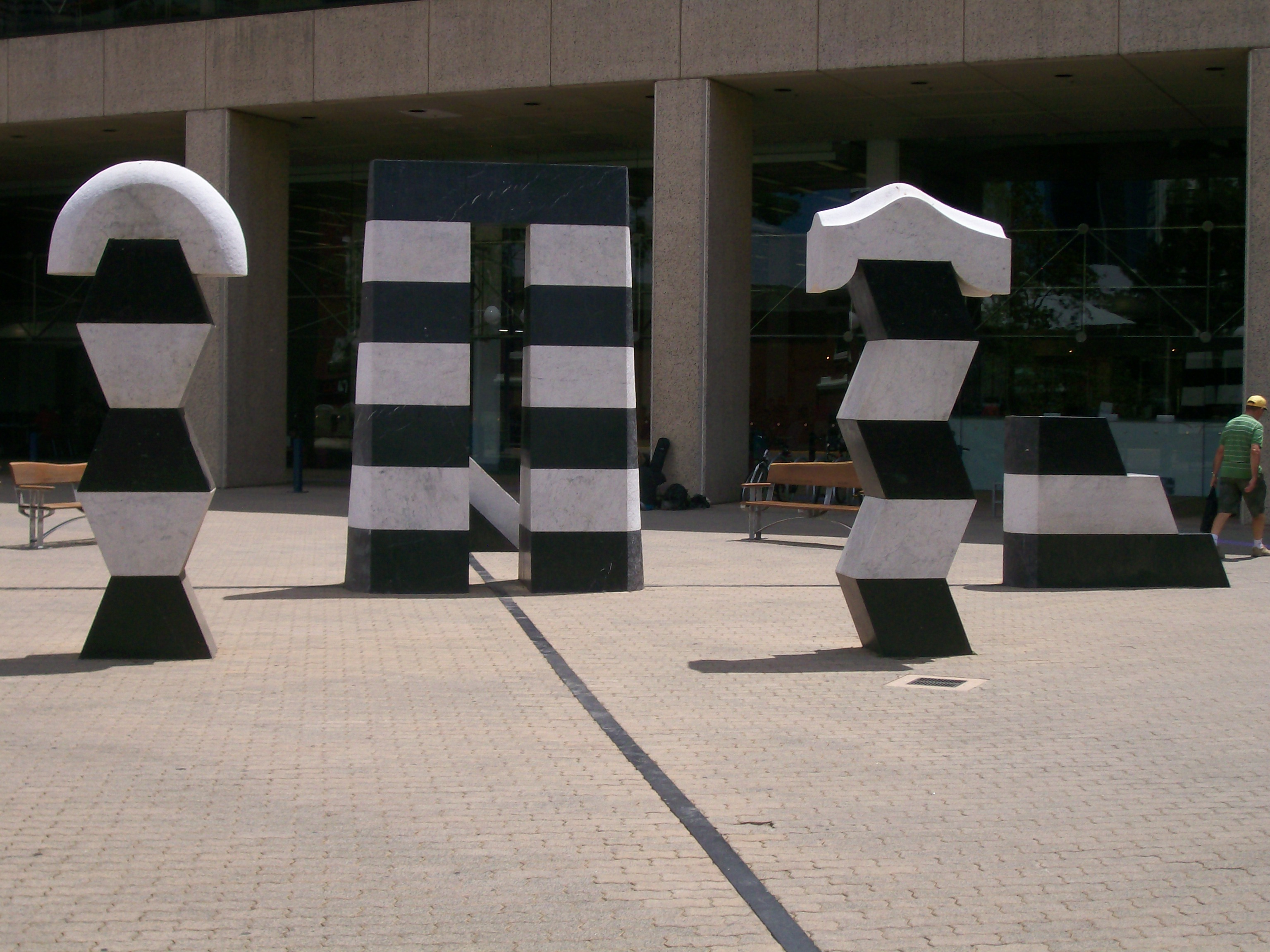
Gateway 2: Coalesce sculpture by Akio Makigawa, outside SLWA

== See also ==
- State Library of New South Wales
- State Library of South Australia
- State Library of Queensland
- State Library of Tasmania
- State Library of Victoria
