= Fred Alexander (historian) =

Australian historian

Bust of Frederick Alexander at the State Library of Western Australia, 2026

Frederick Alexander (known primarily as Fred Alexander) (12 April 1899 – 17 March 1996) was an Australian historian who specialised in foreign affairs and policy. He was the founding Head of the University of Western Australia's Department of History, where he was instrumental in the development of the history curriculum.

== Biography ==
The son of a primary school headmaster, Fred Alexander was born in Victoria on 12 April 1899. He attended Melbourne High School, and in 1916 won an exhibition to attend lectures at Trinity College during his studies at the University of Melbourne, where he intended to gain a Bachelor of Laws degree. However, he developed an interest in history under the influence of Professor Ernest Scott, and deferred his law studies to obtain a Bachelor of Arts with First Class Honours in history. He then completed his third year of law studies, but in 1920 he won an Orient Line scholarship that enabled him to pursue studies at Balliol College, Oxford.

During his second year at Balliol, he suffered from a recurrent illness, and in 1923 he was advised by his doctors to take a long sea voyage. That year, he sailed for Melbourne; when his ship docked at Fremantle, Western Australia, he took the opportunity to visit Edward Shann, the foundation professor of History and Economics at the University of Western Australia. The following year, after returning to England, receiving the Herbertson Prize in History along with a M.A., and getting married, he received from Shann an offer of appointment as Assistant Lecturer at the University of Western Australia. He arrived in Perth in September 1924. He was elected a Fellow of the Academy of the Social Sciences in Australia in 1944.

In 1949–50, he spent four months in South Africa as a Carnegie Fellow, an experience which caused him to concentrate on Commonwealth history. He retired in 1966, and later served as Chairman of the Library Board of Western Australia. The Alexander Library Building is named after him. He died on 17 March 1996.

== Bibliography ==
Fred Alexander was the author of a great many works. The following are a few of his better known publications:

- Alexander, Fred (1928). From Paris to Locarno, and after: the League of Nations and the search for security, 1919-1928. London: Dent.
- Alexander, Fred; Francis Crowley & John Legge (1954). The origins of the Eastern Goldfields water scheme in Western Australia: an exercise in the interpretation of historical evidence. Nedlands: University of Western Australia Press.
- Alexander, Fred, ed. (1957). Four bishops and their See: Perth, Western Australia, 1857-1957. Nedlands: University of Western Australia Press.
- Alexander, Fred (1960). Canadians and foreign policy. Melbourne: Cheshire.
- Alexander, Fred (1963). Campus at Crawley. Melbourne: Cheshire for University of Western Australia Press.
- Alexander, Fred (1967). Australia since federation. Melbourne: Nelson.
- Alexander, Fred (1973). From Curtin to Menzies and after: continuity or confrontation?. Melbourne: Thomas Nelson Australia.
- Alexander, Fred (1987). On Campus and Off: Reminiscences and Reflections of the First Professor of Modern History in The University of Western Australia, 1916–1986. University of Western Australia Press. 0855642645.
