= Western Australia Post Office Directory =

Western Australian directory

- Subject: Western Australia
- Publisher: H. Pierssené, H. Wise & Co.

The Western Australia Post Office Directory, also known as Wise Directories and Wise Street Directories, was published in Perth by H. Pierssené in 1893–1895, and by H. Wise & Co in 1895–1949 except for 1943 and 1948. It listed household, business, society, and Government contacts in Perth, Fremantle, Kalgoorlie, Boulder and Coolgardie including some rural areas of Western Australia.

== Publishers ==
Herbert Pierssené was a merchant and importer of English continental and Ceylonese goods. He was also an agent for McCulluch Carrying Company and a bottler of Western Australian wines.

== Wise Directories ==
The directories provide information by locality, individual surname, government service, and by trade or profession. The addresses of householders and businesses throughout Western Australia are included. Maps were sometimes published with an edition of the directory. The towns section of the directories normally contained separate street directories of Perth and suburbs, Fremantle and suburbs, Kalgoorlie, Boulder and Coolgardie.

Known colloquially to users and book collectors as Wise Directories and Wise Street Directories, the red covered directories were published between 1893 and 1949. Due to the annual changes, the directories are valuable historical documents for Western Australian history. They are scarce in the Australian rare book market.

The directories have been invaluable referent points for such projects as the Dictionary of Western Australians and others where the street lists in the directory provide details of inhabitants and houses in some streets in the more built-up residential areas. Country towns in the directory have name lists only.

They have been available in microfilm form in J S Battye Library, and more recently have become online in one of the J S Battye Library digitization projects.

== Publication details ==
- Post Office Directories. Perth: H. Pierssené; H. Wise. 1893–1949. LCCN 53028835. OCLC 220918484. Wikidata Q7987491 – via State Library of Western Australia.

== See also ==
- Australia Post
- Australian Dictionary of Biography
- Cyclopedia of Western Australia
- Dictionary of Australian Biography
- State Records Office of Western Australia
