= James Battye =

Librarian and historian of Western Australia

James Sykes Battye
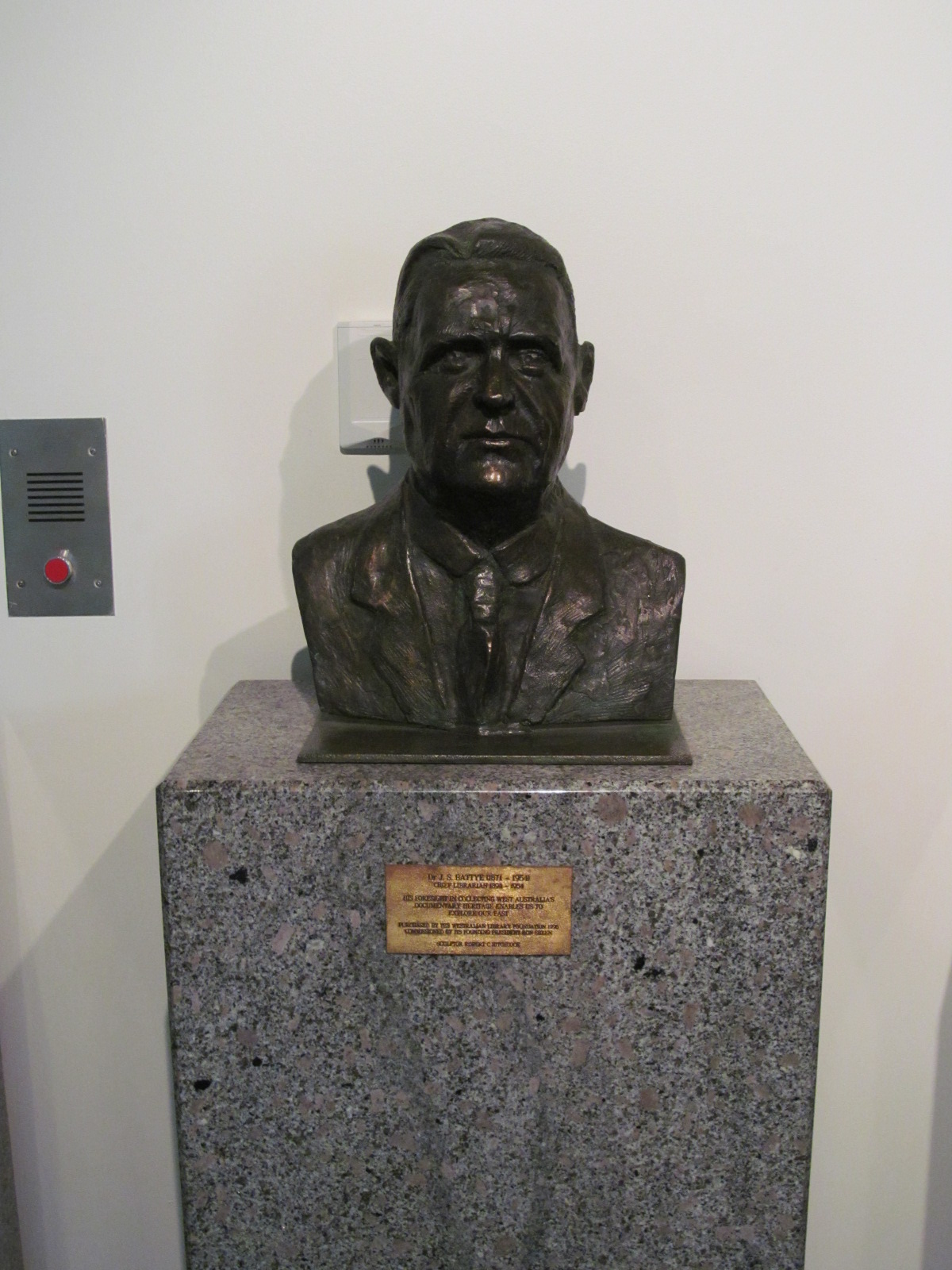
- A bust of Battye located in the State Library of Western Australia
- Born: 1871
- Died: 15 July 1954 (aged 82–83)
- Occupations: Librarian; Historian; Academic
- Years active: 1894 – 1954
- Known for: Inaugural chief librarian in Western Australia

James Sykes Battye (1871–1954) was an Australian librarian who was the first chief librarian of the Victoria Public Library in Perth, Western Australia. He was a leading historian, librarian and public figure in Western Australia and also served as a Chancellor of the University of Western Australia.

In 1951, The West Australian newspaper designated him as the Principal librarian and secretary of the Public Library, Museum and Art Gallery of Western Australia.

Battye Street in the Canberra suburb of Bruce is named in his honour.

== Biography ==
James Sykes Battye was born at Geelong, Victoria, on 20 November 1871. His father Daniel Battye, was a wool-weaver from Yorkshire in England. His mother was Maria, (née Quamby).

He married Sarah Elizabeth May in Melbourne on 15 May 1895.

Battye came to Western Australia from Victoria in 1894 after being appointed of Principal Librarian of the Public Library. Later appointed the Secretary of the Public Library, Meseum and Art Gallery in 1912, which he both held until his death in 1954.

Although not directly within his professional role, he developed a strong interest in Western Australian history and began collecting material from early in the century.

He formed part of the Royal Commission on the establishment of a University in Western Australia, becoming the University of Western Australia. He was a foundation member of the University Senate in 1912 which he held until 1954.

In 1922, the University of Western Australia conferred upon him the doctorate of literauture for his work in publishing the History of Western Australia.

Battye was elected as the Prochancellor of University of Western Australia from 1931 until 1936 when elected as the Chancellor, serving until 1943.

He was awarded the C.B.E in 1950.

Battye died at his home on 15 July 1954, aged 82.

The J S Battye Library is named in his honour. "Battye" is a local term for the library and also his History of Western Australia volume published at the time of the Western Australia centenary celebrations in 1929.

== Published works ==
Battye was involved in a number of publishing projects – the Cyclopedia of Western Australia before the First World War, and the History of Western Australia, as well as the commemoration of the state's centenary in 1929 he was involved in the organising committee.

- Battye, J. S. (1985) [1912]. The Cyclopedia of Western Australia: an historical and commercial review: descriptive and biographical facts, figures and illustrations: an epitome of progress. Vol. 2 volumes (Illustrated ed.). Adelaide: Cyclopedia Company by Hussey & Gillingham. p. 1025. Facsimile edition published in 1985 by Hesperian Press, Carlisle, W.A. ISBN 0-85905-072-6.
- Battye, J. S. (1978) [1924]. Western Australia: a history from its discovery to the inauguration of the Commonwealth (Facsimile edition: (1978) with an introduction by B. K. de Garis. Nedlands, W.A. University of Western Australia Press). Oxford: Clarendon Press. ISBN 0-85564-136-3.

== See also ==
- Western Australia Post Office Directory
- State Records Office of Western Australia

Academic offices
Preceded by Sir Walter James	Chancellor of the University of Western Australia; 1936 – 1943	Succeeded by Sir Walter Murdoch
