= F. A. Sharr =

Australian librarian (1914–2002)

Francis Aubie Sharr (1914–2002) was a state librarian of Western Australia, the first to be appointed after the formation of a board in 1956 to oversee the state's library system.

F. A. Sharr, known as Ali, was born in England in 1914, the only child of Ethel Lucy née Bennett and her husband Francis Joseph Sharr. He worked in British public libraries after graduating in London at University College and completing post graduate study at the University of London School of Librarianship. During the Second World War he was enlisted in the Royal Artillery. While serving as the city of Manchester's Deputy City Librarian, after completion of his military service, he was appointed to become the first State Librarian of Western Australia in 1956. Sharr held dual roles as state librarian and secretary of the library board, established as the coordinating body for local and regional collections and the State Library of Western Australia; he held these positions from the time of his first arrival until retiring in 1976.

Ali Sharr worked at other institutions and coordinating bodies, acting as a consultant to the Northern Nigerian government during 1962–1963, attended international conferences on establishing other nation's library services, and on committees formed in Australia.

Sharr was the recipient of several awards, including the 1977 New Year Honours list, and an honorary Doctorate of Letters from Curtin University in 1991. An award, originally a medal, is named for Sharr, the recipients receiving recognition for excellence in works undertaken in the first few years after graduation. He died shortly after the death of his wife, librarian Florence McKeand, on 16 November 2002.

The works of F. A. Sharr include his recollections of public service and a book Western Australian plant names and their meanings: a glossary, published in 1978 and revised in 1996.
