= Hesperian Press =

Australian publisher

Coordinates: 31.986792°S 115.91667°E

Hesperian Press is a locally owned and operated book publisher in Perth, Western Australia.

== History ==
Peter Bridge first published technical material in 1969. The Hesperian Press business in its current format started in 1979. It republishes out-of-print books together with new texts. Hesperian Press has also published facsimiles of early out-of-print Western Australian books, and the writings of European explorers of Australia. It also produces otherwise difficult to trace items.

In August 2025, The Guardian reported that Hesperian Press would be publishing an edition of the diaries of early Western Australian settler Major Logue. These diaries contained sections written in a simple code which, when decoded, revealed Logue had murdered at least 19 Yamatji people. The company made the decision not to publish the sections relating to the murders which was criticised by Chris Owen, historian of mass murders of Aboriginal people. In response, Bridge stated that he intended to publish the document as originally written, and that the sections written in code were unpublishable due to the technical difficulty of producing the characters.

The Guardian stated that Hesperian's catalogue contained "descriptions of historical works using outdated and racist language", and that Bridge's own works suggested "Aboriginal 'criminal matters' have been minimised by 'our masters'".

== Sources ==
- Allam, Lorena; Collard, Sarah; Archibald-Binge, Ella; Evershed, Nick; Ball, Andy (3 August 2025). "The Killing Code: Strange Symbols in a Wa Settler's Diaries Lay Bare Frontier Atrocities". The Guardian.
- "Home". Explorations WA. n.d. Archived from the original on 6 July 2011.
- "Home". Hesperian Press. 2006. Archived from the original on 5 December 2006.
- Hobby, Nathan (29 March 2007). "Wa Publisher Profile: Hesperian Press". State Library of Western Australia. Archived from the original on 19 October 2016.
- Rothwell, Nicholas (23 July 2016). "Hard Country". The Australian. Archived from the original on 27 October 2023.
- "Peter Bridge – Biography of Publisher, Hesperian Press". The Sunday Times. Perth. 1 September 1985. p. 53.
- "Peter Bridge – Biography of Publisher and Information About Hesperian Press". The West Australian. 27 December 1984. p. 103.
