= State Records Office of Western Australia =

State archives of Western Australia

Coordinates: 31.9490°S 115.8605°E

The State Records Office of Western Australia (SRO) is a Government of Western Australia authority with responsibility for identifying, managing, preserving and providing access to the state's archives. It also delivers best-practice records management services to state and local government agencies.

The SRO operates under its own legislation, the State Records Act 2000. It is an independent government agency within Western Australia's Department of Local Government, Sport & Cultural Industries.

== History ==
The nucleus of the state archives collections is the Colonial Secretary's Office records acquired in 1903 by the first librarian of the Public Library, James Battye. Concern about the destruction of valuable records prompted the formation of the Public Records Committee (chaired by Battye) in 1923, which was later revived as the State Archives Board in 1929, which functioned until 1943. In March 1945, Mollie Lukis was appointed as the first archivist overseeing the development of the state's archival collections and, in 1956, the state archives collection became part of the J S Battye Library.

=== Separation ===
In 1988 the State Archives became a separate directorate within the Library and Information Service of Western Australia (LISWA) and in 1990 a Records Management Branch, (now called Recordkeeping Services), was established to enable more active engagement in records management matters at both state and local government levels. In 1995 the State Archives was renamed the Public Records Office and the responsibility for private archives was transferred to the Battye Library in 1996. In April 1999 the SRO moved to the ground floor of the Alexander Library Building and given its current name.

In November 2000 the State Records Act 2000 was passed, the State Records Commission was established and the State Records Office became independent of the LISWA.

Since 2020, public access to the SRO collections has been colocated with the State Library of Western Australia, on the third Floor of the Alexander Library Building. Archives can be accessed in the Leah Jane Cohan Reading Room.

== Legislation ==
The State Records Act 2000 replaced the archives and recordkeeping aspects of the Library Board of Western Australia Act 1951. Providing for an independent State Records Commission (SRC) with standards-setting, auditing and reporting responsibilities, the SRC is accountable directly to Parliament. Membership of the commission is at a level commensurate with the high degree of accountability and transparency that are hallmarks of the legislation. The four members of the commission are the Auditor General, the Information Commissioner, the Ombudsman, and an appointee with recordkeeping experience from outside Government.

The SRO has legislative responsibility for ensuring government records are appropriately created and maintained.

The SRO also manages the State archives collection, defined as those government records recognised as having continuing and enduring value for the State and the community and which have been transferred to the SRO's custody.

The legislation has its genesis in the recommendations of the 1996 Commission on Government – Specified Matter 9. The Commission on Government was itself the result of the WA Inc Royal Commission into the commercial activities of government and other matters.

== State archives collection ==
The State Records Office maintains approximately 15 linear kilometres (9.3 mi) of archival records, comprising approximately 2 million items and created by over 1,300 individual State and Local Government agencies, many of which are now defunct or have had significant changes in name or function. The state archives collection is the largest collection of documentary heritage in Western Australia and archives date from the foundation of the Swan River Colony in 1829.

The state archives collection includes:

- Records about Aboriginal Western Australians
- The architectural and engineering plans of the Public Works Department
- Records of land surveys, grants and purchases from the 19th and early 20th centuries
- Colonial/Chief Secretary's Office records from 1828 until early 20th century
- Records of convicts transported to Western Australia, 1850–1868. These have been inscribed on UNESCO's Memory of the World Register.
- Court records; including those of the Supreme Court dating from 1832 until the mid-20th century.
- Records of the Department of Education and various state schools
- Harbour and shipping records and 19th-century passenger lists
- Health Department and hospital records
- The records of local government in WA
- Department of Mines records
- Police Department and police station records
- Premier, cabinet and parliamentary records
- Prison records
- Records about the development of railways

As of 2014, it was estimated that approximately 53 shelf kilometres (33 mi) of archives were awaiting transfer to the SRO but could not be accepted owing to "a lack of specialised storage space."

== Annual award ==
Since 2003 the Margaret Medcalf award has been given to published and unpublished research utilising and referencing State archives held by the SRO records.

Recent winners have been:

- 2022: Joint winners: Emily Lanman for Prisoners, Power and Panopticon: Investigating Fremantle Gaol, 1831–1841; and Leigh Straw for The Petticoat Parade: Madam Monnier and the Roe Street Brothels from Fremantle Press.
- 2021: The Carceral Colony an edition of Studies in Western Australian History.
- 2020: Dr Tiffany Shellam for The Collective Nyungar Heritage of an "Orphan Letter".
- 2019: Dr Robin Barrington for her journal article A Race War: Tracing emotions on the Murchison frontier in Western Australia 1880–1915.
- 2018: Joint Winners: Joanna Sassoon – Agents of Empire: How E.L. Mitchell's Photographs shaped Australia, & Leigh Straw – After the War: Returned Soldiers and the Mental and Physical Scars of WW1
- 2017: Criena Fitzgerald – Turning men into Stone: A Social and Medical History of Silicosis in Western Australia from 1890 to 1970

A list of all previous winners is available on SRO's website.

== Accessing the state's archives ==
State archives held by the State Records Office of Western Australia can be accessed via the Reading Room on the third floor of the Alexander Library Building, in the Perth Cultural Centre.

Online access and provision of digital copies are also available to the general public. Information about the records in the collection can be found using the SRO's online catalogue.

== General references ==
- "Towards a State Archive in Western Australia, 1903–1945", by Michael Nind, published in Early Days (Vol. 11, Pt. 3) in 1997.
- "The Pre-history of the State Archives" : address by Sir Paul Hasluck
- "The State Archives of Western Australia" by Tom Reynolds and Christopher Coggin, published in Western Perspectives: Library and Information Services in Western Australia (edited by Robert C. Sharman and Laurel A. Clyde) in 1990.
