= J S Battye Library =

Division of the State Library of Western Australia

Coordinates: 31°56′56″S 115°51′38″E

The J S Battye Library (more properly known as the J. S. Battye Library of West Australian History) is an arm of the State Library of Western Australia. It stores much of the state's historical records and original publications including books, newspapers, periodicals, maps, and ephemera, as well as oral history tapes, photographs and artworks, films and video, and non-government records which are kept in the library's Private Archives collection. The Library provides a range of services, including reference, copying, and genealogical services, as well as consultancy and reader education.

== Founder ==
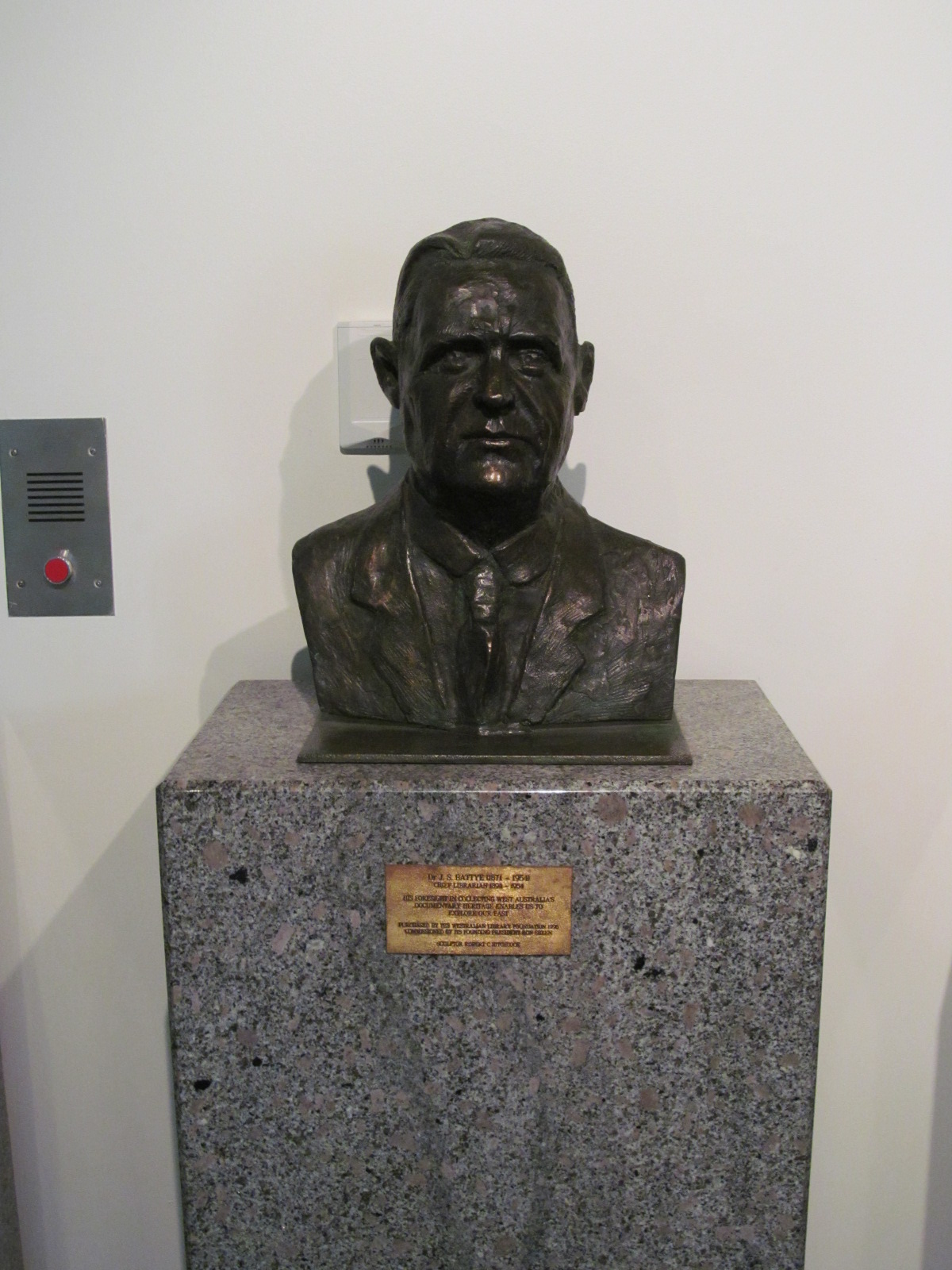
James Battye bust found in Alexander Library Building, Perth, Western Australia

The library is named after James Battye, the first State Librarian, who began the collection in the early 1900s. It was established in December 1956.

== Librarians ==
Mollie Lukis and Margaret Medcalf were successors to Battye as Battye librarians, and their long service to the Library was an important part of the library's development.

== Location ==
The Battye Library is housed on the Level 3 of the State Library of Western Australia (formerly known as the Alexander Library Building). The public access can access rare and precious material from the Leah Jane Chen Reading Room. There is a help desk, microfiche readers, reference materials and computers.

The separate State Records Office of Western Australia houses the State and local government archives.

The current administrative structure of the State Library has removed mention of the name of the library from the library catalogue and now refers to it as 3rd Floor of the Alexander building, however it still has a web page.

== Friends ==
The Friends of Battye Library has been a significant support to the library during an era where staffing and funding have been reduced by government restrictions on funding. The organisation has been instrumental in attracting external funding for a range of projects including publishing.

== Publications ==
At different stages in the library history, publications have been an important indicator of the library collection and its holdings.

== See also ==
- Izzy Orloff, Fremantle photographer who has a significant collection held by the library

== Publications ==
- J. S. Battye Library of West Australian History; Library Board of Western Australia (1983), Tracing your ancestors : a guide to genealogical sources in the J.S. Battye Library of West Australian history, Library Board of W.A, ISBN 978-0-7244-6929-1
- J. S. Battye Library of West Australian History; Oakley, Glenda; Library and Information Service of Western Australia; State Archives of Western Australia (1991), Our military ancestors : a guide to sources in the J.S. Battye Library of West Australian History and the State Archives of Western Australia, Library and Information Service of Western Australia, ISBN 978-0-7244-6944-4
