= December 11 =

December 11 this year in various calendars
- Friday, 11 December 2026
Akan	Kwafie
Armenian	24 Kʿaloch 1476
Aztec	Tozoztontli 10, 11 Calli
Babylonian	1 Kislimu, 2337 SE
Balinese pawukon	Luang, Pepet, Beteng, Sri, Paing, Was, Sukra of Gumbreg, Sri, Jangur, Manuh
Bengali	26 Ogrohayon, BS 1433
Chinese	Yin Earth Goat・Neck Mansion; Fire Horse Year, Month 11, Day 3 (Daxue, 11 days until Dongzhi)
Common Era	11 December 2026 CE
Coptic	2 Koiak, AM 1743
Egyptian	29 Pharmuthi, 2775 NE
Ethiopian	2 Tākḫśāś, 2019 Amätä Məhrät
French Republican	Décade II, Décadi de Frimaire de l'Année 235 de la République
Gregorian	11 December, AD 2026
Hebrew	1 Tevet, AM 5787
Hindu	Pūrvāṣāḍha・Gaṇḍa; Solar: 25 Mārgaśīrṣa, 1948 SE; Lunisolar: Dvitīyā, Śukla pakṣa of Mārgaśīrṣa, 2083 VE; Rāudra・5127 KY・1,872,920
Icelandic	Föstudagur, 19 Ýlir 2026
Islamic	1 Rajab, AH 1448 (using tabular method)
ISO week date	2026-W50-5
Japanese	3 Shimotsuki, Reiwa 8 (Taisetsu, 11 days until Tōji)
Julian	28 November, AD 2026 (AM 7535)
Julian day	2461386
Korean	3 Jwidal, 4359 DE
Maya	13.0.14.3.3; 16 Mac, 11 Akbal
Roman	ante diem IV Kalendas Decembres, MMDCCLXXIX AUC
Solar Hijri	20 Azar, SH 1405
Tibetan	3 mgo, me pho rta 2153 or 1772 or 1000

<<	December					>>
Su	Mo	Tu	We	Th	Fr	Sa
		1	2	3	4	5
6	7	8	9	10	11	12
13	14	15	16	17	18	19
20	21	22	23	24	25	26
27	28	29	30	31
2026

December 11 in recent years
2025 (Thursday)
2024 (Wednesday)
2023 (Monday)
2022 (Sunday)
2021 (Saturday)
2020 (Friday)
2019 (Wednesday)
2018 (Tuesday)
2017 (Monday)
2016 (Sunday)

December 11 is the 345th day of the year (346th in leap years) in the Gregorian calendar; 20 days remain until the end of the year.

== Events ==
=== Pre-1600 ===
- 220 – Emperor Xian of Han is forced to abdicate the throne by Cao Cao's son Cao Pi, ending the Han dynasty.
- 361 – Julian enters Constantinople as sole Roman Emperor.
- 861 – Assassination of the Abbasid caliph al-Mutawakkil by the Turkish guard, who raise al-Muntasir to the throne, start of the "Anarchy at Samarra".
- 969 – Byzantine Emperor Nikephoros II Phokas is assassinated by his wife Theophano and her lover, the later Emperor John I Tzimiskes.
- 1041 – Michael V, adoptive son of Empress Zoë of Byzantium, is proclaimed emperor of the Eastern Roman Empire.
- 1239 – Treaty of Benavente: the heiresses of the Kingdom of León renounce their throne to King Ferdinand III of Castile
- 1282 – Battle of Orewin Bridge: Llywelyn ap Gruffudd, the last native Prince of Wales, is killed at Cilmeri near Builth Wells in mid-Wales.
- 1317 – The Nyköping Banquet (Swedish: Nyköpings gästabud) takes place as King Birger of Sweden celebrates Christmas at Nyköping Castle. Among the guests are his two brothers Duke Valdemar and Duke Eric, who later that night are imprisoned and eventually starved to death in the castle dungeon.

=== 1601–1900 ===
- 1602 – A surprise attack by forces under the command of Charles Emmanuel I, Duke of Savoy, and his brother-in-law, Philip III of Spain, is repelled by the citizens of Geneva. (Commemorated annually by the Fête de l'Escalade.)
- 1640 – The Root and Branch petition, signed by 15,000 Londoners calling for the abolition of the episcopacy, is presented to the Long Parliament.
- 1675 – Antonio de Vea expedition enters San Rafael Lake in western Patagonia.
- 1688 – Glorious Revolution: James II of England, while trying to flee to France, throws the Great Seal of the Realm into the River Thames.
- 1792 – French Revolution: King Louis XVI of France is put on trial for treason by the National Convention.
- 1815 – The U.S. Senate creates a select committee on finance and a uniform national currency, predecessor of the United States Senate Committee on Finance.
- 1816 – Indiana becomes the 19th U.S. state.
- 1862 – American Civil War: The Battle of Fredericksburg begins as the Army of the Potomac under Union General Ambrose Burnside crosses the Rappahannock River to clash with the Army of Northern Virginia led by Confederate General Robert E. Lee in Fredericksburg, Virginia.
- 1868 – Paraguayan War: Brazilian troops defeat the Paraguayan Army at the Battle of Avay.
- 1899 – Second Boer War: In the Battle of Magersfontein the Boers commanded by general Piet Cronjé inflict a defeat on the forces of the British Empire commanded by Lord Methuen trying to relieve the Siege of Kimberley.

=== 1901–present ===
- 1901 – Guglielmo Marconi transmits the first transatlantic radio signal from Poldhu, Cornwall, England to St. John's, Newfoundland.
- 1905 – A workers' uprising occurs in Kyiv, Ukraine (then part of the Russian Empire), and establishes the Shuliavka Republic.
- 1907 – The New Zealand Parliament Buildings are almost completely destroyed by fire.
- 1913 – More than two years after it was stolen from the Louvre, Leonardo da Vinci's painting Mona Lisa is recovered in Florence, Italy. The thief, Vincenzo Peruggia, is immediately arrested.
- 1917 – World War I: British General Edmund Allenby enters Jerusalem on foot and declares martial law.
- 1920 – Irish War of Independence: In retaliation for a recent IRA ambush, British forces burn and loot numerous buildings in Cork city. Many civilians report being beaten, shot at, robbed and verbally abused by British forces.
- 1925 – Roman Catholic papal encyclical Quas primas introduces the Feast of Christ the King.
- 1927 – Guangzhou Uprising: Communist Red Guards launch an uprising in Guangzhou, China, taking over most of the city and announcing the formation of a Guangzhou Soviet.
- 1931 – Statute of Westminster 1931: The British Parliament establishes legislative equality between the UK and the Dominions of the Commonwealth—Australia, Canada, Newfoundland, New Zealand, South Africa, and Ireland.
- 1934 – Bill Wilson, co-founder of Alcoholics Anonymous, takes his last drink and enters treatment for the final time.
- 1936 – Abdication Crisis: Edward VIII's abdication as King of the United Kingdom and the British Dominions beyond the Seas, and Emperor of India, becomes effective.
- 1937 – Second Italo-Ethiopian War: Italy leaves the League of Nations.
- 1941 – World War II: Germany and Italy declare war on the United States, following the Americans' declaration of war on the Empire of Japan in the wake of the attack on Pearl Harbor. The United States, in turn, declares war on them.
- 1941 – World War II: Poland declares war on the Empire of Japan.
- 1941 – World War II: The Imperial Japanese Navy suffers its first loss of surface vessels during the Battle of Wake Island.
- 1946 – The United Nations International Children's Emergency Fund (UNICEF) is established.
- 1948 – Arab–Israeli War: The United Nations passes General Assembly Resolution 194, creating a Conciliation Commission to mediate the conflict.
- 1958 – French Upper Volta and French Dahomey gain self-government from France, becoming the Republic of Upper Volta (now Burkina Faso) and the Republic of Dahomey (now Benin), respectively, and joining the French Community.
- 1960 – French forces crack down in a violent clash with protesters in French Algeria during a visit by French president Charles de Gaulle.
- 1962 – Arthur Lucas, convicted of murder, is the last person to be executed in Canada.
- 1964 – Che Guevara speaks at the United Nations General Assembly in New York City.
- 1972 – Apollo 17 becomes the sixth and final Apollo mission to land on the Moon.
- 1978 – The Lufthansa heist is committed by a group led by Lucchese family associate Jimmy Burke. It was the largest cash robbery ever committed on American soil, at that time.
- 1980 – The Comprehensive Environmental Response, Compensation, and Liability Act (also known as Superfund) is enacted by the U.S. Congress.
- 1981 – El Mozote massacre: Armed forces in El Salvador kill an estimated 900 civilians in an anti-guerrilla campaign during the Salvadoran Civil War.
- 1988 – A Soviet Air Force Il-76 aircraft crashes while participating in the Armenian earthquake relief, killing 78 people.
- 1990 – Demonstrations by students and workers across Albania begin, which eventually trigger the fall of communism in Albania.
- 1990 – Several fatal collisions in the 1990 Interstate 75 fog disaster result in a total of 12 deaths and 42 being injured
- 1993 – A block of the Highland Towers condominium complex collapses following a landslide caused by heavy rain and water flowing from a construction site at Ampang district in Kuala Lumpur, Malaysia. 48 of its residents die, including one who died in hospital after being rescued alive, leaving only two survivors.
- 1994 – First Chechen War: Russian president Boris Yeltsin orders Russian troops into Chechnya.
- 1994 – A bomb explodes on Philippine Airlines Flight 434, en route from Manila, Philippines, to Tokyo, Japan, killing one. The captain is able to land the plane safely.
- 1997 – The Kyoto Protocol, an agreement committing countries to reduce greenhouse gas emissions, opens for signature.
- 1998 – Thai Airways Flight 261 crashes near Surat Thani Airport, killing 101. The pilot flying the Airbus A310-200 is thought to have suffered spatial disorientation.
- 1999 – SATA Air Açores Flight 530M crashes into Pico da Esperança on São Jorge Island in the Azores, killing 35.
- 2001 – China joins the World Trade Organization (WTO).
- 2005 – The Buncefield Oil Depot catches fire in Hemel Hempstead, England.
- 2005 – Cronulla riots: Thousands of White Australians demonstrate against ethnic violence resulting in a riot against anyone thought to be Lebanese in Cronulla, New South Wales; these are followed up by retaliatory ethnic attacks on Cronulla.
- 2006 – The International Conference to Review the Global Vision of the Holocaust is opened in Tehran, Iran, by then-president Mahmoud Ahmadinejad; nations such as Israel and the United States express concern.
- 2006 – Felipe Calderón, the president of Mexico, launches a military-led offensive to put down the drug cartel violence in the state of Michoacán. This effort is often regarded as the first event in the Mexican drug war.
- 2007 – Insurgency in the Maghreb: Two car bombs explode in Algiers, Algeria, one near the Supreme Constitutional Court and the other near the offices of the United Nations.
- 2008 – Bernie Madoff is arrested and charged with securities fraud in a $50 billion Ponzi scheme.
- 2009 – Finnish game developer Rovio Entertainment releases the hit mobile game Angry Birds internationally on iOS.
- 2012 – At least 125 people are killed and up to 200 injured in bombings in the Alawite village of Aqrab, Syria.
- 2017 – New York City Subway bombing: A pipe bomb partially detonates in the New York City Subway, in the Times Square–42nd Street/Port Authority Bus Terminal. Four people are injured, including the perpetrator.
- 2019 – The results of the 2019 Bougainvillean independence referendum are announced. The results are overwhelmingly one-sided. Over 98% of voters vote for Bougainville's independence.
- 2020 – The Food and Drug Administration issues an Emergency Use Authorization on the Pfizer–BioNTech COVID-19 vaccine, the first COVID-19 vaccine to be approved by the agency.

== Births ==
=== Pre-1600 ===
- 1445 – Eberhard I, Duke of Württemberg (died 1496)
- 1465 – Ashikaga Yoshihisa, Japanese shogun (died 1489)
- 1475 – Pope Leo X (died 1521)
- 1566 – Manuel Cardoso, Portuguese organist and composer (died 1650)
- 1595 – Hŏ Mok, Korean politician, poet and scholar (died 1682)

=== 1601–1900 ===
- 1613 – Amar Singh Rathore, Rajput nobleman (died 1644)
- 1712 – Francesco Algarotti, Italian poet, philosopher, and critic (died 1764)
- 1725 – George Mason, American lawyer and politician (died 1792)
- 1758 – Carl Friedrich Zelter, German composer, conductor, and educator (died 1832)
- 1761 – Gian Domenico Romagnosi, Italian physicist, economist, and jurist (died 1835)
- 1781 – David Brewster, Scottish physicist, mathematician, and astronomer (died 1868)
- 1801 – Christian Dietrich Grabbe, German poet and playwright (died 1836)
- 1803 – Hector Berlioz, French composer, conductor, and critic (died 1869)
- 1810 – Alfred de Musset, French dramatist, poet, and novelist (died 1857)
- 1830 – Kamehameha V of Hawaii (died 1872)
- 1837 – Webster Paulson, English civil engineer (died 1887)
- 1838 – John Labatt, Canadian brewer and businessman (died 1915)
- 1843 – Robert Koch, German microbiologist and physician, Nobel Prize laureate (died 1910)
- 1854 – Charles "Old Hoss" Radbourn, American baseball pitcher (died 1897)
- 1856 – Georgi Plekhanov, Russian philosopher, theorist, and author (died 1918)
- 1858 – Vladimir Nemirovich-Danchenko, Russian director, producer, and playwright (died 1943)
- 1861 – Frederick Eveleigh-de-Moleyns, 5th Baron Ventry, British Army officer and Anglo-Irish peer (died 1923)
- 1863 – Annie Jump Cannon, American astronomer and academic (died 1941)
- 1872 – René Bull, British illustrator and photographer (died 1942)
- 1873 – Josip Plemelj, Slovenian mathematician and academic (died 1967)
- 1875 – Yehuda Leib Maimon, Moldovan-Israeli rabbi and politician (died 1962)
- 1880 – Frank Tarrant, Australian cricketer and umpire (died 1951)
- 1882 – Subramania Bharati, Indian journalist and poet (died 1921)
- 1882 – Max Born, German physicist and mathematician, Nobel Prize laureate (died 1970)
- 1882 – Fiorello H. La Guardia, American lawyer and politician, 99th Mayor of New York City (died 1947)
- 1884 – Piet Ooms, Dutch swimmer and water polo player (died 1961)
- 1889 – Walter Knott, American farmer and businessman, founded Knott's Berry Farm (died 1981)
- 1890 – Carlos Gardel, French-Argentinian singer-songwriter and actor (died 1935)
- 1890 – Mark Tobey, American-Swiss painter and educator (died 1976)
- 1892 – Arnold Majewski, Finnish military hero of Polish descent (died 1942)
- 1893 – Leo Ornstein, Russian-American pianist and composer (died 2002)
- 1897 – Ronald Skirth, English soldier (died 1977)
- 1899 – Julio de Caro, Argentinian violinist, composer, and conductor (died 1980)
- 1900 – Hermína Týrlová, Czech animator, screenwriter and film director (died 1993)
- 1900 – Gerd Arntz, German Modernist artist, co-creator of Isotype (died 1988)

=== 1901–present ===
- 1904 – Marge, American cartoonist (died 1993)
- 1905 – Robert Henriques, English farmer, author, and broadcaster (died 1967)
- 1905 – Gilbert Roland, Mexican-American actor and singer (died 1994)
- 1908 – Elliott Carter, American composer and academic (died 2012)
- 1908 – Manoel de Oliveira, Portuguese actor, director, producer, and screenwriter (died 2015)
- 1908 – Hákun Djurhuus, Faroese educator and politician, fourth Prime Minister of the Faroe Islands (died 1987)
- 1908 – Amon Göth, Austrian Nazi war criminal (died 1946)
- 1909 – Ronald McKie, Australian soldier, journalist, and author (died 1991)
- 1910 – Mildred Cleghorn, Native American chairwoman and educator (died 1997)
- 1911 – Val Guest, English-American director, producer, screenwriter, and composer (died 2006)
- 1911 – Naguib Mahfouz, Egyptian author, playwright, and screenwriter, Nobel Prize laureate (died 2006)
- 1911 – Qian Xuesen, Chinese aerodynamicist and academic (died 2009)
- 1912 – Carlo Ponti, Italian-Swiss film producer (died 2007)
- 1913 – Jean Marais, French actor and director (died 1998)
- 1916 – Elena Garro, Mexican author and playwright (died 1998)
- 1916 – Pérez Prado, Cuban-Mexican singer-songwriter, pianist, and bandleader (died 1989)
- 1918 – Clinton Adams, American painter and historian (died 2002)
- 1918 – Aleksandr Solzhenitsyn, Russian novelist, historian, and short story writer, Nobel Prize laureate (died 2008)
- 1919 – Cliff Michelmore, English television host and producer (died 2016)
- 1919 – Marie Windsor, American actress (died 2000)
- 1920 – Mary Ivy Burks, American environmental activist (died 2007)
- 1920 – Denis Jenkinson, English motorcycle racer and journalist (died 1996)
- 1921 – Ilmar Laaban, Estonian poet and publicist (died 2000)
- 1921 – Liz Smith, English actress (died 2016)
- 1922 – Grigoris Bithikotsis, Greek singer-songwriter (died 2005)
- 1922 – Dilip Kumar, Indian actor, director, and screenwriter (died 2021)
- 1922 – Maila Nurmi, Finnish-American actress, producer, and screenwriter (died 2008)
- 1922 – Grace Paley, American short story writer and poet (died 2007)
- 1923 – Betsy Blair, American actress and dancer (died 2009)
- 1923 – Lillian Cahn, Hungarian-born American businesswoman, co-founded Coach, Inc. (died 2013)
- 1923 – Morrie Turner, American comics creator (died 2014)
- 1924 – Doc Blanchard, American football player and colonel (died 2009)
- 1925 – Aaron Feuerstein, American businessman and philanthropist (died 2021)
- 1925 – Paul Greengard, American neuroscientist and academic, Nobel Prize laureate (died 2019)
- 1925 – James Sullivan, American politician (died 2012)
- 1926 – Big Mama Thornton, American singer-songwriter (died 1984)
- 1927 – John Buscema, American illustrator (died 2002)
- 1929 – Axel Anderson, German actor and production manager (died 2012)
- 1929 – Subhash Gupte, Indian cricketer (died 2002)
- 1930 – Chus Lampreave, Spanish actress (died 2016)
- 1930 – Jean-Louis Trintignant, French actor, director, and screenwriter (died 2022)
- 1931 – Ernie Beck, American basketball player (died 2024)
- 1931 – Ronald Dworkin, American philosopher and scholar (died 2013)
- 1931 – Rita Moreno, Puerto Rican actress, singer, and dancer
- 1931 – Pierre Pilote, Canadian ice hockey player (died 2017)
- 1931 – Rajneesh, Indian guru, mystic, and educator (died 1990)
- 1932 – Enrique Bermúdez, Nicaraguan colonel and engineer (died 1991)
- 1932 – Keith Waldrop, American author and poet (died 2023)
- 1933 – Aquilino Pimentel, Jr., Filipino civil servant and politician, 23rd President of the Senate of the Philippines (died 2019)
- 1934 – Salim Durani, Afghan-Indian cricketer (died 2023)
- 1935 – Pranab Mukherjee, Indian journalist and politician, 13th President of India (died 2020)
- 1935 – Elmer Vasko, Canadian ice hockey player (died 1998)
- 1936 – Hans van den Broek, Dutch lawyer and politician, Dutch Minister of Foreign Affairs
- 1936 – Taku Yamasaki, Japanese politician
- 1937 – Jim Harrison, American novelist, essayist, and poet (died 2016)
- 1938 – Enrico Macias, Algerian-French singer-songwriter and guitarist
- 1938 – McCoy Tyner, American jazz musician (died 2020)
- 1939 – Tom Hayden, American activist and politician (died 2016)
- 1939 – Thomas McGuane, American novelist, short story writer, and screenwriter
- 1940 – David Gates, American singer-songwriter, guitarist, and producer
- 1940 – Donna Mills, American actress and producer
- 1941 – Max Baucus, American lawyer, politician, and diplomat, 11th United States Ambassador to China
- 1941 – J. P. Parisé, Canadian ice hockey player, coach, and manager (died 2015)
- 1941 – Rogier van Otterloo, Dutch conductor and composer (died 1988)
- 1941 – J. Frank Wilson, American singer-songwriter (died 1991)
- 1942 – Anna Carteret, English actress
- 1943 – John Kerry, American lieutenant, lawyer, and politician, 68th United States Secretary of State
- 1944 – Teri Garr, American actress and comedian (died 2024)
- 1944 – Jon Garrison, American tenor and educator
- 1944 – Lynda Day George, American actress
- 1944 – Michael Lang, American concert promoter and producer (died 2022)
- 1944 – Brenda Lee, American singer-songwriter
- 1946 – Rhoma Irama, Indonesian singer-songwriter, guitarist, and actor
- 1946 – Rick McCosker, Australian cricketer
- 1946 – Diana Palmer, American journalist and author
- 1948 – Stamatis Spanoudakis, Greek guitarist and composer
- 1948 – Shinji Tanimura, Japanese singer-songwriter (died 2023)
- 1949 – Christina Onassis, Greek-Argentine businesswoman, socialite, and heiress (died 1988)
- 1951 – Mazlan Othman, Malaysian astrophysicist and astronomer
- 1951 – Ria Stalman, Dutch discus thrower and shot putter
- 1953 – Bess Armstrong, American actress
- 1954 – Brad Bryant, American golfer
- 1954 – Sylvester Clarke, Barbadian cricketer (died 1999)
- 1954 – Santiago Creel, Mexican lawyer and politician, Mexican Secretary of the Interior
- 1954 – Jermaine Jackson, American singer-songwriter, bass player, and producer
- 1954 – Guðlaugur Kristinn Óttarsson, Icelandic guitarist, mathematician, and engineer
- 1955 – Gene Grossman, American economist and academic
- 1955 – Stu Jackson, American basketball player, coach, and manager
- 1955 – Ray Kelvin, British fashion designer
- 1955 – Christian Sackewitz, German footballer and manager
- 1956 – Lani Brockman, American actress and director
- 1956 – Andrew Lansley, English politician, Secretary of State for Health
- 1957 – Peter Bagge, American author and illustrator
- 1958 – Chris Hughton, English-born Irish footballer and manager
- 1958 – Tom Shadyac, American actor, director, producer, and screenwriter
- 1958 – Nikki Sixx, American bass player, songwriter, and producer
- 1960 – Anders Eldebrink, Swedish ice hockey player and coach
- 1961 – Dave King, Irish-American singer-songwriter and guitarist
- 1961 – Steve Nicol, Scottish footballer and manager
- 1961 – Macky Sall, Senegalese engineer and politician, fourth President of Senegal
- 1961 – Marco Pierre White, English chef and mentor
- 1962 – Ben Browder, American actor
- 1963 – Mario Been, Dutch footballer and manager
- 1963 – Mark Greatbatch, New Zealand cricketer
- 1963 – Claudia Kohde-Kilsch, German tennis player
- 1963 – John Lammers, Dutch footballer and manager
- 1963 – Nigel Winterburn, English footballer and coach
- 1964 – Justin Currie, Scottish singer-songwriter and guitarist
- 1964 – Dave Schools, American singer-songwriter, bass player, and producer
- 1964 – Carolyn Waldo, Canadian swimmer and sportscaster
- 1965 – Jay Bell, American baseball player and coach
- 1965 – Gavin Hill, New Zealand rugby player
- 1965 – Glenn Lazarus, Australian rugby league player and politician
- 1965 – Giannis Ragousis, Greek economist and politician, Greek Minister for National Defence
- 1966 – Gary Dourdan, American actor
- 1966 – Erik Honoré, Norwegian guitarist and producer
- 1966 – Göran Kropp, Swedish race car driver and mountaineer (died 2002)
- 1966 – Leon Lai, Hong Kong singer and actor
- 1967 – Peter Kelamis, Australian voice actor
- 1967 – Mo'Nique, American comedian, actress, and producer
- 1967 – Chris Shepherd, English animator, director, producer, and screenwriter
- 1967 – Katy Steding, American basketball player and coach
- 1968 – Emmanuelle Charpentier, French researcher in microbiology, genetics and biochemistry, and Nobel laureate
- 1968 – Fabrizio Ravanelli, Italian footballer and manager
- 1969 – Viswanathan Anand, Indian chess player
- 1969 – Stig Inge Bjørnebye, Norwegian footballer and manager
- 1969 – Max Martini, American actor, director, and screenwriter
- 1969 – Alessandro Melli, Italian footballer and manager
- 1970 – Victoria Fuller, American model and actress
- 1971 – Willie McGinest, American football player and sportscaster
- 1972 – Daniel Alfredsson, Swedish ice hockey player
- 1972 – Sami Al-Jaber, Saudi Arabian footballer and manager
- 1972 – Murray Goodwin, Zimbabwean cricketer
- 1972 – Andriy Husin, Ukrainian footballer and manager (died 2014)
- 1973 – Mos Def, American rapper
- 1974 – Maarten Lafeber, Dutch golfer
- 1974 – Rey Mysterio, American wrestler
- 1974 – Lisa Ortiz, American theatre and voice actress
- 1974 – Ben Shephard, English journalist and television host
- 1974 – Gete Wami, Ethiopian runner
- 1975 – Gerben de Knegt, Dutch cyclist
- 1976 – Shareef Abdur-Rahim, American basketball player, coach, and manager
- 1976 – Yujiro Shirakawa, Japanese actor
- 1977 – Mark Streit, Swiss ice hockey player
- 1978 – Roy Wood, Jr., American comedian, actor, and radio host
- 1979 – Colleen Hoover, American author
- 1979 – Valdis Mintals, Estonian figure skater
- 1979 – Rider Strong, American actor, director, producer, and screenwriter
- 1980 – Adi Keissar, Israeli poet
- 1980 – Kristjan Kitsing, Estonian basketball player
- 1981 – Rebekkah Brunson, American basketball player and coach
- 1981 – Jason Kennedy, American journalist
- 1981 – Jeff McComsey, American author and illustrator
- 1981 – Paul Medhurst, Australian footballer
- 1981 – Javier Saviola, Argentine footballer
- 1982 – Roman Harper, American football player
- 1982 – Pablo Pérez Companc, Argentine race car driver
- 1984 – Leighton Baines, English footballer
- 1984 – Sandra Echeverría, Mexican actress and singer
- 1984 – James Ellsworth, American wrestler
- 1984 – Xosha Roquemore, American actress
- 1985 – Karla Souza, Mexican actress
- 1986 – Roy Hibbert, American basketball player
- 1987 – Violetta Bock, German politician
- 1987 – Clifton Geathers, American football player
- 1987 – Alex Russell, Australian actor
- 1987 – Miranda Tapsell, Australian actress
- 1988 – Tim Southee, New Zealand cricketer
- 1989 – Kellie Harrington, Irish boxer
- 1990 – Alexa Demie, American actress and singer
- 1992 – Tiffany Alvord, American singer-songwriter
- 1992 – Malcolm Brogdon, American basketball player
- 1993 – Yalitza Aparicio, Mexican actress
- 1995 – Abbi Grant, Scottish footballer
- 1996 – Hailee Steinfeld, American actress, singer and songwriter
- 1997 – Matthew Tkachuk, American ice hockey player
- 2000 – Onyeka Okongwu, American basketball player

== Deaths ==
=== Pre-1600 ===
- 384 – Pope Damasus I (born c.304)
- 861 – Al-Fath ibn Khaqan, chief confidant and councillor to al-Mutawakkil
- 969 – Nikephoros II Phokas, Byzantine emperor (born 912)
- 1121 – Al-Afdal Shahanshah, Egyptian political adviser (born 1066)
- 1198 – Averroes, Spanish astronomer, physicist, and philosopher (born 1126)
- 1241 – Ögedei Khan, Mongolian emperor (born 1186)
- 1282 – Llywelyn ap Gruffudd, Welsh prince (born 1223)
- 1282 – Michael VIII Palaiologos, Byzantine emperor (born 1225)
- 1474 – Henry IV of Castile, King of the Crown of Castile (born 1425)
- 1532 – Pietro Accolti, Italian cardinal (born 1455)
- 1582 – Fernando Álvarez de Toledo, 3rd Duke of Alba, Spanish general and politician, 12th Constable of Portugal (born 1508)

=== 1601–1900 ===
- 1610 – Adam Elsheimer, German artist working in Rome (born 1578)
- 1686 – Louis, Grand Condé, French general (born 1621)
- 1694 – Ranuccio II Farnese, Duke of Parma (born 1630)
- 1737 – John Strype, English priest, historian, and author (born 1643)
- 1747 – Edmund Curll, English bookseller and publisher (born 1675)
- 1797 – Richard Brocklesby, English physician (born 1722)
- 1826 – Maria Leopoldina of Austria (born 1797)
- 1840 – Emperor Kōkaku of Japan (born 1771)
- 1872 – Kamehameha V of Hawaii (born 1830)
- 1880 – Oliver Winchester, American businessman, founded the Winchester Repeating Arms Company (born 1810)
- 1892 – William Milligan, Scottish theologian and scholar (born 1821)

=== 1901–present ===
- 1906 – Charles Townsend, American fencer, engineer, and academic (born 1872)
- 1909 – Ludwig Mond, German-born chemist and British industrialist who discovered the metal carbonyls (born 1839)
- 1913 – Carl von In der Maur, Governor of Liechtenstein (born 1852)
- 1918 – Ivan Cankar, Slovenian author, poet, and playwright (born 1876)
- 1920 – Olive Schreiner, South African author and activist (born 1855)
- 1928 – Juho Kekkonen, Finnish forestry manager and tenant farmer (born 1873)
- 1936 – Myron Grimshaw, American baseball player (born 1875)
- 1937 – Jaan Anvelt, Estonian theorist and politician (born 1884)
- 1937 – Hugh Thackeray Turner, English architect and painter (born 1853)
- 1938 – Christian Lous Lange, Norwegian historian and educator, Nobel Prize laureate (born 1869)
- 1941 – John Gillespie Magee, Jr., American pilot and poet (born 1922)
- 1941 – Émile Picard, French mathematician and academic (born 1856)
- 1945 – Charles Fabry, French physicist and academic (born 1867)
- 1950 – Leslie Comrie, New Zealand astronomer and author (born 1893)
- 1951 – Mustafa Muğlalı, Turkish general (born 1882)
- 1951 – Hijri Dede, Iraqi Turkmen poet and writer (born 1881)
- 1953 – Sedat Simavi, Turkish journalist and director (born 1896)
- 1957 – Musidora, French actress, director, producer, and screenwriter (born 1889)
- 1959 – Jim Bottomley, American baseball player and manager (born 1900)
- 1964 – Sam Cooke, American singer-songwriter (born 1931)
- 1964 – Percy Kilbride, American actor (born 1888)
- 1966 – Augusta Fox Bronner, American psychologist, specialist in juvenile psychology (born 1881)
- 1968 – Richard Sagrits, Estonian painter and author (born 1910)
- 1968 – Arthur Hays Sulzberger, American publisher (born 1891)
- 1971 – Maurice McDonald, American businessman, co-founded McDonald's (born 1902)
- 1975 – Lee Wiley, American singer (born 1908)
- 1975 – Nihal Atsız, Turkish philosopher, author, and poet (born 1905)
- 1978 – Vincent du Vigneaud, American biochemist and academic, Nobel Prize laureate (born 1901)
- 1978 – Paul O'Dea, American baseball player and manager (born 1920)
- 1979 – James J. Gibson, American psychologist and author (born 1904)
- 1983 – Neil Ritchie, Guyanese-English general (born 1897)
- 1984 – Oskar Seidlin, German-American author, poet, and scholar (born 1911)
- 1984 – George Waggner, American director, producer and actor (born 1894)
- 1987 – G. A. Kulkarni, Indian author and academic (born 1923)
- 1989 – Louise Dahl-Wolfe, American photographer (born 1895)
- 1991 – Robert Q. Lewis, American actor, comedian, game show host/panelist, and television personality (born 1921)
- 1991 – Artur Lundkvist, Swedish author and critic (born 1906)
- 1994 – Philip Phillips, American archaeologist and scholar (born 1900)
- 1995 – Greg Bahnsen, American minister and philosopher (born 1948)
- 1996 – Willie Rushton, English cartoonist, author, and publisher, co-founded Private Eye (born 1937)
- 1997 – Eddie Chapman, English spy (born 1914)
- 1997 – Simon Jeffes, English guitarist and composer (born 1949)
- 1998 – André Lichnerowicz, French physicist and mathematician (born 1915)
- 1998 – Lynn Strait, American singer-songwriter (born 1968)
- 2000 – Shaista Suhrawardy Ikramullah, Pakistani politician and diplomat (born 1915)
- 2000 – David Lewis, American actor (born 1916)
- 2001 – Mainza Chona, Zambian lawyer and politician, first Prime Minister of Zambia (born 1930)
- 2003 – Ahmadou Kourouma, Ivorian author and playwright (born 1927)
- 2004 – José Luis Cuciuffo, Argentinian footballer (born 1962)
- 2004 – Arthur Lydiard, New Zealand runner and coach (born 1917)
- 2008 – Bettie Page, American model (born 1923)
- 2010 – Dick Hoerner, American football player (born 1922)
- 2011 – John Patrick Foley, American cardinal (born 1935)
- 2012 – Galina Vishnevskaya, Russian soprano and actress (born 1926)
- 2012 – Mendel Weinbach, Polish-Israeli rabbi and scholar (born 1933)
- 2012 – Ravi Shankar, Indian-American sitar player and composer (born 1920)
- 2013 – Nadir Afonso, Portuguese painter and architect (born 1920)
- 2013 – Barbara Branden, Canadian-American author and academic (born 1929)
- 2013 – Javier Jáuregui (boxer), Mexican boxer (born 1973)
- 2013 – Sheikh Mussa Shariefi, Indian philosopher and scholar (born 1942)
- 2014 – Hans Wallat, German conductor and director (born 1929)
- 2015 – Abish Kekilbayev, Kazakh academic and politician (born 1939)
- 2015 – H. Arnold Steinberg, Canadian businessman, philanthropist, and academic (born 1933)
- 2015 – Hema Upadhyay, Indian painter and sculptor (born 1972)
- 2015 – John "Hot Rod" Williams, American basketball player (born 1962)
- 2015 – Ken Woolley, Australian architect (born 1933)
- 2017 – Keith Chegwin, British TV presenter (born 1957)
- 2020 – James Flynn, New Zealand intelligence researcher. (born 1934)
- 2021 – Anne Rice, American author (born 1941)
- 2023 – Andre Braugher, American actor (born 1962)
- 2024 – David Bonderman, American billionaire businessman (born 1942)
- 2024 – Khalil Haqqani, Afghan politician and warlord (born 1966)
- 2024 – Purushottam Upadhyay, Indian musician, singer and composer (born 1934)

== Holidays and observances ==
- Christian feast day:
  - Cian
  - Daniel the Stylite
  - María de las Maravillas de Jesús
  - Pope Damasus I
  - Sabinus of Piacenza
  - Victoricus, Fuscian, and Gentian
  - December 11 (Eastern Orthodox liturgics)
- Establishment of Kurdish Women's Union (Iraqi Kurdistan)
- Indiana Day (United States)
- International Mountain Day
- National Tango Day (Argentina)
- Pampanga Day (Pampanga province, Philippines)
- Republic Day, the day when Upper Volta became an autonomous republic in the French Community in 1958. (Burkina Faso)
