= Thomas Mullins =

Thomas Mullins may refer to:

- Thomas Mullins, 1st Baron Ventry (1736–1824), supporter of the Union of Great Britain and Ireland
- Thomas Mullins (British Army officer) (died 1823), son of the 1st Baron, cashiered for his actions at the Battle of New Orleans
- Thomas de Moleyns, 3rd Baron Ventry (1786–1868), grandson of the 1st Baron, British soldier
- Thomas Mullins (Irish politician) (1903–1978), Irish politician
- Thomas Mullins (racehorse trainer), see 2008 Grand National
