= Baron Ventry =

Baron Ventry, of Ventry in the County of Kerry, is a title in the Peerage of Ireland.

== History ==
It was created in 1800 for Sir Thomas Mullins, 1st Baronet. He had already been created a Baronet, of Burnham in the County of Kerry, in the Baronetage of Ireland in 1797. The Mullins family claimed descent from the Norman De Moleyns family. The first Baron's grandson, the third Baron (who succeeded his uncle), resumed the alleged 'ancient' family name of De Moleyns by Royal licence in 1841. His son, the fourth Baron, sat in the House of Lords as an Irish representative peer from 1871 to 1914. Lord Ventry also assumed the additional surname of Eveleigh, which was that of an earlier ancestor. His younger son, the sixth Baron, married Evelyn Muriel Stuart Daubeny. As of 2014 the titles are held by their grandson, the eighth Baron, who succeeded his uncle in 1987. In 1966 he assumed by deed poll the surname of Daubeney de Moleyns.

The family seat now is Hill of Errol House near Errol, Perthshire. The family's former seat was Burnham House, near Dingle in County Kerry. The family sold Burnham House in the 1920s. It is now a girls' school.

== Barons Ventry (1800—) ==
- Thomas Mullins, 1st Baron Ventry (1736–1824)
  - Hon. Thomas Mullins (b?—1823)
  - William Townsend Mullins, 2nd Baron Ventry (1761–1827)
  - Hon. Townsend Mullins (1763–1799)
    - Thomas Townsend Aremberg de Moleyns, 3rd Baron Ventry (1786–1868) (born Thomas Townsend Aremberg Mullins)
      - Dayrolles Blakeney Eveleigh-de-Moleyns, 4th Baron Ventry (1828–1914) (born Dayrolles Blakeney Mullins)
        - Frederick Rossmore Wauchope Eveleigh-de-Moleyns, 5th Baron Ventry (1861–1923) (born Frederick Rossmore Wauchope de Moleyns)
        - Arthur William Eveleigh-de-Moleyns, 6th Baron Ventry (1864–1936)
          - Arthur Frederick Daubeney Olav Eveleigh-de-Moleyns, 7th Baron Ventry (1898–1987)
          - Hon. Francis Alexander Innys Eveleigh-de Moleyns (1901–1964)
            - Andrew Harold Wesley Daubeney de Moleyns, 8th Baron Ventry (1943—)
              - (1) Hon. Francis Wesley Daubeney de Moleyns (1965—)
          - John Andrew Wauchope of Niddrie Marischal (1900–1956) (born John Andrew Eveleigh-de Moleyns)
            - (2) Andrew Dermod Wauchope (1932—)
              - (3) James Andrew Wauchope (1963—)
                - (4) Angus Wauchope (1995—)
              - (5) Ian Simon Wauchope (1963—)

The heir apparent is the present holder's son the Hon. Francis Wesley Daubeney de Moleyns (born 1965).
The heir apparent's heir presumptive is the present holder's second cousin Andrew Dermod Wauchope (born 1932).
