= Flight 530 =

Flight 530 may refer to:

- British European Airways Flight 530, crashed on 7 August 1946
- SATA Air Açores Flight 530M, crashed on 11 December 1999
