= Dayrolles Eveleigh-de-Moleyns, 4th Baron Ventry =

Irish peer

The Right Honourable The Lord Ventry DL, JP

Personal details
- Born: Dayrolles Blakeney Mullins; 22 January 1828
- Died: 8 February 1914 (aged 86)
- Spouse: Harriet Wauchope (m. 1860)
- Children: Mildred Fuller-Acland-Hood, Baroness St Audries; Maud Gretton, Baroness Gretton; Lt.-Col. Frederick Eveleigh-de Moleyns, 5th Baron Ventry; Frances Conyngham, Marchioness Conyngham; Arthur Eveleigh-de Moleyns, 6th Baron Ventry; Hersey Hope, Marchioness of Linlithgow; Hon. Edward Eveleigh-de Moleyns; Hon. Richard Eveleigh-de Moleyns; Hon. John Eveleigh-de Moleyns
- Parents: Thomas de Moleyns, 3rd Baron Ventry; Eliza Theodora Blake

Dayrolles Blakeney Eveleigh-de-Moleyns, 4th Baron Ventry, DL, JP (22 January 1828 – 8 February 1914), was an Irish hereditary peer, elected as an Irish representative peer in 1871.

Lord Ventry was the son of Thomas de Moleyns, 3rd Baron Ventry. In 1860, he married Harriet, daughter of Andrew Wauchope of Niddrie Marischal. They had five sons and four daughters.

- Hon. Mildred Rose Evelyn Eveleigh-de Moleyns (d. 11 October 1949); she married Alexander Fuller-Acland-Hood, 1st Baron St Audries, and had children.
- Hon. Maud Helen Eveleigh-de Moleyns (d. 29 July 1934); she married John Gretton, 1st Baron Gretton, and had children.
- Lt.-Col. Frederick Rossmore Wauchope Eveleigh-de Moleyns, 5th Baron Ventry (11 December 1861 – 22 September 1923)
- Hon. Frances Elizabeth Sarah Eveleigh-de Moleyns (30 December 1862 – 8 July 1939), who married first Henry Francis Conyngham, 4th Marquess Conyngham, and had seven children. Secondly, she married Maj. John Russell Bedford Cameron and together had a daughter, Gretta.
- Arthur William Eveleigh-de Moleyns, 6th Baron Ventry (6 April 1864 – 6 July 1936); married Evelyn Muriel Stuart Daubeny. They had two sons and a daughter
- Hon. Hersey Alice Eveleigh-de Moleyns (31 March 1867 – 3 April 1937); she married John Hope, 1st Marquess of Linlithgow, and had children.
- Hon. Edward Dayrolles Eveleigh-de Moleyns (31 May 1871 – 7 July 1930); unmarried.
- Lt. Hon. Richard Andrew Eveleigh-de Moleyns (13 June 1874 – July 1917)
- Lt. Hon. John Gilbert Eveleigh-de Moleyns (27 May 1878 – 4 January 1928); married Marguerite Noon. They had no known issue.

Peerage of Ireland
Preceded by Thomas de Moleyns	Baron Ventry; 1868–1914	Succeeded by Frederick Eveleigh-de-Moleyns
Political offices
Preceded by The Marquess of Westmeath	Representative peer for Ireland; 1871–1914	Succeeded by The Lord Bellew
