= Samuel Gibbs =

British Army officer (1770–1815)

Sir Samuel Gibbs KCB
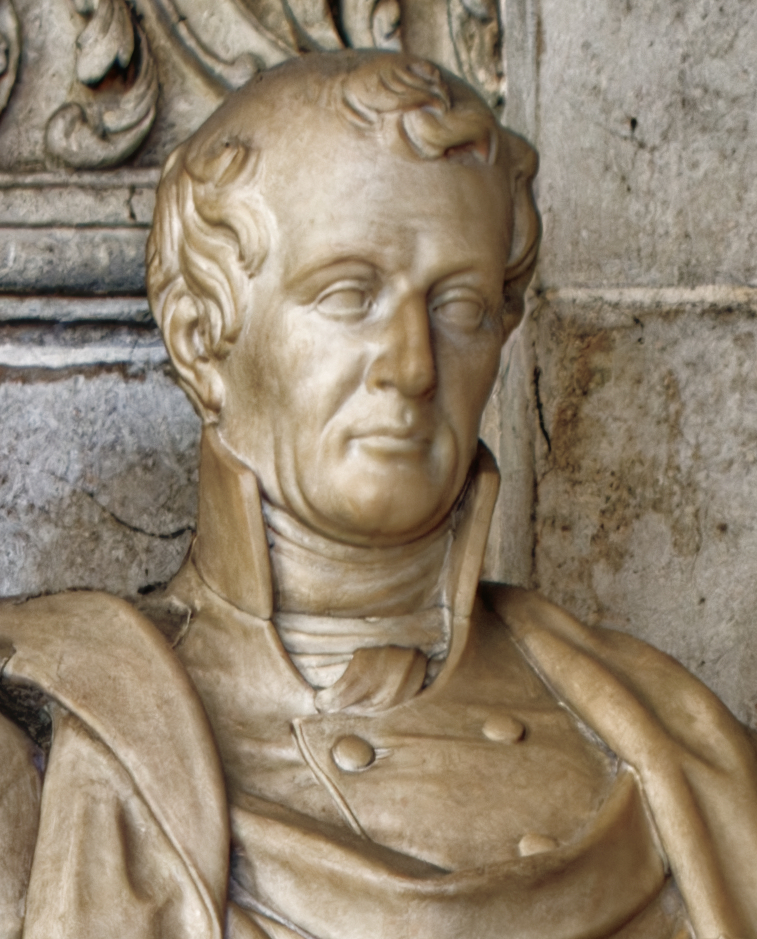
- Detail of an effigy by Westmacott
- Born: 21 February 1770; Surrey, England
- Died: 9 January 1815 (aged 44); Louisiana
- Military career
- Allegiance: Great Britain; United Kingdom
- Service: British Army
- Service years: 1783–1815
- Rank: Major-general
- Wars: French Revolutionary Wars; Expedition to Ostend (POW); Invasion of Corsica; Napoleonic Wars; War of 1812; Battle of New Orleans (DOW)

Sir Samuel Gibbs (21 February 1770 – 9 January 1815) was an English officer in the British Army during the Napoleonic Wars and the War of 1812, rising to the rank of major-general. Gibbs was second-in-command under Edward Pakenham at the Battle of New Orleans and died of wounds received while leading one of the main columns in the failed British assault.

== Life ==
Samuel Gibbs was born on 21 February 1770, the son of Colonel Samuel Gibbs of Horsley Park, Surrey, by his wife Arabella, daughter of Sir William Rowley, admiral of the fleet, and widow of William Martin (d. 1766), naval officer. His half-brother was Sir George Martin, admiral of the fleet.

Gibbs was appointed an ensign in the 102nd Foot in October 1783. He removed in 1788 to the 60th, with which he served in Upper Canada, until he was promoted in 1792 to a lieutenancy in the 11th. He joined this regiment at Gibraltar, and returned with it to England in February 1793, when he was appointed aide-de-camp to Lieutenant-general James Grant. He served with the 11th in Corsica, and on board Lord Hood's fleet in the Mediterranean from the spring of 1794 till the end of 1795, when he obtained a company.

After acting for some months as captain and adjutant in the garrison at Gibraltar, he returned to England in April 1796, and was reappointed to his former position of aide-de-camp. In May 1798 he accompanied the expedition which was sent under the command of Sir Eyre Coote to cut the sluices at Ostend, and was taken prisoner, but included in the exchange of prisoners which took place the following Christmas. In 1799 he succeeded to the rank of major, and accompanied the 11th to the West Indies, where he commanded it in an attack on Saint Martin in the expedition against the Danish and Swedish islands, and in the island of Martinique.

In 1802 he was promoted lieutenant-colonel of the 10th West India regiment, and returned to England on the declaration of peace in the same year. He was subsequently appointed to the 59th Foot, which he commanded in the expedition to the Cape of Good Hope in 1805 and 1806. From the Cape he proceeded to India, and commanded his regiment in the Travancore war of 1808–9.

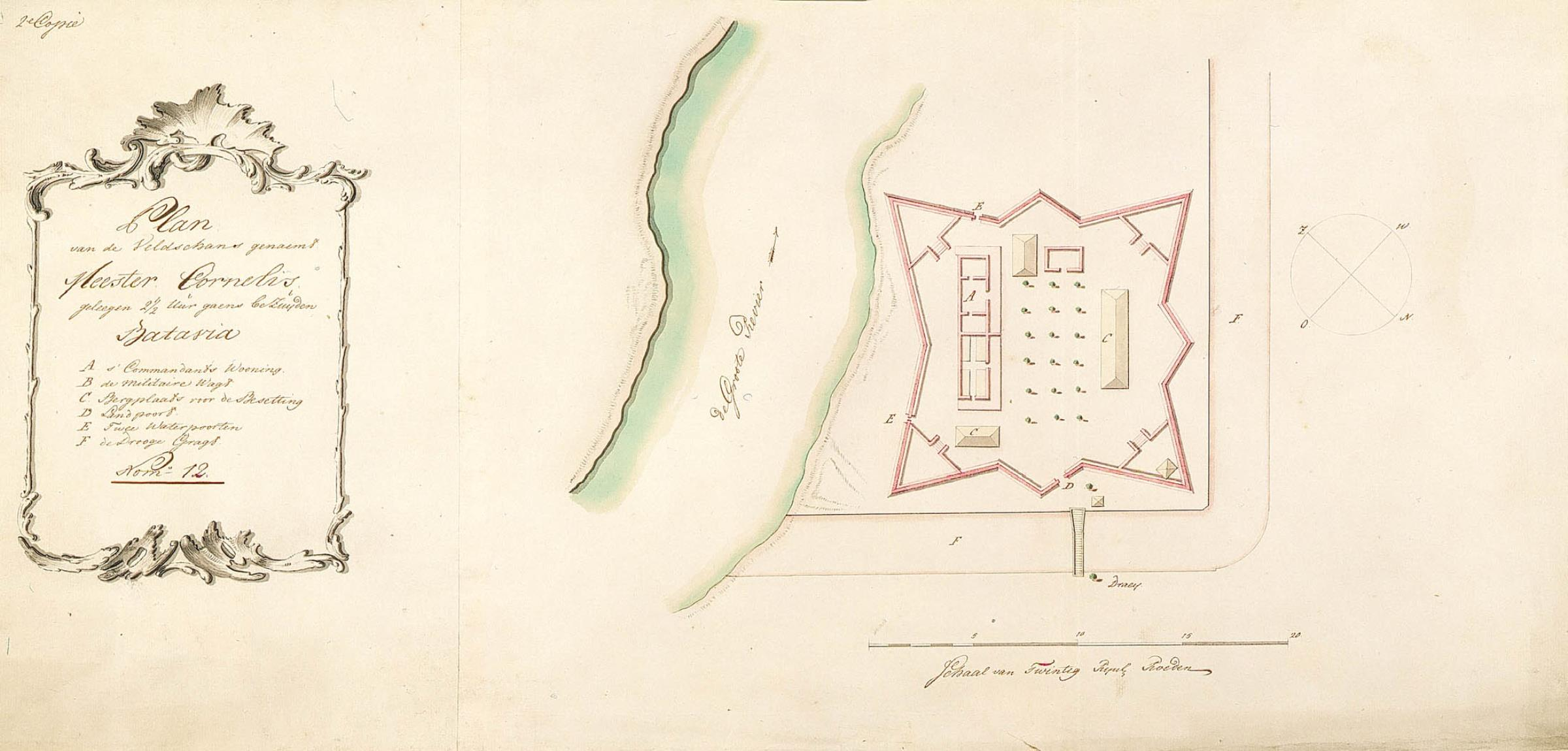
Dutch plan of Fort Cornelis, c. 1764

On 25 July 1810 he received the brevet rank of colonel, and in March 1811 accompanied the expedition under Sir Samuel Auchmuty, which was sent by Lord Minto to conquer Java from the Dutch. He greatly distinguished himself in this expedition, and is repeatedly mentioned in the despatches of Sir Samuel Auchmuty to Lord Minto. On 26 August he supported, with the 59th and the 4th battalion of Bengal Volunteers, the attack made by Colonel Gillespie on Fort Cornelis, (Note: In Thornton 1843 and Rapson 1890 called "Fort Corselis".) and took one of the redoubts of this stronghold by storm; and on 16 September he led the final attack against the Dutch general Janssens, which resulted in the surrender of the island.

Shortly afterwards Gibbs left India, and in 1812 was appointed to the command of the two British regiments stationed with the allied (Coalition) forces at Stralsund. In the following year he served in Holland, and on 4 June was appointed major-general.

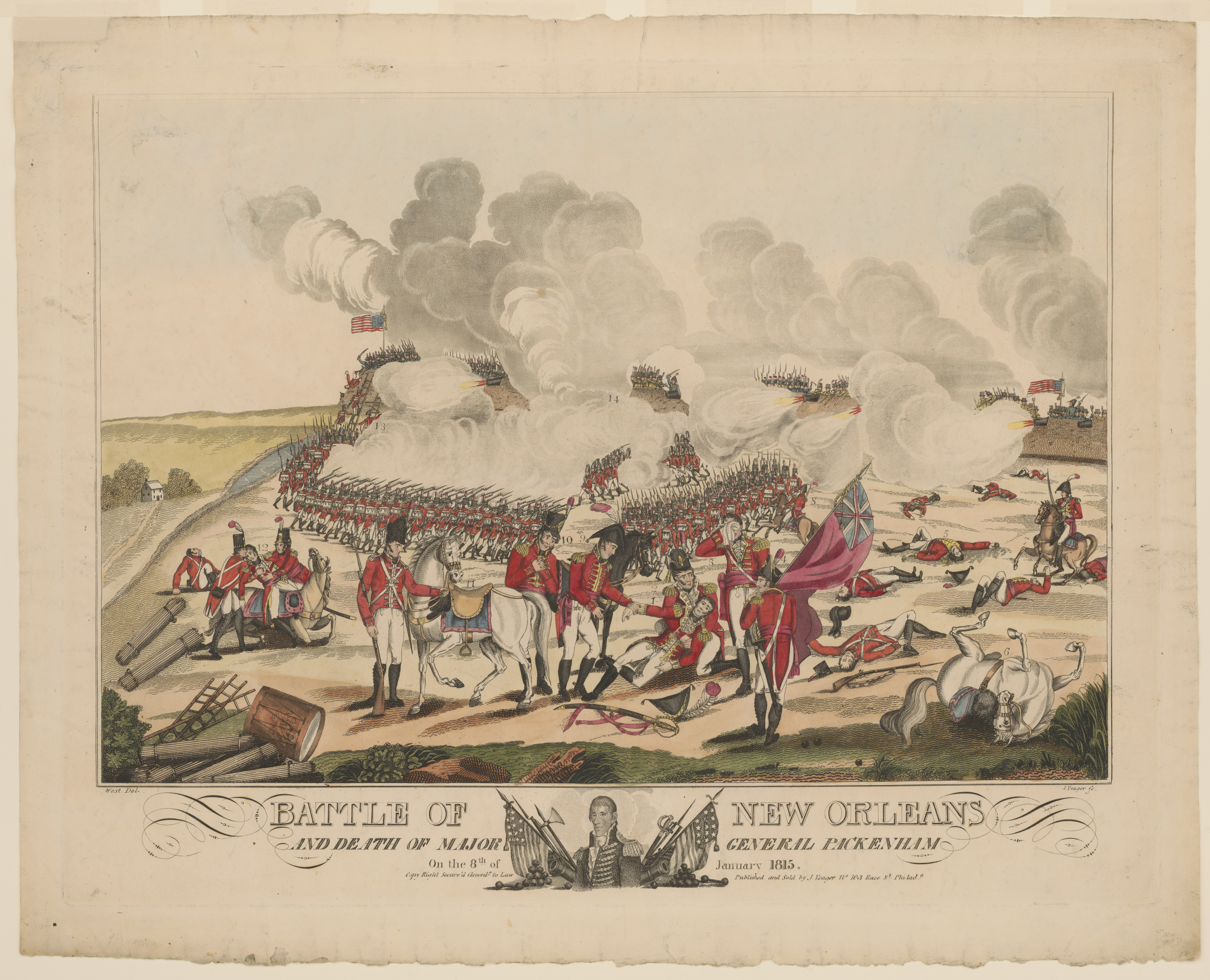
American engraving of the battle of New Orleans (1817). Gibbs is shown, mortally wounded, at left (no. 12)

In the autumn of 1814 he was appointed second in command under Sir Edward Pakenham of the expedition sent out to succour the British forces in the United States. Gibbs accompanied Pakenham aboard the frigate Statira, sailing from Spithead on 1 November 1814. The expedition landed on 23, 24 or 25 December 1814 (sources differ), and on 26 December began the operations which preceded the attack on New Orleans on 8 January. In this attack Gibbs, who commanded one of the main columns, was severely wounded while trying to rally his wavering men. He was heard yelling for his subordinate, "Colonel Mullens, if I live till tomorrow you shall be hanged from one of these trees", (Note: Colonel Thomas Mullins had failed to locate the fascines and ladders necessary to scale the American ramparts, and was later court-martialled in Dublin.) whereupon he was shot from his horse, just fifty paces from Jackson's line. Pakenham fell in the same effort to rally the flying troops at around the same time.

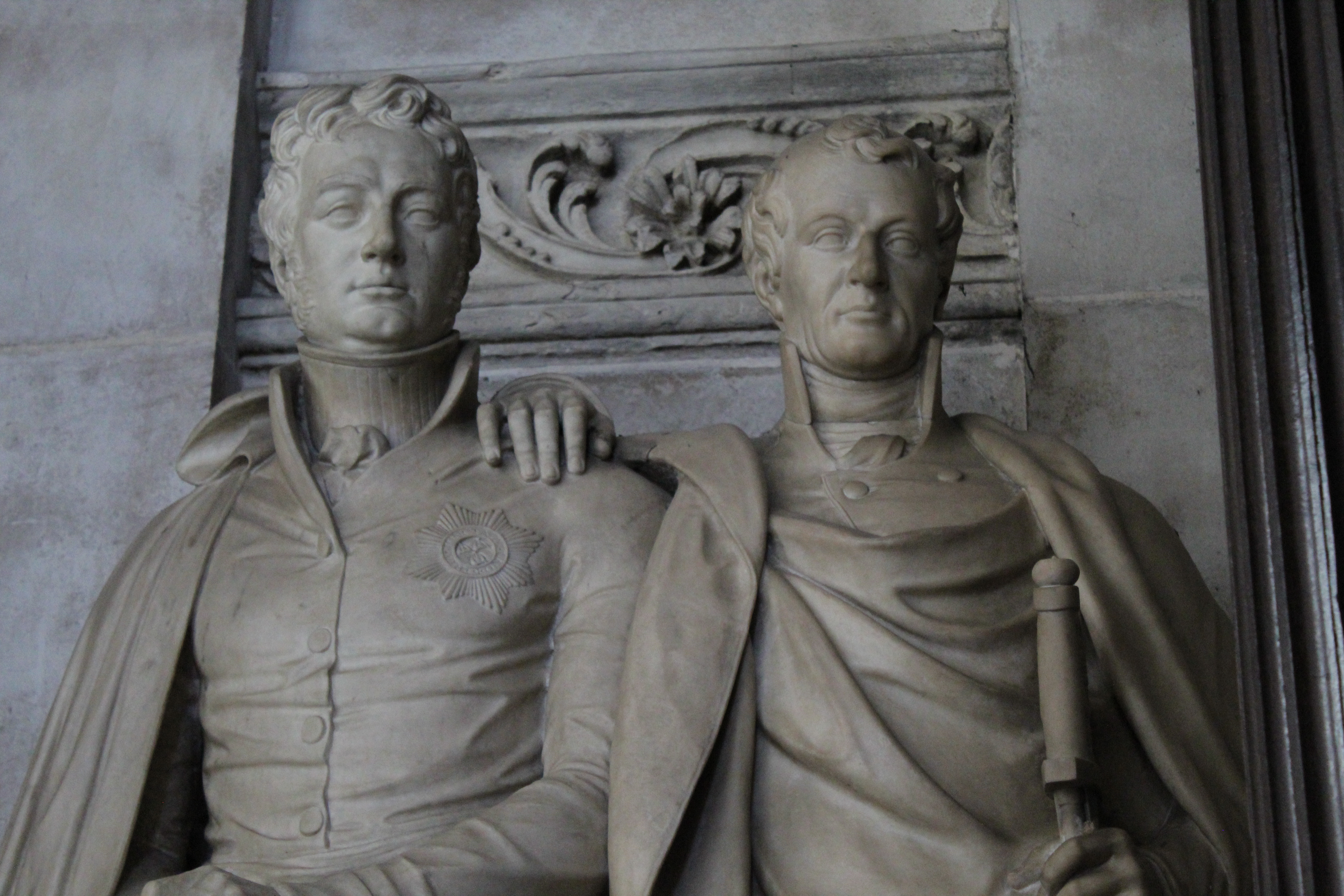
Memorial to Pakenham and Gibbs in St. Paul's Cathedral (detail)

Gibbs died on the following day, at about 10:30 am, after a painful night. By a proclamation of the Prince Regent on 2 January 1815 he had been made a knight commander of the Bath. The bodies of Gibbs and Pakenham were disembowelled and preserved in casks of rum, then shipped to England and Ireland for burial.

== Legacy ==
Gibbs's estate was inherited by his brother and two sisters. A marble free-standing monument with life-size effigies of Pakenham and Gibbs sculpted by Richard Westmacott was erected in St. Paul's Cathedral.

ERECTED AT THE PUBLIC EXPENSE
TO THE MEMORY OF
MAJOR GENERAL THE HON^{BLE.} SIR EDWARD PAKENHAM, K.B.
AND OF
MAJOR GENERAL SAMUEL GIBBS,
WHO FELL GLORIOUSLY ON THE 8^{TH.} OF JANUARY 1815,
WHILE LEADING THE TROOPS TO AN ATTACK
OF THE ENEMY'S WORKS IN FRONT OF NEW ORLEANS.

== Sources ==
- Napier, G. T. (1884). Napier, W. C. E. (ed.). Passages in the Early Military Life of General Sir George T. Napier. London: John Murray. pp. 22, 240.
- Rapson, E. J.; Harfield, Alan (2008). "Gibbs, Sir Samuel (1770–1815), army officer". Oxford Dictionary of National Biography (online ed.). Oxford University Press. doi:10.1093/ref:odnb/10607. (Subscription, Wikipedia Library access or UK public library membership required.)
- Reilly, Robin (1974). The British at the Gates: The New Orleans Campaign in the War of 1812. New York: G. P. Putnam's Sons. pp. 165, 207, 211, 251–2, 258, 260, 263, 265–6, 269, 273–5, 278, 286–93, 297–8, 301, 329, 332. ISBN 978-0-399-11266-9.
- Thornton, Edward (1843). The History of the British Empire in India. Vol. 4. London: Wm. H. Allen and Co. pp. 189–93.
- Thornton, Leslie Heber (1925). Campaigners Grave & Gay: Studies of Four Soldiers of the Eighteenth and Nineteenth Centuries. Cambridge: Cambridge University Press. pp. 122, 124–7.
- [Gleig, George Robert] (1821). A Narrative of the Campaigns of the British Army at Washington and New Orleans, under Generals Ross, Pakenham, and Lambert, in the years 1814 and 1815; with some account of the countries visited. By an Officer who served in the Expedition. London: John Murray. pp. 301, 304, 307, 322, 326–7, 334.
- "Major General The Hon Sir E Pakenham and Major General S Gibbs". Imperial War Museums. War Memorial Register.
- "Memorial to Major Generals Sir Edward Pakenham and Samuel Gibbs". Victorian Web.

Attribution:

- This article incorporates text from a publication now in the public domain: Rapson, Edward James (1890). "Gibbs, Samuel". In Stephen, Leslie (ed.). Dictionary of National Biography. Vol. 21. London: Smith, Elder & Co. p. 269.
