= William Mullins, 2nd Baron Ventry =

Anglo-Irish politician (1761–1827)

William Townsend Mullins, 2nd Baron Ventry (25 September 1761 – 5 October 1827) was an Anglo-Irish politician and peer.

Mullins was the son of Thomas Mullins, 1st Baron Ventry, and Elizabeth Gunn, the daughter of Townsend Gunn. He served as the Member of Parliament for Dingle between January and December 1800. In this capacity, he was instrumental in securing the passage of the Irish Act of Union of 1800, for which his father was awarded a peerage. He succeeded to his father's title in 1824 and died three years later.

He was married three times: firstly in 1784 to Sarah Anne Falkiner, youngest daughter of Sir Riggs Falkiner, 1st Baronet, and his only child by his second wife Anne Maturin. Sarah Anne died in 1788, leaving two daughters. He married secondly in 1790 Frances Sage, daughter of Isaac Sage; this marriage ended in 1796 with a divorce by Act of Parliament, by which both parties were free to remarry (Frances remarried Boyle O'Sullivan: she was also awarded a sum equivalent to her widow's jointure). His third wife was Clara Jones, daughter of Benjamin Jones who outlived him. She remarried Thomas Fitzgibbon Henchy. Her only child by Lord Ventry died young. He left daughters, but no surviving male issue, and was succeeded by his nephew, Thomas de Moleyns, 3rd Baron Ventry.

Peerage of Ireland
Preceded by Thomas Mullins	Baron Ventry; 1824–1827	Succeeded by Thomas de Moleyns
Baronetage of Ireland
Preceded by Thomas Mullins	Baronet (of Burnham, Kerry); 1824–1827	Succeeded by Thomas de Moleyns
