= John Wauchope, Lord Edmonstone =

Scottish lawyer (1633–1709)

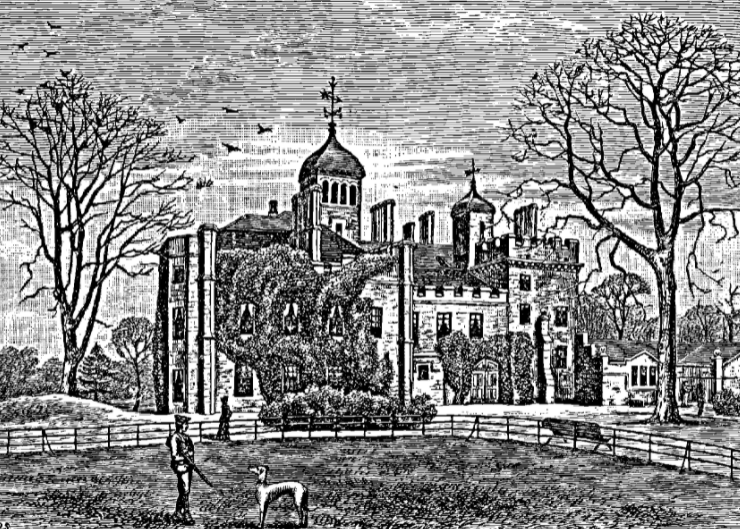
Niddrie House south of Edinburgh

John Wauchope, Lord Edmonstone (1633–1709) was a 17th-century Scottish lawyer and Senator of the College of Justice.

== Life ==
He was born at Niddrie House south of Edinburgh. the second son of Sir John Wauchope of Niddrie, who had been knighted by King Charles I in 1633.

In 1664 he married Anne Rait or Raith, daughter of James Raith, advocate, who had bought the Edmonstone estate (south of Niddrie House) from Andrew Edmonstone in 1626 (confirmed in a charter of 1630). Anne was heiress to Edmonstone House, the neighbouring estate to Niddrie, and through her Wauchope acquired the estate.

In November 1682 he was elected a Senator of the College of Justice, adopting the title Lord Edmonstone.

He died in 1709 and is buried with other family members in Woolmet where the parish church was converted into a private family mausoleum.

His nephew, General John Wauchope of Niddrie Marischal, a "zealous Covenanter", was killed in Catalonia in 1718.

Edmonstone House was rebuilt in the late 18th century. The ruins of the later Edmonstone House still exist, being largely destroyed by fire in the 1950s. These lie south of the new Edinburgh Royal Infirmary The new hospital is built in the former grounds of Edmonstone.

== Family ==
His second wife was Elizabeth Murray daughter of William Murray, Earl of Dysart and widow of Lyonell Talmash of Heyling, Suffolk. Having no children Brunstane passed to her son by her first marriage, Lyonell Earl of Dysart who sold it in 1736 to Archibald, Duke of Argyle who sold it in turn in 1746 to James 3rd Earl of Abercorn.
