= British European Airways Flight 530 =

1946 aviation accident

Coordinates: 60°22′40″N 11°9′30″E

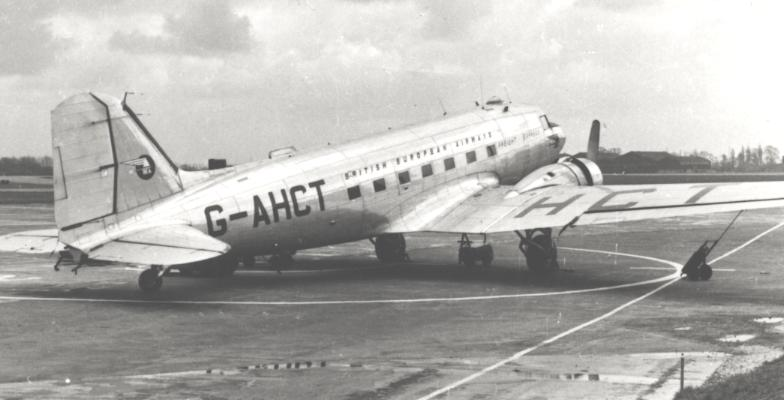
- A Douglas C-47A Skytrain, similar to the aircraft involved in the accident

Accident
- Date: 7 August 1946
- Summary: Controlled flight into terrain
- Site: Mistberget, Eidsvoll, Norway

Aircraft
- Aircraft type: Douglas C-47A Skytrain
- Operator: British European Airways
- Registration: G-AHCS
- Flight origin: Croydon Airport
- Destination: Oslo Airport, Gardermoen
- Occupants: 15
- Passengers: 10
- Crew: 5
- Fatalities: 3
- Injuries: 2
- Survivors: 12

British European Airways Flight 530, also known as the Mistberget Accident (Norwegian: Mistberget-ulykken), was a Douglas C-47 Skytrain's controlled flight into terrain, specifically into the Mistberget mountain in Eidsvoll, Norway, on 7 August 1946 at ca. 14:00. The British European Airways (BEA) aircraft was en route on a scheduled flight from London's Croydon Airport and crashed during approach to Oslo Airport, Gardermoen.

Three of the five crew members were killed in the accident and all ten passengers survived, though two were seriously injured, the remainder were able to walk away from the crash. The investigation found no faults with the aircraft, but cited a navigation error caused by a combination of insufficient training and shortcomings in the aircraft's low frequency radio range equipment.

== Flight ==
The accident aircraft was a Douglas C-47A-5-DK Skytrain, c/n 12348 and registered G-AHCS, equipped with two Pratt & Whitney R-1830-92 engines, first flown in 1944, operated by British European Airways. The flight was a scheduled service from BEA's base at Croydon Airport near London to Oslo Airport, Gardermoen. Gardermoen acted as Oslo's secondary airport to the more central Oslo Airport, Fornebu. However, BEA opted to use Gardermoen because it needed longer runways to operate the Vickers VC.1 Viking. The aircraft had a crew of five and carried ten passengers. Two of the passengers were Norwegian, the rest were British.

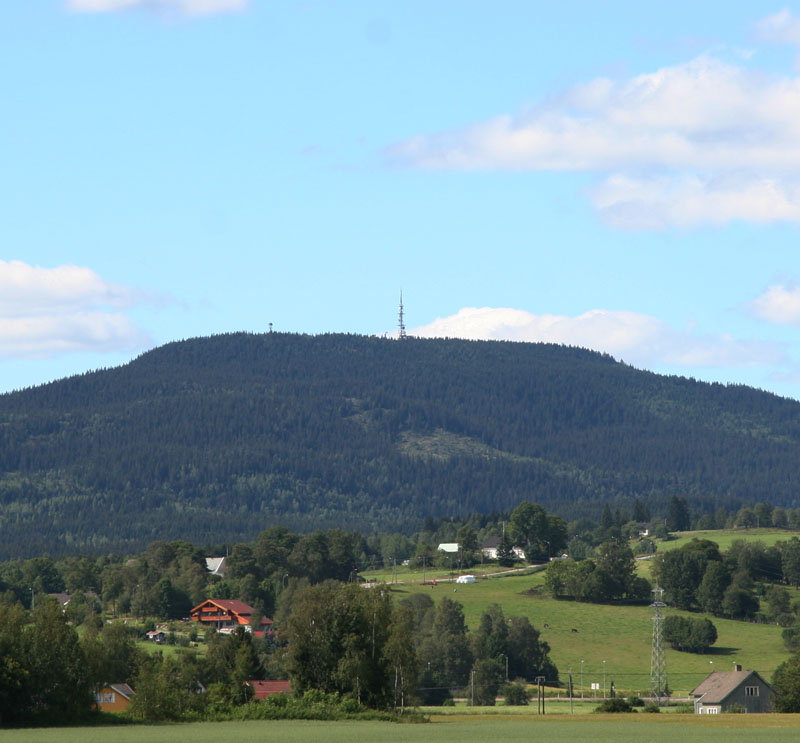
Mistberget

At 13:44, the radio operator asked air traffic control for permission to land using the low frequency radio range navigation system. Gardermoen confirmed, and noted that the Skytrain was the only aircraft in the area. There was no further radio communication between the aircraft and air traffic control. The aircraft passed the radio range station, located 8 km (5.0 mi) north of the airport and a few minutes later flew into trees on the eastern face of Mistberget at an altitude of 620 m (2,030 ft). The aircraft plowed a 100 m (330 ft) long section of forest before it came to a halt. At the time the aircraft was heading southwards, parallel with the face. The commission concluded that the aircraft was under pilot control at the time of impact.

The impact of the accident caused the engines to be knocked off and they slid 20 m (66 ft) past the airframe. Debris lay scattered in the area, with a propeller blade found 50 m (160 ft) away from the craft. Three of the crew members, the captain, first officer and radio operator, were killed upon impact.

Two of the passengers who were unhurt, one British and one Norwegian, walked from the wreck to the farm at Askheim, where they were able to notify about the accident by telephone. A crew of rescue workers were immediately dispatched from Gardermoen. They remained at the site for about four hours; the time was needed to get the steward free from the wreck. He and a passenger were severely injured and were freighted by car to Stensby Hospital. The rest of the passengers were able to walk by themselves and were treated for shock and cuts.

== Investigation and cause ==
Norway's Ministry of Transport and Communications appointed an investigation commission on the day of the accident. It was led by Major Halle and otherwise consisted of Assistant Chief of Police Skalmerud, Engineer Truls Dahl, Pilot Odd Olsen, Captain Thorleif Eriksen and a representative for British aviation authorities. Their report was published in January 1947. They concluded with that the pilot was in full control of the aircraft and there were no faults with the aircraft, a controlled flight into terrain. The asserted the cause of the accident to improper airmanship, caused by insufficient training in radio range navigation combined with shortcomings in the equipment.

At the time of the accident, there was a cloud cover of ten-tenths and a cloud base of 3,000 m (9,800 ft), giving a visibility of less than 15 km (9.3 mi). The wind was recorded at 3 kn (1.5 m/s; 3.5 mph). The aircraft's turn, road of engines and impact was heard by a witness. The passengers reported that they did not notice anything unusual until they saw spruce trees rushing past the window.

The radio range system had recently been calibrated twice and the commission found nothing wrong with the navigational aids. On the other hand, the aircraft's equipment had been turned to compass instead of antenna. This would have made the beam north of the cone of silence twenty degrees wide instead of four. Although not decisive, it was cited as giving the pilot a disadvantage in navigation. The aircraft's radio range equipment also lacked a marker beacon receiver, due to lack of sufficient parts. This forced the pilots to manually calculate the distance to the beacon. The crew carried out the procedural turn in the right area, but should, according to their route instruction book, have been at no lower an altitude than 1,000 m (3,300 ft), thus the aircraft was too low, caused by the let-down being started too early.
