= Thomas de Moleyns, 3rd Baron Ventry =

Anglo-Irish soldier and nobleman

Thomas Townsend Aremberg de Moleyns, 3rd Baron Ventry (born Mullins) (January 1786 – 18 January 1868), was an Anglo-Irish soldier and nobleman.

He was the son of Townsend Mullins, the second son of The 1st Baron Ventry, and his second wife Christabella, daughter of Solomon Dayrolles. Mullins was commissioned a lieutenant in the 7th Regiment of Foot on 5 February 1807, and served with the regiment in the Peninsular War. He fought at Busaco and Albuera and was badly wounded at the latter. He purchased a captaincy on 13 August 1811. Mullins was slightly wounded while serving with the 7th at the Battle of New Orleans, where his uncle, Thomas Mullins, commanded a regiment. He exchanged out of the 7th to take half-pay on 11 December 1817 and did not return to the Army.

On 18 August 1821, he married Eliza Theodora Blake, daughter of Sir John Blake, 11th Baronet, and his wife Rose, Mullins' first cousin. He succeeded his uncle as Baron Ventry in 1827.

On 16 February 1841, he assumed the surname of de Moleyns for himself and the other descendants of the 1st Baron Ventry. This was in token of Ventry's claim to be descended from the medieval de Moleyns family of Burnham, Norfolk, which, however, has never been firmly established.

Lord Ventry died in 1868 at Burnham House, the family seat near Dingle. He was succeeded by his eldest son, Dayrolles.

Peerage of Ireland
Preceded by William Mullins	Baron Ventry; 1827–1868	Succeeded by Dayrolles Eveleigh-de-Molyens
