= Solomon Dayrolles =

English diplomat (died 1786)

Solomon Dayrolles (died 1786) was an English diplomat.

== Life ==
Dayrolles was the nephew and heir of James Dayrolles, king's resident for some time at Geneva, and from 1717 to 1739 at The Hague, who died on 2 January 1739, was the godson of Philip Stanhope, 4th Earl of Chesterfield, the wit and politician, through whose friendship the young official obtained speedy advancement in his profession. He began his diplomatic career under James Waldegrave, 1st Earl Waldegrave, then ambassador at Vienna, and when Waldegrave became ambassador at Versailles, Chesterfield endeavoured to obtain the appointment of secretary to the embassy for his protégé; but in this he was frustrated by superior influence.

Dayrolles was sworn as gentleman of the privy chamber to George II on 27 February 1740, and retained his place in the court of George III. With the old king he quickly became a personal favourite, and was rewarded by the post of Master of the Revels (12 April 1744). He was secretary to Lord Chesterfield during the peer's second embassy to The Hague (1745), and when his patron somewhat later in the year entered on his duties as lord-lieutenant of Ireland, Dayrolles accompanied him in the same capacity, and was nominated by him gentleman usher of the black rod in the Irish House of Lords (2 September 1745), a sinecure. Through the personal liking of the king, and Chesterfield's credit with Pelham, the place of the king's residence at the Hague was given to Dayrolles on 12 May 1747. He was there for four years, and then was promoted to a similar post at Brussels, which he held until August 1757.

On his uncle's death in 1739 he inherited a fortune, and in that year he purchased from Sir Richard Child, Earl of Tylney, the estate of Henley Park, in the parish of Ash, near Guildford, which remained his property until 1785. In March 1786 he died, and in the same year his library was sold.

He was elected a Fellow of the Royal Society in 1743.

== Legacy ==
Matthew Maty was assisted in his Life of Chesterfield by Dayrolles. For years he and Lord Chesterfield kept up a correspondence; his letters from Chesterfield were initially edited by Lord Mahon. The originals were bought from the heirs of Dayrolles by Messrs. Bentley, and they then passed by purchase to Mahon (by then Lord Stanhope) in April 1846.

Dayrolles' own official correspondence and that of his uncle, consisting of twenty-one folio volumes, once belonged to William Upcott.

== Family ==
He married, on 4 July 1751, Christabella, daughter of Colonel Peterson of Ireland, who is said to have been 'a lady of accomplished manners and dignified appearance.' She died at George Street, Hanover Square, on 3 August 1791; her age at death is given as 58, so she must have been considerably younger than her husband. William Cramp, who wanted to fix the identity of Junius on Lord Chesterfield, published in 1851 a small pamphlet of Facsimile Autograph Letters of Junius, Lord Chesterfield, and Mrs. C. Dayrolles, showing that the wife of Mr. Solomon Dayrolles was the amanuensis employed in copying the Letters of Junius for the printer.

Dayrolles had issue one son, Thomas Philip Dayrolles, a captain in the 10th dragoons, who died at Lausanne, having married Mlle. H. G. Thomaset, a Swiss lady; and three daughters. Christabella, the eldest, married in 1784 the Hon. Townsend Mullins; their son was Thomas de Moleyns, 3rd Baron Ventry. Emily married, on 24 December 1786, the Baron de Reidezel, aide-de-camp to the Duke of Würtemberg; and Mary became the wife, on 6 February 1788, of Richard Croft, junior, a banker in Pall Mall. The youngest of these daughters is said to have been the prototype of the vivacious Miss Larolles in Fanny Burney's novel Cecilia.
