= List of acts of the Parliament of Scotland from 1672 =

This is a list of acts of the Parliament of Scotland for the year 1672.

It lists acts of Parliament of the old Parliament of Scotland, that was merged with the old Parliament of England to form the Parliament of Great Britain, by the Union with England Act 1707 (c. 7).

For other years, see list of acts of the Parliament of Scotland. For the period after 1707, see list of acts of the Parliament of Great Britain.

== 1672 ==
The 3rd session of the 2nd parliament of Charles II, held in Edinburgh from 12 June 1672.

Short title, or popular name	Citation	Royal assent
Long title
Militia Act 1672 (repealed)	1672 c. 1 (Note: This is the citation in the Record Edition.); 1672 c. 1 (Note: This is the citation in the Duodecimal Edition.)	25 June 1672
Act for setling the Militia. Act for setling the Militia. (Repealed by Statute Law Revision (Scotland) Act 1906 (6 Edw. 7. c. 38))
Tutors and Curators Act 1672 (repealed)	1672 c. 2; 1672 c. 2	28 June 1672
Act Concerning Pupils and Minors and their Tutors and Curators. Act Concerning Pupils and Minors and their Tutors and Curators. (Repealed by Age of Legal Capacity (Scotland) Act 1991 (c. 50))
Irish Victual Act 1672 (repealed)	1672 c. 3; 1672 c. 3	28 June 1672
Act Discharging the Importation of Irish Victuall. Act Discharging the Importation of Irish Victual. (Repealed by Statute Law Revision (Scotland) Act 1906 (6 Edw. 7. c. 38))
Supply Act 1672 (repealed)	1672 c. 4; 1672 c. 4	5 July 1672
Act for raising a new Supplie of 864000 pounds Scots offered to his Majestie. Act for raising a new Supply of 864,000 pounds Scots offered to his Majesty. (Repealed by Statute Law Revision (Scotland) Act 1906 (6 Edw. 7. c. 38))
Royal Burghs Act 1672 (repealed)	1672 c. 5; 1672 c. 5	10 July 1672
Act concerning the priveledges of Burghs Royall. Act concerning the privileges of Royal Burghs. (Repealed by Statute Law Revision (Scotland) Act 1906 (6 Edw. 7. c. 38))
Summons Execution Act 1672 (repealed)	1672 c. 6; 1672 c. 6	10 July 1672
Act Discharging Second Summonds &c. Act Discharging Second Summons, etc. (Repealed by Court of Session Act 1988 (c. 36))
Not public and general	1672 c. 7 — (Note: This act is not listed in the Duodecimal Edition.)	10 July 1672
Act in favors of James Earle of Perth (Note: James Drummond, 4th Earl of Perth.) for ane yeirlie fair and weiklie mercat in burgh of Crieff. Act in favour of James, Earl of Perth, for a yearly fair and a weekly market in the burgh of Crieff.
Not public and general	1672 c. 8 —	10 July 1672
Act in favors of John Earle of Cassills (Note: John Kennedy, 7th Earl of Cassilis.) for tuo yeerlie fairs in the burgh of Mayboill. Act in favour of John, Earl of Cassilis, for two yearly fairs in the burgh of Maybole.
Not public and general	1672 c. 9 —	10 July 1672
Act in favours of John Earle of Tueddale for tuo faires yeirlie and ane weeklie mercat in the toune of Aldhamstocks.
Not public and general	1672 c. 10 —	10 July 1672
Act in favors of the Burgh of Selkirk for ane new yeirlie fair.
Not public and general	1672 c. 11 —	10 July 1672
Act in favors of Sir George Maxwell younger of Newwark for ane yeirlie fair and weiklie mercat at the village upon the bayheid of Newwark.
Not public and general	1672 c. 12 —	10 July 1672
Act in favors of Alexander Gordoun of Glengairock for four yeirlie fairs and a weiklie mercat at the toune of Newmilne.
Not public and general	1672 c. 13 —	10 July 1672
Act in favors of Sir James Cockburne of that Ilk for two yeirlie faires at the toune of Dunce.
Not public and general	1672 c. 14 —	10 July 1672
Act anent the Colledge of Glasgow for their small rents. Act regarding the College of Glasgow for their small rents.
Not public and general	1672 c. 15 —	10 July 1672
Act anent the dimission of the Royall Burgh of Cromertie. Act regarding the demission of the Royal Burgh of Cromarty.
Writs Act 1672 still in force	1672 c. 16; 1672 c. 7	12 July 1672
Act concerning writs passing the great and privie Sealls. Act concerning writs passing the great and privy seals.
Arrestments Act 1672 (repealed)	1672 c. 17; 1672 c. 8	12 July 1672
Act concerning Arrestments used within Burghs. Act concerning Arrestments used within Burghs. (Repealed by Statute Law Revision (Scotland) Act 1906 (6 Edw. 7. c. 38))
Not public and general	1672 c. 18 —	12 July 1672
Act in favors of the Burgh of Coupar in Fyffe for two yeirlie faires. Act in favour of the burgh of Cupar in Fife, for two yearly fairs.
Not public and general	1672 c. 19 —	12 July 1672
Act in favors of Sir Andrew Ramsay of Abbotishall for two yeirlie fairs and a weeklie mercat at Lintoun in Eist Lothian.
Unlawful Ordinations Act 1672 (repealed)	1672 c. 20; 1672 c. 9	24 July 1672
Act against unlawfull Ordinations. Act against unlawfull Ordinations. (Repealed by Statute Law Repeal (No. 2) Act 1690 (c. 57))
Sumptuary Act 1672 (repealed)	1672 c. 21; 1672 c. 10	26 July 1672
Act concerning Apparrell. Act concerning Apparrel. (Repealed by Statute Law Revision (Scotland) Act 1906 (6 Edw. 7. c. 38))
Baptism Act 1672 (repealed)	1672 c. 22; 1672 c. 11	16 August 1672
Act against such who do not Baptize their Children. Act against those who do not Baptize their Children. (Repealed by Statute Law Revision (Scotland) Act 1906 (6 Edw. 7. c. 38))
Thanksgiving Act 1672 (repealed)	1672 c. 23; 1672 c. 12	21 August 1672
Act for ane Anniversary Thanksgiving. Act for an Anniversary Thanksgiving. (Repealed by Repeal (No. 2) Act 1690 (c. 58))
Ann Act 1672 (repealed)	1672 c. 24; 1672 c. 13	23 August 1672
Act for the Ann (Note: An 'ann' or annate was a payment due to the executors of a deceased minister, set at a half-year's rent of the benefice or stipend. The dictionary definition of annate at Wiktionary.) due to the Executors of Bishopes and Ministers. Act for the Annate due to the Executors of Bishops and Ministers. (Repealed by Abolition of Feudal Tenure etc. (Scotland) Act 2000 (asp 5))
Taxed Marriages Act 1672 (repealed)	1672 c. 25; 1672 c. 14	23 August 1672
Act for the Retouring of Taxt Marriages. (Repealed by Statute Law Revision (Scotland) Act 1906 (6 Edw. 7. c. 38))
Not public and general	1672 c. 26 —	23 August 1672
Act in favors of Alex^{r} Robertson of Strowane for two yeirlie faires at Keanlochranoch.
Not public and general	1672 c. 27 —	23 August 1672
Act in favors of William and Anna Duke and Dutches of Hamilton for ane yeirlie fair and weiklie mercat at the toun of Redding.
Not public and general	1672 c. 28 —	23 August 1672
Act in favors of James and Anna Duke and Dutches of Buccleugh and Monmouth for fairs at Dalkeith, Langholme and Cassiltoun.
Not public and general	1672 c. 29 —	23 August 1672
Act in favors of Sir Robert Murray of Abercairny for two yeirlie fairs and weiklie mercat at Wester Foulis &c.
Not public and general	1672 c. 30 —	23 August 1672
Act in favors of Alexander Earle of Eglington for ane yeirlie fair and weiklie mercat at the kirktoun of Eglishame.
Not public and general	1672 c. 31 —	23 August 1672
Act in favors of James Archbishop of Sainct Andrews for two yeirlie fairs at the toune and ferrie of Portencraig.
Not public and general	1672 c. 32 —	23 August 1672
Act in favors of Lord Neill Campbell for two yeirlie fairs at Clachan in Nethir Lorne.
Not public and general	1672 c. 33 —	23 August 1672
Act in favors of John Douglas of Maines for two yeirlie faires at the lands of Fergustoun dowglas.
Not public and general	1672 c. 34 —	23 August 1672
Act in favors of David Viscount of Stormont for two yeirlie faires and a weiklie mercat at Scone.
Not public and general	1672 c. 35 —	23 August 1672
Act in favors of David Viscount of Stormont for two yeirlie faires and a weekly mercat at Ruthvell.
Not public and general	1672 c. 36 —	23 August 1672
Act in favors of John Earle of Atholl for a yeirlie fair at the toune of Tillibarden.
Not public and general	1672 c. 37 —	23 August 1672
Act anent the dimission of the Burgh of Kilrinnie.
Not public and general	1672 c. 38 —	23 August 1672
Act anent the dimission of the Burgh of Anstruther wester.
Teind Commission Act 1672 (repealed)	1672 c. 39; 1672 c. 15	28 August 1672
Commission for plantation of Kirks and valuation of Teinds. (Repealed by Statute Law Revision (Scotland) Act 1964 (c. 80))
Courts Act 1672 still in force	1672 c. 40; 1672 c. 16	30 August 1672
Act concerning the Regulation of the Judicatories.
Conventicles Act 1672 (repealed)	1672 c. 41; 1672 c. 22	4 September 1672
Act against keipers of Conventicles, and withdrawers from publict worshipe. (Repealed by Confession of Faith Ratification Act 1690 (c. 7))
Correction Houses Act 1672 (repealed)	1672 c. 42; 1672 c. 18	4 September 1672
Act for establishing Correction-houses for Idle beggars and Vagabonds. (Repealed by Statute Law Revision (Scotland) Act 1906 (6 Edw. 7. c. 38))
Not public and general	1672 c. 43 —	4 September 1672
Act in favours of James and Anna Duke and Dutches of Buccleuch and Monmouth for uniting the fyve paroches in Eskdale to the Sheriffdome of Roxburgh.
Not public and general	1672 c. 44 —	4 September 1672
Act in favors of the Lord Forrester and Lady Jean Ruthven his spouse and Edward their sone anent the restitution of the Earle of Forth and Bramfoord.
Adjudications Act 1672 (repealed)	1672 c. 45; 1672 c. 19	6 September 1672
Act concerning Adjudications. Act concerning Adjudications. (Repealed by Bankruptcy and Diligence etc. (Scotland) Act 2007 (asp 3))
Vacant Stipends Act 1672 (repealed)	1672 c. 46; 1672 c. 20	10 September 1672
Act for imploying vacand Stipends for the Universities. Act for employing vacant Stipends for the Universities. (Repealed by Statute Law Revision (Scotland) Act 1906 (6 Edw. 7. c. 38))
Lyon King of Arms Act 1672 still in force	1672 c. 47; 1672 c. 21	10 September 1672
Act concerning the priviledges of the Office of Lyon King at Armes. Act concerning the priviledges of the Office of Lyon King at Arms.
Not public and general	1672 c. 48 —	10 September 1672
Ratification of the Mortification granted be William Earle of Dundonald in favors of the Colledge of Glasgow.
Not public and general	1672 c. 49 —	10 September 1672
Act in favors of William and Anna Duke and Dutches of Hamilton for repairing the kirk and manse of Borrowstouness.
Not public and general	1672 c. 50 —	10 September 1672
Act in favors of William Earle of Wigtoun for repairing and upholding the bridge of Kirkintulloch.
Not public and general	1672 c. 51 —	10 September 1672
Act in favors of John Earle of Atholl for repairing the kirk of Blair in Atholl.
Not public and general	1672 c. 52 —	10 September 1672
Act in favors of David Lindsay of Edzell for two yeirlie faires at the Milnetoun of Glenesk.
Not public and general	1672 c. 53 —	10 September 1672
Act in favors of John Gibsone of Durie for tuo yeirlie fairs at the burgh of barony of Leven.
Not public and general	1672 c. 54 —	10 September 1672
Act in favors of Robert Lord Newbottle for repairing and upholding the bridges of Newbottle.
Moratorium Act 1672 (repealed)	1672 c. 55 —	10 September 1672
Act Suspending publict Debts. Act Suspending public Debts. (Repealed by Statute Law Revision (Scotland) Act 1906 (6 Edw. 7. c. 38))
Not public and general	1672 c. 56 —	10 September 1672
Protection to William Dick grandchild and appearand aire to Sir William Dick.
Not public and general	1672 c. 57 —	10 September 1672
Act in favors of Sir James Baird of Auchmedden knight for tuo yeirlie fairs at the toun of Glencuthell.
Profaneness Act 1672 (repealed)	1672 c. 58; 1672 c. 22	11 September 1672
Act against Profaneness. Act against Profaneness. (Repealed by Statute Law Revision (Scotland) Act 1906 (6 Edw. 7. c. 38))
Not public and general	1672 c. 59 —	11 September 1672
Ratification in favors of Johne Earle of Rothes Lord high Chancellor, of his in feftments of the baronie of Cluny, Lugtoun &c.
Not public and general	1672 c. 60 —	11 September 1672
Ratification in favors of James Duke of Bucclewgh and Monmouth anent the title of Lord Dalkeith.
Not public and general	1672 c. 61 —	11 September 1672
Ratification in favors of John Earle of Atholl of the Earldom of Atholl &c.
Not public and general	1672 c. 62 —	11 September 1672
Ratification in favours of Sir John Wauchope of Niddrie of the lands and barony of Niddrie Marishall.
Not public and general	1672 c. 63 —	11 September 1672
Ratification in favors of M^{r} Alex_{r} Balnaves of Carnebaddie.
Not public and general	1672 c. 64 —	11 September 1672
Ratification in favors of Sir William Scot of Harden of the lands and barony of Mertoun.
Not public and general	1672 c. 65 —	11 September 1672
Ratification in favors of Charles Duke of Lennox and Richmond &c. of the office of Admiralty of Scotland.
Not public and general	1672 c. 66 —	11 September 1672
Ratification in favors of William and Anna Duke and Dutches of Hamilton of the lands and barony of Drumsargat.
Not public and general	1672 c. 67 —	11 September 1672
Ratification in favors of James Archbishop of Sainct Andrews of his right of pre senting the four Commissaries of Edinburgh.
Not public and general	1672 c. 68 —	11 September 1672
Ratification in favors of James Marquess of Montrose &c. of the lands and barony of Mugdock and others and of certain contracts betwixt him and the Commissioners of his Majesties Exchequer.
Not public and general	1672 c. 69 —	11 September 1672
Ratification in favors of John Earle of Glencairne of the lands of Antishill and others.
Not public and general	1672 c. 70 —	11 September 1672
Ratification in favors of John Earle of Cassills of the Earledome & Lordship of Cassills &c.
Not public and general	1672 c. 71 —	11 September 1672
Ratification in favors of Alexander Earle of Kellie of the lands & barrony of Kellie &c.
Not public and general	1672 c. 72 —	11 September 1672
Ratification in favors of William Earle of Kilmarnock of the Lordship of Kilmarnock &c.
Not public and general	1672 c. 73 —	11 September 1672
Ratification in favors of Charles Maitland of Haltoun Lord Thesaurer Depute of his infeftments.
Not public and general	1672 c. 74 —	11 September 1672
Ratification in favors of Sir Charles Erskine of Cambo and his sone of the office of Lyon herauld King of Armes.
Not public and general	1672 c. 75 —	11 September 1672
Ratification in favors of Sir Andrew Ker of Cavers of the lands & barony of Bedroull.
Not public and general	1672 c. 76 —	11 September 1672
Ratification in favors of James Hamilton Esquire in Monktounball.
Not public and general	1672 c. 77 —	11 September 1672
Ratification in favors of William Bruce of Newtoun of the lands of Newtoun &c.
Not public and general	1672 c. 78 —	11 September 1672
Ratification in favors of Adam Urquhart of Meldrum of the lands of Meldrum &c.
Not public and general	1672 c. 79 —	11 September 1672
Ratification in favors of Mr George Gibsone son of Sir John Gibsone of Pentland knight of the lands of Auchmoutie.
Not public and general	1672 c. 80 —	11 September 1672
Ratification in favors of M^{r} John Baine of Pitcairlie.
Not public and general	1672 c. 81 —	11 September 1672
Ratification in favors of M^{r} Thomas Murray advocat and his spous of the lands and barony of Glendook.
Not public and general	1672 c. 82 —	11 September 1672
Ratification in favors of the Colledge of Glasgow of the Subdeanrie of Glasgow.
Not public and general	1672 c. 83 —	11 September 1672
Ratification in favors of Major Hugh Bontein of the lands and barrony of Kilbryde.
Not public and general	1672 c. 84 —	11 September 1672
Ratification in favors of John Rutherfoord of Edgarstoun and his sone of the Lands and Lordship of Edgarstoun.
Not public and general	1672 c. 85 —	11 September 1672
Ratification in favors of Sir Andrew Ramsay of Abbotshall of the lands of Abbotshall &c.
Not public and general	1672 c. 86 —	11 September 1672
Ratification in favors of Sir Andrew Ramsay of Abbotshall of the Salt pans of Kirkcaldie.
Not public and general	1672 c. 87 —	11 September 1672
Ratification in favors of M_{r} Robert Ross of Invernethie of the Lands of Hilcarney.
Not public and general	1672 c. 88 —	11 September 1672
Ratification in favors of M^{r} William Barcklay minister at Forteviot.
Not public and general	1672 c. 89 —	11 September 1672
Ratification in favors of Andrew Fletcher of Saltoun of the lands and barony of Saltoun.
Not public and general	1672 c. 90 —	11 September 1672
Ratification in favors of Sir Thomas Stewart of Gairntullie of the Lands and Barrony of Gairntullie &c.
Not public and general	1672 c. 91 —	11 September 1672
Ratification in favors of Sir John Aytoun younger of that Ilke of the Lands and Barony of Aytoun.
Not public and general	1672 c. 92 —	11 September 1672
Ratification in favors of S^{r} James McGill son to David M^{c}Gill of Rankeillor nether of the lands of Nether Rankeillor.
Not public and general	1672 c. 93 —	11 September 1672
Ratification in favors of John Boyll of Kelburne of the lands of Craiglie &c.
Not public and general	1672 c. 94 —	11 September 1672
Ratification in favors of James Birsbane fiar of Rishoptoun of the ten merk land of Kelsoland.
Not public and general	1672 c. 95 —	11 September 1672
Ratification in favors of Johne Cuninghame of Enterkine of the lands of Previck &c.
Not public and general	1672 c. 96 —	11 September 1672
Ratification in favors of Sir Archibald Stewart of Blackhall knight of the lands and barony of Mearns &c.
Not public and general	1672 c. 97 —	11 September 1672
Ratification in favors of David Boiswell of Auchinleck of the Lands and Barony of Auchinleck.
Not public and general	1672 c. 98 —	11 September 1672
Ratification in favors of William Blair of that Ilke of the lands and barony of Blair.
Not public and general	1672 c. 99 —	11 September 1672
Ratification in favors of S^{r} Patrick Maxwell of Newwarke knight of the lands and barony of Newwark.
Not public and general	1672 c. 100 —	11 September 1672
Ratification in favors of Sir William Grahame of Gartmore and his sone of the lands and barony of Gartmore.
Not public and general	1672 c. 101 —	11 September 1672
Ratification in favors of M^{r} Rodger Hoge advocat and his spouse of the lands of Harcarse &c.
Not public and general	1672 c. 102 —	11 September 1672
Ratification in favors of M^{r} William Eccles of Kildonan of the lands and barony of Kildonan.
Not public and general	1672 c. 103 —	11 September 1672
Ratification in favors of Thomas Kirkpatricke of Closeburne of the lands and barony of Closeburne.
Not public and general	1672 c. 104 —	11 September 1672
Ratification in favors of John Johnstoun of Clauchrie of the lands of Nether Clauchrie &c.
Not public and general	1672 c. 105 —	11 September 1672
Ratification in favors of James Meinzies of Enoch of the lands and barony of Enoch.
Not public and general	1672 c. 106 —	11 September 1672
Ratification in favors of John Maitland of Eccles of the lands and barony of Eccles.
Not public and general	1672 c. 107 —	11 September 1672
Ratification in favors of Robert Griersone of Lagg of the lands and barrony of Lagg.
Not public and general	1672 c. 108 —	11 September 1672
Ratification in favors of David Kinneir of that Ilke of the lands and barony of Kinneir.
Not public and general	1672 c. 109 —	11 September 1672
Ratification in favors of Patrick Threipland Provost of Perth of the lands of Nethir Fingask &c,
Not public and general	1672 c. 110 —	11 September 1672
Ratification in favors of Patrick Maxwell son of Sir Patrick Maxwell of Newwark of the lands of Tealing &c.
Not public and general	1672 c. 111 —	11 September 1672
Ratification in favors of Sir David Carnegie of Pittarro of the lands of Drumlochtie.
Not public and general	1672 c. 112 —	11 September 1672
Ratification in favors of Sir William Bruce of Balcaskie of his Majesties letter of Exoneration.
Not public and general	1672 c. 113 —	11 September 1672
Ratification in favors of Sir William Bruce of Balcaskie of the lands of Drumeldrie &c.
Not public and general	1672 c. 114 —	11 September 1672
Ratification in favors of William Meinzies of Pitfoddells of the Lands and Barrony of Pitfoddells.
Not public and general	1672 c. 115 —	11 September 1672
Ratification in favors of Alexander Cochrane of Barbachlaw of the lands of Barbachlaw &c.
Not public and general	1672 c. 116 —	11 September 1672
Ratification in favors of Peter Hay of Naughtoun of the lands & barony of Naughton.
Not public and general	1672 c. 117 —	11 September 1672
Ratification in favors of Alexander Udny of that Ilke of the lands & barony of Udny.
Not public and general	1672 c. 118 —	11 September 1672
Ratification in favors of John Shaw of Sornebeg of the lands of Sornebeg &c.
Not public and general	1672 c. 119 —	11 September 1672
Ratification in favors of William Maxwell of Jacktoun of the lands and ba rony of Calderwood.
Not public and general	1672 c. 120 —	11 September 1672
Ratification in favors of Sir William Murray of Stenhope knight and Bar ronet of the lands and barony of Brughtoun.
Not public and general	1672 c. 121 —	11 September 1672
Ratification in favors of John Walker of Carronfoote Commissar of the Commissariot of Argyll.
Not public and general	1672 c. 122 —	11 September 1672
Ratification in favors of James Hamiltone younger merchant burges of Edinburgh of the lands of Hedderweek.
Not public and general	1672 c. 123 —	11 September 1672
Ratification in favors of James Maule of Melgound of the lands and barony of Melgound.
Not public and general	1672 c. 124 —	11 September 1672
Ratification in favors of Alexander Watsone Provest of Dundie of the lands of Wallace Craigie.
Not public and general	1672 c. 125 —	11 September 1672
Ratification in favors of the toune of Edinburgh of the Impost on Wines &c.
Not public and general	1672 c. 126 —	11 September 1672
Ratification in favors of Alexander Hamilton of Dalziell of the Lands and Barony of old Dalziell &c.
Glasgow Faculty Act 1672 Not public and general	1672 c. 127 —	11 September 1672
Ratification in favors of the Chirurgians Apothecaries and Barbors in Glasgow. Ratification in favour of the Surgeons, Apothecaries and Barbers in Glasgow.
Not public and general	1672 c. 128 —	11 September 1672
Ratification in favors of Sir James Baird of Auchmedden knight of the Lands and Barony of Auchmedden.
Not public and general	1672 c. 129 —	11 September 1672
Ratification of a Decreit arbitrall between the Merchants and Crafts of the burgh of Glasgow entituled The Letter of Gildrie Deacon Conveiner and Visitor of Maltmen and Meilmen.
Not public and general	1672 c. 130 —	11 September 1672
Ratification in favors of Sir James Johnstoun of Westirhall of the Lands of Daldurham.
Not public and general	1672 c. 131 —	11 September 1672
Ratification in favors of George Earle of Panmuire &c. of the fewferme duties of the lands and barronie of Barrie &c.
Not public and general	1672 c. 132 —	11 September 1672
Ratification in favors of Hugh Paterson of Bannockburne of the Lands and Barrony of Bannockburne.
Not public and general	1672 c. 133 —	11 September 1672
Ratification in favors of the Universitie of Sainct Andrews of their exemption from taxation &c.
Not public and general	1672 c. 134 —	11 September 1672
Ratification of his Majesties Gift of Mortification in favors of the Universitie of Sainct Andrews for maintaining of certain Masters and Professors there.
Not public and general	1672 c. 135 —	11 September 1672
Ratification in favors of Mr Andrew Burnet of Wariestoune of the lands of Wariestoune.
Not public and general	1672 c. 136 —	11 September 1672
Ratification in favors of Patrick Earle of Kinghorne of the lands barronie and Thanedome of Glammis &c.
Not public and general	1672 c. 137 —	11 September 1672
Ratification in favors of Sr John Young of Leny of the Lands of Lenies.
Not public and general	1672 c. 138 —	11 September 1672
Ratification in favours of Arthur Temple Chirurgion burges of Edinburgh of the toune and lands of Ravelrig &c.
Not public and general	1672 c. 139 —	11 September 1672
Ratification in favors of John Cheislie son of Walter Cheislie of Dalry of the Lands of Gorgie &c.
Not public and general	1672 c. 140 —	11 September 1672
Ratification in favors of Sr Hugh Campbell of Calder of the lands and barrony of Calder.
Not public and general	1672 c. 141 —	11 September 1672
Ratification in favors of John Blair of Dunskey of the lands of Killintringane &c.
Not public and general	1672 c. 142 —	11 September 1672
Ratification in favors of William Lindsay of Belstaine of the lands of Belstaine.
Not public and general	1672 c. 143 —	11 September 1672
Ratification in favors of John Leslie of Auquhorsk of the Lands of Auquhorsk &c.
Not public and general	1672 c. 144 —	11 September 1672
Ratification in favors of James Somervell of Drum of the lands of Gilmertoun.
Not public and general	1672 c. 145 —	11 September 1672
Ratification of an act of the Toun Council of Edinburgh & of ane act of the Baillies of the Canongate in favours of M^{r} David Watsone, anent the privilege of tradesmen working within the bounds of Sauchtoun.
Not public and general	1672 c. 146 —	11 September 1672
Ratification in favors of M^{r} David Watsone writer to his Majesties Signet and John Watsone his sone of the lands of Heardrig &c.
Not public and general	1672 c. 147 —	11 September 1672
Ratification in favors of Andrew Andersone Printer to the College and City of Edinburgh and his Co-Partners of the gift of sole and chieff Printer to his Majestie.
Saving the Rights Act 1672 Not public and general	1672 c. 148; 1672 c. 23	11 September 1672
Act Salvo Jure cujuslibet. Act Salvo Jure cujuslibet.
Adjournment Act 1672 (repealed)	1672 c. 149; 1672 c. 24	11 September 1672
Act of Adjournment. Act of Adjournment. (Repealed by Statute Law Revision (Scotland) Act 1906 (6 Edw. 7. c. 38))

=== Sources ===
- Alexander, William (1841). "Acta Parliamentorum Regis Caroli Secundi". An Abridgement of the Acts of the Parliaments of Scotland. Edinburgh: Adam and Charles Black. pp. A63 – A66 – via Google Books.
- Alexander, William (1841). "Acta Parliamentorum Regis Caroli Secundi". An Abridgement of the Acts of the Parliaments of Scotland. Edinburgh: Adam and Charles Black. pp. A63 – A66 – via Google Books.
- Chronological Table of the Statutes. London: Her Majesty's Stationery Office. 1972. pp. 1355–1356 – via Google Books.
- "Acts of the Old Scottish Parliament: 1672". legislation.gov.uk. The National Archives.
- "Index of Statutes: Index of Statutes: Charles II (1649-1685)". Records of the Parliaments of Scotland to 1707. University of St Andrews.

== See also ==
- List of legislation in the United Kingdom
- Records of the Parliaments of Scotland
