= SATA Air Açores Flight 530M =

Fatal aircraft crash in the Azores, 1999

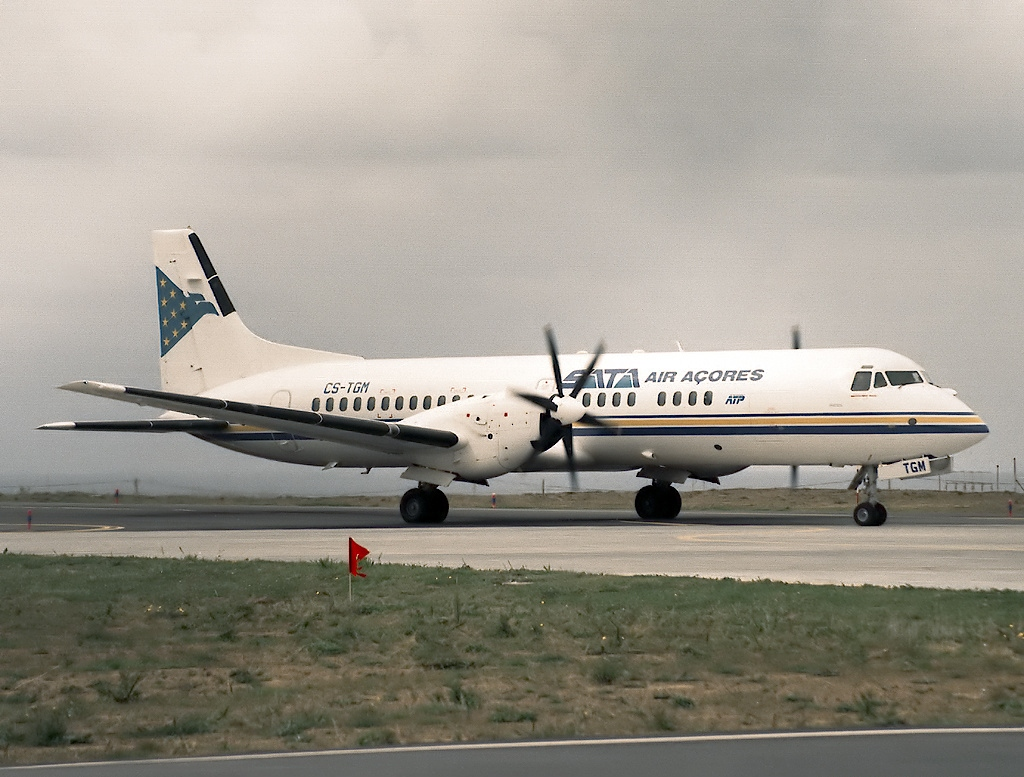
- CS-TGM, the aircraft involved in the accident in 1998

Accident
- Date: December 11, 1999
- Summary: Controlled flight into terrain (CFIT) due to pilot error
- Site: Pico da Esperança, São Jorge Island, Azores

Aircraft
- Aircraft type: BAe ATP
- Aircraft name: Graciosa
- Operator: SATA Air Açores
- Registration: CS-TGM
- Flight origin: João Paulo II Airport, Ponta Delgada
- Stopover: Horta Airport, Horta
- Destination: Flores Airport, Santa Cruz das Flores
- Occupants: 35
- Passengers: 31
- Crew: 4
- Fatalities: 35
- Survivors: 0

SATA Air Açores Flight 530M was a Portuguese regional commuter flight operated by SATA Air Açores that connected Ponta Delgada-João Paulo II Airport and Flores Airport, with an intermediary stop at Horta, on 11 December 1999. At 10:20 a.m., the British Aerospace BAe ATP, named Graciosa, while en route to Horta, collided with Pico da Esperança, on the central mountains of the island of São Jorge, resulting in the deaths of all 35 people on board. It is the deadliest aviation accident involving the British Aerospace ATP.

== Flight ==
On 11 December 1999, the British Aerospace ATP (CS-TGM) with 35 people aboard began flight SP530M from Ponta Delgada (on the island of São Miguel) to Horta (on the island of Faial, as part of the first leg of the wider Ponta Delgada to Flores flight). The flight departed at 9:37 a.m. from Ponta Delgada, with a planned flight level of 12,000 feet (3,700 m) and cruising speed of 260 knots, with an estimated 51 minutes flight time. The flight crew consisted of captain Arnaldo Mesquita (55) and first officer António Magalhães (46).

The meteorological information (submitted by the Meteorology Institute (Portuguese: Instituto de Meteorologia)) forecast between the hours of midnight and 6:00 a.m. in the islands of the Azores indicated a superficial cold front, with heavy clouds, moderate southwesterly winds changing to strong northerly winds, but generally weak in the central and western groups of the Azores. Wind strength for the itinerary ranged from 30 to 45 knots (56 to 83 km/h; 35 to 52 mph).

=== Accident ===
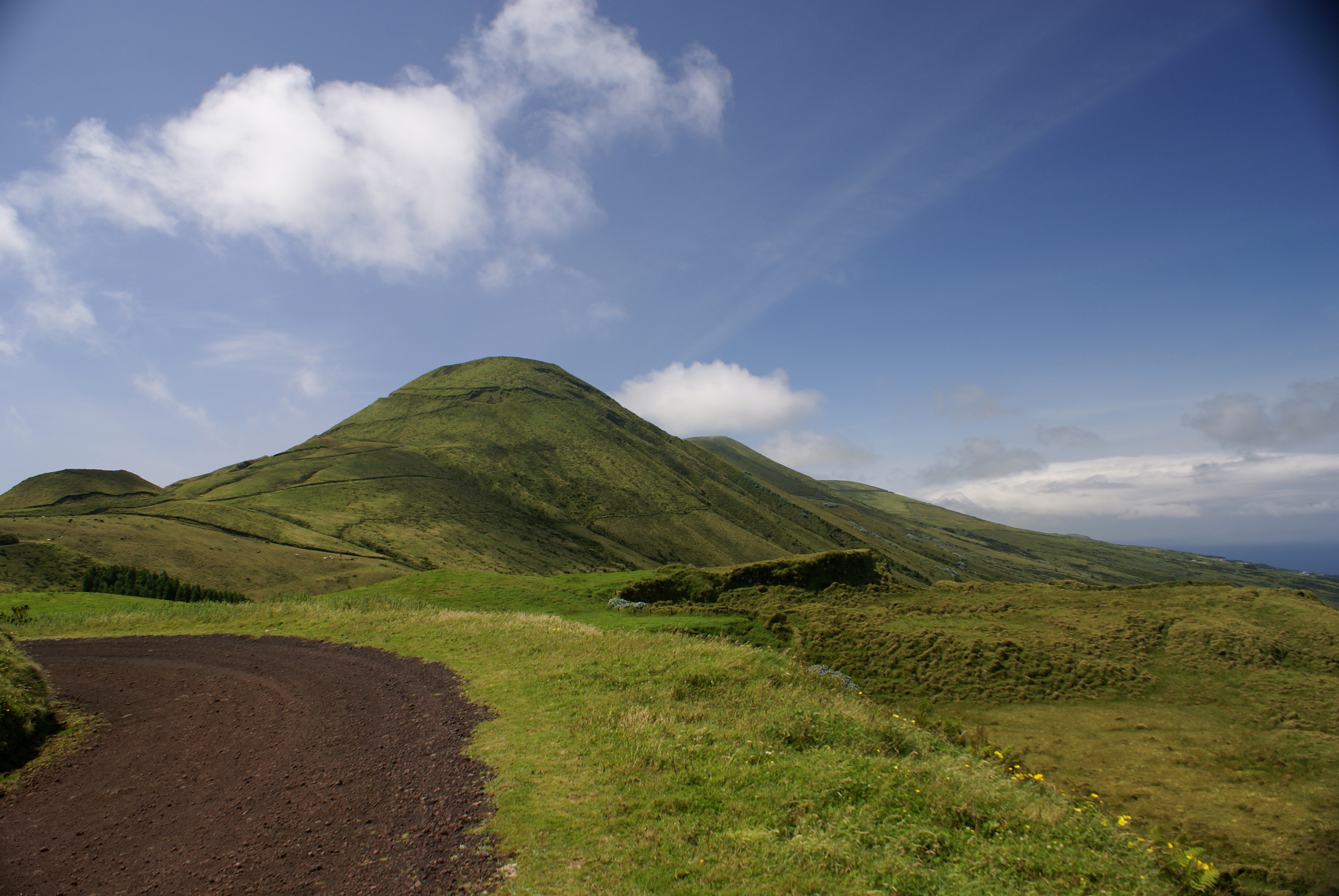
A view of the Pico da Esperança on the island of São Jorge where the fatal accident occurred

During the course, the crew decided to alter their flight plan, opting for a route that included approach descent over the channel between the islands of Pico and São Jorge, to intercept the 250 degree VOR/VFL Horta radial. Horta tower initially cleared the flight to FL100 (10,000 feet (3,000 m)), but the crew then requested (and were cleared) to descend to 5,000 feet (1,500 m) with instructions to maintain visual contact with the island of Pico.

At 10:03 a.m., the co-pilot had contacted the Santa Maria control tower to communicate that the flight was passing the LIMA-MIKE waypoint. The flight was planned for a route direct to Horta, but when the crew reported their position as LIMA-MIKE, the ATP had already drifted 14 nautical miles from its course; the crew did not indicate their awareness of the diversion. Approximately 43 nautical miles from Horta, the crew was authorized by the Horta tower to descend to 5,000 feet (1,500 m) and indicated their visual contact with Pico. During the descent, heavy rain and turbulence were encountered. The flight continued on its course as it descended, crossing the north coast of the island of São Jorge. But the crew had lost situational awareness and could not distinguish their barometric altitudes from the radio altimeter indicators.

The crew only realized that they were overflying the island from the verbal indication by the co-pilot and the final audible sound of the GPWS. Five seconds after the first alarm by the GPWS, the co-pilot reacted by pulling back on the throttles, and eight seconds following the alarm, the motors reacted. The plane began to recover its altitude and turned to the left. Seven minutes (10:17 a.m.) after initiating the descent, the left wing of the ATP impacted the northern hillside and eastern flank of Pico da Esperança and separated from the fuselage, at approximately 1,067 metres (3,501 ft) altitude on the island of São Jorge. The plane had continued its crash trajectory, rolling along a longitudinal path and inverting towards the sea before crashing. The GPWS alerted the crew 17 seconds before impact. No emergency call was received from the aircraft before it went down. There was no fire.

== Aftermath ==
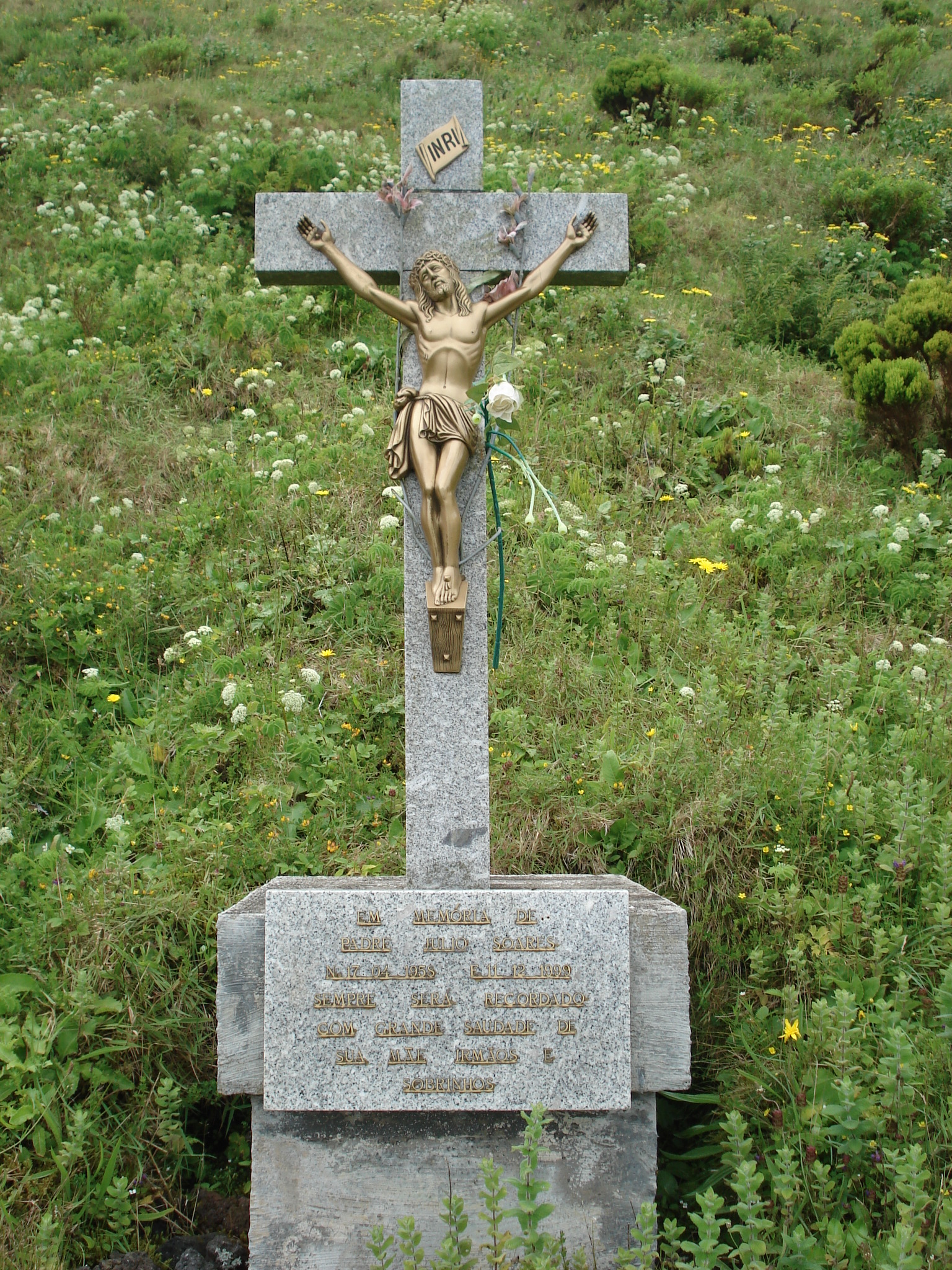
The memorial cross to Father Júlio Soares, parish priest, who died in the SATA Air Açores accident

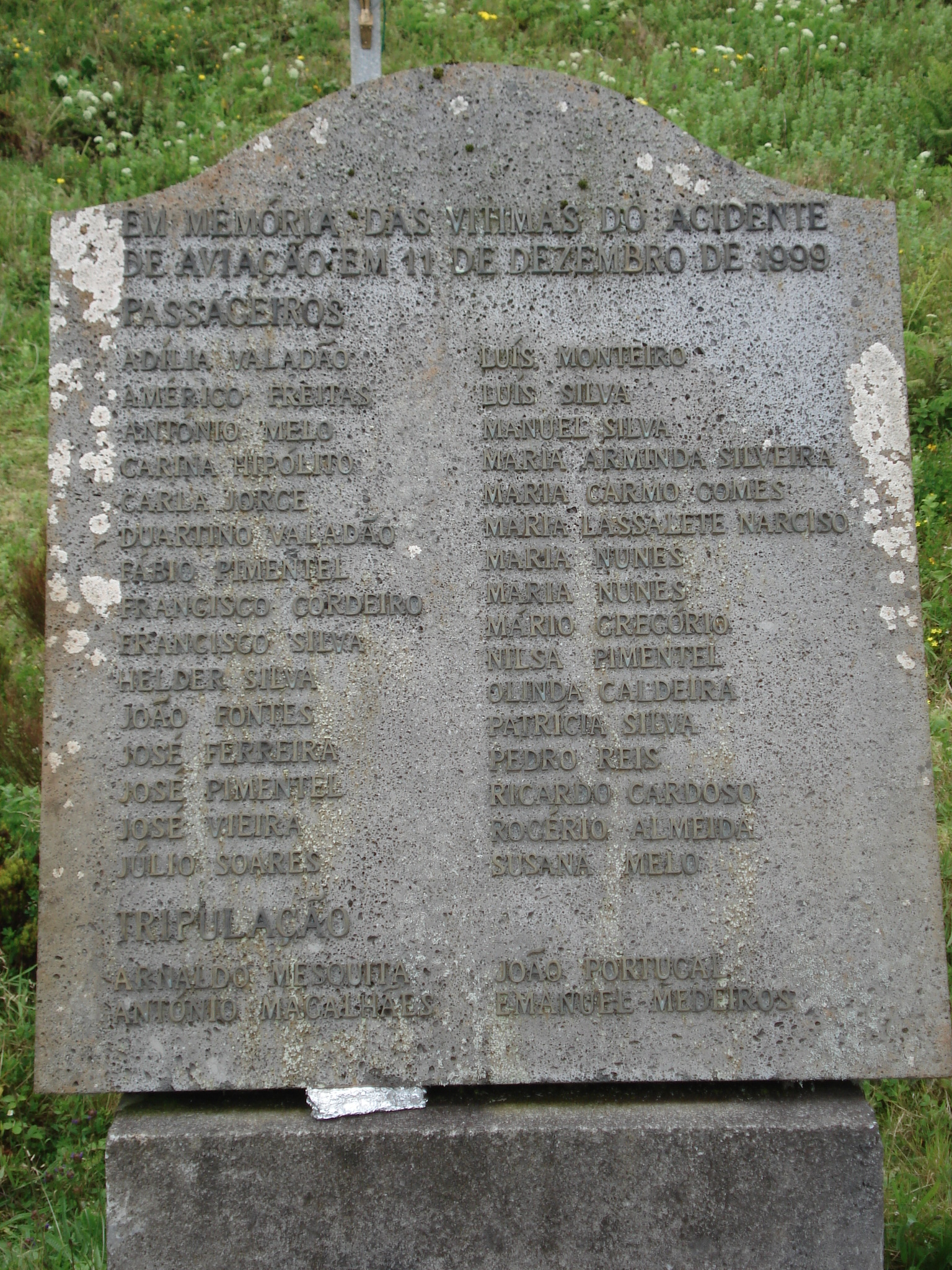
A memorial plaque with the names of the victims of Flight 530M located on the summit of Pico da Esperança

Rescue teams reached the wreckage more than four hours after the ATP crashed on São Jorge, where it scattered debris and victims across a dense ravine. The search was called off after dark, and only resumed on Sunday, when the investigation team was sent to the isolated crash site from the mainland. Seven bodies were recovered as rescuers using ropes and carrying stretchers, who scrambled over the steep mountainside before nightfall. Similarly, a thick mist shrouded the area, which was inaccessible to vehicles, making the search operation difficult.

Although the Portuguese Air Force helicopters were on standby to winch out any survivors, the time spent meant that the searchers were only there to "collect the bodies and examine the causes of the accident", since there was "no hope of finding survivors", from the comments of Internal Affairs Minister Fernando Gomes.

All SATA flights were canceled after the crash. Portuguese Prime Minister António Guterres, who was in Helsinki, Finland, for a European Union summit, cancelled a planned visit to Kosovo and headed straight for the Azores. SATA arranged flights to the islands for international relatives of crash victims.

== Report ==
The final report by the commission of inquiry by the National Institute of Civil Aviation (Portuguese: INAC Instituto Nacional de Aviação Civil) concluded that the flight had made a slight deviation from its route to Horta that was not perceptible by the flight crew. This deviation crossed the northern coast of the island of São Jorge, where it crashed into Pico de Esperança. The crew "was completely convinced" that the plane was over the São Jorge Channel, and they were concentrated on meteorological conditions at the time of the collision. After hearing their impact warning, three seconds before the first impact, the copilot alerted the crew that they were "losing altitude and over São Jorge". But, even as the pilots increased engine output, the maneuver was "insufficient to overcome the obstacle".

The conclusion of the report indicated that there was a lack of rigour in maintaining the prescribed safe altitude, inaccurate dead reckoning, lack of cross-checking the information of the radio altimeter and barometric altimeter, and improper use of airborne weather radar as an additional ease of navigation, all of which contributed to the disaster. The bad meteorological conditions on the day (which included clouds, moderate to heavy winds, with turbulence) and the lack of autonomous navigational aids aboard the aircraft (such as GPS), that could have determined their position, were also factors that contributed to the accident. In regards to the aircraft, the report determined that the ATP was operating within the navigational conditions correspondent to the regulations and approved procedures outlined by aeronautical authorities.

José Estima, a member of the directorate of the Portuguese Airline Pilots Association (Portuguese: APPLA Associação Portuguesa de Pilotos de Linha Aérea), stated that the factor that contributed to the accident of the SATA commuter was "a difficient [sic] quality and quantity of infrastructures to support aerial navigation". Referring to the credibility of the plane's pilot, APPLA indicated that the "pilot had flown for more than 20 years in the archipelago" and recorded that SATA pilots "are at the forefront, since they work in these adverse [local] conditions".

== See also ==
- Aviation in the Azores
