= Mistberget =

Mountain in Norway

Coordinates: 60°22′35″N 11°09′27″E

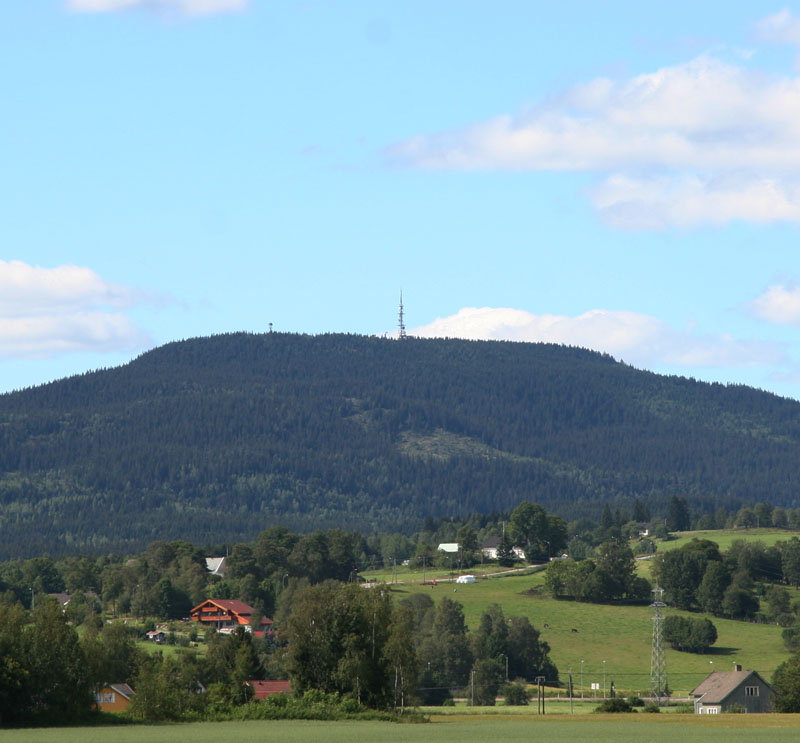

Geography
- Location: Akershus, Norway

Mistberget is a mountain in Akershus in southeastern Norway, and is visible from most places in Romerike. Near the top is a fire tower dating from 1938 and a TV transmitter mast.
