= Thomas Mullins, 1st Baron Ventry =

Anglo-Irish politician and peer (1736-1824)

Thomas Mullins, 1st Baron Ventry (25 October 1736 – 11 January 1824) was an Anglo-Irish politician and peer.

== Biography ==
Mullins was the son of William Mullins and Mary Rowan. His great-grandfather had settled in County Kerry in 1666, purchasing land at Burnham, near Dingle, and had served as a Member of the Irish House of Commons. Mullins was educated at Trinity College, Dublin, graduating in 1754.

He served as High Sheriff of Kerry in 1759, and in 1760 was made a member of the Privy Council of Ireland. In 1790 he built a new stately home for his family overlooking Dingle harbour, called Burnham Manor. On 18 June 1793, over 4,000 people marched in Dingle to protest against high rents and the establishment of a local militia. Mullins, who assumed responsibility for the town on behalf of the Crown, brought in 70 soldiers from Limerick to break up the demonstration. The riot was quelled when soldiers were ordered to shoot at the crowd, and 14 farmers were killed with many others being injured.

In 1795, Mullins bought Castle Conway from his relation, Harman Blennerhassett. On 7 December 1797, he was created a baronet, of Burnham in the County of Kerry, in the Baronetage of Ireland. He was further honoured when, on 31 July 1800, he was created Baron Ventry of Burnham, in the Peerage of Ireland. This was largely due to the help he and his son, William, had given to Lord Castlereagh in securing the passage of the Irish Act of Union of 1800. Mullins died in 1824, and was succeeded by his eldest son, William Townsend Mullins, 2nd Baron Ventry.

On 7 October 1755, Mullins married Elizabeth Gunn. They had twelve children:

- Hon. Theodora Mullins, married Edward Bruce, of Kilroot, in 1772
- Hon. Elizabeth Mullins, married Richard Blennerhasset in June 1780
- Hon. Arabella Mullins (d. December 1821), married Richard McGillycuddy of the Reeks in February 1780, childless
- Hon. Charlotte Mullins (d. 29 April 1816), married Richard Pierse Mahoney on 2 May 1792
- Hon. Catharine Mullins, married James Hozier on 28 December 1784
- William Townshend Mullins, 2nd Baron Ventry (1761–1827)
- Townshend Mullins (19 March 1763 – 1799), married Christabella Dayrolles and had one son, Thomas de Moleyns, 3rd Baron Ventry
- Lt-Col Hon. Thomas Mullins (d. 1823)
- Hon. Richard Mullins (1766–1850), married Miss Grey and left children
- Hon. Helena Jane Mullins (1773–1846), married Arthur Blennerhasset, son of Sir Rowland Blennerhassett, 1st Baronet, in September 1799
- Maj. Hon. Edward Mullins (1777–1841), married Elizabeth Hillyard in 1805 and left children
- Hon. Rev. Frederick Mullins (1778 – 30 December 1833), married Elizabeth Croker and left children

Peerage of Ireland
| New title | Baron Ventry; 1800–1824 | Succeeded by William Mullins |
Baronetage of Ireland
| New title | Baronet (of Burnham, Kerry); 1797–1824 | Succeeded by William Mullins |
