= Hijri Dede =

- Born: Mahmud ibn Ali ibn Naziri; 1881; Kirkuk, Ottoman Iraq
- Died: 11 December 1952 (aged 70–71); Kirkuk, Kingdom of Iraq
- Occupations: Poet and writer
- Years active: 1911-1952

Mahmud ibn Ali ibn Naziri, known by his pen name Hijri and his title Dede/Dade (1881 – 11 December 1952) was a kurdish poet and writer.

== Life ==
Dede was born in Kirkuk, where he grew up into a Kakaie family and was taught by them. He started working as a teacher in his hometown and in Baghdad. In 1927, Dede was assigned to manage Jaridat Al-Karkuk, after which he was appointed health inspector in the municipality department in 1928.

He wrote primarily in Turkish, Persian, and Kurdish. Dede worked in translation and history writing as well. He was usually quite secretive about his religious beliefs and practices, and when asked by outsiders, he would often claim to be Orthodox Sunni or sometimes, Twelver Shi'a.

Dede died on 11 December 1952 in Kirkuk, aged around 70 or 71.
