= Frederick Eveleigh-de-Moleyns, 5th Baron Ventry =

The Lord Ventry, DSO, DL.
- Born: 11 December 1861
- Died: 23 September 1923 (aged 61)
- Allegiance: United Kingdom
- Branch: British Army
- Service years: 1894–1901
- Rank: Lieutenant-Colonel
- Conflicts: Second Matabele War
- Awards: Companion of the Distinguished Service Order

Lieutenant-Colonel Frederick Rossmore Wauchope Eveleigh-de-Moleyns, 5th Baron Ventry, DSO DL (11 December 1861 – 23 September 1923), was a British Army officer and Anglo-Irish peer.

Ventry was the son of The 4th Baron Ventry and Harriet Wauchope. He was given the additional surname of Eveleigh when his father changed the family name in 1874. He was educated at Harrow School and the Royal Military College, Sandhurst.

He was commissioned into the 4th Queen's Own Hussars. He fought in the Second Matabele War between 1896 and 1897, being Mentioned in Dispatches twice. On 1 October 1896, he was redirected from the Matabele Campaign with Robert Baden-Powell to create the new police force in Mashonaland. He assembled and trained a force of 580 men by 1 December, 1896. On 7 May 1897 he was decorated as a Companion of the Distinguished Service Order. He was promoted to major in 1898 and retired as a lieutenant-colonel. Frederick officially retired from the military in the year 1901 at the age of 40. However, he was titled The Commissioner of Police in Mashonaland. He served as Deputy Lieutenant of County Kerry in the year 1902 during his residence in Burnham House, Dingle. Frederick succeeded to his father's title on 8 February 1914. He died unmarried and was succeeded by his nephew. His estate totalled £92 644 at the time of his death. In his will, he requested that £1 500 be left to his nurse, Miss M.L. Shelmerdene, provisions for John Gilbert de Moleyns, annuity to Edward Dayrolles, and the remainder to his brother Arthur William de Moleyns, the 6th Baron Ventry.

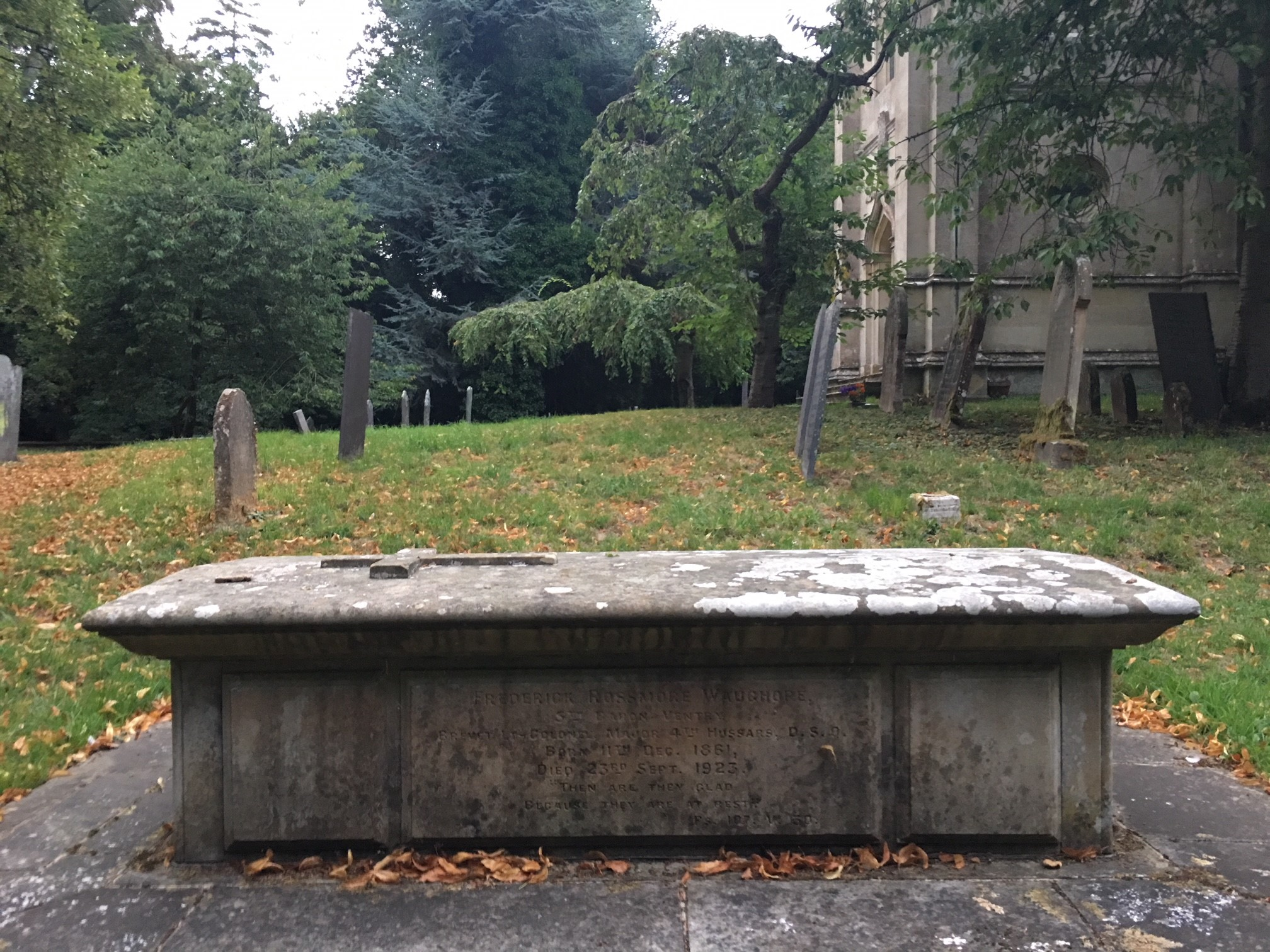
The grave of Frederick Eveleigh-de-Moleyns, 5th Baron Ventry, in the graveyard of St Mary Magdalene's Church, Stapleford

Peerage of Ireland
Preceded by Dayrolles Eveleigh-de-Moleyns	Baron Ventry; 1914–1923	Succeeded by Arthur Eveleigh-de-Moleyns
