= Baron of Niddrie Marischal =

Scottish noble title

Baron of Niddrie Marischal was a noble title within the Baronage of Scotland, historically tied to Niddrie, Edinburgh. It was created for Sir John Wauchope, father of John Wauchope, Lord Edmonstone, in 1632. It was subsequently ratified by the Parliament of Scotland in 1672.
