= Pico da Esperança =

Highest mountain of São Jorge Island, Azores, Portugal

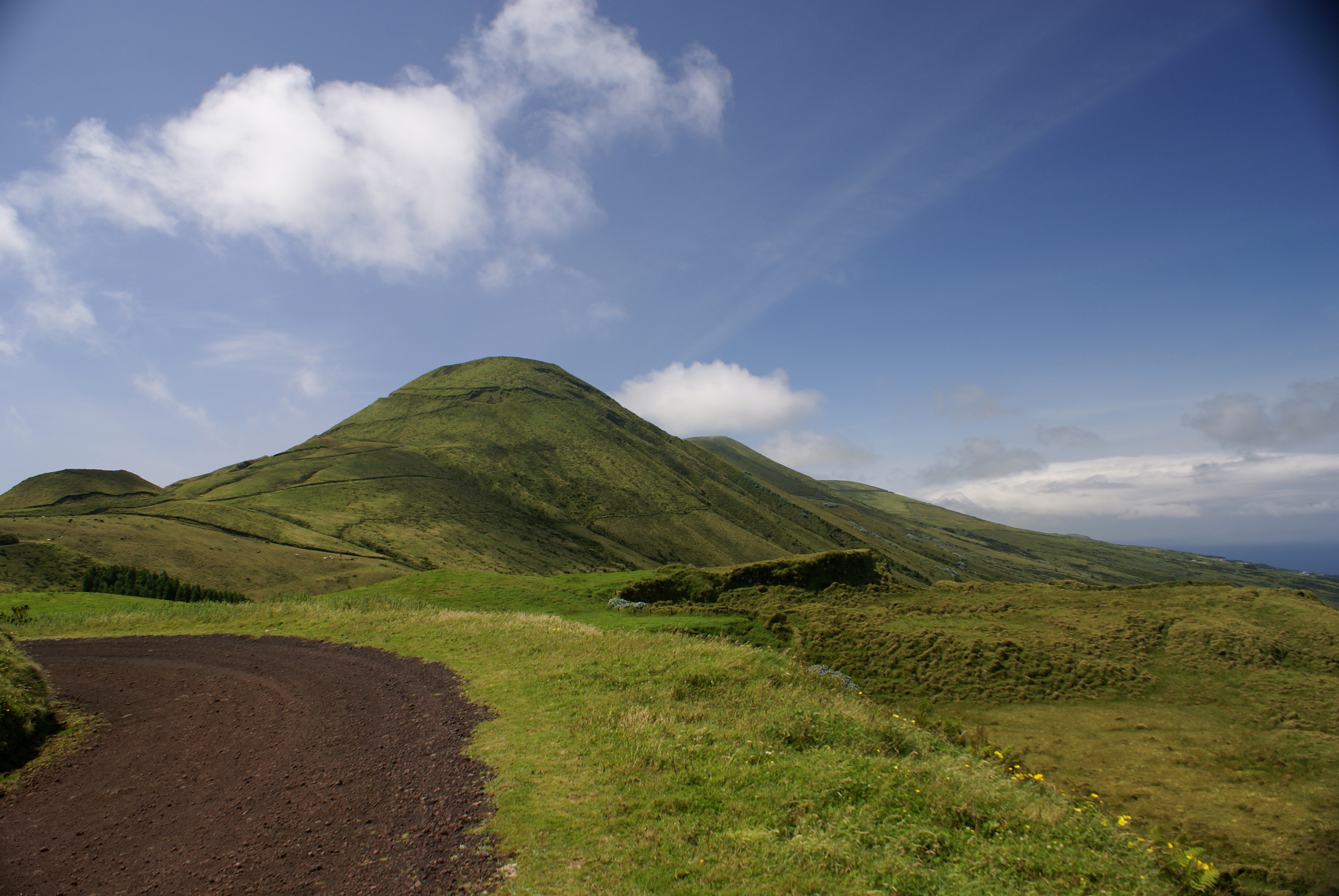
- Pico da Esperança, São Jorge Island

Highest point
- Elevation: 1,053 m (3,455 ft)
- Prominence: 1,053 m (3,455 ft)
- Parent peak: None - HP São Jorge
- Listing: Ribu
- Coordinates: 38°39′2″N 28°4′27″W

Geography
- Location within Azores
- Location: São Jorge Island, Azores, Portugal
- Parent range: Mid-Atlantic Ridge

Geology
- Mountain type: Fissure vents
- Last eruption: 1907

Pico da Esperança is the highest mountain of São Jorge Island, Azores. Its elevation is 1,053 m. It is situated in the Norte Grande parish, Velas municipality.
