= Thomas Mullins (British Army officer) =

British Army officer (??–1823)

Thomas Mullins (died 1823) was a British Army officer of the 44th Regiment of Foot, best known for his misconduct at the Battle of New Orleans during the War of 1812. While he performed well during the Chesapeake campaign, his failure to check on the regiment's engineering supplies at New Orleans played a key role in the disorganization and subsequent defeat of the British there.

== Birth and early career ==
Mullins was the third son of Thomas Mullins, 1st Baron Ventry and his second wife Christabella.

On 27 January 1791, he was promoted from Ensign of the 24th Regiment of Foot to become a lieutenant in the Independent Companies, and on 22 February 1791, he exchanged again from half-pay in the Independent Companies to the 45th Regiment of Foot. He was promoted to captain on 20 July 1794. He was appointed to the second battalion of the 44th when the second battalion was raised in Dublin in 1803. Subsequently, he transferred to the first battalion. In 1810, he married Parnell, the widow of Major-General Archer.

== Chesapeake campaign ==
When Colonel Arthur Brooke, lieutenant colonel of the 44th Regiment of Foot assumed the command of a brigade during the Chesapeake campaign, Mullins was breveted lieutenant-colonel and assumed command of that regiment. He was mentioned in despatches by General Robert Ross for his leadership at the Battle of Bladensburg, which took place on 24 August 1814. Mullins was also commended for his conduct during the Battle of North Point by Brooke, who succeeded Ross when the latter fell to a skirmisher's bullet.

== New Orleans campaign ==
During the New Orleans campaign, Brooke continued to command a brigade including the 44th during the initial landing, and Mullins retained command of that regiment.

The 44th was assigned by General Edward Pakenham to be the advance guard for the first column of attack on 8 January 1815, and to carry the ladders and fascines which would enable the British troops to cross the ditch and scale the American ramparts. Mullins was not pleased, viewing the regiment's role as that of a forlorn hope. Perhaps due to his bad temper, he failed to personally locate the ladders and fascines on the evening of the 7th, as Pakenham had ordered him to do. The officer he assigned to do so inquired about their location from an engineer officer, and reported they were in the advanced redoubt.

During the night, a battery was set up about 500 yards (460 m) forward of the advanced redoubt. Mullins, thinking this to be the location of the materiel, passed the advanced redoubt and halted the regiment at the battery. Upon discovering his mistake, he sent 300 men back to the redoubt at the double-quick to pick up the fascines and ladders, but it was too late. The other regiments were already advancing behind the 44th, the party of 300 lost formation as they struggled to reach the redoubt, and as day dawned, the attack commenced before the supplies could be brought forward.

The British column had already been disordered by the passage of the 300 returning to the redoubt, and they advanced into a storm of American fire. Without the fascines and ladders, they were unable to scale and storm the American position. Major-General Gibbs encouraged them with cries of "Here come the 44th!", while vowing, in an undertone, to hang Mullins on the highest tree in the swamp if he lived until tomorrow. It was to no avail. The British attacks on the east side of the Mississippi River failed in bloody confusion, with Pakenham and Gibbs among the casualties.

== Aftermath ==
Upon the return of the 44th to Dublin at the close of the campaign, Mullins was tried by a court-martial between 11 July 1815 and 1 August 1815, on the charges of having neglected orders to collect fascines and ladders, having allowed the regiment to pass the redoubt containing the fascines and ladders, and for having engaged in "scandalous conduct", in remarking to an officer of his regiment that the 44th was a "forlorn hope...and must be sacrificed" after receiving orders that the regiment should carry fascines. While he was acquitted of the latter charge, he was convicted of the first two and cashiered from the Army. He died in 1823, leaving no children.
