= Australian School of Pacific Administration =

Australian college

The Australian School of Pacific Administration (ASOPA) was a tertiary institution established by the Australian Government to train administrators and later school teachers to work in Papua New Guinea. It became the International Training Institute (ITI) in 1973 and provided management training for professionals from developing countries in the Pacific, Asia, Africa and the Caribbean. After a period as a base for consultants operating in the South Pacific for the Australian Development Assistance Bureau, it closed in late 1997.

== Beginnings ==
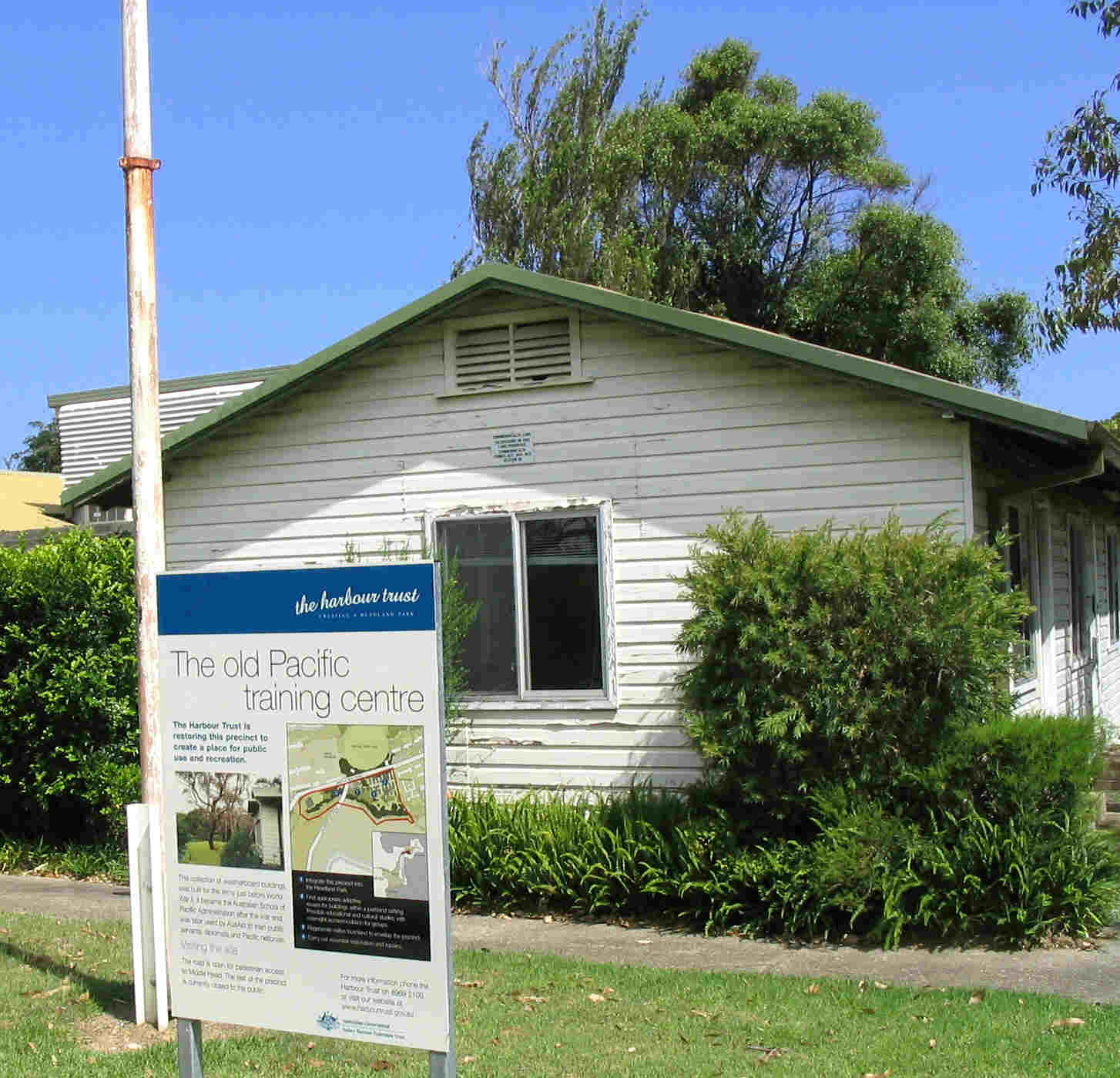
ASOPA 2004 - run down and awaiting restoration

In 1943, the Australian Army’s Colonel Alfred Conlon, who had previously chaired Prime Minister John Curtin's committee on national morale, was assigned to the staff of the Army's commander-in-chief, General Sir Thomas Blamey. Alf Conlon believed the Army needed a research section to tackle major strategic contingencies, such as what to do if Japan invaded Australia, and persuaded Blamey to establish a Directorate of Research and Civil Affairs. Blamey assigned Conlon to head the Directorate, which also provided policy advice on the governance of the Trust Territory of Papua and the Mandated Territory of New Guinea, then under Australian administration and the scene of fierce fighting between Allied and Japanese forces.

Established in his new role, Conlon assembled around him a group of talented Australian academics, among them John Kerr, James Plimsoll, James McAuley, Harold Stewart, Camilla Wedgwood, Ian Hogbin, Bill Stanner, Marie Reay and Ida Leeson.

By 1945, as World War II was drawing to a close, the School of Civil Affairs broadened its role to train officers for the Australian New Guinea Administrative Unit (ANGAU), responsible for civil administration in the Territories. At this time non-academic functions of Sydney University's Department of Anthropology - including providing training for cadet officers joining the New Guinea service and also more senior officials - were transferred to ASOPA.

Originally located at Royal Military College, Duntroon in Canberra, in March 1946 the School was transferred to civilian control and renamed the Australian School of Pacific Administration (ASOPA). Anne Robson had been working with the organisation for some time, and at this time she was appointed a fellow in Colonial Administration. In May 1947, the School was relocated to a group of Army huts on Middle Head in the Sydney suburb of Mosman. ASOPA operated under the Papua and New Guinea Act 1949 and was a responsibility of the Federal Minister for External Territories until 1 December 1973.

In 1946, John Kerr (later Sir John Kerr, Governor-General of Australia; Anne Robson became his second wife in 1975) was demobilised from the Australian Army with the rank of colonel and appointed the first Principal of ASOPA. The following year he also became the first Organising Secretary of the South Pacific Commission. He returned to the bar in 1948 to become one of Sydney's leading industrial lawyers. Conlon himself took over ASOPA and spent 1948 and 1949 as a reportedly unsuccessful and unhappy Principal of the institution.

== Operations ==
Immediately after the war, enrolments to study at ASOPA were restricted to servicemen and, when civilian candidates were admitted not long after, preference was given to those with working experience and good academic records. In the 27 years from 1946 to 1973, ASOPA trained approximately 1400 administrators for service in the Territory of Papua and New Guinea (TPNG), the Northern Territory and Nauru. After initially acquiring field experience in TPNG, Patrol Officers spent a year at ASOPA studying subjects such as law, map reading, history, government, Tok Pisin and anthropology. 30 of those who trained for Papua New Guinea service died in service there, the last in 1978.

In 1954, ASOPA began to train Australian teachers for service in TPNG to assist develop primary education. At the same time, courses were offered to teachers recruited for Special (Aboriginal) Schools in the Northern Territory of Australia. From 1956, teacher cadets were trained at distant Bathurst Teachers’ College in Bathurst. When the training course was eventually transferred to Middle Head in 1958, the trainee teachers were redesignated ‘Cadet Education Officers’ (CEOs). Approximately 900 CEOs trained for two years at ASOPA while about 700 went to TPNG where, after three years service, they qualified for the award of the New South Wales Teacher's Certificate.

In addition to training patrol and education officers, the School ran shorter orientation and refresher programs for Australian professional personnel preparing to serve in TPNG and elsewhere in the South Pacific.

By the mid-1960s, the Australian Government realised that Papua New Guinea would become independent sooner than previously anticipated and, under the Principalship of political scientist and author Charles Rowley, later Foundation Professor of Politics at the University of Papua New Guinea, ASOPA moved into an intensive period of training young Australians to accelerate the pace of development. Papua New Guinea eventually achieved nationhood on 16 September 1975.

In its final years, ASOPA introduced training for secondary teachers and more specialised administration courses. In 1970 there was a major change of focus as, with Papua New Guinea independence looming, the Australian Government turned to ASOPA to make good a serious shortage of trained indigenous administrators. The School enrolled up to 60 Papua New Guineans in ten-month management training courses. At the same time, the training of Australians was phased out. In these later years, ASOPA's work became more international. Although Papua New Guinea remained strongly represented, increasing numbers of students came from other developing countries in the Pacific and elsewhere.

== Later years ==
In 1973, the year in which Australia granted self-government to Papua New Guinea, ASOPA was redesignated and restructured as the International Training Institute (ITI) within the Australian Development Assistance Bureau, a division of the Department of Foreign Affairs. ITI provided management training for professionals from developing countries in the Pacific, Asia, Africa and the Caribbean.

A final restructuring – and change in name to Centre for Pacific Development and Training – saw the Middle Head campus used as a base for consultants operating in the South Pacific until this role came to an end late in 1997.

The history of ASOPA, and its successor institutions, paralleled the changing political milieu of the post-war and Cold War years. ASOPA began as a training institution for Australians taking leadership positions in Australia's territories. In its middle life, the School offered courses to people from developing countries. And, at the end, it provided a base for Australians consulting to the developing world.

At the end of World War II, confronting the first of many threats to the School's existence over the years, John Kerr wrote: “The idea was opposed, and opposed in influential quarters... We were determined that what had been created should not be destroyed. In this we succeeded.”

Today, the old Army huts on Middle Head are empty, but they have been heritage listed by the Commonwealth Government and now await refurbishment and regeneration into another role.

== Sources ==
- Campbell, I C (June 2000). "The ASOPA Controversy: a pivot of Australian policy for Papua and New Guinea, 1945-49". Journal of Pacific History. 35 (11). doi:10.1080/713682830. Archived from the original on 19 August 2006.
- Ciolek, T. M.; Noyce, John (eds.). "Acronyms Used by Asian/Pacific Studies' Scholars: a Dictionary". Research School of Pacific and Asian Studies (RSPAS), Australian National University.
- Bill Goff, ‘The End of a Unique Institution’, Focus vol 13 no 1, Australian Agency for International Development, March 1998
- "Pacific Studies WWW Monitor". RSPAS.
- "Fact Sheet 241 (John Robert Kerr)". National Archives of Australia. Archived from the original on 18 April 2007.
- Ritchie, John; Langmore, Diane (eds.). "Home page". Australian Dictionary of Biography. Research School of Social Sciences, Australian National University. Archived from the original on 3 January 2007.
- Cliff Turney and Judy Taylor, To Enlighten Them Our Task, Sydmac Academic Press, 1996
- UNESCO, Reports and Papers in the Social Sciences, Social Sciences in Asia IV, No 42, nd
