= ACDM =

ACDM may refer to:

- Airport Collaborative Decision Making, a standardized method for managing airport operations
- ASEAN Committee on Disaster Management (cf. Organisations associated with the Association of Southeast Asian Nations)
- Associação Cultural e Desportiva de Mindelo, a sports association
- Associação Cultural e Desportiva do Monte

== See also ==
- ΛCDM, Lambda-CDM model
