= Turney =

Turney may refer to:

== People ==
- Turney (surname)

== Other ==
- Turney, Missouri, village in Clinton County, Missouri, United States
- Turney Ranch Formation, a Mesozoic geologic formation, Dinosaur
- Turney, an alternative spelling of Torney, a former name for Turzyn, a neighbourhood in Szczecin, Poland
