= Organisations associated with ASEAN =

This is a list of organisations directly affiliated with the Association of Southeast Asian Nations, or ASEAN.

== Organisations under the jurisdiction of ASEAN ==
Organisation	Location	Link	Notes
ACCORD	Jakarta, Bangkok	http://www.accordplan.net/	ASEAN and China Cooperative Operations in Response to Dangerous Drugs
ASEAN–Australia Development Cooperation Programme	Jakarta	http://www.aadcp2.org/	AADCP
ASEAN Biodiaspora Virtual Center	Jakarta	https://asean-phe.org/phe-mechanism/asean-biodiaspora-virtual-centre-abvc/	ABVC
ASEAN Centre for Energy	Jakarta	http://www.aseanenergy.org/	
ASEAN Coordinating Centre for Humanitarian Assistance		https://ahacentre.org/	AHA Centre
ASEAN Connect		http://www.aseanconnect.gov.my/	
ASEAN Culture and Information Portal			
ASEAN Earthquake Information Centre		http://aeic.bmg.go.id/	AEIC
EC-ASEAN Green Independent Power Producers Network		http://www.ec-asean-greenippnetwork.net/	
ASEAN EU Programme for Regional Integration Support (APRIS) – Phase II	Jakarta		
ASEAN Food Safety Network	Bangkok	http://www.aseanfoodsafetynetwork.net/	ASEANFSN
ASEAN Football Federation		http://www.aseanfootball.org/	AFF; includes ASEAN futsal
ASEAN Forest Clearing House Mechanism			
ASEAN Foundation	Jakarta	http://www.aseanfoundation.org/	
ASEAN Action HazeOnline		http://haze.asean.org/	
ASEAN Interparliamentary Assembly	Jakarta	http://www.aipo.org/	AIPO/AIPA
ASEAN Law Association	Bangkok	http://www.aseanlawassociation.org/	ALA
ASEAN Legal Information Network System			LINKS
ASEAN Occupational Safety and Health Network		http://www.aseanoshnet.org/	ASEAN OSHNET managed at the Department of Labour Protection and Welfare, Ministry of Labour of Thailand
ASEAN ParaGames	Kuala Lumpur	http://www.aseanparasports.org/	
ASEAN Ports Association		https://web.archive.org/web/20130127084240/http://www.aseanports.com/	APAA
ASEAN Producers and Broadcasters		http://www.aseanmediadirectory.com/	
ASEAN Centre for Biodiversity		http://www.aseanbiodiversity.org/	
ASEAN-Japan Centre	Tokyo	http://www.asean.or.jp/	
ASEAN Regional Forum		http://www.aseanregionalforum.org/	
Asia Regional Trafficking in Persons Project	Bangkok	http://www.artipproject.org/01_aboutartip/index.html	ARTIP
ASEAN Science and Technology Network			
ASEAN Supporting Industry Database		http://www.asidnet.org/newportal/	
ASEAN Centre for Gifted Student in Science		http://www.acgs.or.kr	Associated with ASEAN+3 members. The Student camp and Teacher workshop usually in South Korea.
ASEAN Tourism		http://www.asean-tourism.com/ ; http://www.southeastasia.org/	
ASEAN University Network	Bangkok	http://www.aun-sec.org/	
ICT4D ASEAN Collaboratory	Jakarta	http://www.ict4dasean.org/	Information Communication Technology 4 Development
Information Centre on Emerging Infectious Diseases in the ASEAN Plus Three Countries		http://www.aseanplus3-eid.info/	
Southeast Asian Fisheries Development Centre		http://www.seafdec.org/cms/index.php	SEAFDEC
ASEAN-United States Enhanced Partnership Programme	Bangkok	http://www.asean-us-partnership.org/	
Youth@ASEAN	Singapore	http://www.aseanyouth.org/home.php	
ASEAN Bankers Association		http://www.aseanbankers.org/	
Asian Bonds Online		http://asianbondsonline.adb.org/	ABMI, an ASEAN+3 Initiative
Philip Kotler Centre for ASEAN Marketing		http://www.philipkotlercenter.com/	
US-ASEAN Business Council	Washington, D.C.	http://www.usasean.org/	
