= Peter Ryan (columnist) =

Australian writer (1923–2015)

Peter Ryan

Peter Allen Ryan MM (4 September 1923 – 13 December 2015) was a newspaper columnist, author, World War II spy, director of Melbourne University Press and an officer of the Victorian Supreme Court.

== Life and career ==
The son of the World War I veteran and VFL footballer Emmett Ryan, Peter Ryan was educated at Malvern Grammar School, near his home in Glen Iris in Melbourne's eastern suburbs. He left school at 16 to work in the Victorian public service, but as soon as he turned 18 he enlisted in the army to fight in World War II.

He served as an intelligence operative behind enemy lines in New Guinea for eighteen months, much of the time alone. He was awarded the Military Medal and mentioned in despatches. His 1959 book Fear Drive My Feet is his famous account of his experiences. On his return to Australia, he served under Alf Conlon at the Directorate of Research and Civil Affairs.

He studied at the University of Melbourne from 1946, graduating BA with honours. He married in 1947, and worked as a freelance writer, then in advertising, then as Public Relations Manager with ICI in Melbourne.

He was Director of Melbourne University Press from 1962 to 1989. He wrote about these years in his memoir Final Proof (2010).

In the September 1993 edition of Quadrant he wrote an attack on the six-volume History of Australia by Manning Clark, which Melbourne University Press had published between 1962 and 1987. Among other things he said Clark's history was "over a million printed English words, probably unrivalled in their power to combine the non sequitur with the anticlimax, and to wring the last drops from a series of foregone conclusions". The article aroused considerable controversy, which Ryan dealt with in a subsequent article in Quadrant in October 1994.

He wrote a monthly column for Quadrant from March 1994 to October 2015. A selection of these columns was published in 2011 under the title It Strikes Me. He died on 13 December 2015 at the age of 92.

== Bibliography ==
=== Books ===
- Ryan, Peter (1959). Fear Drive My Feet. Sydney: Angus and Robertson.
- — (1966). The Preparation of Manuscripts. Carlton: Melbourne University Press.
- —, ed. (1972). Encyclopaedia of Papua and New Guinea. Carlton: Melbourne University Press, in association with the University of Papua and New Guinea.
- — (1980). The Australian War Memorial. Canberra: Australian National University Press.
- — (1980). Redmond Barry: A Colonial Life, 1813–1880.
- — (1990). William Macmahon Ball: A Memoir.
- Black Bonanza: A Landslide of Gold (1991) (on the gold rush at Mount Kare in Papua New Guinea)
- Lines of Fire: Manning Clark & Other Writings (1997)
- Brief Lives: Biographical Glimpses of Ben Chifley, Paul Hasluck, A.D. Hope and Others (2004)
- Final Proof: Memoirs of a Publisher (2010)
- It Strikes Me: Essays by Peter Ryan 1994–2010 (2011)

=== "Ryan" columns in Quadrant ===
Title	Volume / Part	Date	Pages	Subject(s)
How we remembered	39/10	October 1995	87-88	50th anniversary of end of WW2
More valuable than a bonus	39/12	December 1995	87-88	Sir Thomas Playford
The unions	40/05	May 1996	87-88	

=== Book reviews ===
Date	Review article	Work(s) reviewed
1995	Ryan, Peter (December 1995). "The clear voice of hope". Books. Quadrant. 39 (12): 77.	Hasluck, Paul (1995). Light that time has made. Canberra: National Library of Australia.

=== Other articles and contributions ===
- Ryan, Peter (May 1996). "Discussing PNG rationally". Letters. Quadrant. 40 (5): 5–6.
- — (July–August 1996). "A Labor 'non-person'". Letters. Quadrant. 40 (7–8): 8.
