= Ernst Sarfert =

German ethnologist (1882–1937)

Ernst Gotthilf Sarfert (4 November 1882, Schönau near Zwickau – 19 November 1937, Leipzig) was a German ethnologist.

== Biography ==
He studied languages, history and geography at the Universities of Jena and Leipzig, and by way of influence from Karl Weule, he then devoted his time and energy towards the study of ethnology. In 1907 he became a volunteer at the Museum für Völkerkunde (Museum of Ethnography) in Leipzig, and during the following year received his doctorate with a thesis on natives of North America, titled Haus und Dorf bei den eingeborenen Nordamerikas.

From 1908 to 1910 he took part in the Südsee-Expedition (South Sea Expedition) to Melanesia and Micronesia aboard the research vessel Peiho. On the expedition he conducted extensive ethnological research on the atolls/islands of Sorol, Ifalik, Satawal, Puluwat and Kosrae.

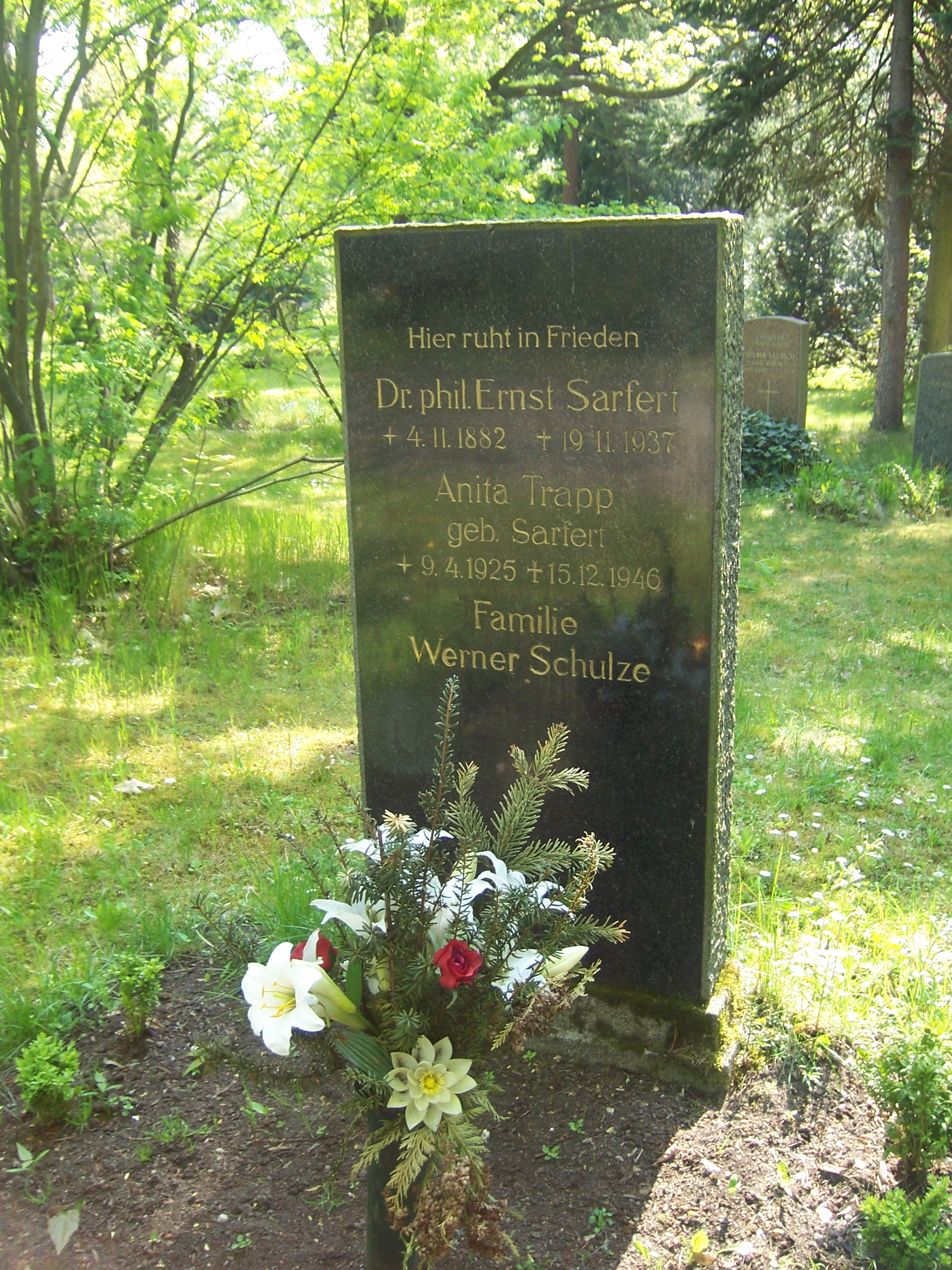
Gravesite of Ernst Sarfert at the Südfriedhof in Leipzig

After his return to Germany, he served as director of the Indonesian-Oceanic department at the Leipzig Museum of Ethnography. At the end of World War I he voluntarily left the museum, and later worked as an independent distributor of radios.

== Published works ==
- Haus und Dorf bei den eingeborenen Nordamerikas, 1908 – House and village among the natives of North America ..
- Zur Kenntnis der Schiffahrtskunde der Karoliner, 1911.
- Luangiua und Nukumanu nach den aufzeichungen, 1929 – Luangiua and Nukumanu Islands according to records.
- Kusae, 1919; later translated into English and published as "Kosrae" in 1983.
