= Lake Mainit Development Alliance =

Alliance overview
- Formed: March 1999
- Headquarters: Kitcharao, Agusan del Norte
- Employees: 3 PMO Personnel
- Alliance executive: Kaiser B. Recabo, Jr
- Website: http://lmda.wordpress.com

The Lake Mainit Development Alliance (LMDA) is an alliance of municipalities or local government units, government line agencies and civil society organizations in Lake Mainit area. Its significant role is to serve as the coordinating body of multi stakeholders in preserving and promoting Lake Mainit ecosystem.

== The Creation ==
Founded in March 1999, the Alliance was officially formed through a Memorandum of Agreement signed among the member local government units and government line agencies. The Regional Development Council recognized the Alliance per RDC Resolution Number 11 series of 1999.

Governor Francisco Matugas of Surigao del Norte province was the founding chairman of the Alliance in 1999. In 2001–2007 Governor Robert Lyndon S. Barbers of Surigao del Norte served as the chairman of board of trustees. Governor Erlpe John M. Amante of Agusan del Norte elected as the chairman of the board in 2007–2010.

== Alliance members ==
The members of LMDA includes the Province of Surigao del Norte, Province of Agusan del Norte, Municipalities of Alegria, Mainit, Tubod and Sison in Surigao del Norte, Municipalities of Kitcharao, Jabonga, Santiago and Tubay in Agusan del Norte. The regional government line agencies actively involved in the Alliance includes the National Economic Development Authority (NEDA), Department of Environment and Natural Resources (DENR), Department of Agriculture (DA), Bureau of Fisheries and Aquatic Resources (BFAR), Department of Tourism (DOT) and Philippine Information Agency (PIA).

Surigao del Norte LGUs	Agusan del Norte LGUs	Government Line Agencies
Province of Surigao del Norte	Province of Agusan del Norte	NEDA – 13
Municipality of Alegria	Municipality of Kitcharao	DENR – 13
Municipality of Mainit	Municipality of Jabonga	DA – 13
Municipality of Tubod	Municipality of Santiago	BFAR – 13
Municipality of Sison	Municipality of Tubay	PIA – 13
		DOT – 13

== Project Donors ==
The following are the project donors in the Lake Mainit cluster:

Funding Donors/Agencies	Project Areas & Type of Project
Philippines-Australia Community Assistance Program (PACAP)	8 Municipalities traversing Lake Mainit- Focal Community Assistance Scheme (FOCAS) and Responsive Activity Scheme (RAS) – environmental and livelihood related projects (Please see at the next page the list of PACAP projects)
Philippine Council for Aquatic & Marine Research & Development (PCAMRD) in partnership with Mindanao State University-Naawan	Lake Mainit Limnological & Water Quality Assessment and Lake wide- Rapid Appraisal (Lake Mainit Fisheries Resources Assessment Project Phase I)
Department of Agrarian Reform/International Fund for Agricultural Development-Northern Mindanao Community Initiative and Resource Management Project (DAR/IFAD-NMCIREMP)	Mainit, Alegria, Kitcharao, Jabonga and Santiago
Foundation for Philippine Environment with Caraga Consortium for Environmental Protection & Sustainable Development	Lake Mainit Bio-diversity Project
Voluntary Services Overseas	Lake Mainit Natural Resources Database
Cotabato-Agusan River Basin Development Project (CARBDP) with DPWH	Assessment of Lake Mainit for Flood Control Project
Instituto de Promoción y Apoyo al Desaeeollo (IPADE) in partnership with CONVERGENCE	Sustainable Rural Development Project – Program of Infrastructure & Promotion of Economic Sector in Rural Areas (SRDP-PIPESRA)

== Publication ==
Since 2006, LMDA started to published official newsletter "The Lake Mainit Chronicle". All published newsletter is posted online at LMDA Official Weblog site. The Program Management Office also published leaflets and other information-education campaign materials.
