= Directorate of Research and Civil Affairs =

The Directorate of Research and Civil Affairs (DORCA) was a mysterious and difficult-to-categorise think tank and possibly an intelligence organisation within the Australian Army during World War II.

Set up and headed by Alf Conlon, the Directorate's alumni had an influence over Australia and the Pacific region post-WWII, especially through the Australian School of Pacific Administration (ASOPA).

DORCA has been described as mysterious, odd ball, bohemian. It is difficult, if not impossible to categorise, having clearly involved at least in some sense in intelligence work. That it morphed into ASOPA after the war gives no real insight into its wartime activities.

When formed in February 1943, the Directorate was made part of Military Intelligence, with Conlon reporting directly to General Blamey, commander-in-chief of the Australian Military Forces. Some of the work achieved during its short, wartime life included: making good the shortfall of no adequate military maps for the Northern Territory; finding substitute sources for quinine when Australia’s quinine suppliers came under Japanese control; preparing reports on Army health and nutrition, battlefield terrain, dietary standards for Papuan carriers and trends in international relations., but its most important role was in developing policy advice on the post-war governance of Pacific territories after the anticipated allied victory. Conlon gave himself a broad policy canvas, which included anticipating and providing for PNG’s independence. "Work of enduring value was performed." However, DORCA's planning for post-war Borneo was duplicated and in conflict with other Australian War cabinet plans. The wartime involvement of DORCA in training people to be administrators in Papua New Guinea led directly to the advocacy for, and creation of, the Australian School of Pacific Administration (ASOPA) with John Kerr (Conlon's 2IC at DORCA) becoming its principal.

== Alumni ==
- Commander Alf Conlon
- 2IC John Kerr (later, 18th Governor-General of Australia)
- James McAuley
- Harold Stewart
- James Plimsoll (later, a Governor of Tasmania)
- Peter Ryan
- Bill Stanner (anthropologist) commander North Australia Observer Unit
- Camilla Wedgwood (anthropologist)
- Ida Leeson (Mitchell Librarian)
- Colonel J. K. Murray (Professor of Agriculture, University of Queensland 1927–1945, Administrator of Papua and New Guinea 1945–52)
- Professor Julius Stone, chair of international law and jurisprudence at Sydney
- Ian Hogbin (anthropologist)
