= Don Bosco Training Center =

Vocational institution in Comoro, Dili, East Timor

The Don Bosco Training Center is a vocational institution in Comoro on the outskirts of Dili, Timor-Leste. It is privately managed by the Salesians of Don Bosco. The institution has short courses in carpentry, electricity and welding, for students aged 17–35.

== History ==
When a dispute between the government and a group of 600 sacked soldiers erupted into violence on 28 April 2006, thousands of people immediately began fleeing their homes for the safety of the building of the institution.

In 2008 there were 170 students at Comoro, 40 of whom were girls. While most of the girls are learning word processing, there are three specialising in electrical wiring.

On February 11, 2010, the institution held a graduation in basic building skills of 106 previously unemployed young men. Most of these were school dropouts who used to spend their days sitting by the roadside. The basic building construction courses were in masonry, carpentry, electrical, metal fabrication (including welding) and plumbing. At the graduation they were presented with a certificate and personal box of tools.

The institution was initiated and largely financed by the South Australian Government's Austraining International and AusAID in partnership with Salesians in Timor-Leste, the Australian Salesian Mission Overseas Aid Fund and East Timor's SEFOPE – the government agency responsible for vocational training and employment.

Brother Adriano de Jesus was the principal of the technical school in 2010.

In 2016, the Centre offered Level 1 & 2 Certificates in General Construction including electricity, metal fabrication, carpentry, masonry, plumbing, automotive and office administration. The rector is Fr. Manuel Pinto.

In 2019, an accredited course in Rural Road Construction was introduced to offer further career opportunities.
