= Emmett Ryan =

Australian rules footballer

Personal information
- Full name: Emmett Francis Ryan
- Born: 6 August 1885; Adelaide, South Australia
- Died: 12 February 1937 (aged 51); Hawthorn, Victoria
- Original team: Footscray Juniors
- Height: 182 cm (6 ft 0 in)
- Weight: 76 kg (168 lb)

Playing career^{1}
Years	Club	Games (Goals)
1908	Richmond	12 (2)
1910–11	St Kilda	21 (0)
Total		33 (2)
- ^{1} Playing statistics correct to the end of 1911.

Emmett Francis "Ted" Ryan (6 August 1885 – 12 February 1937) was an Australian rules footballer who played with Richmond and St Kilda in the Victorian Football League (VFL).

A veteran of the New Guinea campaign in the First World War, he later worked for Vacuum Oil in Melbourne. He was the father of the soldier, publisher and writer Peter Ryan.
