= Nukumanu Islands =

Atoll in Papua New Guinea

Nukumanu
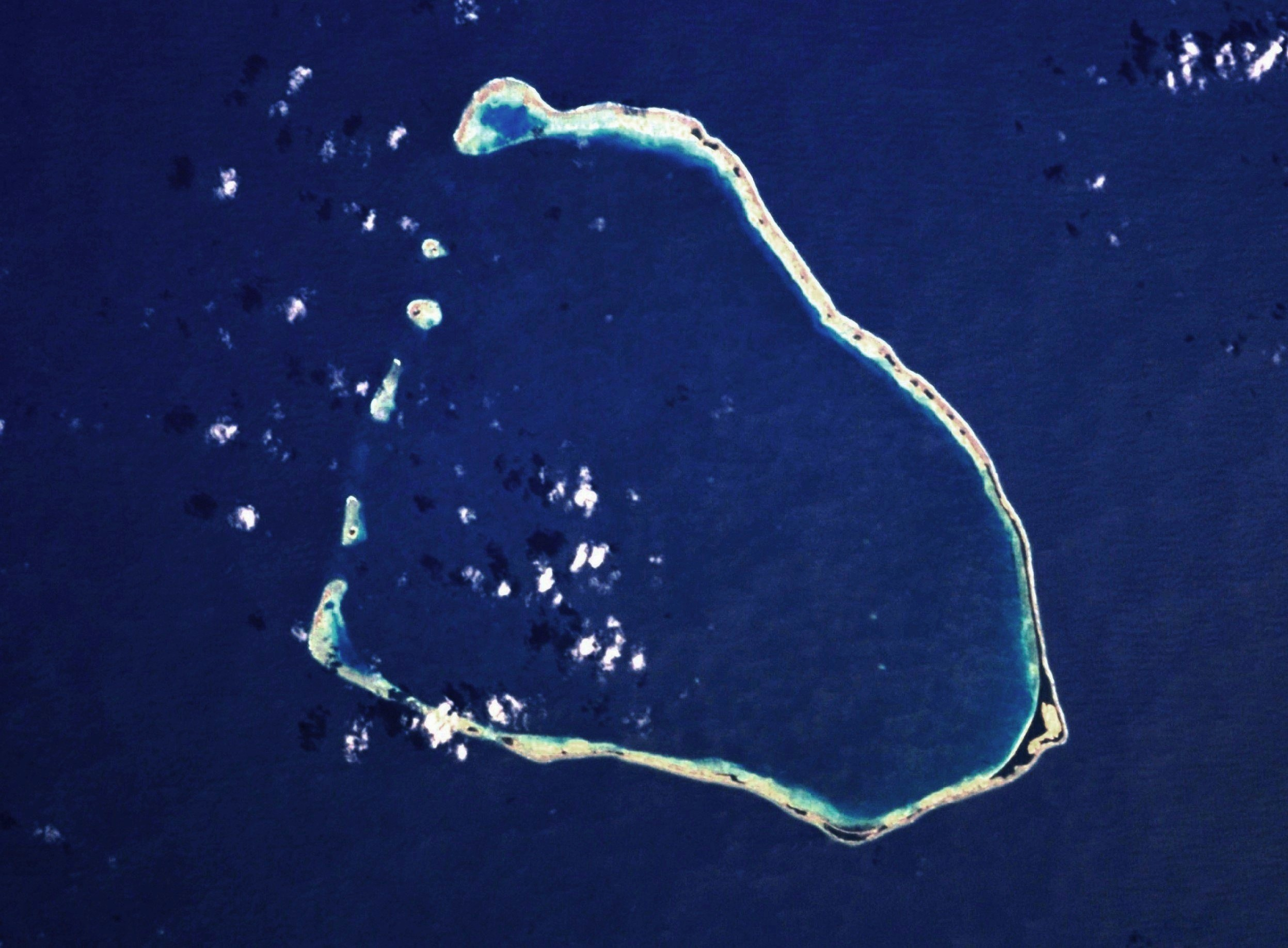
- NASA picture of Nukumanu Atoll

- Location within Papua New Guinea Location within Pacific Ocean

Geography
- Location: Pacific Ocean
- Coordinates: 4°31′S 159°24′E
- Archipelago: Group of three atolls
- Total islands: 22
- Area: 4.6 km^{2} (1.8 sq mi)
- Highest elevation: 2 m (7 ft)

Administration
- Papua New Guinea
- Autonomous Region: Bougainville
- District: North Bougainville
- Local-level government: Atolls Rural

Demographics
- Population: 730 (2000)

The Nukumanu Islands, formerly the Tasman Islands, is an atoll of Papua New Guinea, located in the south-western Pacific Ocean, 4 degrees south of the Equator.

== Description ==
Comprising a ring of more than twenty islets on a reef surrounding a large lagoon, Nukumanu's sandy islands are located on a strip of coral rising no more than 1 metre (3.3 ft) above sea level. The main inhabited islands of Nukumanu are located on the eastern end of the atoll.

Administratively Nukumanu is part of the Autonomous Region of Bougainville in Papua New Guinea, but it lies quite far away from the closest territory of Papua New Guinea proper, which is the coast of New Ireland island at 682 km (424 mi) to the west. The nearest land is Ontong Java Atoll, located only 38 km (24 mi) to the south of Nukumanu. The border between Papua New Guinea and Solomon Islands runs between these neighbouring atolls, which form a small geographic group together with the wholly submerged Roncador Reef at the southern end.

== History ==
In Polynesian history, the main cultural and commercial exchanges took place with the inhabitants of neighboring Ontong Java Atoll, with whom Nukumanu people share many cultural affinities.

Towards the end of the 19th century Nukumanu became part of the German colonial empire. It was captured by Australia in 1914 and formally transferred to Australian administration as a League of Nations mandate in 1920 by the Treaty of Versailles, after Germany's defeat in World War I.

In 1949 the Nukumanu Islands were included in the Territory of Papua and New Guinea when the Australian government merged the separate administrations of Papua and New Guinea. Papua New Guinea achieved full independence from Australia in 1975 and the Nukumanu Islands were incorporated into the new state.

Nukumanu's most recent claim to fame is that it was the last place on the path of Amelia Earhart before she and her co-pilot Fred Noonan disappeared forever into the vast Pacific Ocean. Their last known position report was near the Nukumanu Islands, about 800 miles (1,300 km) into the flight.

The land resources of the Nukumanu people are quite few and they grow a kind of taro and bananas. Coconuts are an integral part of the islanders' diet with the soft inside being a staple food and coconut flesh being consumed with raw fish and clams. They are also competent fishermen, who dive for bêche-de-mer in the lagoon. This is exported mainly to Asia, and along with trochus shells, used to make mother-of-pearl, they comprise the backbone of the Nukumanu economy.

== Anthropological studies ==
This atoll has a Polynesian population whose ancestors migrated westwards out of Polynesia. Their language is classified in the Samoic–Outlier branch of Polynesian. The Nukumanu Islands, together with neighboring Ontong Java retain a Polynesian character despite their location in the Melanesian Archipelago of Papua New Guinea and the Solomon Islands respectively.

The first serious research on Nukumanu's inhabitants was conducted by German ethnographers Ernst Sarfert and Hans Damm, during a German scientific expedition of the Southern Seas that took place in 1908–1910. This expedition visited both Nukumanu and neighboring Ontong Java Atoll, where they also carried out their research. Their work, "Luangiua und Nukumanu" was published in 1931.

== Bibliography ==
- Sarfert, Ernst, and Hans Damm. Luangiua und Nukumanu. Ergebnisse der Südsee Expedition, 1908–1910. Hamburg 1931, 2 vols.
