= Tornay (surname) =

Tornay is a surname. Notable people with the surname include:

- Balázs Tornay (born 1969), Hungarian alpine skier
- Cédric Tornay (1975–1998), Swiss lance corporal of the Swiss Guard and murderer
- Maurice Tornay (1910–1949), Swiss Catholic priest

== See also ==
- Turney (surname)
