= Harold Stewart =

Australian poet and oriental scholar (1916–1995)

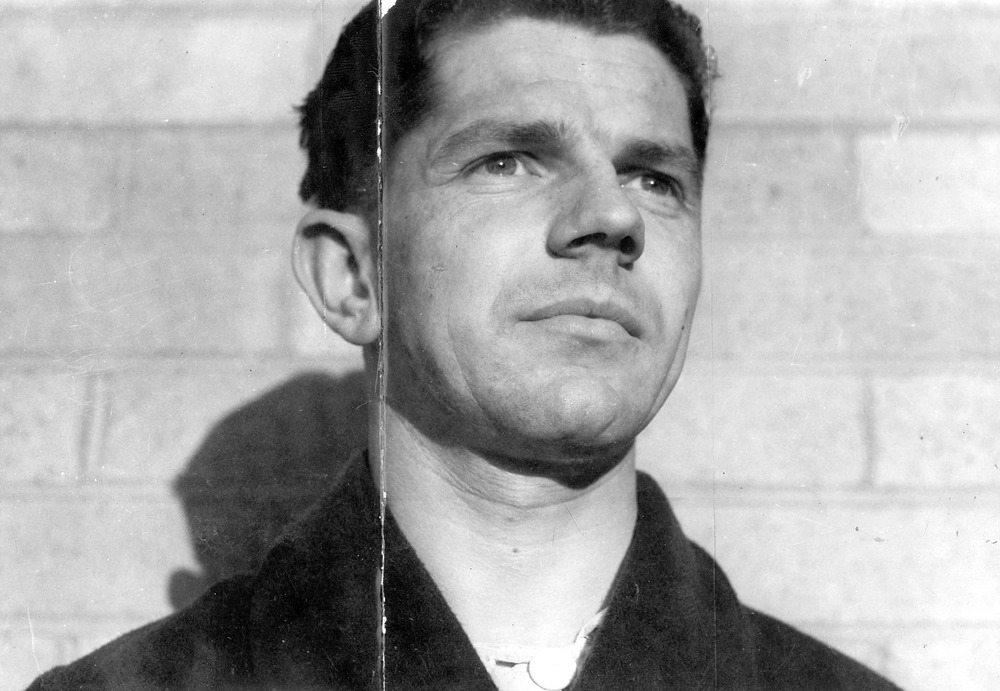
- Stewart around 1944
- Born: Harold Frederick Stewart; 14 December 1916; Drummoyne, New South Wales, Australia
- Died: 7 August 1995 (aged 78); Kyoto, Japan
- Occupations: Poet, scholar
- Known for: Ern Malley hoax

Harold Frederick Stewart (14 December 1916 – 7 August 1995) was an Australian poet and oriental scholar. He is chiefly remembered alongside fellow poet James McAuley as a co-creator of the Ern Malley literary hoax.

Stewart's work has been associated with McAuley and A. D. Hope, belonging to a neo-classical or Augustan movement in poetry, but his choice of subject matter is different in that he concentrates on writing long metaphysical narrative poems, combining Eastern subject matter with his own metaphysical journey to shape the narrative.

He is usually described by critics as a traditionalist and conservative but described himself as a conservative anarchist. A witty and engaging letter writer, many examples have been retained by the National Library in Canberra. Leonie Kramer in The Oxford History of Australian Literature grades the literary quality of Ethel's (Malley's supposed elder sister) letters as equal to those of Patrick White, Peter Porter and Barry Humphries.

== Early life in Sydney ==
Stewart was raised in Drummoyne, in the western suburbs of Sydney. He came from a comfortable middle-class background, and his father, employed as a health inspector, had a keen interest in Asia. Stewart displayed early promise as a poet after enrolling at Fort Street High School at the age of fifteen in 1932. Before attending Fort Street he studied the trumpet at the Sydney Conservatorium High School. A subtitle honouring Claude Debussy in 'Prelude: On the Quay,' written in the last year of high school, demonstrates that music was a formative poetic influence and one that provided a sense of organisation for his later poetry, which is most apparent in the fugue-like thematic structure of his spiritual autobiography By the Old Walls of Kyoto. The reference to Debussy also points to the significant influence the French Symbolists had on shaping the affective Gothic mood of his early poetry.

Fort Street was established in 1850 as an academically selective public high school reserved for intellectually gifted students. He got to know James McAuley at Fort Street and the budding poets shared a common interest in literature which provided the foundation for the exchange of ideas and the opportunity to develop a friendship. McAuley won the school Poetry Prize in 1933, while Stewart achieved the same honour in the two years that followed. In a letter to Michael Heyward, he writes: "Jim and I were not good friends at Fort Street, but rather rivals".

He had an early interest in French symbolists Stéphane Mallarmé and Paul Valéry and provided translations of their work in his first volume of poetry. He also favoured American modernists like Hart Crane and Wallace Stevens. Other major influences include the Romantics poets, especially William Wordsworth and John Keats. Carl Jung was an early metaphysical influence and it was by way of Jung's commentaries on oriental texts that he discovered the 'Traditionalist' school of writers. He also immersed himself in Chinese art and poetry, and this determined the subject matter of his first published collection, Phoenix Wings: Poems 1940-46 (1948). A later volume, Orpheus and Other Poems (1956), was strongly influenced by Jungian ideas.

== Bohemian poet ==
Stewart's enrolment in a teaching course at Sydney University was abandoned before his second year for the less certain but more enticing career of a poet. "I found the courses ... arid and boring to distraction," he recalls. His ambition to become a poet gathered momentum during high school and after completing his final year, and without university or full-time employment as a distraction, he embarked upon his chosen career path, spending many hours at the Sydney Public Library copying his favourite poems in long hand. In a letter to Michael Heyward, he wrote: "The period between leaving Sydney University and joining the Army was that period during which I worked through many modern influences, getting lost in the wilderness, stuck up blind alleys, and finding my way out of them".

This period served as an apprenticeship of sorts, suiting his introspective personality, though he did not abandon his social life completely and continued to gather with university friends in coffee shops and bars around Sydney to discuss literature and listen as they read their latest works. Despite his reserved social demeanour, and without the spur of alcohol as he rarely drank, he appeared forthcoming in conversation, though he had good reason to guard against revealing the more libertine details of his personal life. In a letter to Michael Heyward, Stewart discussed this social life: "... back in the later 1930's, I had met Alec Hope and he along with Jim [McAuley] and other literary friends used to meet on Saturday afternoons at Sherry's Coffee Shop in Pitt Street Sydney to discuss literary topics and improvise light verse, usually of a satirical nature".

While his former classmates engaged his intellect and wit, he had other friends entertaining more than just his mind. He refrained from publicly disclosing his homosexuality while alive. After his death Cassandra Pybus announced it in The Devil and James McAuley and Michael Ackland reiterated it in Damaged Men, though Sasha Soldatow was the first to publish the secret about Stewart's private life in 1996. Most of his friends were aware that Stewart made his way to the bohemian inner suburb of Kings Cross to discuss modern art, though, at the time, many were probably unaware that he also went there to pursue sexual relations with artists William Dobell and Donald Friend. Discretion about his sexuality was exercised after the final years of high school when accusations about his sexual orientation were made, forcing him to shelter his private life from scrutiny by developing a poetic persona as his public face. It is within this environment of intolerance that he had to appear as if poetry, not marriage and raising a family, was his main priority.

== The Ern Malley Affair ==
During the Second World War, he worked in Army Intelligence (DORCA) at the St Kilda Road Barracks in Melbourne. In 1943, while at the Army Barracks, he collaborated with James McAuley and invented Ern Malley, which aimed to expose the excesses of literary modernism. In The Ern Malley Affair, Michael Heyward recounts the events of the hoax when Stewart conspired with friend and fellow poet James McAuley to dupe Max Harris, the young leader of the modernist movement, and his fellow Angry Penguins, into believing that Ern's sister, Ethel, had found an unpublished manuscript while sorting through her brother's personal belongings after his premature death at the age of twenty-five from the usually non-fatal hyperthyroid condition known as Graves' disease.

The sad and unforgiving truth for Stewart is that Ern Malley not only haunted his career but also eclipsed his other poetry, though this should not be the manner in which his Buddhist poetry is remembered according to several critics. Heyward describes his poetry as "gorgeous, adjectival, multi-faceted like cut jewels, sculpted into tableaux and set pieces." H.M. Green describes Stewart as an accomplished verbal artist and an innovator in rhythm. In relation to his Buddhist poetry, Dorothy Green writes: ". . . the verse rises to a solemn incantatory splendour quite unparalleled in verse written by an Australian." A.D. Hope was the first critic to acknowledge Stewart's skill in marrying Eastern philosophies with the Western narrative form. He writes: This is not chinoiserie, it is not English poetry in Chinese fancy dress. It is English poetry which has enlarged its resources by an intellectual penetration of and an artistic comprehension of another culture. . . I am struck by the mastery, the justice and the originality of movement." Similarly, Kelvin Lancaster, in 1949, argues that even though Stewart appears derivative, excoriating him for adopting the "irresponsible style of Rimbaud," his poetry provides an original and distinct contribution to Australian poetry: "As it is, his brilliant style and versatile direction are a distinct contribution toward brightening the too often pallid and anaemic style of Australian poetry. With an originality of thought equal to his powers of expression, Mr Stewart could become the major Australian poet of the younger generation." Stewart was sixty-three years old and obviously excluded from claiming to be part the younger generation when his youthful promise belatedly reached its potential with the publication of By the Old Walls of Kyoto in 1981.

== The middle years - Melbourne ==
During the 1950s he worked at specialist bookshop in Melbourne, the Norman Robb Bookshop in Little Collins Street, and collected many of the Eastern books he would subsequently take to Japan. Many of these books are now currently for sale online after his nephew sold the collection. Noel Tovey in Little Black Bastard provides a brief portrait of Stewart when both men lived in Melbourne, though Tovey's chronology of events is dubious as he states Stewart had recently returned from Kyoto. Stewart's first visit to Japan, however, was in 1961 and not during the 1950s as Tovey states. Given Tovey would have been fifteen or sixteen at the time, it implies Stewart was a paedophile, which was never the case and demonstrates how dangerous it is for reputation when hazy memory parades as biographical fact. Peter Kelly's Buddha in A Bookshop does more justice to Stewart's legacy in both its accurate portrayal of him as a person and the chronology of events. At this stage he begins to move away from the Traditionalist writers he had been studying and increasingly pursues Japanese Buddhism and researching haiku. He published two haiku volumes in the 1960s, which, although popular and reprinted for nearly twenty years, have recently been subjected to some excellent technical analysis by Greg McLaren, who is one of the first academics to examine Stewart's poetry by way of a dissertation.

== Later life in Japan ==
"The Kavi"

There is One Poet only, who has sung
Through all the poet's songs in every tongue.
How rarely is that magic world disclosed
Where all His perfect poems are composed
Already, waiting for some poet's ear
To catch their wordless meaning, out of reach,
Before the moment's wonders disappear!
Yet verse attempts to sing that music here,
Vainly translated into human speech.

— Harold Stewart (1977)

He visited Japan in 1961 and then again in 1963 to be ordained as a Jōdo Shinshū priest only to withdraw at the last minute. It was rumoured he did not want to have his hair shaven. He returned to Australia and later enticed Masaaki, the Japanese man he had fallen in love with, to visit. Masaaki claims to have built the first Japanese-style garden in Australia in the Dandenongs. In 1966 he left Australia to live permanently in Japan. He devoted himself to studying the doctrines of Shin Buddhism to which he had converted. He became an expert on the history of Kyoto and was intimately acquainted with its temples, gardens, palaces and works of art. He became fascinated with Japanese poetry and published two translations of haiku: A Net of Fireflies (1960) and A Chime of Windbells (1969) which proved popular with the reading public.

His 1981 book By the Old Walls of Kyoto consists of twelve poems in rhyming couplets celebrating Kyoto's landmarks and antiquities, and Stewart's own spiritual pilgrimage into Buddhism. The poems are accompanied by a prose commentary.

He also devoted a great deal of time to collaborating with his teachers, Shojun Bando and Hisao Inagaki, in producing English versions of Japanese Buddhist classics such as the Three Pure Land Sutras and the Tannisho.

Stewart died in Kyoto on 7 August 1995 after a short illness. A Shin Buddhist ceremony was conducted for him. His body was cremated and his ashes scattered on his beloved Higashiyama mountains. He left a sum of money (about AU$250,000), some of which was intended to fund the publishing of his last long poem, Autumn Landscape Roll, but none of the money was used for this purpose. His sister was one of the executors of the will and inherited all the funds except for a separate benefice to his nephew from the above amount.

Stewart's high school poetry has homoerotic subject matter, making Stewart the first poet to embrace gay subject matter in Australia - although the closeted Stewart might have rejected being labelled Australia's first gay poet. In the 1950s he encrypted his poetry with personal homoerotic subject matter and also added other gay subject matter under the guise of Greek mythology. Stewart always remained discreet about his personal life except to his close personal friends, from whom he expected respect and secrecy.

== Bibliography ==
Poetry

- The Darkening Ecliptic Ern Malley (Harold Stewart with James McAuley, 1944) Melbourne: Angry Penguins literary journal; (2017 reprint) Los Angeles: Green Integer, ISBN 978-1-55713-439-4

Anthologies

- John Kinsella, Australian Poetry (Melbourne, Penguin, 2009), 'The Leaf-makers', pp. 183–184
- Before his death Stewart's poetry was anthologised in Australian Poetry 1943 (Sydney, Angus & Robertson, 1944), selected by H.M. Green, p. 25
- Modern Australian Poetry (Melbourne, Melbourne University Press, 1946, reprinted 1952) selected by H.M. Green, pp. 57–64
- Australian Poetry 1949-50 (Sydney, Angus & Robertson, 1951), selected by Rosemary Dobson, pp. 37–39
- An Anthology of Australian Verse (Sydney, Angus & Robertson, 1952), selected by George Mackaness, pp. 356–359
- Australian Poetry 1955 (Sydney, Angus & Robertson, 1955), selected by James McAuley, pp. 69–70
- Australian Poetry 1956 (Sydney, Angus & Robertson, 1956), selected by A.A. Philips, pp. 18–19
- Australian Poetry 1960 (Sydney, Angus & Robertson, 1960), selected by A.D. Hope, pp. 65–73
- Modern Australian Verse (Sydney, Angus & Robertson, 1964), selected by Douglas Stewart, pp. 129–132
- The Penguin Book of Australian Verse (Victoria, Penguin, 1972), edited by Harry Heseltine, pp. 265–266, which has Stewart's birth year incorrectly stated as 1913,
- Australian Voices: Poetry and Prose of the 1970s (Canberra, Australian National University Press, 1975), edited by Rosemary Dobson, p. 16
- The Golden Apples of the Sun: Twentieth Century Australian Poetry (Melbourne, Melbourne University Press, 1980, reprinted 1981), edited by Chris Wallace-Crabbe, pp. 98–106
- The New Oxford Book of Australian Verse (South Australia, Oxford University Press, 1986 and in the third edition a year after his death in 1996), selected by Les Murray, pp. 202–203
- Australian Poetry in The Twentieth Century (Melbourne, William Heinemann, 1991), edited by Robert Gray and Geoffrey Lehmann, pp. 170–175. When first published by H.M. Green in Australian Poetry 1943, the poem was titled 'The Leaf-Marker, though its title was subsequently altered in Phoenix Wings to 'The Leaf-maker' and then to 'The Leaf-makers' in Douglas Stewart's anthology. Kinsella's anthology adopts the same title.
- Leonie Kramer, The Oxford History of Australian Literature (Melbourne, Oxford University Press, 1981)
- Paul Kane, Australian Poetry
- H.M. Green, A History of Australian Literature (Sydney, Angus & Robertson, 1961)

About

- Damaged men: the precarious lives of James McAuley and Harold Stewart, by Michael Ackland, Allen & Unwin, 2001
- Buddha in a Bookshop, by Peter Kelly, self-published, 2007
