= Turney (surname) =

Turney is an Anglo-Norman surname, originally meaning from Tournai, Tornay or Tourny, all three of which are in Normandy, modern-day Belgium and France.

An early recorded Turney was Richard de Turney, named in the Hundred Rolls of Buckinghamshire, England in 1273.

== Notables of this name ==
- Cliff Turney (1932–2005), Australian academic
- Edwin Turney (1929–2008), American businessman
- Faye Turney, Royal Navy sailor
- Hopkins L. Turney (1797–1857), American politician
- Jacob Turney (1825–1891), American politician
- Peter Turney (1827–1903), American politician
- Norris Turney (1921–2001), American jazz flautist and saxophonist
- Joseph Turney (1825–1892), American politician
- Thomas Turney (1800–1887), English cricketer
- Chris Turney (born 1973), English professor

== See also ==
- Tornay (surname)
