= Dorothy Auchterlonie Green =

Australian writer and academic (1915–1991)

Dorothy Auchterlonie AO
- Born: 28 May 1915; Sunderland, County Durham, England
- Died: 21 February 1991 (aged 75); Canberra, ACT, Australia
- Other name: Dorothy Green
- Occupations: Journalist, academic, poet, author
- Spouse: Henry Mackenzie Green (m. 1944)

Dorothy Auchterlonie AO (also known as Dorothy Green; 28 May 1915 – 21 February 1991) was an English-born Australian academic, literary critic and poet.

== Life ==
Auchterlonie was born in Sunderland, County Durham in England. In 1927 when she was 12 years old, her family moved to Australia.

Educated in both England and Australia, Auchterlonie went on to study at the University of Sydney, where she completed a first-class honours and then an M.A. in English. During her time there Auchterlonie became a member of an elite group that included the brilliant and flamboyant poet James McAuley, Joan Fraser (who wrote under the pseudonym Amy Witting), Harold Stewart, Oliver Somerville, Alan Crawford and Ronald Dunlop. James McAuley and Harold Stewart were later to become notorious for perpetrating the Ern Malley hoax. The group was described by Peter Coleman in his book on James McAuley, as the 'sourly brilliant literary circle', an oblique reference to Thomas de Quincey.

In 1944, Auchterlonie married literary historian and critic, H. M. Green (1881–1962), who was then the Librarian at the University of Sydney. She worked as an ABC broadcaster and journalist in Sydney, Brisbane and Canberra from 1942 to 1949, and, in 1955, became co-principal of a Queensland school. In 1961, she became the first female lecturer at Monash University, lecturing in literature. Her teaching career included positions at both the Australian National University and the Australian Defence Force Academy.

During her academic career (1961–1987) she threw herself into championing Australian literature and publishing literary criticism to re establish authors she felt were undervalued, notably Martin Boyd, E. L. Grant Watson, Patrick White, 'Henry Handel Richardson', Christopher Brennan, Christina Stead and Kylie Tennant. In 1963, after publisher Angus & Robertson had approached her for an abridgement suitable for students, she began to revise her husband H. M. Green's massive History of Australian Literature, republished in two volumes in 1985. Her major study of Henry Handel Richardson, Ulysses Bound was published in 1973 and revised in 1986. In 1970, she began researching a major biography of writer and biologist E. L. Grant Watson, which led to the publication of Descent of Spirit in 1990, but at her death in 1991 the project remained uncompleted.

Along with supporting environmental causes and volunteer work for the Australian Council of Churches, she was prominent in campaigning with an ADFA colleague, David Headon, in speeches and writing against nuclear arms. She visited Moscow in 1987 as one of nine Australian delegates invited to a peace forum by the USSR Government.

In 1991, a collection of Auchterlonie's writings and papers was purchased by the National Library of Australia. Additional papers and documents are held in the Australian Defence Force Academy Library, Canberra.

== Recognition ==
Auchterlonie was awarded a Medal of the Order of Australia (OAM) in 1984 and was made an Officer of the Order of Australia (AO) in 1988 for her services to literature, teaching and writing.

== Bibliography ==
As Dorothy Green

- Fourteen Minutes (1950; with H. M. Green)
- H. M. Green's History of Australian Literature Vols 1 & 2 (revised by D.G.) Angus & Robertson, Australia 1984
- The Music of Love: critical essays on literature and life Penguin Books, Melbourne 1984
- Ulysses Bound: a study of Henry Handel Richardson and her fiction Allen & Unwin, Sydney 1986
- Imagining the Real: Australian Writing in the Nuclear Age (ed. with David Headon) ABC Enterprises, Sydney 1987
- Descent of Spirit: Writings of E.L. Grant Watson (ed.) Primavera Press, Sydney 1990
- The Writer, the Reader and the Critic in a Monoculture, Foundation for Australian Literary Studies 1986; Primavera Press, Sydney 1991

As Dorothy Auchterlonie:

- Kaleidoscope Viking Press, Sydney 1940
- The Dolphin ANU Press, Canberra 1967
- Something to Someone: Poems Brindabella Press, Canberra 1983

== Sources ==
- Fisher, Thea (1992). The poetry of Dorothy (Auchterlonie) Green. 10264798 (Australian Library Collections).
- MS 5678 Papers of Dorothy Green (1915–1991)
