= Australian Civilian Corps =

Australian Government sub-agency

The Australian Civilian Corps (ACC) is an Australian Government sub-agency that recruits and deploys civilian specialists to provide aid to developing nations in times of conflict or natural disasters. It is a component of AusAID (the Australian Agency for International Development) that was created in 2009 and operates to increase the effectiveness of Australia's overseas aid program by providing rapid response capabilities.

The ACC maintains a register of up to 500 civilians who have offered their particular skills and experience in a wide range of roles. These registered civilians can be engaged for rapid deployment to natural disaster zones and regions experiencing conflict to assist and coordinate disaster recovery efforts, where an official request for assistance has been received from the affected nation.

The ACC has sent deployments to South Sudan, Haiti and Afghanistan, supporting recovery and stabilisation programs. An ACC worker was seriously injured in a suicide attack in the Uruzgan province of Afghanistan in March 2012.
