= Roncador Reef =

Island in Solomon Islands

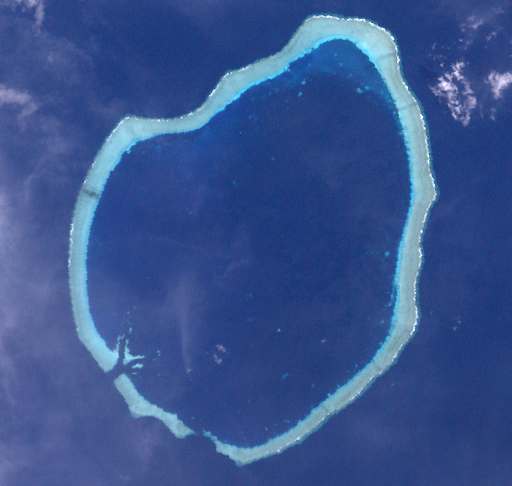
- Landsat image of Roncador Reef

- Location within Solomon Islands

Geography
- Location: South Pacific Ocean
- Coordinates: 6°13′S 159°22′E
- Total islands: Geographic group of three atolls

Administration
- Solomon Islands
- Province: Malaita

Roncador Reef is a reef in Solomon Islands, south of Ontong Java Atoll and north of Santa Isabel Island.

This submerged reef forms a small geographic group together with Nukumanu and Ontong Java, the two nearest atolls located further north.

== History ==
This reef was first sighted by Europeans at the time of the Spanish expedition of Álvaro de Mendaña and Pedro Sarmiento de Gamboa on 1 February 1558. It was charted as Bajos de la Candelaria (shoals of Our Lady of Candlemas in Spanish).

Its sighting was also reported by Spanish naval officer Francisco Mourelle de la Rúa on 22 January 1781 on board of frigate La Princesa. He charted this reef as Peregrino Roncador (Snoring Pilgrim in Spanish).
