= Ontong Java Atoll =

Group of islands in Solomon Islands

Ontong Java
Native name: Luangiua
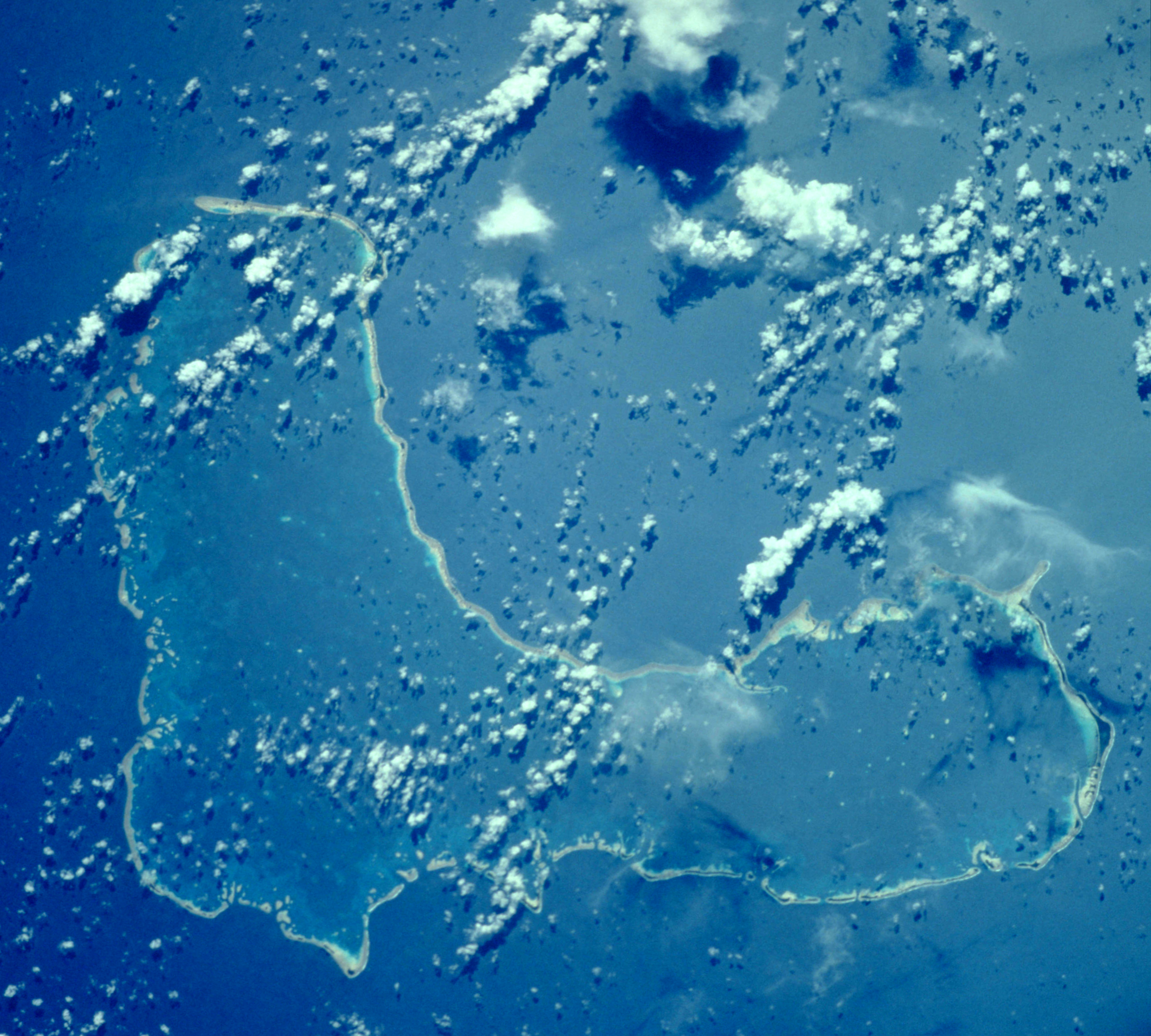
- NASA picture of Ontong Java Atoll

- Location within Solomon Islands Location within Pacific Ocean

Geography
- Location: Pacific Ocean
- Coordinates: 5°16′S 159°21′E
- Archipelago: Group of three atolls
- Total islands: 122
- Major islands: Luaniua and Pelau
- Area: 1,500 km^{2} (580 sq mi)
- Highest elevation: 13 m (43 ft)

Administration
- Solomon Islands
- Province: Malaita
- Largest settlement: Luaniua (pop. 1,386)

Demographics
- Population: 2,085 (2006)
- Ethnic groups: Polynesian 100%

Ontong Java Atoll or Luangiua (formerly Lord Howe Atoll, not to be confused with Lord Howe Island) is an atoll in Solomon Islands, and one of the largest atolls on earth.

It is inhabited by a Polynesian community of about 2,400 people, who speak the Ontong Java language.

== Description ==
Geographically, Ontong Java belongs to a scattered group of three atolls which includes nearby Nukumanu Atoll and the wholly submerged Roncador Reef located 75 kilometres (47 miles) to the south.

Administratively Ontong Java belongs to Solomon Islands. As an outlying part of Malaita Province, it forms the northernmost tract of land of this state, over 250 km (160 mi) north of Santa Isabel Island. The closest land, however, is Nukumanu Atoll, which lies only 38 km (24 mi) due north of Ontong Java's northern tip and, though historically closely related to Ontong Java, is now under the administration of Papua New Guinea.

Ontong Java is roughly boot-shaped. The entire size of the atoll is 1,400 km^{2} (540 sq mi), but there are only 12 km^{2} (4.6 sq mi) of land, spread out over 122 small islands. The islands are mostly low-lying coral formations, the highest elevation being 13 m (43 ft).

Approximately 2000 people live on the atoll. There are two main villages where the population is concentrated with 1,386 on the island of Luaniua in the eastern end and 689 on Pelau in the northeast.

== History ==
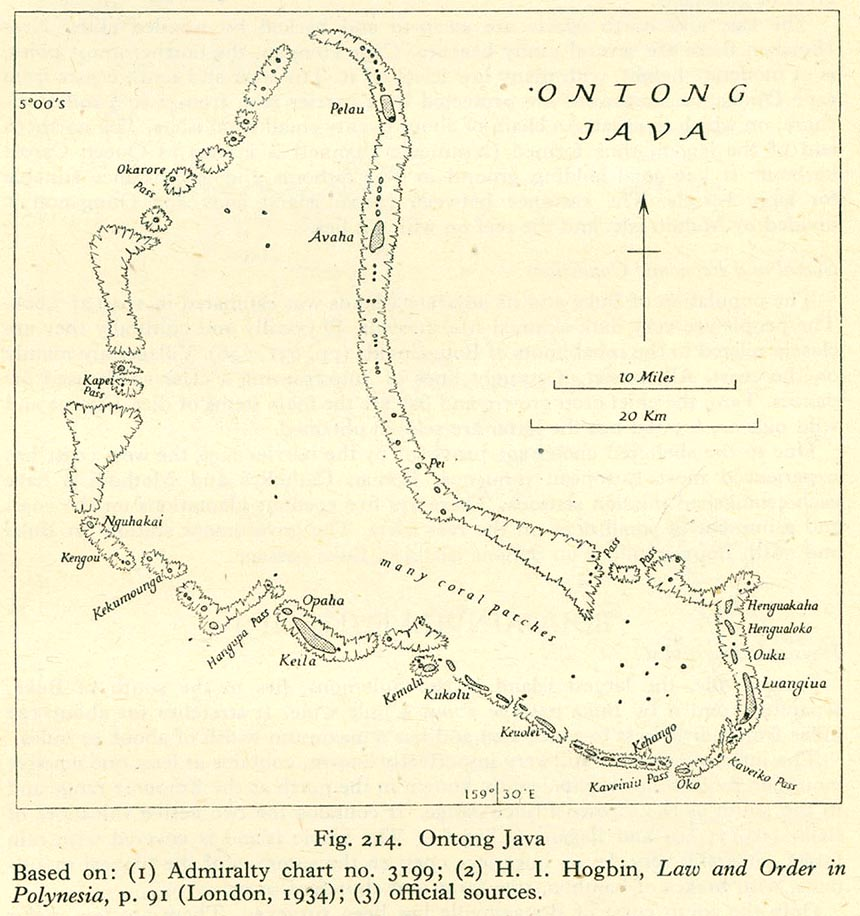
Nautical Chart of Ontong Java Atoll, 1934

The islands were first inhabited by Polynesians approximately 2000 years ago. The main cultural and commercial exchanges took place with the inhabitants of neighboring Nukumanu Atoll, with whom Ontong Java people share many cultural affinities.

It is likely that the first European sighting was by the Spanish expedition of Álvaro de Mendaña on 1 February 1568. It was charted by them as Bajos de la Candelaria (shoals of Our Lady of Candlemas in Spanish). The following verifiable sighting by Europeans was by Abel Tasman in 1643 who named it Ontong Java; however, it was not until 1791 that Europeans set foot on the islands, when Capt. John Hunter (later Governor of New South Wales) named it Lord Howe Atoll. In 1893 the islands were annexed by Germany and ceded to Great Britain in 1899.

Today the atoll's inhabitants make a subsistence living by means of coconut and taro (root) cultivation, as well as fishing. Until a ban in 2005, the primary source of income was beche de mer and trochus shells, which were shipped to Hong Kong. The inhabitants are also involved in copra production. It also has a prolific number of sea birds, including the black-naped tern, which uses Ontong Java Atoll as a breeding site.

== Anthropology and linguistics ==
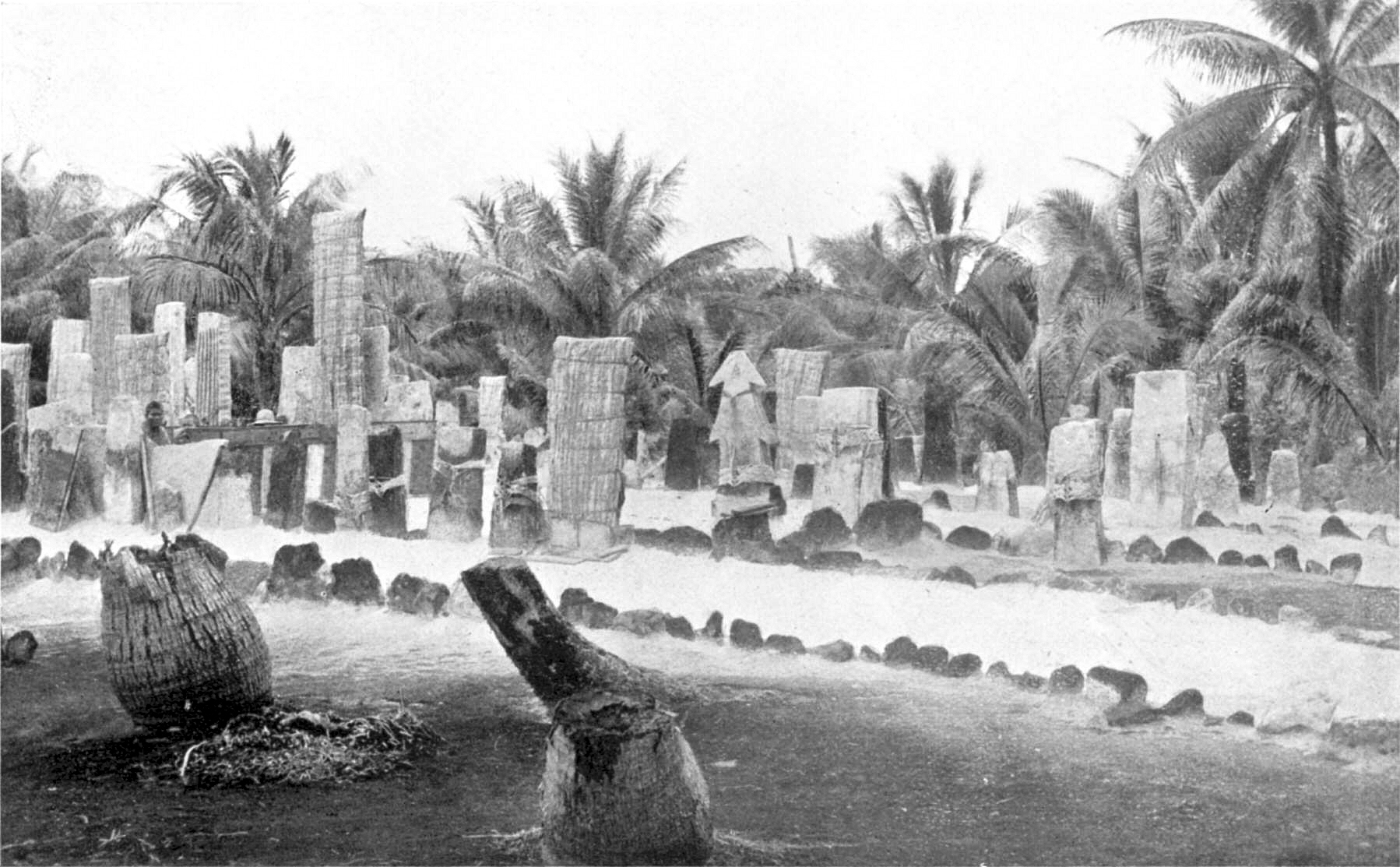
Large general cemetery, Luaniua, Ontong Java. Picture by George Brown (missionary) (1835 – 1917).

Ontong Java is a Polynesian outlier. The inhabitants retain a Polynesian character despite their location in the Melanesian Archipelago of Solomon Islands. In former times both men and women wore elaborate tattoos all over their bodies. Two dialects of one language are spoken in this atoll, Luangiua and Pelau. This language belongs to the Polynesian stock.

Ontong Java was visited by English missionary George Brown in mid 19th century. Brown described the population as Polynesian and referred to the place as Lua Niua. He recorded the existence of a two-class system in Ontong Java and, based on it, inferred that it was probable that exogamous classes formerly existed in Samoa as well.

The first detailed research on Ontong Java's inhabitants, however, was conducted by German ethnographers Ernst Sarfert and Hans Damm, during a German scientific expedition of the Southern Seas that took place in 1908–1910. This expedition visited both Ontong Java and neighboring Nukumanu Atoll, where they also carried out their research. Their work, "Luangiua und Nukumanu" was published in 1931. Sarfert and Damm claimed that both names of the atoll, Lord Howe and Ontong Java, were incorrect and called this atoll Luangiua in their works.

Jack London first called this atoll "Oolong". Later he would write in one of his novels:

Nobody ever comes to Lord Howe, or Ontong-Java as it is sometimes called. Thomas Cook & Son do not sell tickets to it, and tourists do not dream of its existence. Not even a white missionary has landed on its shore. Its five thousand natives are as peaceable as they are primitive. Yet they were not always peaceable. The Sailing Directions speak of them as hostile and treacherous. But the men who compile the Sailing Directions have never heard of the change that was worked in the hearts of the inhabitants, who, not many years ago, cut off a big bark and killed all hands with the exception of the second mate. The survivor carried the news to his brothers. The captains of three trading schooners returned with him to Lord Howe. They sailed their vessels right into the lagoon and proceeded to preach the white man's gospel that only white men shall kill white men and that the lesser breeds must keep hands off. The schooners sailed up and down the lagoon, harrying and destroying. There was no escape from the narrow sand-circle, no bush to which to flee. The men were shot down at sight, and there was no avoiding being sighted. The villages were burned, the canoes smashed, the chickens and pigs killed, and the precious cocoanut trees chopped down. For a month this continued, when the schooner sailed away; but the fear of the white man had been seared into the souls of the islanders and never again were they rash enough to harm one.

Ontong Java was later visited by Sydney University anthropologist Herbert Ian Hogbin in 1927. Hogbin's study of Ontong Java was published in 1934.

In late July 2025, Binghamton University Anthropology Professor Carl Lipo, University of Arizona archaeologist Terry, Hunt, and Christopher Filimoehala and Timothy Rieth from the International Archeological Research Institute, traveled Ontong Java to engage in a new exploratory dig on this remote atoll. These scientists aimed to hunt for physical evidence that might connect the concept of creating the massive moai statues found on Rapa Nui (Easter Island) to ancient stone monuments found on Ontong Java. These researchers were in luck as excavation found a site with deposits of charcoal and food waste that went down to the high tide line, suggesting humans may have been here not long after this remote volcanic island had emerged from the sea. They also found bones of the Pacific rat (Polynesian rat) which typically accompanied Polynesians wherever they traveled. In addition to their archeological digs, these scientists have chosen to involve the local population through sharing their findings with the local population.

In religious terms, Ontong Java is part of the Anglican Church of Melanesia Diocese of Malaita.

== See also ==
- Ontong Java Plateau
- Ontong Java Flying Fox

== Bibliography ==
- Hogbin, H. Ian. "The Social Organization of Ontong Java." London 1931
- Hogbin, H. Ian. "Transition Rites at Ontong Java." Oceania 1: 399–425. 1930
- Sarfert, Ernst, and Hans Damm. "Luangiua und Nukumanu." Ergebnisse der Südsee Expedition, 1908–1910. Hamburg 1931
