= Greg McLaren =

Australian poet (born 1967)

Greg McLaren (born 1967) is an Australian poet. Born in Kurri Kurri, he moved to Sydney in 1990 where he studied at the University of Sydney and in 2005 he was awarded a PhD in Australian Literature. His thesis was on Buddhist influences on the Australian poets Harold Stewart, Robert Gray and Judith Beveridge. As well as poetry, he has published reviews and criticism.

Julieanne Lamond writes in Southerly that "McLaren attempts to find a stable connection between the Buddhist acceptance in the face of unknowing ... and the anger and drama of his sense of history".

McLaren's work has been anthologised almost widely. His poems appear in Noel Rowe and Vivian Smith's Windchimes: Asia in Australian Poetry (Pandanus Press, 2006), Australian Poetry from 1788 (edited by Robert Gray and Geoffrey Lehmann), A Slow Combusting Hymn (edited by Kit Kelen and Jean Kent) and Contemporary Australian Poetry (edited by Martin Langford, Judith Beveridge, Judy Johnson and David Musgrave). His work was shortlisted in the Newcastle Poetry Prize in 1999, 2016, 2017, 2021 and 2022.

Windfall contains a series of often very loose adaptations of other poets' work, notably Tang dynasty poets Du Fu, Li Bai, Wang Wei and Bai Juyi, as well as more contemporary English-language poets such as William Carlos Williams, Charles Wright, Chase Twichell, Caroline Caddy and Judith Beveridge.

His seventh book, camping underground, is a post-apocalyptic/dystopian verse novel set in and around Cessnock in the Hunter Valley. Of it, novelist Fiona McFarlane writes that "McLaren has written the Great Australian Apocalypse. camping underground is a vernacular lament for our country’s past, present, and possible futures, but it never succumbs to cynicism: it feels urgent, affectionate, and beautiful, full of despair and love and a biting sense of humour. I read it in one sitting, completely spellbound, and it made my heart both shrink and stretch." Former Cessnock writer John Hughes writes that "McLaren’s verse grabs you like an accident, like the blood smell of metallic paint, or the flecks of hair and scalp behind a twisted steering wheel. His country towns, like his Australia, are human versions of a wrecker’s yard, as if all the violence and unlived life of their inhabitants concentrated in that instant before death and exploded. This poem is a record of that explosion." Pam Brown calls camping underground "a daring and brilliant work".

McLaren was awarded the 2026 Newcastle Poetry Prize by judges Jennifer Compton and Eunice Andrada for his sequence "Late sonnets".

== Bibliography ==
=== Poetry ===
Collections

- Everything falls in. Vagabond. 2000.
- Darkness Disguised (Sidewalk, 2002)
- The Kurri Kurri book of the dead. Puncher & Wattmann. 2007.
- After Han Shan (Flying Islands, 2012)
- Australian ravens (Puncher & Wattmann, 2016)
- Windfall (Puncher & Wattmann, 2018)
- camping underground (Puncher & Wattmann, 2022)

List of poems

Title	Year	First published	Reprinted/collected
Last Herculaneum night	1996	McLaren, Greg (March 1996). "Last Herculaneum night". Quadrant. 40 (3 [324]): 58.	

=== Critical studies and reviews of McLaren's work ===
The Kurri Kurri book of the dead

- Leves, Kerry (Autumn 2009). "Caught in the melee we look for signals : new poetry". Overland. 194: 89–92.
