= Charles Rowley (academic) =

Australian public servant and academic

- Born: 13 October 1906; Rylstone, New South Wales
- Died: 18 September 1985 (aged 78); Canberra

Academic background
- Education: University of Sydney (BA, MA)

Academic work
- Institutions: Sydney Teachers' College; Australian School of Pacific Administration; University of Papua New Guinea
- Main interests: Indigenous affairs in Australia and Papua New Guinea
- Notable works: The Destruction of Aboriginal Society (1970); Outcasts in White Australia (1971); The Remote Aborigines (1971)

Charles Dunford Rowley (13 October 1906 – 18 September 1985) was an Australian public servant and academic.

== Early life and education ==
Rowley was born in Rylstone, New South Wales on 13 October 1906 and grew up in country towns of central New South Wales. Attending the University of Sydney, where he played rugby league, Rowley graduated with a BA with first-class honours in English and history in 1926, and also gained first-class honours for his Masters thesis in 1939. He taught in State secondary schools from 1928 to 1938, when he was appointed a lecturer at Sydney Teachers' College.

== Military service and academic career ==
Joining the 2nd AIF during World War II, he served in the Australian territory of Papua New Guinea, attained the rank of Lieutenant-Colonel and was mentioned in dispatches for his work in the Australian Army Education Unit. From 1950 to 1964, he worked as principal of the Australian School of Pacific Administration, established by the Australian Government to train administrative personnel to work in Papua New Guinea.

He served on the Social Science Research Council from 1964 to 1967, commissioning and writing several books on Aboriginal Australians, including The Destruction of Aboriginal Society (1970), Outcasts in White Australia (1971) and The Remote Aborigines (1971).

In 1968, he moved to the University of Papua New Guinea and was appointed professor of politics, before returning to Australia to serve as the director of the Academy of the Social Sciences in Australia from 1974 to 1979. He worked as a visiting fellow at the Australian National University (ANU) from 1979 to 1980, and received an honorary LL.D from the ANU in 1983.

== Bibliography ==
=== Books ===
- Rowley, C.D. (1958). The Australians in German New Guinea, 1914-1921. Carlton, Victoria: Melbourne University Press.
- Rowley, C.D. (1960). The Lotus and the Dynamo: a Traveller in Changing South-East Asia. Sydney: Angus and Robertson.
- Rowley, C.D. (1965). The New Guinea villager: a retrospect from 1964. Melbourne: Cheshire.
- Rowley, C.D. (1970). The Destruction of Aboriginal Society. Canberra: Australian National University Press.
- Rowley, C.D. (1971). Outcasts in White Australia. Canberra: Australian National University Press.
- Rowley, C.D. (1971). The Remote Aborigines. Canberra: Australian National University Press.
- Rowley, C.D. (1978). A Matter of Justice. Canberra: Australian National University Press.
