= Philippines–Australia Community Assistance Program =

Bilateral development program

The Philippines–Australia Community Assistance Program (PACAP) is an ongoing bilateral development program run jointly by the Governments of the Philippines and Australia and funded by the Australian Agency for International Development (AusAID). PACAP was established in 1986, and is Australia’s longest-running development program in the Philippines. PACAP's counterpart agency is the National Economic and Development Authority (NEDA).

== Goals ==
The aim of PACAP is to reduce poverty and its consequences in communities throughout the Philippines. The program supports community-initiated, economically sustainable, ecologically sound and gender responsive development projects. It provides financial assistance and multi-level capability building to poor communities, who are thus empowered to pursue economic growth and achieve better standards of living. All PACAP projects are initiated by, and implemented in partnership with, community, government and civil society organizations.

== History ==
PACAP started in the Philippines in 1986 in the time of major social and political change following the People Power Revolution and Corazon Aquino’s assumption of power.

The Program has always been managed by a Secretariat of local staff. In PACAP's original design, the program was managed by AusAID staff at the Australian Embassy in Manila. However, in early 2005 the management was turned over to Hassall and Associates, International (HAI), an Australian managing contractor, now part of Gutteridge Haskins & Davey Pty. Ltd. (GHD). GHD-HAI has been managing AusAID-PACAP in collaboration with its Philippine partner, Sustainable Development Solutions (SDS).

In its first eighteen years of operation, PACAP supported about one thousand small community-based activities, benefiting around 250,000 poor people. It achieved this in partnership with about five hundred non-governmental and people's organizations. During one of its most recent phases (January 2005 - September 2010), PACAP funded almost five hundred further engagements with over 250 different groups.

== Operations ==
PACAP is a flexible facility that is willing to fund almost any project that aims to alleviate poverty. In PACAP’s long history, it has supported a great diversity of projects including literacy, health, potable water and sanitation projects; eco-tourism projects; and agricultural and aquacultural projects including: mud crab and ornamental fish production projects; coconut, pili nut and organic vegetable production projects; mangrove and watershed rehabilitation projects; and abaca, pina and raffia fiber production projects.

PACAP has also worked with co-operatives producing local handicrafts, with the handicapped and the elderly, with street beggars, with abused women and children, with the children of overseas workers, with prisoners, with prostitutes, and with the victims of AIDS and filariasis. It has also supported a children’s choir, worked with indigenous peoples on ancestral domain issues, and helped persons displaced by conflict. It has provided funds to build warehouses and other storage and processing facilities, medical centers, water-testing laboratories, workshops, classrooms, a floating literacy center, footbridges, boats used by emergency medical services, and fishing boats.

The current phase of PACAP is scheduled to deliver A$ 20,000,000 (approximately Php 800M) in grant assistance to projects all over the Philippines. PACAP grants are being delivered through two modalities: the Focal Community Assistance Scheme (FOCAS) and the Responsive Assistance Scheme (RAS):

=== Focal Community Assistance Scheme (FOCAS) ===
FOCAS is a more restricted mode of grant assistance than RAS, operating only in specific geographic regions and around carefully chosen ‘themes’. It is the main strategic mode for provincial government engagement in five provinces in the southern Philippines - Agusan del Sur, Bohol, Misamis Occidental, Northern Samar and Surigao del Norte. Within these target provinces, each FOCAS encompasses a portfolio of related projects that are either 'landscape' and/or 'thematically' based, each covering one or more barangays or municipalities.

=== Responsive Assistance Scheme (RAS) ===
The grant allocations provided through RAS are less restrictive than those provided through FOCAS. Although RAS funds, like those of FOCAS, are primarily distributed in the southern Philippines – this being the poorest region within the nation – RAS also retains the ability to respond to needs across the country, whatever form these take, and wherever these occur.

== Collaboration ==
Under RAS, PACAP may involve itself in multi-donor programs that encourage cooperation and collaboration from various funding donors for as long as it is within the strategic framework of PACAP. An example is PACAP's participation in the World Bank initiated Development Innovation Marketplace Program (DIMP).

== Publications ==
PACAP has produced a number of publications to share its knowledge of community development experience to the wider community development network. Most recently, PACAP has produced online resources related to microfinance and social enterprise development.
