= ASEAN Centre for Energy =

Intergovernmental organisation

- Abbreviation: ACE
- Formation: 1 January 1999
- Founded at: Jakarta, Indonesia
- Headquarters: Indonesia
- Executive Director: Dato' Ir. Ts. Razib Dawood
- Website: www.aseanenergy.org

ASEAN Centre for Energy (ACE) is an intergovernmental organisation within the structure of the Association of Southeast Asian Nations (ASEAN). Its mission is to 'accelerate the integration of energy strategies within ASEAN by providing relevant information and expertise to ensure the necessary energy policies and programmes are in harmony with the region's economic growth and environmental sustainability.' Dato' Ir. Ts. Razib Dawood serves as Executive Director.

== Overview ==
The ASEAN Centre for Energy (ACE) was established on 1 January 1999 to represent the eleven ASEAN Member States' (AMS) interests in the energy sector. It is guided by a Governing Council that consists of Senior Officials on Energy leaders from each AMS and a representative from the ASEAN Secretariat as an ex-officio member.

Code	Name	Government representative
BRU	Brunei	Ministry of Energy
CAM	Cambodia	Ministry of Mines and Energy
IDN	Indonesia	Ministry of Energy and Mineral Resources
LAO	Laos	Ministry of Energy and Mines
MAS	Malaysia	Ministry of Energy and Natural Resources
MYA	Myanmar	Ministry of Electricity and Energy
PHI	Philippines	Department of Energy
SIN	Singapore	Energy Market Authority
THA	Thailand	Ministry of Energy
VIE	Vietnam	Ministry of Industry and Trade
TLS	(Timor-Leste) Timor Leste	Prime Minister

Hosted by the Ministry of Energy and Mineral Resources of Indonesia, ACE's office is located in Jakarta.

On 26 May 2015, ACE Governing Council endorsed the business plan of an Enhanced ACE: a high-performing institution and a regional centre of excellence which builds a coherent, coordinated, focused and robust energy policy agenda and strategy for ASEAN.

=== Analytical work ===
One of the main activities of ACE is to produce analytical output. This includes reports, policy briefs and academic publications. Its flagship publication is the ASEAN Energy Outlook, which is published every two years (previously once every few years).

=== Relationship to the ASEAN Plan of Action for Energy Cooperation ===
ACE's work both informs and is informed by the ASEAN Plan of Action for Energy Cooperation (APAEC), a series of policy documents designed to promote multilateral energy cooperation and integration to attain the goals of the ASEAN Economic Community.

Broadly speaking, the current blueprint -- APAEC 2016 - 2025 - touches upon seven programmatic areas:

1. ASEAN Power Grid
2. Trans-ASEAN Gas Pipeline
3. Coal and Clean Coal Technology
4. Energy Efficiency and Conservation
5. Renewable Energy
6. Regional Energy Policy and Planning
7. Civilian Nuclear Energy

The current blueprint also highlights strategies for how to realize, among others, ASEAN's aspirational target of achieving a 23% renewable energy share of the primary energy mix by 2025 and 30% energy intensity reduction in 2025 based on 2005 levels.

The group released a roadmap to 2025, outlining its plan to increase renewables and use science-based concepts to guide it toward decarbonization. The goal is to reach between 42 percent and 47 percent of renewables. Because they are "variable," grid modernization is also necessary. Grid modernization may involve using smart meters to provide real-time energy usage data and large-scale batteries to stabilize the grid as renewable energy output varies.

== Structure ==
ACE consists of the following departments:

- Office of Executive Director
- Administrative and Finance
- ASEAN Plan of Action for Energy Cooperation (APAEC)
- Modelling and Policy Planning (MPP)
- Power, Fossil Fuel, Alternative Energy and Storage (PFS)
- Renewable Energy and Energy Efficiency (REE)

=== ASEAN Plan of Action and Energy for Energy Cooperation (APAEC) ===
The APAEC Department consists of the APAEC Secretariat, Business Development Unit, Information-Communication-Technology (ICT) and Legal Affairs.

==== APAEC Secretariat ====
The APAEC Secretariat is responsible for coordinating, facilitating, monitoring and scorecard the implementation of APAEC. To support the implementation of APAEC, the Secretariat organises and encourages the conduct of official meetings, dialogue, capacity building, workshops and other events, and facilitates the engagement with Dialogue Partners (DPs) and International Organisations (IOs).

ACE serves as the secretariat for five (5) Specialised Energy Body and Sub-Sector Networks, namely ASEAN Forum on Coal (AFOC), Energy Efficiency and Conservation Sub-Sector Network (EE&C-SSN), Renewable Energy Sub-Sector Network (RE-SSN), Regional Energy Policy and Planning Sub-Sector Network (REPP-SSN), and Nuclear Energy Cooperation Sub Sector Network (NEC-SSN). Additionally, ACE acts as secretariat for the Senior Officials Meeting on Energy Plus Three Energy Policy Governing Group (SOME+3 EPGG) and SOME – Ministry of Economy, Trade, and Industry (METI) Japan.

==== Business Development Unit ====
The Business Development Unit (BDU) was established to develop and execute business plans for ensuring the financial sustainability of ACE. The BDU oversights the proposal preparation, submission, and sustainable business operations and manages and organises commercial events, certification, and other activities.

==== Information-Communication-Technology ====
Information-Communication-Technology (ICT) is responsible for identifying and implementing IT strategies, managing IT infrastructures required to deliver business services, and providing system and procedures to store, process and communicate information and knowledge in digital form and support ICT assistance day-to-day operations of the ACE business.

==== Legal Affairs ====
Legal Affairs was established in ACE to provide legal assistance in drafting and reviewing of ACE's official documents and giving advice in settlement of disputes, breach of contract and related matters, including recommendations and negotiation with partners.

=== Modelling and Policy Planning (MPP) ===
The Energy Policy, Policy Planning and Modelling (MPP) Department is one of the research departments in ACE. It has the mandate to assist ASEAN countries in planning the energy policies and how these energy policies implemented through research and data modelling. The research activity focuses on attaining energy security, accessibility, affordability, and sustainability in the region.

MPP Department conducts research and study on Programme Area No.3 Coal and Clean Coal Technology (CCT) in collaboration with the ASEAN Forum on Coal (AFOC) to optimise the role of CCT in facilitating the transition towards sustainable and lower emission development. MPP Department also assists the redevelopment of the ASEAN Coal Database to facilitate CCT investment and partnership.

As a contribution in Programme Area No. 5 Renewable Energy, MPP Department collaborates with Renewable Energy Sub-Sector Network (RE-SSN) through research recommendation to achieve the aspirational target for increasing the renewable energy share to 23% in the ASEAN energy mix and the share of RE in installed power capacity to 35% by 2025, also reduce energy intensity in the ASEAN region to 32% by 2025.

MPP Department supports the Programme Area No. 6 Regional Energy Policy and Planning (REPP) by providing studies through publication of energy outlook series. This outlook identifies the ways in how ASEAN can reach the aspirational targets, and contributes as a reference to develop concrete action plans for various ASEAN Specialised Energy Bodies (SEB) and Sub-Sector Networks (SSN) in their respective Programme Areas under APAEC. Related to Programme Area No. 7 Civilian Nuclear Energy (CNE), MPP Department supports regional public communication strategy and plans to enhance understanding on nuclear power generation by developing study and public survey in collaboration with Nuclear Energy Cooperation Sub-Sector Network (NEC-SSN).

To enhance ACE's role in energy data and knowledge hub, the MPP department maintains the ASEAN Energy Database System (AEDS) as a web-based system of integrated and comprehensive energy data and information. The platform provides insights into the ASEAN energy landscape through reliable energy statistics, news, and policy data across the region.

As part of ACE's role as the think-tank and catalyst, MPP Department publishes a number of research reports, studies, policy briefs, and popular articles; organises and participates at various ASEAN official meetings, as well as maintains and expands ACE's networks and collaborations with research institutes, academics, IOs, and business associations.

=== Power, Fossil Fuel, Alternative Energy and Storage (PFS) ===
The Power, Fossil Fuel, Alternative Energy and Storage (PFS) Department is one of the research departments in ACE and is in charge of supporting countries in their use of conventional energy sources and alternative energy to achieve energy security, accessibility, affordability and sustainability for all. It covers the focus on the power sector (conventional and renewable), fossil fuels (oil and natural gas), alternative energy (nuclear, hydrogen, etc.) and energy storage.

PFS Department assists the Heads of ASEAN Power Utilities/Authorities (HAPUA) to implement Programme Area No. 1 ASEAN Power Grid (APG) to expand regional multilateral electricity, trading, strengthening grid resilience, and modernisation, and promote clean and renewable energy integration.

PFS Department assists the ASEAN Council on Petroleum (ASCOPE) to implement Programme Area No. 2 Trans-ASEAN Gas Pipeline to pursue the development of a common gas market for ASEAN by enhancing gas and LNG connectivity and accessibility.

PFS Department conducts researches and programmes on Programme Area No.3 Coal and Clean Coal Technology (CCT) in collaboration with the ASEAN Forum on Coal (AFOC) to optimise the role of clean coal technology in facilitating the transition towards sustainable and lower emission development.

PFS Department provides recommendation studies and collaborates with Renewable Energy Sub-sector Network (RE-SSN) Focal Points to achieve the aspirational target for increasing the component of renewable energy to 23% by 2025 in the ASEAN energy mix, particularly on power sector to increase the share of RE in installed power capacity to 35% by 2025.

PFS Department supports the AMS to build human resource capabilities on nuclear science and technology for power generation by implementing Programme Area No. 7 Civilian Nuclear Energy (CNE) in collaboration with Nuclear Energy Cooperation Sub-Sector Network (NEC-SSN).

As part of ACE's role as the think-tank, catalyst and knowledge hub, PFS Department publishes a number of reports, policy briefs, and popular article; organises and participate at various virtual ASEAN official meetings, ACE own organised events, and external regional/international events; and maintain and expands ACE's networks with research institute/academics, IOs, and professionals/business associations.

PFS Department is representing ACE as the core member of the Global Consortium on Power System Transformation (G-PST).

=== Renewable Energy and Energy Efficiency (REE) ===
The Sustainable Energy, Renewable Energy, Energy Efficiency and Conservation (REE) Department is one of the technical pillars of ACE that focusing on renewable energy and energy efficiency to support the implementation of the ASEAN Plan of Action for Energy Cooperation (APAEC).

REE Department is responsible for supporting ASEAN Member States (AMS) in promoting sustainable energy use, including renewable energy sources and efficient utilisation of energy, for achieving energy security, accessibility, affordability and sustainability for all.

In its capacity, REE Department directly supports the Energy Efficiency and Conservation Sub-Sector Network (EE&C-SSN) in achieving the APAEC energy intensity target of 32% reduction by 2025. Guided by APAEC, it supports the development of Sustainable EE in Building and Cooling Roadmap for ASEAN, ASEAN Energy Management Certification Scheme, product registration system, and appliances policy roadmap, among others.

REE Department also directly supports the Renewable Energy Sub-Sector Network (RE-SSN) in achieving the APAEC renewable energy target of 23% share in the primary energy supply and 35% share in installed power capacity by 2025. Guided by APAEC, it supports the development of ASEAN Renewable Energy Outlook, RE R&D nodal network, biofuel and bioenergy studies, and RE Information and Training Centre, among others.

As a think-tank, REE Department conducts research activities on renewable energy and energy efficiency. The research activities then publish as reports, policy briefs or popular articles, reported to ASEAN official meetings and disseminated through public events, such as webinars.

As a catalyst and knowledge hub, REE Department conducts cooperation activities with key stakeholders such as various ASEAN institutions, Dialogue Partners (DPs), International Organisations (IOs), research institutes, professional associations, and media. The activities include joint projects and knowledge sharing.

REE Department represents ACE as the coordinator for official cooperation with IEA, IRENA, UNEP-U4E, GIZ, NSTDA, and CTCN. It is also an integral part of the cross-departmental activities, such as the ASEAN-German Energy Programme (AGEP) and the ASEAN Climate Change and Energy Project (ACCEPT).

== Milestones ==
- On 22 May 1998, Signing of ASEAN Centre for Energy establishment agreement in the Philippines.
- On 1 January 1999, Official commencement of ASEAN Centre for Energy in Indonesia.
- On 3 July 1999, Adoption of ASEAN Plan of Action for Energy Cooperation in Bangkok, Thailand.
- On 3 July 2000, The launch of ASEAN Energy Awards.
- On 5 July 2002, Signing of MoU on Trans-ASEAN Gas Pipeline in Bali, Indonesia.
- On 9 June 2004, The 1st Joint Ministerial Statement of ASEAN plus China, Japan, Korea (ASEAN+3) in the Philippines.
- On 23 August 2007, Signing of MoU on ASEAN Power Grid in Singapore.
- On 20 September 2011, Signing of ASEAN-International Energy Agency MoU in Brunei Darussalam.
- On 7 October 2015, Endorsement of ASEAN Plan of Action for Energy Cooperation 2016-2025 by 33rd ASEAN Ministers on Energy Meeting in Malaysia.
- On 27 September 2017, Signing of Energy Purchase and Wheeling Agreement in the Philippines, between Lao PDR, Thailand and Malaysia.
- On 30 October 2018, Signing of ASEAN-International Renewable Energy Agency MoU in Singapore.
