= ASEAN–Australia Development Cooperation Program =

Seven-year program

The ASEAN–Australia Development Cooperation Program (AADCP, or AADCP II) is a seven-year program jointly managed by the ASEAN Secretariat and the Australian Agency for International Development (AusAID—aimed at helping ASEAN establish a regional Economic Community by 2015.

== Background ==
=== History ===
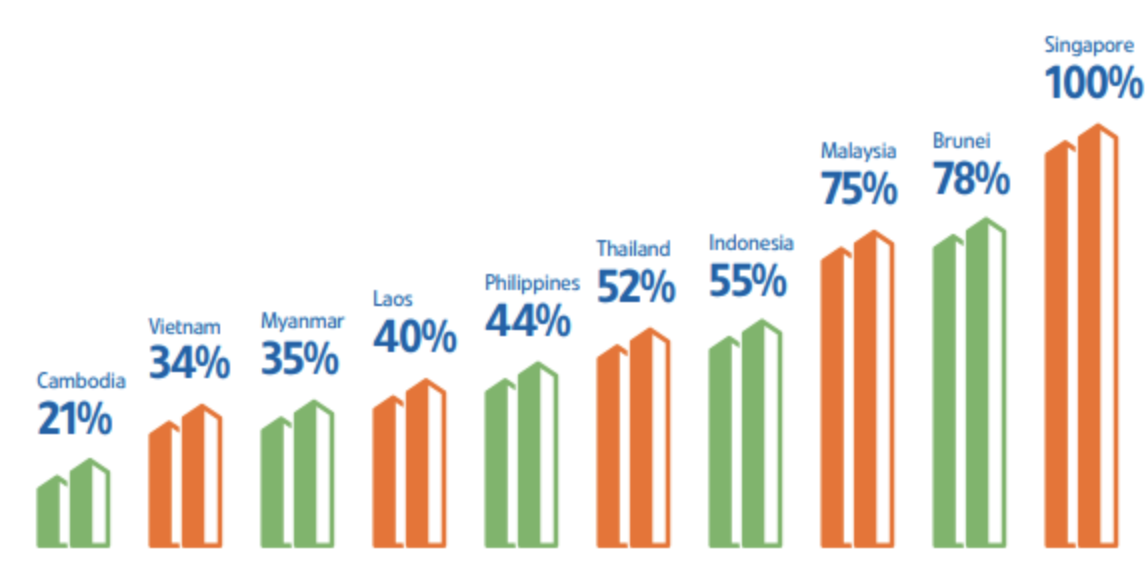
Urbanisation rate across ASEAN nations, 2016

AADCP is a program initiated jointly by two organisations, the Australian government and the Association of Southeast Asian Nations (ASEAN). ASEAN, a key association to connect Southeast Asian nations, was founded by Indonesia, Malaysia, the Philippines, Singapore, and Thailand in 1967, and later joined by Brunei, Vietnam, Laos, Myanmar, and Cambodia.

Australia has a strong interest in the regional development of the Southeast Asian region, due to geographic proximity and socioeconomic interactions. Over 15 per cent of Australia's total trade involves countries within ASEAN, totalling over $100 billion in value in 2014. This number reached $224 billion in 2016. However, unequal development in Southeast Asia remains a problem that requires collaborative effort. Newer members of ASEAN Cambodia, Laos, Myanmar, and Vietnam, referred to as CLMV countries, lose custom revenue from ASEAN imports in the short term, but long-term economic benefits outweigh these losses. AADCP Phase I was signed in August 2020 with a $45 billion deal, with initial planning having started in January 1999. AADCP Phase II started after a one-year transition period.

=== Predecessor program, AAECP (1974–2004) ===
The predecessor to AADCP, a program called ASEAN Australia Economic Cooperation Program (AAECP), was initiated in 1974. It had three stages, lasting for thirty years, from 1974 to 2004. At the end of AAECP Phase III, AADCP was formed to continue to provide support to regional economic development by strengthening collaboration between ASEAN and Australia. AAECP received recognition from both Australia and ASEAN: "The strength of the partnership between Australia and ASEAN, aside from the advantages presented by their geographic proximity, is in part due to the increasing complementarities of the relationship and the dynamism of the economies in the region. It is also due to both partners' determination to continually assess the relationship and implement changes to suit the needs of the two sides." In the last phase of AAECP, Australia strengthened the scope of technical assistance on energy policy and research analysis.

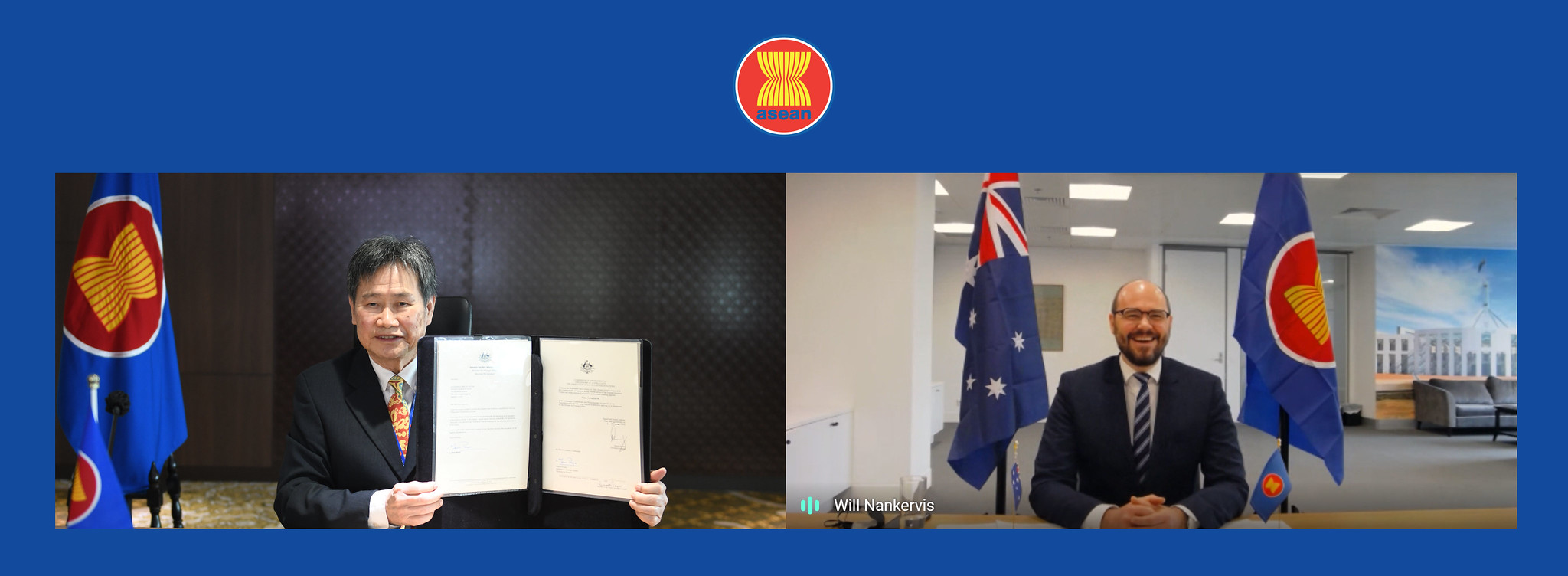
Video conference between the Australian ambassador and the secretary-general of ASEAN on 15 September 2020

=== Function ===
Southeast Asian nations underwent dramatic transformations between 1974 and 2004, as they achieved significant economic growth under globalisation. However, uneven development in terms of economic growth, equity, and exchange still remained major concerns. The main objective of AADCP is to assist ASEAN in achieving regional development goals through cooperation with Australia. Other objectives include enhancing institutional capacities, facilitating cooperation in the fields of science and technology, as well as helping new members integrate into ASEAN smoothly through cooperation programs.

AADCP is funded by Australia's overseas aid agency, AusAID, a principal foreign aid management agency of the Australian government, supervised by the Department of Foreign Affairs and Trade.

== Program structure ==
=== Phase I ===
==== Program Stream ====
Launched in 1999, Program Stream (PS) consisted of twelve main projects to help ASEAN integrate into one market by focusing on the quality and safety of agricultural and food products. These are pre-selected, medium-term economic integration projects. The first four PS projects cover areas including e-commerce, skill-recognition systems, fruit and vegetable quality control, and fishery products. Australia Implementing Partners (AIP) were appointed for each stream to carry out the program. While all the projects were pre-selected, funding allocation among ASEAN members was ambiguous, and the challenge is to meet the diverse interests of all regions in the project selection and design phase.

===== Regional Partnership Scheme =====
Regional Partnership Schemes (RPS) facilitated 29 small-scale projects by establishing collaboration between the Australian government and ASEAN partners. All projects are jointly prepared and operated by AADCP's Program Planning and Monitoring Support Unit (PPMSU) and ASEAN. ANSEA's AEC Blueprint provides guidelines for program design and implementation.

====== Regional Economic Policy Support Facility ======
The Regional Economic Policy Support Facility (REPSF) was the first stream initiated in 2002, focusing on small- to medium-scale economic policy research projects. Policy research was designed to help ASEC improve economic integration among all ASEAN members. REPSF has a few guidelines, including modalities, team selection, and research management to ensure research gives priority to the corresponding stakeholders of AADCP while maintaining a certain degree of research autonomy. Due to the targeted agency and focused research theme, REPSF provided funding for a unique collection of first-hand data, such as "A Background Paper for the Strategic Plan of Action on ASEAN Cooperation in Food and Agriculture (2005–2010)" and 03/006(e) "The Pattern of Intra ASEAN Trade in the Priority Goods Sectors". Upon completion, research reports were presented to corresponding ASEAN collaborators, providing insights for policymaking.

=== Phase II ===
Phase II expanded the scope of workstreams to the following 11: corporate development, monitoring and evaluation, services, investment, consumer protection, agriculture, connectivity, financial integration, cross-cutting issues, and the Initiative for ASEAN Integration & Narrowing Development Gap. These work streams were developed to improve ASEC's capacity to achieve its post-2015 agenda. Major delays occurred at the start of AADCP II due to difficulties in funding management and program development. Statistics showed poor management capability, including inexperienced staff and uncompetitive salaries, at the initial stage. The 2012 assessment result suggested that there was a need to improve management systems within ASEAN and to build personal relationships to facilitate program implementation and economic integration.

AADCP II has four major components:

1. strengthen institutional capacity: $8 million
2. economic research: $10 million
3. economic community implementation: $22 million
4. technical specialist and management support: $17 million.

The 2019 annual report highlights achievements of AADCP in providing support to agriculture and food, research on understanding foreign direct investment in ASEAN, and strengthening consumer production. Additionally, based on previous feedback, the project management system was strengthened by increasing the capacity of ASEAN secretaries, which can help facilitate future programs more efficiently.

== Funding ==
AADCP is fully funded by the Australian government. Initial funding for Phase I (2002–08) was A$45 million; AADCP II committed A$57 million for 2008–19. Funding is delivered directly to the ASEAN secretariat, but management is done by the ASEAN secretariat and the Australian government through outside contractors.

== Projects ==
=== Aquafeeds in Asia ===
In 1992, 84% of total global aquaculture production was in Asian countries. This research study was published by the Farm-made Aquafeeds Organisation (FAO) and AADCP to help improve economical feeding and production strategies. The project also includes national reports of regional ingredients, manufacturing, and feeding strategies.

=== Assessment study of Ha Noi Plan of Action ===
This REPSF research project provides a comprehensive assessment of the progress and achievements of the Ha Noi Plan of Action (HPA), which is considered the first program contributing to ASEAN's Vision 2020. HPA was designed to provide management, marketing, and public relations tools to guide ASEAN's work. Because there was no defined achievement indicator, assessments were largely qualitative. The overall conclusion was that countries largely benefited from the HPA.

=== ASEAN-Australia-New Zealand Free Trade Agreement ===
The ASEAN-Australia-New Zealand Free Trade Agreement (AANZFTA) helps develop ASEAN's capacity to be involved in trading negotiations and maximise the benefits of trading programs. This aligns with Australia's aid investment plan strategies. Part of AADCI's post-2015 agenda is to ensure effective implementation of AANZFTA and raise trading opportunities. By maximising real commercial benefits and increasing ASEAN's capacity, AADCI supports AANZFTA, aligning with the major workstreams of AADCI Stage II.

=== Animal health and biosecurity ===
Animal and plant health management is a traditional collaboration area between ASEAN and Australia. AADCP continues this tradition in order to provide regional areas a more advanced management system in regulation risks associated with product export and diseases. International regulations often require exporting countries to provide information on a list of pets, and such obligations suggest a requirement to comply with standards rather than voluntary effort. The challenges with related programs are that not all ASEAN countries have surplus products for exporting, thus decreasing the need to achieve internationally recognized standards.
