= Australian Aid =

Governmental aid agency

Australia’s development program, DFAT

Agency overview
- Formed: 1 December 1973; 52 years ago
- Preceding agency: AusAID
- Jurisdiction: Australian Government
- Headquarters: Canberra, ACT, Australia
- Employees: 1,652 (April 2013)
- Ministers responsible: Penny Wong, Minister for Foreign Affairs and Trade; Pat Conroy, Minister for International Development and the Pacific
- Agency executive: Ewan McDonald, Head of the Office of the Pacific (OTP)
- Parent department: Department of Foreign Affairs and Trade
- Website: dfat.gov.au/development/australias-development-program

Australian Aid is the brand name used to identify projects in developing countries supported by the Australian Government. As of 2014 the Department of Foreign Affairs and Trade (DFAT) has been responsible for Australia's official development assistance (foreign aid) to developing countries.

The Australian Development Assistance Agency (ADAA) was founded in 1974 under the Whitlam government, renamed the Australian Development Assistance Bureau (ADAB) in 1976, then the Australian International Development Assistance Bureau (AIDAB) in 1987, before becoming the Australian Agency for International Development, known as AusAID, in 1995. It was merged into DFAT without prior consultation by the Abbott government in 2014, with aid slashed to most regions apart from the Pacific region.

== History ==
The agency was founded in 1974 under the Whitlam Labor government as the Australian Development Assistance Agency (ADAA) to fulfil a role that had previously been the responsibility of several departments. One of the driving forces in its establishment was Sir John Crawford. At this time it was a government department within the Ministry for Foreign Affairs. It was renamed the Australian Development Assistance Bureau (ADAB) and brought under the Foreign Affairs and Trade portfolio in 1976 under the Fraser Liberal government.

The agency became the Australian International Development Assistance Bureau (AIDAB) under the Hawke government in 1987, before being renamed Australian Agency for International Development (AusAID) by the Keating government in 1995.

Soon after coming to power in September 2013, the Abbott government announced the integration of AusAID with DFAT, which was effected in November 2013. According to a consultant's later report, "The merger was conducted with no prior analysis and without consultation, particularly with AusAID". The merger was fully implemented by June 2014, when Foreign Minister Julie Bishop announced a new paradigm for the Australian foreign aid program. She said that expanding opportunities for people, businesses and communities is the key to both promoting economic growth and reducing poverty. The aid program would now provide a sharper focus on investing in drivers of economic growth, including trade, infrastructure; education and health; and empowering women and girls to create new jobs and opportunities that lift people out of poverty. A later major stakeholder survey of the Australian aid program showed that the transition was not as smooth as hoped, with staff continuity, staff expertise and predictability of funding all performing particularly poorly.

On Monday 21 September 2015, following a cabinet reshuffle by Australia's new Prime Minister Malcolm Turnbull, a new Ministerial position was created to cover management of Australia's aid program. Steven Ciobo became the first Minister for International Development and the Pacific, followed by Concetta Fierravanti-Wells six months later.

== Today ==
As of 2021, "Australian Aid" is the branding used to identify projects supported by the Australian Government. The logo uses the name accompanied by a kangaroo, available in various combinations of black, red, blue and white. The logo "must be used on all aid-related products and activities funded by the Australian Government. The Australian Aid identifier is used to badge Australia aid programs, projects and products". The program itself does not appear to be administered by a named unit, with information about Australian ODA on a DFAT web page titled "Australia’s development program". Ewen McDonald is the inaugural Head of the Office of the Pacific (OTP), as one of six groups reporting to secretary Frances Adamson.

== Funding ==
There have been repeated changes to official development assistance (ODA, defined as "financial aid given by governments and other agencies to support the economic, environmental, social, and political development of developing countries") since the inception of the first agency. The level of 0.47% of gross domestic product during the Whitlam years was slashed to 0.33% under the Hawke and Keating governments, and has at times been even lower under the Howard government. Cuts have not been limited to aid levels either; in mid-1996, the Howard government slashed the agency's running costs budget by 24% amidst a round of cost-cutting measures.

In 2005, John Howard committed Australia to double Australian aid to about $4 billion a year by 2010. At the time of the 2007–08 budget, the Government announced total aid of $3.2 billion and an expectation "to continue increasing development assistance, to $3.5 billion in 2008-09, $3.8 billion in 2009–10 and $4.3 billion in 2010–11".

The 2005–06 Annual Report recorded 18 staff in the senior executive service out of a total of 516 public servant staff. 68 AusAID public servants were serving long-term postings outside Australia. These figures do not include locally employed staff outside Australia.

Total Australian ODA in 2005–06 was A$2,605 million, not all of it administered by AusAID. AusAID administered $1,587 million of expenses in 2005–06 and also had departmental expenses (i.e. under its direct control) of A$78 million.

Over most of AusAID's existence, tenders providing services associated with aid programs were generally limited to firms from Australia or New Zealand, or firms doing substantial business in those countries; only in 2005 did the agency liberalise its guidelines to allow firms from the recipient country to apply for some tenders. The agency was considerably more liberal with construction contracts, allowing bidding from any company worldwide, though this has the effect of shutting out many potential bidders from recipient countries.

In 2002, as part of an international initiative, AusAID untied aid to Least Developed Countries. Since the White Paper in 2006, all AusAID procurement was untied (i.e. open to international firms) except for the Australia Indonesia Partnership for Reconstruction and Development (AIPRD).

On 18 December 2008, the William J. Clinton Foundation released a list of all contributors. It included AusAID, which gave between US$10–25 million.

In July 2010, under the Labor government, AusAID became an executive agency, separate from the Department of Foreign Affairs and Trade (DFAT).

In December 2014, the Abbott government announced significant cuts to Australia's foreign aid program. Treasurer Joe Hockey said that savings of $3.7 billion in the foreign aid program over the next four years would offset new commitments in defence and national security. These cuts, reflected in the 2015-16 Budget, meant that Australia's aid budget had fallen to $4 billion, down from a peak of $5.6 billion in 2012–13.

According to calculations by the Development Policy Centre at ANU, the Abbott-Turnbull-Morrison government's budget cuts marked both the largest ever multi-year aid cuts (33%) and largest ever single year cut (20% and $1 billion in 2015–16). The cuts would see Australian aid fall to 0.22% of Gross National Income in 2017–18 and then to 0.21% in 2019–20, the lowest level in Australia's history.

The 2015–16 Budget outlined the cuts. With the exception of Cambodia, Nepal and Timor-Leste, aid to countries in Asia was cut by 40%. The Pacific and Papua New Guinea (PNG) were only slightly cut, while Sub-Saharan Africa was slashed by 70%, and aid to the Middle East was cut by 43%. PNG replaced Indonesia as the largest recipient of Australian aid, receiving $477.4 million in 2015–16.

According to research conducted by the Development Policy Centre at ANU, Australia's declining aid expenditure puts it at odds with the aid budget trajectories that many other OECD countries are following. In 2013, the Conservative government in the UK became the first G7 donor to reach the OECD's 0.7% of GNI target, increasing its ODA by 27.8% on 2012 levels.

In May 2016, the government handed down the 2016/17 federal budget which confirmed the final round of Australian aid cuts, $224 million or 7.4% of the Australian aid program. This was the sixth-largest cut in any one year of the aid program's history. Increases to the aid program over the forward estimates (the next four years) were pegged to the rate of inflation.

Fairfax Media's Matt Wade reported that Australia's aid program, while only about 1% of budget expenditure, has made up around 25% of all budget cuts announced by the government for the period 2013–14 to 2018–19. The Lowy Institute's Jonathan Pryke reporte that these cuts have seen Australia tumble in international rankings and left Australia at an all-time low when it comes to its aid generosity as measured by aid as a proportion of Gross National Income.

According to the OECD, 2020 official development assistance from Australia decreased by 10.6% to US$2.6 billion.

As of July 2026, Australia remains the dominant provider of aid in the Pacific, accounting for 70% of aid to the region.

== Projects ==
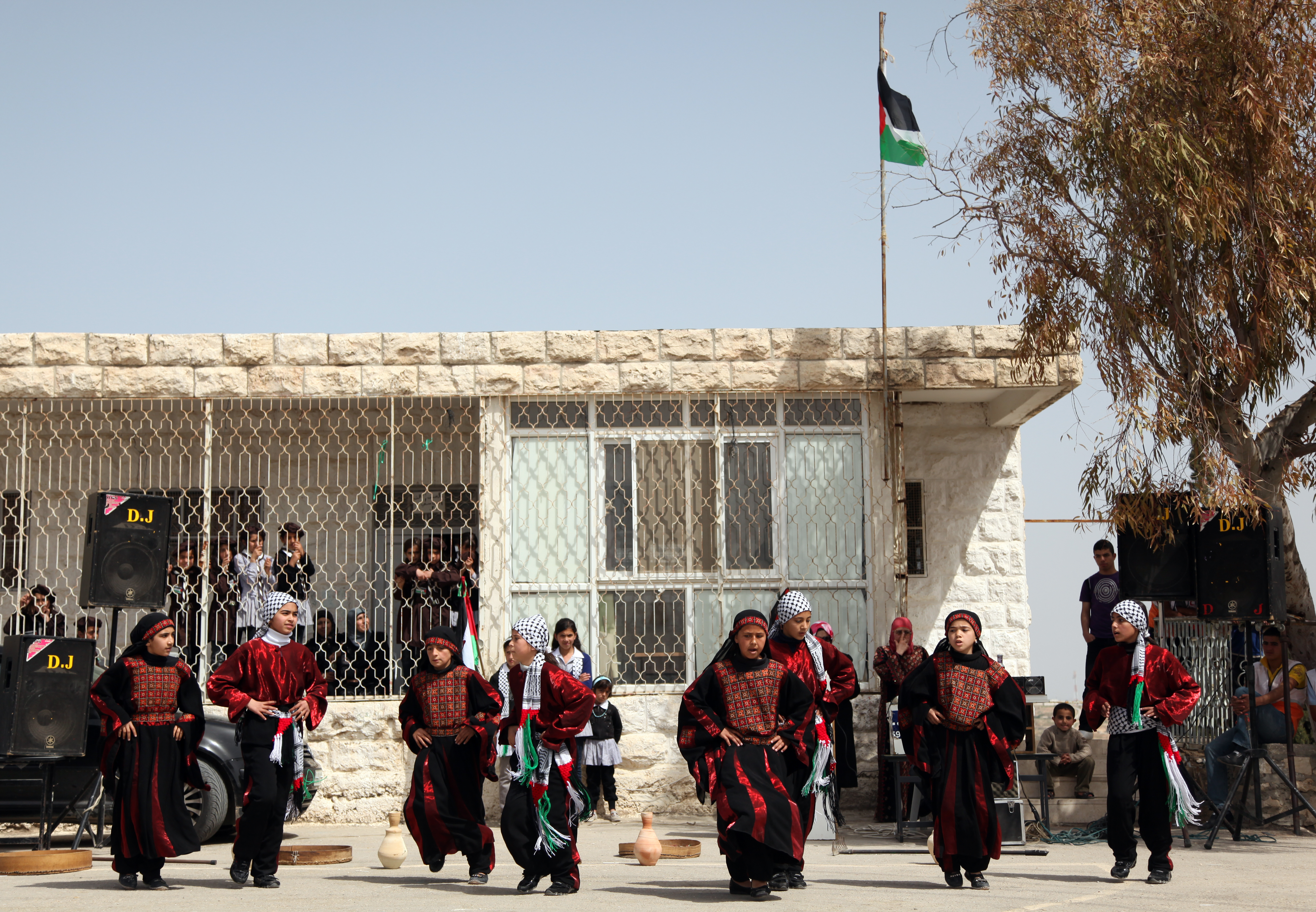
Girls dancing Dabkeh (Palestinian National Folkloric Dance) during the celebrations of the newly built WASH facilities by UNICEF and funded by AusAid, Al Shioukh elementary girls' school, Hebron, 2011.

It operated programs in five separate regions: Papua New Guinea, South Asia (Bangladesh, Bhutan, India, the Maldives, Nepal, Pakistan and Sri Lanka), East Asia (Burma, Cambodia, China, East Timor, Indonesia, Laos, Mongolia, the Philippines, Thailand and Vietnam), the Pacific (the Cook Islands, Fiji, Kiribati, Micronesia, Nauru, Niue, Samoa, the Solomon Islands, Tokelau, Tonga, Tuvalu and Vanuatu) and the Middle East (Afghanistan and Iraq).

AusAID also ran the Australian Youth Ambassadors for Development program, a volunteer program allowing Australians aged 18–30 to volunteer for up to a year in countries throughout Asia and the Pacific. Australian Aid partners with several Australian charities for its work, such as Leprosy Mission Australia, delivering awareness, prevention, treatment and rehabilitation projects in Timor-Leste, Indonesia and Nepal.

=== Past projects ===
Past projects included bridging the Mekong River between Thailand and Laos with the First Thai–Lao Friendship Bridge, and reintroducing the Przewalski's Horse (a Mongolian national symbol which had become extinct in the wild) to the nation.

== See also ==
- ASEAN Australia Development Cooperation Program
- Australian Civilian Corps
- Developmental Leadership Program
- Philippines–Australia Community Assistance Program
