= H. M. Green (journalist) =

Australian journalist, librarian and literary historian

Henry Mackenzie Green (2 May 1881 – 9 September 1962) was an Australian journalist, librarian and literary historian born in Sydney.

In 1921 Green succeeded John Le Gay Brereton as librarian at the University of Sydney.

In 1944 he married Dorothy Auchterlonie.

His An Outline of Australian Literature was published in 1930 and Australian Literature 1900–1950 was published in 1951. His two-volume A History of Australian Literature Pure and Applied was first published by Angus & Robertson in 1961. It was reprinted, with corrections, in 1962. It was reprinted again in 1966, 1968, 1971 and 1974. A revised edition appeared in 1984.
