= Karl Weule =

German anthropologist and museum director (1864–1926)

Karl Weule (29 February 1864, in Alt-Wallmoden – 19 April 1926, in Leipzig) was a German geographer, ethnologist and museum director.

== Biography ==
Weule studied history, geography and German philology at the universities of Leipzig and Göttingen. In 1891, he moved to Berlin, where he served as assistant geographer to Ferdinand von Richthofen, followed by work as assistant to Adolf Bastian at the Ethnological Museum of Berlin. In 1899, he was appointed assistant director at the Leipzig Museum of Ethnography (Museum für Völkerkunde zu Leipzig).

In 1906, he traveled to German East Africa, where he made use of photography, cinematography and the phonograph for his ethnological research. In 1907, he returned to Germany and was appointed director of the Leipzig museum. The report about his travels and research was published in German in 1908 and the following year in English as Native life in East Africa; the results of an ethnological research expedition.

In 1914, he was named head of the ethnographic department and the anthropological research center at the University of Leipzig. In 1920, he became full professor, and in 1923/24, he became Dean of the Department of Philology and History at the Faculty of Philosophy in Leipzig.

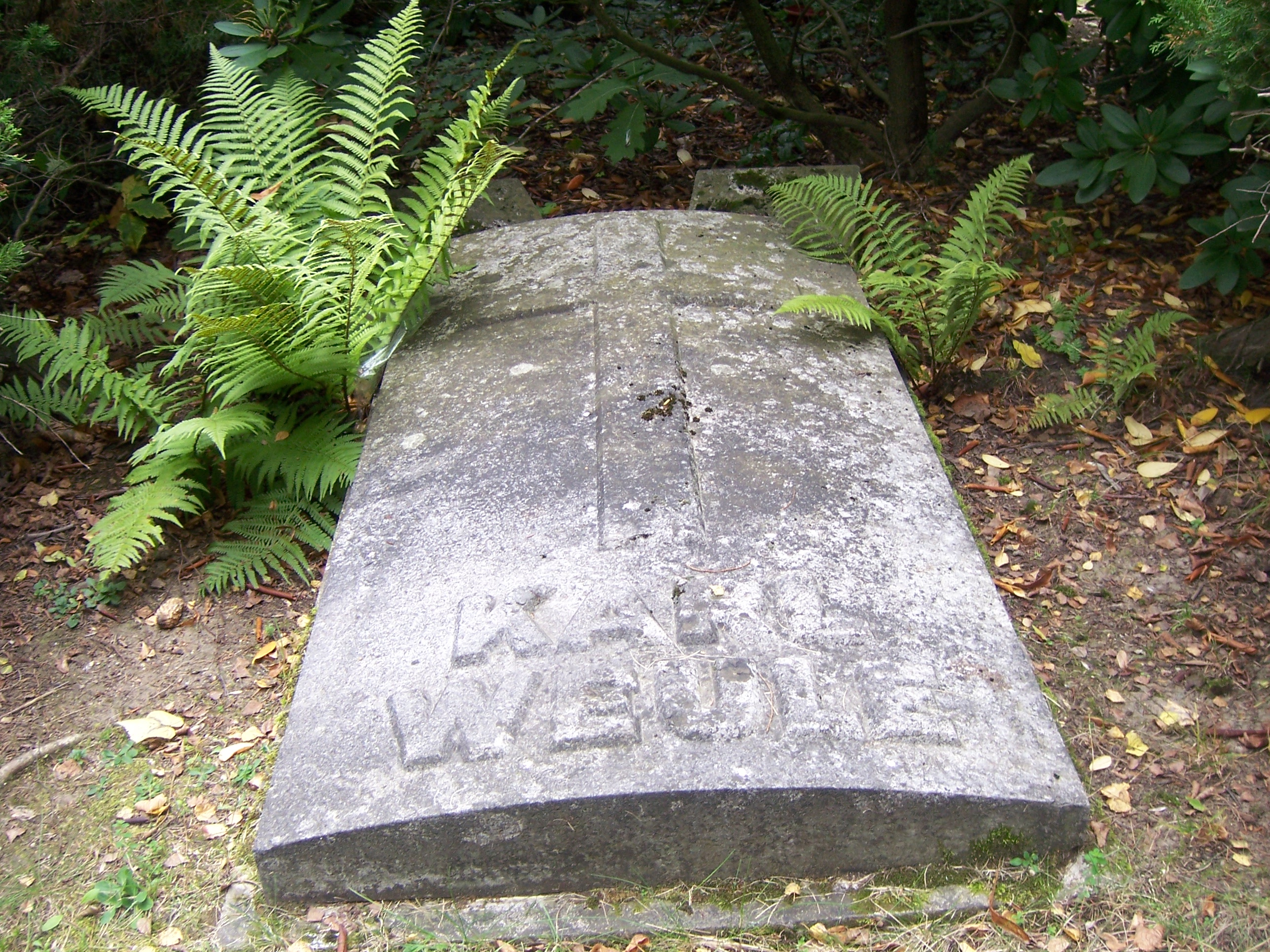
Grave of Karl Weule at the Südfriedhof in Leipzig

== Publications ==
- Der afrikanische Pfeil : eine anthropogeographische Studie, 1899 – The African arrow: an anthropogeographical study.
- Negerleben in Ostafrika. Ergebnisse einer ethnologischen Forschungsreise, 1908; Translated into English by Alice Werner as: "Native life in East Africa; the results of an ethnological research expedition" (1909).
- Die Kultur der Kulturlosen; ein Blick in die Anfänge menschlicher Geistesbetätigung, 1910 – The culture of the uncultured; A look at the beginnings of human mental activity.
- Leitfaden der Völkerkunde, 1912 – Guide to ethnology.
- Kulturelemente der Menschheit, Anfänge und Urformen der materiellen Kultur, 1910 – Cultural elements of humanity, beginnings and original forms of material culture.
- Die Urgesellschaft und ihre Lebensfürsorge, 1912 – The primitive society and its life maintenance.
- Vom Kerbstock zum Alphabet; Urformen der Schrift, 1915 – From the notched stick to the alphabet; Original forms of writing.
- Der Krieg in den Tiefen der Menschheit, 1916 – The war in the depths of humanity.
- Die Anfänge der Naturbeherrschung, 1921 – The beginnings involving the mastery of nature.
- Chemische Technologie der Naturvölker, 1922 – Chemical technology of primitive peoples.
