= Alfred Conlon =

Australian Directorate of Research and Civil Affairs (1908–1961)

Alf Conlon in 1937

Colonel Alfred Austin Joseph Conlon (7 October 1908 – 21 September 1961) was the head of the Australian Directorate of Research and Civil Affairs (DORCA) in World War II. A controversial figure, he influenced events throughout the Pacific region in the second half of the 20th century, through the Australian School of Pacific Administration (ASOPA), which grew out of the directorate.

== Career ==
Conlon's parents were Arthur George Conlon, tram conductor, and Esther Mary, née Hayes. He was born at East Sydney and was educated at Fort Street Boys' High School and the University of Sydney, graduating BA in 1931. He studied philosophy under the realist Professor John Anderson. He began to study medicine in 1932 at the University of Sydney but interrupted the course to work as a law clerk and get married (in January 1936). The following year he returned to his medical studies and represented undergraduates on the university's senate in 1939–43. He also served as a (military recruitment) manpower and education officer in 1940–41.

In April 1942, through a friend, the army's wartime adjutant-general Victor Stantke, Conlon became Major Conlon and head of the research section at the Australian Army’s headquarters, then at Victoria Barracks in St Kilda Road, Melbourne (which developed into the Army’s Directorate of Research and Civil Affairs). He had previously been chairman of the Prime Minister’s Committee on National Morale.

Described as "a clever man and a brilliant talker", "Svengali-like" and notorious, Conlon created the mysterious DORCA in part as a haven for artists and intellectuals to avoid repeating the slaughter of the best minds of a generation that had impoverished Australian culture in the First World War. Conlon was influenced by his first philosophy teacher, John Anderson, and by James Burnham's The Managerial Revolution, a book extolling the virtues of a bureaucratic meritocracy. Conlon feared a possible second war with Japan, and so envisioned a Southeast Asia of independent states that would provide a buffer between Japan and Australia. In line with this, he sought the de facto Australian governance of Brunei, North Borneo, and Sarawak to be converted to permanent Australian stewardship with the goal of independence, on the model of Papua and New Guinea. This was, however, opposed by the British representative Charles Macaskie, and never gained significant support.

Conlon was a charismatic figure, and had many friends in high places including H. V. Evatt and Herbert "Nugget" Coombs. He cultivated many contacts including Prime Minister John Curtin and General Thomas Blamey. In 1944, with Roy Wright, General Blamey and Howard Florey, Conlon developed the proposal for founding the John Curtin School of Medical Research. Conlon became principal of ASOPA after John Kerr's resignation in 1948.

He resumed his medical degree at the University of Sydney in 1950 and graduated MB, BS in 1951, "with difficulty, and despite opposition from members of the faculty". He subsequently practised as a psychiatrist from his home in North Sydney until his death at the age of 53.

== See also ==
- Directorate of Research and Civil Affairs
