= Developmental Leadership Program =

International research initiative

- Founded: July 2009
- Type: International organization
- Location: Birmingham, United Kingdom
- Region served: Worldwide
- Website: http://www.dlprog.org/

The Developmental Leadership Program (DLP, or DLPROG) is an international research and policy initiative. The Program looks at the political processes that underpin development goals such as sustainable economic growth, political stability and inclusive social development. In particular, DLP explores the central role of leaders, elites and coalitions in developing countries and how they can help or hinder the positive reform of institutions and policies in the public, private and civil society sectors. DLP is funded primarily by the Australian Aid Program.

== Background ==
=== The core aims and activities of DLP ===
The core aim of DLP is to develop a clearer understanding of the political processes that support developmental change and to embed that understanding in the thinking, policies and practices of the wider development community. DLP does this by:

- Undertaking, commissioning and publishing high quality, policy-relevant research.
- Organising international seminars and workshop sessions.
- Providing clear policy guidance, country-level operational guidance and political analysis tools for development practitioners and policy makers.

=== Central argument: politics is the key ===
- At the core of DLP’s work is the recognition that politics is central to the development process.
- Development is not just a technical challenge or a question or transferring information, skills or resources. These are important but it is also crucial that development is supported and sustained by local political agents and processes.
- Politics is understood by DLP in very broad terms, as all of the various activities of conflict, negotiation and co-operation that occur when people with different interests, ideas and degrees of influence have to make collective decisions about rules, resources and power.
- Politics occurs at all levels and in all sectors and organisations in society. It unfolds through formal rules and institutions but also informal norms, customs and understandings. Politics is the key to the peaceful management of differences and disagreements, from energy policy in China and India through to the informal networks that promote women’s rights in Egypt and Jordan.
- Leadership is central to politics and DLP aims to improve understanding of the role of leaders, elites and coalitions in promoting (or frustrating) inclusive political settlements, stable policies, sustainable economic growth and inclusive social development – particularly in the context of weak and fragile states.

== Organisational structure ==
DLP is run by a Program Management Team. While DLP's funding comes primarily from the Australian national government (DFAT), the Program is independent and autonomous. As of March 2021, DLP's management team consists of:

- David Hudson, International Development Department, University of Birmingham - Director
- Claire Mcloughlin, International Development Department, University of Birmingham - Deputy Director (Research)
- Chris Roche, Institute for Human Security and Social Change, La Trobe University, Melbourne - Deputy Director (Impact)
- Ujjwal Krishna, Institute for Human Security and Social Change, La Trobe University, Melbourne - Specialist Doctoral Research Scholar
- Isobel Wilson-Cleary, International Development Department, University of Birmingham - Deputy Director (Operations)
- Louisa Whitehouse, International Development Department, University of Birmingham - Administration and Finance Officer
- Robin Diver, International Development Department, University of Birmingham - Communications Officer

=== History ===
DLP has its origins in the work of the Leaders, Elites and Coalitions Research Program (LECRP), which began in 2007. It evolved into the Leadership Program: Developmental Leaders, Elites and Coalitions (LPDLEC) in 2009 before adopting its current form.

== Publications ==
DLP has published research on the following themes; activism, adaptive management, advocacy, agency, aid, climate change, coalitions, collective action, contestation, corruption, developmental leadership, education, elites, fragile states, gender, governance, growth, inequality, leadership, legitimacy, monitoring, evaluation and learning, networks, perceptions of leadership, political analysis, political settlements, politics, power, service delivery, state-building, thinking and working politically, values, and women's leadership.

DLP Publications can be viewed here https://www.dlprog.org/publications DLP Opinions can be viewed here https://www.dlprog.org/opinions
