= Ian Hogbin =

Australian anthropologist

Ian Hogbin

Dr Herbert Ian Priestley Hogbin (17 December 1904 – 2 August 1989) was a British-born Australian anthropologist. He conducted field work in the Solomon Islands and New Guinea.

== Biography ==
Ian Hogbin was born in Bawtry, Yorkshire, England in 1904.

Hogbin began his study of anthropology with Alfred Reginald Radcliffe-Brown, who founded the anthropology department at the University of Sydney, and his earliest field work was carried out under Radcliffe-Brown's supervision in Ontong Java, a Polynesian colony in the Solomon Islands. Some of the results were published in his book Law and Order in Polynesia.

He then went to London to work with Bronislaw Malinowski, at whose suggestion he returned to the Solomons, where he stayed in Guadalcanal and afterwards in Malaita. Subsequently, he made an investigation of the people of Wogeo, an island off the north coast of New Guinea. He earned a PhD from the University of London.

During World War II he served in the British Solomon Islands Protectorate Defence Force and later in the Australian Army in New Guinea as an adviser on native rehabilitation problems. He continued working in New Guinea, and, in 1963, published the second of two volumes on the Busama villagers, who occupied a settlement near the town of Lae.

He died at Potts Point, Sydney, Australia in 1989.

== Honours ==
The Royal Anthropological Institute of Great Britain awarded him the Wellcome Medal for a work in applied anthropology in 1944 and the Rivers Medal for field work in 1945. He delivered the Munro Lectures at the University of Edinburgh in 1949, the Josiah Mason Lectures at the University of Birmingham in 1953, and the Marett Memorial Lecture at Oxford in 1961. The University of Melbourne awarded two of his books (Transformation Scene and Social Change) the Harbison-Higinbotham Prize.

== Books ==
- Law and Order in Polynesia: A Study of Primitive Legal Institution, 1934
- Social Advancement in Guadalcanal, Solomon Islands, 1938
- Development and Welfare in the Western Pacific, 1944
- Transformation Scene, 1951
- Social Change, 1958
- Kinship and Marriage in a New Guinea Village, 1963
- A Guadalcanal Society: The Kaoka Speakers, 1964
- Studies in New Guinea Land Tenure, 1967 (with Peter Lawrence)
- The Island of Menstruating Men: Religion in Wogeo, New Guinea, 1970 (Reissued Long Grove, IL: Waveland Press, 1996)
