= Cliff Turney =

Australian academic

Cliff Turney (1932 – 18 March 2005) was an Australian educationalist. He was foundation Dean of Education at the University of Sydney. He was a researcher who in thirty-five years managed to catalogue much of Australia's history of Education. As an administrator he oversaw the merging of Sydney Teachers College with the University of Sydney Faculty of Education.

== Career ==
Turney graduated from Fort Street High School in 1949. At the time, Fort Street was an academically highly ranked school in NSW.

His choice of Primary education, which in NSW is from ages five to eleven, or grades kindergarten to year six, did not lack academic rigor. His ability to teach was recognized early, and he was appointed to Haberfield Demonstration School in 1953. Demonstration schools were places where Universities and Colleges of Advanced Education would send their students to witness teacher praxis. Turney's efforts were further recognized as he was appointed lecturer in Education at Sydney's Teacher's College and made Commonwealth Research Scholar in 1956.

Teachers in NSW, at the time, did not require a university degree to teach. After nine years of teaching, Turney enrolled at Sydney University, graduating with first class honors for his BA, then first class honors for his M.Ed. In 1964, Turney enrolled in a Ph.D. program for a study in the history of early educational endeavour. Part of his post doctoral work examined the history of Education in Australia.

Turney was appointed Senior Lecturer at Sydney University in 1966, and Associate Professor in 1973. By 1976, Turney was appointed Professor of Education 'head of the School of Teaching and Curriculum Studies.' During the early seventies, Turney had edited and co-authored the Sydney Micro Skills Handbook and its accompanying videos. Part of a national re-evaluation of teaching and teacher education, these publications had a major influence on practice in teacher education, in Australia and internationally:

Series 1 Handbook - Reinforcement, Basic Questioning, Variability
Series 2 Handbook - Explaining, Introductory Procedures and Closure, Advanced Questioning
Series 3 Handbook - Classroom Management and Discipline
Series 4 Handbook - Guiding Small Group Discussion, Small Group Teaching and Individualized Instruction

A restructure of the Education Sector in 1986 had Sydney University promote its Education Department to a full Faculty. The Department had had more researchers than other faculties. Also, Sydney College of Education merged with the faculty. Turney was foundation Dean during this time.

In 1994, with failing health, Turney was made Emeritus Professor Education. He continued his research, and in 2003 was awarded the Sydney University Honorary Doctorate of Letters. He died in 2005, survived by his wife, Roslyn, and two daughters, Jennifer and Catherine.

== Selected bibliography ==
- Pioneers of Australian Education edited and contributor
- 1989 Grammar: The History of Sydney Grammar School
- History of the University of Sydney, Australia's First
- History of Sydney Teachers College
- History of Teacher Education at Balmain and Kuring-gai Colleges
- William Wilkins: His Life and Work
- Cliff Turney and Judy Taylor, To Enlighten Them Our Task, Sydmac Academic Press, 1996
- The Classroom Manager
