= Michael Bryce =

Australian architect (1938–2021)

Michael Bryce AM AE FRSA
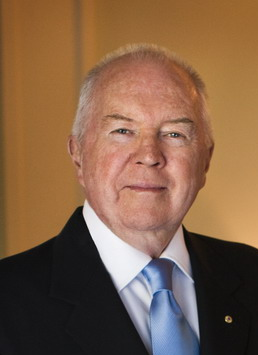
- Bryce c. 2008

Spouse of the governor-general of Australia
- In office 5 September 2008 – 28 March 2014
- Monarch: Elizabeth II
- Governor General: Dame Quentin Bryce
- Preceded by: Marlena Jeffery
- Succeeded by: Lynne, Lady Cosgrove

Personal details
- Born: Michael John Strachan Bryce; 7 November 1938 Brisbane, Queensland, Australia
- Died: 15 January 2021 (aged 82) Queensland, Australia
- Spouse: Quentin Strachan (m. 1964)
- Relations: Bill Shorten (son-in-law)
- Children: 5, including Chloe
- Education: University of Queensland (B. Arch.)
- Occupation: Royal Australian Air Force (RAAF) Reservist; Architect and graphic designer Vice-regal husband

Michael John Strachan Bryce, AM, AE, FRSA, (21 June 1938 – 15 January 2021) was an Australian architect and graphic and industrial designer. He was the husband of the 25th governor-general of Australia, Dame Quentin Bryce.

== Early life and career ==
Michael Bryce was born in Brisbane, Queensland, and attended Gordonvale State School in north Queensland, and Brisbane State High School. He gained a Bachelor of Architecture degree from the University of Queensland in 1962. He returned to Australia and started an architecture practice in 1968. His practice won awards for graphic and environmental design, including the Civic Design Award, the Australian Institute of Architects (RAIA) House of the Year Award, and the RAIA President's Award. The practice also received citations in the RAIA, DIA and AGDA awards, as well as the Honor Award of the United States Society of Environmental Graphic Design.

In 1988, Bryce joined his practice with those of Marcello Minale and Brian Tattersfield in London to form Minale Tattersfield Bryce and Partners. In 1998 he was a member of the judging panel for a design competition for an alternative National Australian Flag, run by Ausflag. He was principal design adviser to the Sydney 2000 Olympic Games, personally designing the stylised "Opera House" Olympic bid logo, and advising on the application of the corporate branding. His later firm, Minale Bryce, does graphic and industrial designing.

Among his other designs and clients have been:

- signage for the Brisbane 1982 Commonwealth Games
- the Brisbane bid for the 1992 Olympic Games
- the Dolphins (Australian swimming team)
- PGA Tour (golf)
- the logo for the Wallabies rugby union team
- the International Cricket Council (logo for the 2007 Cricket World Cup)
- Oceania Football
- the ringtail possum logo for the Queensland Parks and Wildlife Service
- the logo for the Government of Queensland (sometimes referred to as the "Beattie-burger")
- Harrods, London
- fashion brands Fendi and Valentino
- San Pellegrino
- FA Premier League
- Rhône-Poulenc
- Bluewater, Kent
- the Eurostar train
- Sydney Airport
- Doha Stadium.

In 1977 Bryce was elected inaugural Queensland president of the Design Institute of Australia and federal president in 1979. He was a life fellow of the institute, a life fellow of the Royal Australian Institute of Architects, and a fellow of the Royal Society of Arts.

Bryce was appointed an adjunct professor of design at the Queensland College of Art (Griffith University), the School of Design and Architecture at the University of Canberra and the College of Fine Arts at the University of New South Wales.

Bryce retired from Minale Bryce in September 2008, following his wife's appointment as Governor-General of Australia. The day after her swearing-in, he announced he would be selling his design practice in order to avoid "any breath of conflict of interests".

In 2010 Bryce became Patron of the Australian Institute of Architects.

== Other activities and interests ==
At university, Bryce joined the Royal Australian Air Force Reserve as a member of the Queensland University Squadron, and later joined the No. 23 (City of Brisbane) Squadron. While with the RAAF Reserve he was appointed as honorary Aide-de-Camp to the governor of Queensland. He was a former patron of the Royal Australian Air Force Association in Queensland, a trustee of the Queensland Art Gallery and a member of the boards of the Queensland Symphony Orchestra and Queensland Orchestra. He served as a ministerial adviser on the Child Accident Prevention Foundation and as the founding president of Melanoma Patients Australia.

== Personal life ==
Bryce married Quentin Strachan on 12 December 1964; the couple had two daughters and three sons.

Bryce died on 15 January 2021, aged 82, after a long illness.

== Honours ==
In 2003, Bryce was conferred with the degree of doctor of the university honoris causa by the University of Canberra. He was honoured by Indesign Magazine as a luminary. In 2006, he was inducted into the Design Institute of Australia Hall of Fame.

Member of the Order of Australia (AM)	12 June 2006
Knight of the Order of St John	2003
National Medal	for 15 years national service
Australian Defence Medal	2006
Anniversary of National Service 1951–1972 Medal	
Air Efficiency Award (AE)	1970

== See also ==
- Spouse of the Governor-General of Australia

== Sources ==
- Governor-General of the Commonwealth of Australia
- Government House, Queensland
- ABC Queensland
- Singh, Shivani (2010). Who's Who in Australia 2010. Melbourne: Crown Content. ISBN 978-1-74095-172-2. OCLC 501818530.
