= Hersey Hope, Marchioness of Linlithgow =

British aristocrat

The Most Honourable The Marchioness of Linlithgow
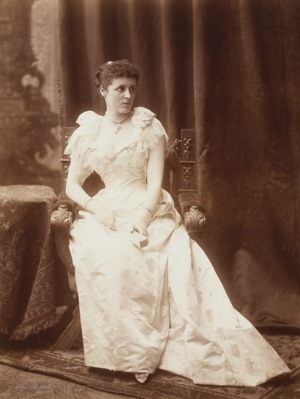

Spouse of the governor-general of Australia
- In office 1 January 1901 – 9 January 1903
- Monarchs: Victoria; Edward VII
- Governor General: Lord Hopetoun
- Preceded by: New position
- Succeeded by: Audrey, Lady Tennyson

Personal details
- Born: Hersey Alice Mullins; 31 March 1867 Edinburgh, Scotland
- Died: 3 April 1937 (aged 70)
- Spouse: John Hope, 1st Marquess of Linlithgow (m. 1886; died 1908)
- Children: Victor Hope, 2nd Marquess of Linlithgow; Lord Charles Hope; Lady Jacqueline Hope; Mary Herbert, Countess of Pembroke
- Parents: Dayrolles Eveleigh-de-Moleyns, 4th Baron Ventry; Harriet Wauchope

Hersey Alice Hope, Marchioness of Linlithgow (née Mullins, later Eveleigh-de Moleyns; 31 March 1867 – 3 April 1937) was a British aristocrat, who was the wife of John Hope, 1st Marquess of Linlithgow, who, as the 7th Earl of Hopetoun, was the first Governor-General of Australia 1901 – 1903.

== Biography ==
Hersey Alice Mullins was born in Edinburgh, Scotland, the third daughter and sixth child of nine children of Dayrolles Blakeney Mullins and Harriet Elizabeth Frances, née Wauchope, of Niddrie Marischal. On 18 January 1868 her father succeeded to the titles of 4th Baronet Mullins and 4th Baron Ventry. On 3 November 1874, when she was seven, the family surname was legally changed to Eveleigh-de Moleyns by Royal Licence.

Her family had lived in County Kerry in Ireland since the 17th century, and her father was Deputy Lieutenant there. She grew up at Burnham House, County Kerry (now an Irish-speaking girls' secondary school known as Coláiste Ide) as well as at Ennismore Gardens, Knightsbridge, London. Their neighbours in London were the 6th Earl of Hopetoun and his family. In 1873 the 6th Earl died and was succeeded by his son John Adrian Louis Hope as the 7th Earl. On 18 October 1886, at age 19, at All Saints' Church, Ennismore Gardens, she married the 7th Earl of Hopetoun.

Their son Victor (known as "Hopie"), was born on 24 September 1887 (he later succeeded his father as 2nd Marquess of Linlithgow). In 1889, her husband was appointed Governor of Victoria, and they arrived in Melbourne on 28 November. Lord Hopetoun was popular with Victorians, but Lady Hopetoun, then aged 22, had no experience of public life, was painfully shy, and was criticised for her reserved and haughty manner. She had been ill since the birth of her son and at the end of 1890 she returned to England for medical advice. She returned in May 1891, and soon became pregnant again. Their second son, Lord Charles (Melbourne) Hope, was born on 20 February 1892.

The torpedo gunboat HMVS Countess of Hopetoun was named after her in 1890. It was incorporated into the Royal Australian Navy in 1911 as HMAS Countess of Hopetoun and was used until 1924. It was later wrecked in the vicinity of Swan Island in Port Phillip. In 1902 a steam launch was named after her, the Lady Hopetoun; it is still operational, as part of the Sydney Heritage Fleet.

Lady Hopetoun's private character was less formal than her public one. She was a keen angler, an expert horsewoman (once breaking her nose in a riding accident), and an enthusiastic hunter. She was also a crack shot, even though shooting was then considered an unusual activity for a woman, and disapproved of by Queen Victoria. She was also a photographer and an artist in cartoons, caricatures, and watercolours.

The Hopetouns left Australia in March 1895 when his term as Governor of Victoria ended. Another daughter, Lady Jacqueline Hope, was born on 16 June 1896, but she survived only five days. They returned in 1900 when Lord Hopetoun was appointed the first Governor-General of Australia. They arrived in Sydney on 15 December 1900. Their voyage to Australia on this occasion was marred by her contracting malaria during a stopover in India, where her husband also contracted typhoid fever. The festivities for the inauguration of the Commonwealth of Australia on 1 January 1901 included a song "Welcome to the Earl and Countess of Hopetoun", with words by Joan Torrance and music by W. R. Furlong, which was dedicated to her husband.

On 3 September 1901, at the Royal Exhibition Building in Melbourne, the Countess of Hopetoun announced the names of the winners of a competition to design the Australian Flag, and unfurled the new flag for the first time.

Lord Hopetoun resigned the governor-generalship in May 1902. They left Australia (from Brisbane) on 17 July, and on 27 October (while still formally occupying the position of Governor-General) he was created the 1st Marquess of Linlithgow, and she became the Marchioness of Linlithgow.

In 1903, a daughter, Mary Dorothea, was born.

The Marquess died suddenly in France in 1908. Their elder son, Victor, succeeded his father as the 2nd Marquess, and later became the Viceroy of India 1936-43, after having declined the governorship of Madras and the governor-generalship of Australia.

The Dowager Marchioness of Linlithgow died on 3 April 1937, three days after turning 70.

== Children ==
- Victor Alexander John Hope, 2nd Marquess of Linlithgow (24 September 1887 – 5 January 1952)
- Lord Charles Melbourne Hope (20 February 1892 – 11 June 1962)
- Lady Jacqueline Alice Hope (16 June 1896 – 21 June 1896)
- Lady Mary Dorothea Hope (1903–16 January 1995); 1936 married the 16th Earl of Pembroke

== See also ==
- Spouse of the Governor-General of Australia

== Sources ==
- Dictionary of Australian Artists Online
