= Queensland University Regiment =

- Cap badge of the Queensland University Regiment
- Active: 1932–present
- Country: Australia
- Branch: Army Reserve
- Type: Training establishment
- Role: Army Reserve officer training
- Part of: 8th Brigade
- Garrison/HQ: St Lucia
- Colours: Slate grey and scarlet
- March: "Pour Bacchus"

Commanders
- Honorary Colonel: Major General Dennis Luttrell AO, RFD, ED

Queensland University Regiment (QUR) is a training unit of the Australian Army Reserve. Based in Queensland, the regiment is currently assigned to the 8th Brigade. The regiment's history can be traced back to 1932 when the University Rifles was formed. During World War II, the regiment's predecessor unit did not serve overseas, but many of its personnel were deployed as part of the 7th Brigade or within units of the Second Australian Imperial Force. After the war, the regiment was formed under its current designation. Since then, its size has fluctuated as its role has changed. Currently, it is responsible for providing training for Reserve officer cadets, officers and soldiers.

== Role and organisation ==
The regiment is headquartered at the University of Queensland's St Lucia campus in Brisbane. Staffed by a cadre of Regular Army personnel, it is tasked with training officers and soldiers of the Army Reserve and currently provides pre-appointment training for officer cadets for 11th Brigade units, as well as promotion courses for all Reserve officers up to the rank of major. The regiment also provides driver and initial employment training courses for reserve soldiers across the Second Division.

The regiment currently consists of the following sub-units:

- Regimental Headquarters (RHQ) – St Lucia with support staff also at Enoggera
- Soldier Training Company – Enoggera
- Officer Cadet Company – St Lucia
- Officer Training Team – Enoggera

QUR conducts field training at the Enoggera Close Training Area (ECTA), Greenbank Training Area (GBTA), Wide Bay Training Area (WBTA), High Range Training Area (HRTA) and Canungra.

== History ==
QUR was initially formed in 1932 as the "University Rifles" by two UQ graduates – Captain Thomas Fry and Lieutenant James Mahoney – who were officers of the Citizens Military Forces. Fry had been serving in the 9th/15th Battalion (the Oxley Regiment) and Mahoney had served in the 26th Battalion (the Logan and Albert Regiment). Previously university students had to complete their compulsory military training other units of the Citizens Military Forces, and the university had a long tradition of its members serving in the military. The University of Queensland was unable to raise enough men to form an entire unit, with its total strength only several hundred men. As a consequence in 1933 university sub-units were attached to existing militia units, with the first platoon attached to the 9th/15th Battalion (Moreton and Oxley Regiment). In 1935, the 9th/15th was delinked and the university platoon became part of the 9th Battalion. The following year the detachment was raised to two platoons and the 9th Battalion was linked with the 49th Battalion; they subsequently remained linked until 1941.

During World War II the 9th Battalion, along with the rest of the 7th Brigade was sent to New Guinea to help stem the tide of the Japanese advance. At the Battle of Milne Bay a number of university men played an instrumental part in the first major Allied land victory in the Pacific. One of these was Mahoney who served as the brigade major and was mentioned in despatches, while Captain Jack Kelly served as adjutant of the 9th Battalion and Captain Murray Brown served in the 2/10th Battalion. Lieutenant Ron Dark, the first man to gain a commission through the university detachment, also served along the Kokoda Track with the 2/33rd. Later in the war, the 9th Battalion took part in the Bougainville campaign in 1944–45 where it took part in significant actions at Pearl Ridge, Artillery Ridge and along the Numa Numa Trail. In all, throughout the war, a total of 120 men who had previously served in the university detachment were killed. Their names were later inscribed upon the Forgan Smith Building in the university grounds.

In May 1948 QUR was formed, initially as an independent company designated as 'A' Company. An increased number of recruits arrived in 1950 and as a result in May that year the regiment was established as a full infantry battalion. This resulted in the raising of Support Company, consisting of Mortar, Medium Machine Gun and Assault Pioneer Platoons. An Anti-Tank Platoon was later added. Later the following year the regiment began training members to receive commissions as officers; the first member to graduate was Second Lieutenant Pat Shanahan. QUR was presented Queens and Regimental Colours on 19 July 1959 by His Excellency, The Governor of Queensland, Colonel Sir Henry Abel Smith. By the end of the 1950s the role of officer training became the focus of the regiment's existence.

Following the end of the national service scheme resulted in a reduction in the number of parading members and as a result during the early 1960s regimental strength was no more than 160 at any given time. Following the re-establishment of the scheme in late 1964 following the commitment of Australian troops to South Vietnam, the regiment's ranks swelled and by late 1965 the regiment had a frontage of 438 personnel. This trend continued and by mid-1967 the regimental strength was 40 officers and 603 other ranks. At that time the regiment was made responsible for providing officers to all Northern Command units and was tasked with delivering training over the course of a two-year cycle; under this model 'A' Company took over the role of recruit training while 'B' Company became the officer training company. The end of the national service scheme in 1972 resulted in a sharp decline in the regiment's strength; 92 personnel remained at the end of the year. Two years later there were only 37.

During the 1974 Brisbane flood caused by Cyclone Wanda the regiment's depot in Walcott Street was damaged as were the regimental colours. The regiment was still able to mount an annual camp, however, further declining numbers resulted in discussions about disbanding the regiment. These were put off, although the regiment's existence continued to be tenuous as it was only able to graduate three officers in 1975 and two more the following year. That year women were officially permitted to join the regiment in support roles and after this the regiment began to recover.

A major focus of the next two years was the recruitment and training of enough soldiers to put together a creditable parade for the presentation of new Queen's and Regimental Colours, which occurred on 9 July 1978. The colours were presented by Governor-General Sir Zelman Cowen, who had recently been the Vice-Chancellor of Queensland University. These replaced the old colours that had been damaged four years earlier, which were subsequently laid up in Emmanuel College Chapel located at the University of Queensland.

By 1982 the regiment had grown once more to about 600 members as it had begun recruiting from a number of different universities including Griffith University, the Queensland Institute of Technology and the Brisbane College of Advance Education. Two years later, the regiment consisted of a regimental headquarters, two rifle companies, a training company, support company (mortars, signals, demonstration and employment platoons and intelligence section), and an administration company, with an authorised strength of 540 personnel. On 12 July 1986 the regiment exercised the Freedom to Enter the City of Brisbane and paraded before the Lord Mayor Sallyanne Atkinson; later that year it exercised for the first time in Shoalwater Bay, deploying by air. The late 1980s saw a period of change as the regiment lost its mortar and machine-gun platoons and the way in which officer training was delivered in the regiment was changed. Instead of having officer trainees serve in the ranks and then as NCOs prior to commissioning a new system required such members to be "appointed" as officer cadets. This resulted in a reduction in the number of soldiers and NCOs in the regiment and the requirement to establish a new mess.

In 1992 the regiment's role became solely focused upon officer training when it became part of the 1st Officer Training Unit (OCTU). It was restructured at this time to consist of a regimental headquarters, an administration company and an officer training company. Changes in the way in which officer training was delivered resulted in a modular system that saw the regiment's involvement in the delivery of courses reduce during this time, and as a result the regimental began detaching personnel to instructional roles at places like the Royal Military College, Duntroon, the Land Warfare Centre and the School of Infantry in Singleton. During the early 1990s a number of former QUR personnel were involved in Australian peacekeeping operations in Cambodia, Rwanda, Bougainville and East Timor. Other members took part in the Gulf War.

In 1996 and 1997 OCTU and the Regional University Regiment of Queensland (RURQ), formally based at Gatton were disbanded and their role subsumed by QUR. As a result, for a while QUR maintained a detachment at Gatton. In 1997 all the University Regiments were brigaded under the Royal Military College, Duntroon. In October 2000 the formerly independent North Queensland Company came under the command of the Regiment. In July 2008 all University Regiments became part of the 2nd Division, with QUR being assigned to the 11th Brigade. Later, in 2017–18, all University Regiments, including QUR, were moved under the command of a dedicated training formation, the 8th Brigade.

== Prominent former members ==
- Governor and former Chief Justice P. de Jersey, AC
- Justice John Byrne, AO, RFD
- Colonel Michael Kingsford, CSC
- Terry Gygar, RFD
- Wayne Barclay

== See also ==
- University of Queensland
- Queensland University Squadron (RAAF unit, now disbanded)
