= Victor Hope, 2nd Marquess of Linlithgow =

British politician and statesman (1887–1952)

The Most Honourable The Marquess of Linlithgow KG KT GCSI GCIE OBE KStJ TD PC FRSE
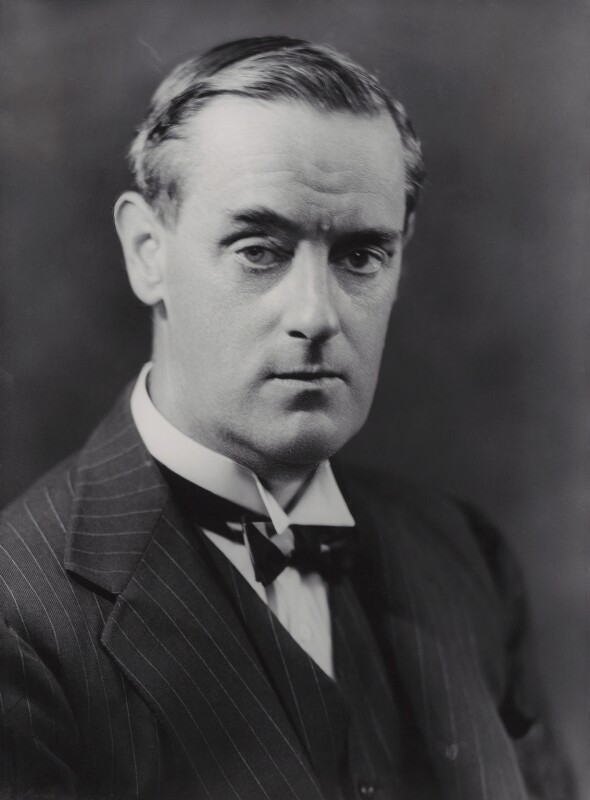
- Linlithgow in 1935

Viceroy and Governor-General of India
- In office 18 April 1936 – 1 October 1943
- Monarchs: Edward VIII; George VI
- Prime Minister: Stanley Baldwin; Neville Chamberlain; Winston Churchill
- Preceded by: The Marquess of Willingdon
- Succeeded by: The Viscount Wavell

Personal details
- Born: 24 September 1887 South Queensferry, Linlithgowshire, Scotland
- Died: 5 January 1952 (aged 64) South Queensferry, Linlithgowshire, Scotland
- Spouse: Doreen Milner (m. 1911)
- Children: Charles Hope, 3rd Marquess of Linlithgow; John Hope, 1st Baron Glendevon; Lady Anne Southby; Lady Joan Gore-Langton; Lady Doreen Prior-Palmer
- Parents: John Hope, 1st Marquess of Linlithgow (father); Hersey Everleigh-de-Moleyns (mother)
- Education: Ludgrove School; Eton College
- Occupation: Politician; agriculturalist; colonial administrator
- Military career
- Allegiance: United Kingdom
- Branch: British Army
- Service years: 1914–1918
- Rank: Colonel
- Units: Lothians and Border Horse; Royal Scots
- Conflicts: World War I; Western Front

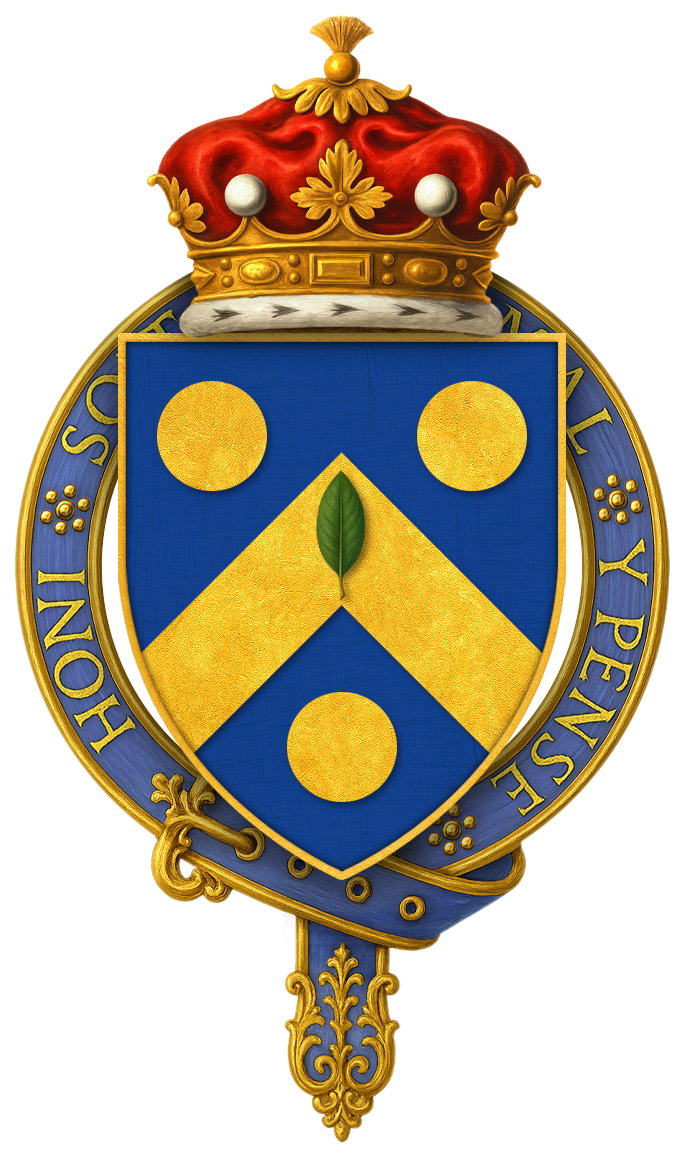
Garter-encircled shield of arms of Victor Hope, 2nd Marquess of Linlithgow, KG, KT, FRSE, GCSI, GCIE, OBE

Victor Alexander John Hope, 2nd Marquess of Linlithgow, KG, KT, GCSI, GCIE, OBE, TD, PC, FRSE (24 September 1887 – 5 January 1952) was a British Unionist politician and statesman, agriculturalist, and colonial administrator. He served as Governor-General and Viceroy of India from 1936 to 1943. He also served as vice president of the Royal Society of Edinburgh, Chancellor of the University of Edinburgh and Lord High Commissioner to the General Assembly of the Church of Scotland. He was usually referred to as Lord Linlithgow, or simply Linlithgow.

== Early life and family ==
Hope was born at Hopetoun House, South Queensferry, Linlithgowshire, Scotland, on 24 September 1887.

He was the eldest son of John Adrian Louis Hope, 7th Earl of Hopetoun, later 1st Marquess Linlithgow, and Hersey Everleigh-de-Moleyns, Countess of Hopetoun and later Marchioness of Linlithgow, daughter of the fourth Baron Ventry. His godmother was Queen Victoria.

He was educated at Ludgrove School and Eton College and on 29 February 1908 succeeded his father as 2nd Marquess of Linlithgow.

In 1912, aged only 25, he was elected a Fellow of the Royal Society of Edinburgh. His proposers were William Turner, Alexander Crum Brown, Cargill Gilston Knott and James Haig Ferguson. He served as the society's vice president from 1934 to 1937.

== Early career ==
Linlithgow served as an officer on the Western Front during the First World War. Transferred from Lothians and Border Horse, he commanded a battalion of the Royal Scots. He was mentioned in dispatches and appointed an Officer of the Order of the British Empire, ending the war with the rank of colonel.

He then served in various minor roles in the Conservative governments of the 1920s and '30s. From 1922 till 1924 he served as the civil lord of the Admiralty, becoming chairman of the Unionist Party Organisation in 1924 for two years. He also served as president of the Navy League from 1924 until 1931. He was chairman of the Medical Research Council and of the governing body of the Imperial College London. Linlithgow was also chairman of the committee on the distribution and prices of agricultural produce and president of the Edinburgh and East of Scotland College of Agriculture until 1933. In 1926 he was chairman of the Royal Commission on Agriculture in India, which published its findings in 1928. Influenced by submissions to the Royal Commission, "a decade later, when (he) became Viceroy of India he showed a personal interest in nutrition, pushing it to the top of the research agenda". The reason for sending a Commission on Agriculture under Linlithgow was 'because constitutional reform without economic and educational reform will do nothing to ameliorate the condition of life of the mass of the population of India, and this is what matters most.'

From April 1933 to November 1934 he was chairman of the Parliamentary Joint Select Committee on Indian constitutional reform, drawn up to consider the proposals for Indian self-government contained in the government's March 1933 White Paper. He agreed to take the job after Lord Salisbury declined it (although he agreed to serve on the committee) and Sidney Peel, the second choice, fell ill with phlebitis. Linlithgow told the Joint Select Committee that he would show no favouritism between the Indian factions (Hindus, Muslims and Princely States) and would be neutral just as he was between his own five children. The committee's proposals became the Government of India Act 1935.

== Viceroy ==
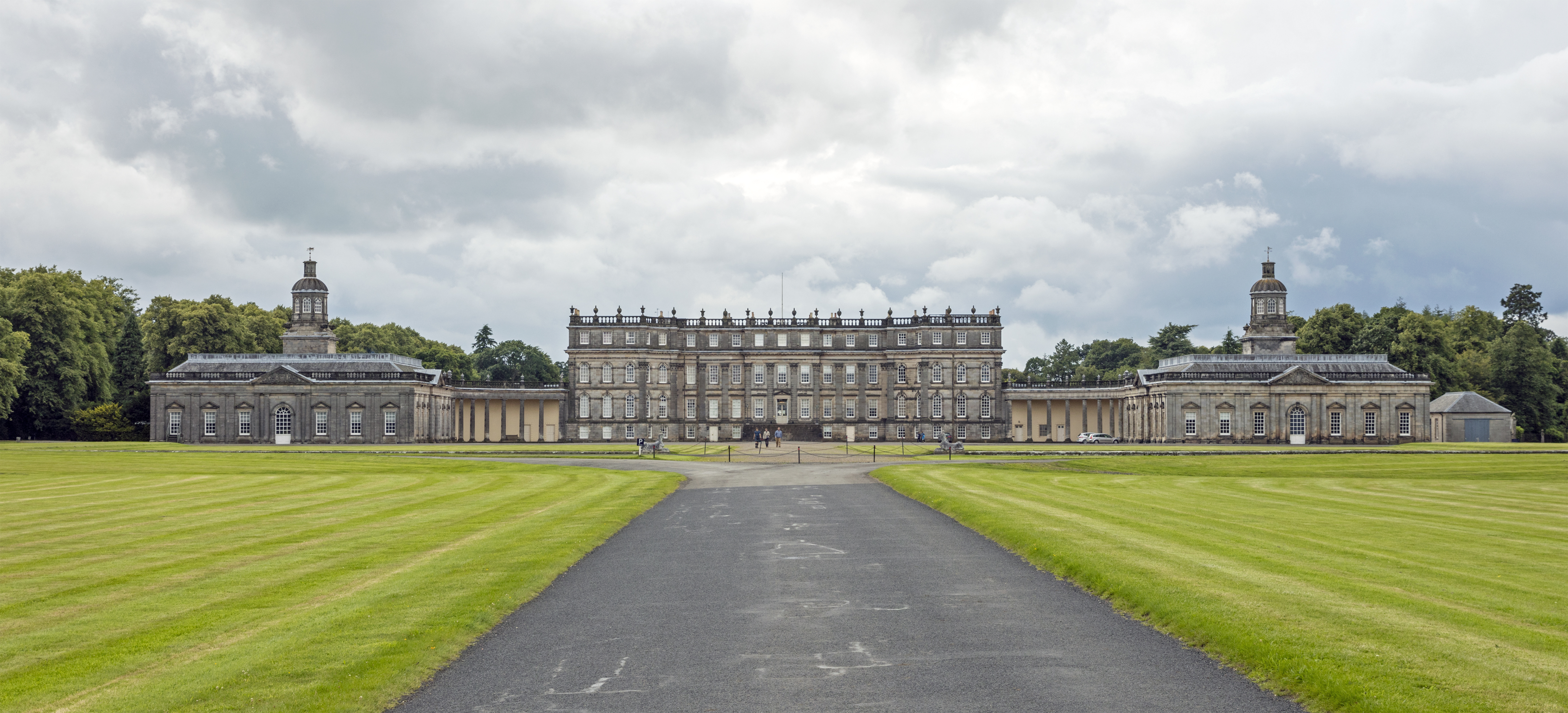
Hopetoun House

Having previously declined both the governorship of Madras and the governor-generalship of Australia (his father was the first Governor-General of Australia), he became the Viceroy of India, succeeding Lord Willingdon. Travelling out to India on the P&O liner RMS Strathmore, he arrived in Bombay, with his wife, daughters, and personal staff, on 17 April 1936. Linlithgow implemented the plans for local self-government embodied in the Government of India Act 1935, which led to provincial governments led by the Congress Party in five of the eleven provinces of British India, but the recalcitrance of the princes prevented the establishment of elected governments in most of the princely states.

With the outbreak of the Second World War, Linlithgow's rejection of the request by the Congress for a declaration that India would be given the chance to determine its own future after the war led to the resignation of the Congress ministries. He declared India to be at war with Germany in September 1939, without consulting Indian politicians. On 8 August 1940 Lord Linlithgow made a statement on behalf of the British government. It was known as the August Offer and offered greater rights in the governance of India to the Indian people. The proposal was rejected by most Indian politicians, including the Congress Party and the Muslim League. Disputes between the British administration and Congress ultimately led to massive Indian civil disobedience in the Quit India Movement. Linlithgow suppressed the disturbances and arrested the Congress leaders. Some historians have partly blamed Linlithgow for the Bengal famine of 1943 which resulted in three million deaths.

== Retirement ==
His seven-year tenure as viceroy, the longest in the history of the Raj, ended on 1 October 1943, succeeded by Field Marshal Lord Wavell who had been Commander-in-Chief, India since January 1942.

Indians were not kind in their assessments of his career. V. P. Menon in The Transfer of Power in India stated: "His 7½ year regime – longer than that of any other Viceroy – was conspicuous by its lack of positive achievement. When he left India, famine stalked portions of the countryside. There was economic distress due to the rising cost of living and the shortage of essential commodities. On the political side, Sir Tej Bahadur Sapru expressed the general feeling thus: 'Today, I say, after seven years of Lord Linlithgow's administration the country is much more divided than it was when he came here'."

A sincere Presbyterian, he served as Lord High Commissioner to the Church of Scotland in 1944 and 1945. He died in 1952.

== Honours ==

Ribbon	Description	Notes
	Order of the Garter	Appointed Knight Companion (KG) in 1943
	Order of the Thistle	Appointed Knight (KT) in 1928 Birthday Honours
	Order of the Star of India	Appointed Knight Grand Commander (GCSI) in 1936
	Order of the Indian Empire	Appointed Knight Grand Commander (GCIE)
	Order of the British Empire	Appointed Officer (OBE)
	Order of Saint John	Appointed Knight of Grace (KStJ); Appointed Knight of Justice (KStJ) in 1906
	1914 Star	1917
	British War Medal	1919
	Victory Medal	With mention in dispatches oak leaf
	King George V Silver Jubilee Medal	6 May 1935
	King George VI Coronation Medal	12 May 1937
	Territorial Decoration	(TD)

== Family ==
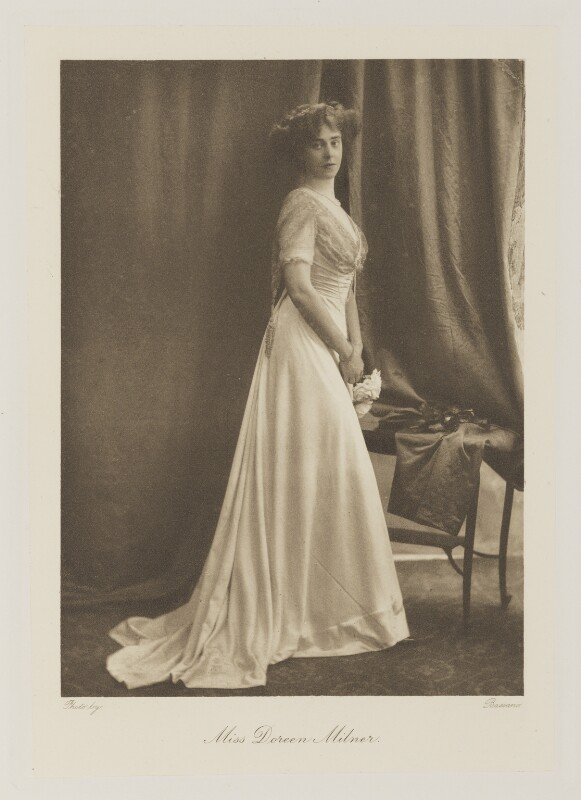
Doreen Maud Hope (née Milner), Marchioness of Linlithgow, published 1909

On 19 April 1911 he married Doreen Maud Milner (1886–1965), the younger daughter of Sir Frederick Milner. They had twin sons and three daughters:

- Charles William Frederick Hope, 3rd Marquess of Linlithgow (7 April 1912 – 1987); succeeded to his father's marquessate
- John Adrian Louis Hope, 1st Baron Glendevon (7 April 1912 – 18 January 1996); became a Conservative statesman and married the daughter of the English novelist W. Somerset Maugham
- Lady Anne Adeline (27 January 1914 – 2007)
- Lady Joan Isabella (21 September 1915 – 1989)
- Lady Doreen Hersey Winifred (17 June 1920 – 22 January 1997), the mother of Lucinda Green, a famous equestrian.

In some circles the three girls were known as Faint Hope, Little Hope, and No Hope.

Government offices
Preceded by The Earl of Willingdon	Viceroy of India; 1936–1943	Succeeded by The Viscount Wavell
Honorary titles
Preceded by The Earl of Rosebery	Lord Lieutenant of West Lothian; 1929–1952	Succeeded by Henry Moubray Cadell
Academic offices
Preceded by Baron Tweedsmuir	Chancellor of the University of Edinburgh; 1946–1952	Succeeded by The Duke of Edinburgh
Peerage of the United Kingdom
Preceded by John Adrian Louis Hope	Marquess of Linlithgow; 1908–1952	Succeeded by Charles William Frederick Hope
