= Chloe Shorten =

Australian corporate affairs specialist

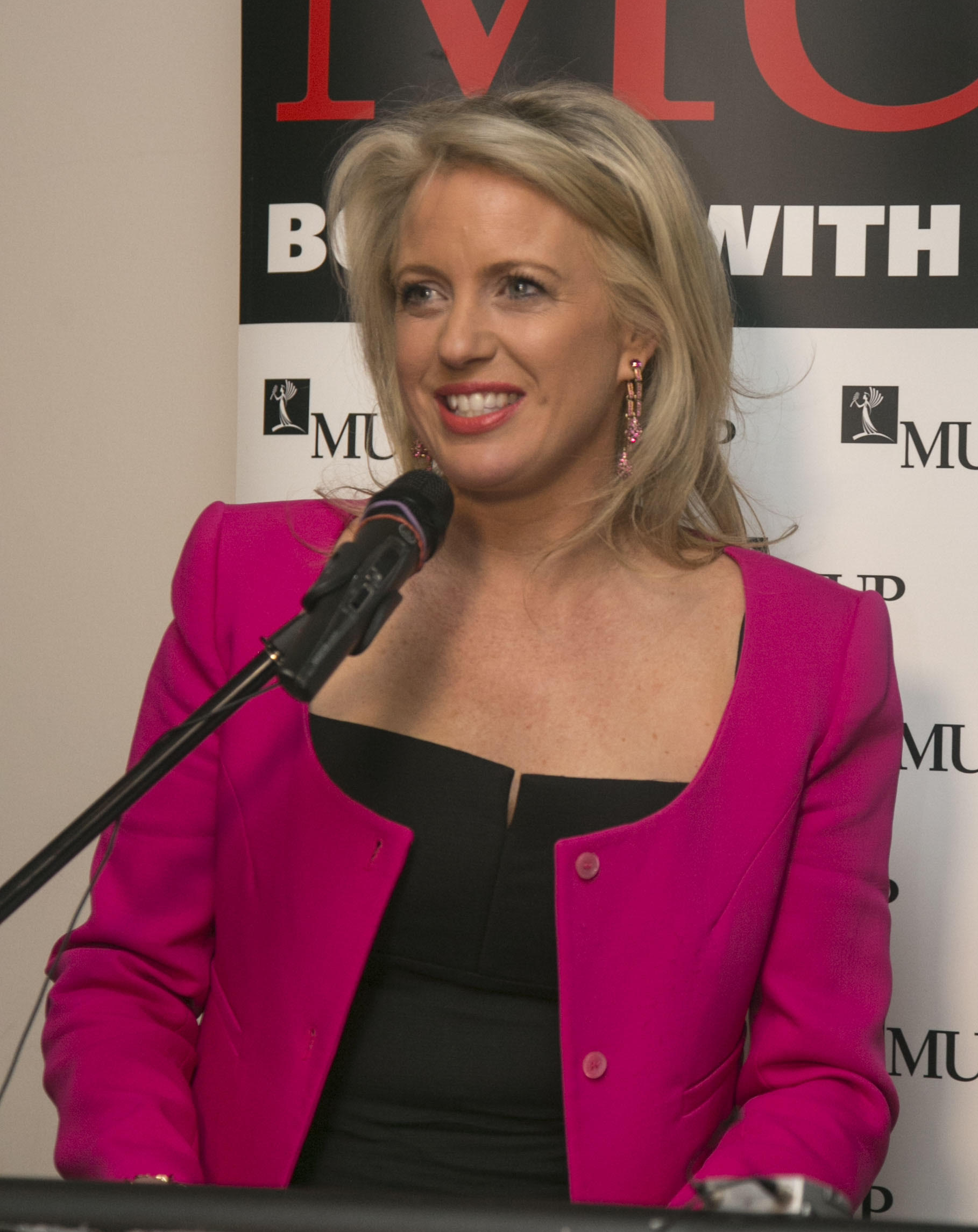
- Shorten in 2015
- Born: Clothilde Edwina Louise Bryce; 1971 (age 54–55); Brisbane, Queensland, Australia
- Education: Indooroopilly State High School; Somerville House School
- Alma mater: Deakin University; University of Queensland
- Spouses: Roger Parkin (m. 1997; div. 2009) Bill Shorten (m. 2009)
- Children: 3
- Parent(s): Michael Bryce; Dame Quentin Bryce

Clothilde Edwina Louise Shorten (née Bryce; born 1971) is an Australian company director, corporate affairs specialist, author, and public advocate. She is the spouse of Professor Bill Shorten, former Leader of the Opposition and subsequent Minister for the National Disability Insurance Scheme in the Albanese Government. The daughter of Dame Quentin Bryce, Australia's 25th Governor-General, Shorten has built an independent career spanning journalism, more than two decades of corporate communications leadership in the resources and technology sectors, and a growing portfolio of health, finance, digital rights, and social service board directorships.

== Early life and education ==
Shorten was born in Brisbane in 1971 as the fourth of five children. Her mother is Dame Quentin Bryce, who was the Governor-General of Australia, and her father is Michael Bryce. She grew up in the suburb of St Lucia, which contains the University of Queensland, where her mother was a law lecturer and tutor. She attended Ironside State School, Somerville House, and Indooroopilly State High School. At primary school, she was a friend of future senator Kimberley Kitching.

After high school, she joined the Sunday Mail in Brisbane as a copygirl and started studying an online degree in communications through Deakin University in Victoria. She also started, but did not complete, an MBA at the University of Queensland.

== Career ==
=== Early career ===
Between 1993 and 1994, Shorten worked at Lexmark as a marketing assistant. Then in 2000, Shorten began working in communications at Mincom until 2002. From 2005 she then worked for Cement Australia. Writing is Shorten's third career, having started working life as a journalist before becoming a public affairs specialist in large corporate organisations in the resources and technology sectors.

=== Corporate communications ===
Shorten built an executive career spanning more than 25 years in the engineering, resources, and technology sectors, advising boards on media, investor, government, and community relations. She developed and led issues and crisis management functions, directed brand strategy, oversaw corporate communications, and managed investor and community engagement through change processes in resources, mining, and information technology corporations.

Recommencing her career in 2014, after a four-year break to rear her first child with Bill Shorten, she worked at engineering services company Calibre. She then resigned in 2016 to spend more time with her husband on the election campaign trail.

She holds qualifications in communications, marketing, management, and corporate social responsibility. She has since added credentials in AI governance and leadership, including completion of a practitioner program at Stanford University's Ethics, Technology and Public Policy course. Her professional affiliations include membership of the Australian Institute of Company Directors (MAICD), the Governance Institute of Australia (GIA(Aff)), and the Global AI Sustainability Taskforce (GAIST).

== Board appointments and governance roles ==
=== Alfred Health ===
Shorten was appointed a Director of Alfred Health on 1 July 2020 and was promoted to be its Deputy Chair of the board in 2024. She chairs the Alfred Health Community Advisory Committee and is a member of the Quality and Safety Committee. She has spoken publicly on digital health, AI governance in hospital settings, and the conditions required to sustain public trust in health systems.

=== Industry Funds Services ===
In August 2017, Shorten was appointed to the Board of Industry Funds Services (IFS). She served as Chair of the IFS Group Remuneration Committee from September 2024 until August 2025, and has been a member of the Audit, Risk and Compliance Committee since December 2019.

=== Southern Metropolitan Cemeteries Trust ===
Shorten serves as a Director of the Southern Metropolitan Cemeteries Trust (SMCT), a Victorian Government public entity responsible to the Minister for Health that administers eight cemetery and memorial park sites across Melbourne's southern suburbs.

=== Centre for Digital Wellbeing ===
Shorten was appointed Chair of the Centre for Digital Wellbeing Advisory Board in 2023. In this capacity she has spoken and written widely on children's digital rights, data privacy, algorithmic harm, and the governance obligations of technology companies toward minors. She has been a member of the Australian Child Rights Taskforce within the Network for Quality Digital Education.

== Advocacy and public roles ==
=== Family violence and gender equality ===
Shorten describes herself as passionate about equal opportunity and ending family violence. She has been an Ambassador for the Victorian Government's Victoria Against Violence campaign and is a Patron of Our Watch. She led a campaign with Our Watch encouraging parents to challenge gender stereotypes in children from infancy, based on research showing that children learn gender-role behaviour associated with domestic violence as early as age two. She has written that she credits her mother, Dame Quentin Bryce, with instilling a lifelong commitment to ending family violence; Bryce chaired the Queensland Government's Not Now, Not Ever Taskforce on domestic and family violence.

=== Burnet Institute ===
Shorten is a strategic advisor for the Burnet Institute in Papua New Guinea. She has been a member of the Institute's Strategic Engagement Committee and a Strategic Advisor for its Healthy Mothers, Healthy Babies program.

=== Youth homelessness ===
In April 2020, Shorten was appointed the inaugural Ambassador of the Foyer Foundation, the national not-for-profit organisation that connects young people experiencing homelessness with integrated housing and education support. She has hosted the Foyer Foundation's Blown Away: Conversations in Youth Foyers podcast series. She is also an Ambassador for Youth Mental Health at Victoria University.

=== Children's online safety ===
Shorten has been an active public commentator on the regulation of social media platforms, algorithmic harm to children, and the obligations of technology companies toward minors. She has written and spoken on the concept of "dark patterns" in digital design and their particular risk to minors. In 2023 she appeared on the Burning Platforms podcast to examine the case for using law to define and enforce the rights of minors online.

=== Gidget Foundation ===
In 2018, Shorten was appointed as an Ambassador for the Gidget Foundation, whose mission is to raise awareness of perinatal anxiety and depression.

=== Other roles ===
Shorten has served as Ambassador for the Furlong Park School for Deaf Children and as a Patron of the Questacon Foundation. She is also an Ambassador for Youth Mental Health at Victoria University.

== Personal life ==
Shorten's first marriage was to Brisbane architect Roger Parkin. She sometimes used the surname "Bryce-Parkin" during that time. They were divorced in 2009. She and Parkin have two children who now primarily live with her and her second husband, Bill Shorten, in Melbourne.

She met Shorten in 2007, when she was working in corporate relations in the resource industry and he was the Parliamentary Secretary for Disabilities and Children's Services in the Rudd ministry. She moved to Melbourne and married Shorten in November 2009, giving birth to their child in January 2010.

She has written candidly about the experience of separation, remarriage, and blended family life, including the scrutiny that publicly visible family change attracts and the lack of resources available to help families navigate it. These experiences directly informed her first book.

== Publications ==
Shorten's first book Take Heart – A Story for Modern Stepfamilies was published by Melbourne University Press in 2017. Her second book, The Secret Ingredient: The Power of the Family Table, about the importance of regular family meals at the kitchen table, was published in April 2018.

She writes and speaks regularly on social issues including digital governance, children's rights, gender equity, and family violence.
