= Queensland University Squadron =

- Active: 1950–73
- Country: Australia
- Branch: Royal Australian Air Force
- Type: Training establishment
- Role: RAAF General Reserve Officer Training
- Garrison/HQ: Brisbane, Queensland
- Mottos: Latin: Peritus Ac Paratus ("Skilled and Ready")

The Queensland University Squadron (QUS) was an active Citizens Air Force (CAF) squadron, being part of the Royal Australian Air Force (RAAF) and tasked with training commissioned officers for the RAAF General Reserve recruited from University of Queensland undergraduates from 1950 to 1973. It trained 600 RAAF commissioned officers over 24 years.

== Background ==
"Capital City" Squadrons, such as No. 23 (City of Brisbane) Squadron, were first formed as part of the Citizens Air Force (CAF) component of the Royal Australian Air Force (RAAF) in the years prior to World War II. In Australia these squadrons were based on the concept of the Royal Air Force (RAF) CAF Squadrons which were first formed in the United Kingdom in the 1920s and lapsed after World War II. In addition to No. 23 Squadron, other squadrons were formed in Sydney, Melbourne, Adelaide, and Perth. They were reformed in 1948 due to the tense atmosphere of the European Cold War and Berlin Blockade and are still operational today, although in a non-flying capacity.

In the early 1950s, University Squadrons were formed in Queensland, New South Wales, Victoria, Tasmania, South Australia and Western Australia to provide officer training to undergraduates who would then serve as commissioned officers in the RAAF General Reserve. Training was conducted on a part-time basis over a two-year period for each intake of cadets. Instruction in Air Force administration and law plus practical drill and field exercises at Air Force bases during university holiday periods complemented the cadet's academic training.

The Queensland University Squadron (QUS) was formed at the Recruiting Centre, Brisbane, on 31 October 1950 and was disbanded on 25 August 1973, together with the other University Squadrons in Australia after the end of National Service. Its motto was Peritus Ac Paratus ("Skilled and Ready"). The Squadron's equivalent in the Australian Army is the Queensland University Regiment.

== History ==
=== Formation ===
Even before its formation in 1921, the Royal Australian Air Force was planned, like the Australian Army, to be predominantly a citizen force. This resulted in the formation of the "Capital City" Squadrons – Nos. 21, 22, 23, 24 and 25 – in the years leading up to World War II. At the outbreak of the war, approximately two-thirds of Air Force personnel were from the Citizen Air Force. While these squadrons were organised along RAF lines, there were no University Squadrons as had existed in the United Kingdom since 1929, which had provided the RAF with a significant capability during the early stages of World War II. Because of the far-sightedness of Lord Trenchard, the "Father of the RAF", more than a quarter of the operationally trained fighter pilots at the outset of the Battle of Britain came from these and a lesser number of Auxiliary Squadrons.

Despite lacking a similar program, at the height of World War II, the RAAF grew rapidly, eventually becoming the fourth largest air force in the war. Following the war, the RAAF had been rapidly demobilised, but in mid-1948, the increasingly tense atmosphere of the Cold War in Europe, as evidenced by the Berlin Blockade, resulted in its resurgence. The Citizen Air Force Squadrons were then re-formed in Australia. This was followed in 1950 by the rapid formation of University Squadrons. The RAAF approached the University of Queensland (UQ) to establish a Queensland University Squadron and the proposal was considered and approved by the Committee of Deans on 11 September 1950. This was followed three days later by a meeting between the Chief of the Air Staff, Air Marshal Sir George Jones, and the Vice Chancellor to finalize the proposal.

Within weeks, Flight Lieutenant G.R. Baker, an RAF officer on secondment to the RAAF, was appointed to commence setting up the new Air Force unit and an article appeared in The Courier-Mail of 1 November 1950 announcing that a "Varsity Air Unit" would be formed almost immediately. Three days later there appeared another article with the headline "Rush Uni Air Group" followed by "Students yesterday flooded the RAAF with applications to join the Queensland University Air Squadron" as the squadron was established. The article also announced the appointment of Flight Lieutenant W.O.K. Hewitt as the first Commanding Officer; Hewitt had an outstanding war record, which included participation in the first aerial defence of Australian soil, when a handful of obsolete Wirraways had clashed with a large Japanese invading force at Rabaul in early 1942.

Selection Boards soon followed and the first nine successful applicants were sworn in as Air Cadets in the Active Citizen Air Force at a ceremony held on 23 November in the University Senate Room, with attendant press coverage. By early December the squadron was operational and consisted of Works/Technical, Medical, and Special Duties-Admin/Intel Flights. In the weeks that followed the first Squadron Camp was held, one week at Point Cook (travelling by service aircraft) and a second at Amberley. A total of 47 cadets took part and were finally properly "kitted", including being issued the "Officer's Cap, Badge" over a white band, which became a signature of the uniform worn.

=== Training activities ===
With the coming of the 1951 academic year and against the backdrop of the Korean War, the squadron soon became active, holding its first parade on 1 April. The unit later added a Flying Flight, with 10 selected officer cadets receiving training on Tiger Moths. Weekend training at RAAF Archerfield was well attended, as were the evening drill parades and lectures that were provided, often from recently returned Korean War veterans. The Annual Camp was held at the Officers Training School at Rathmines on Lake Macquarie. All of this acted to offset the effect of indifference, and even occasional rejection, from members of the RAAF Permanent Air Force (PAF) and the on-campus hostility from members of the "Peace Movement" during the Korean War and in the years after. This was repeated during the Vietnam War period.

In 1952, the Commanding Officer, Squadron Leader Hewitt, was posted to fly Meteors with No. 77 Squadron RAAF in Korea. He was replaced by Squadron Leader Noel Eliot, AFC AE, who was a veteran of both World War II and the Korean War with 219 missions flying transport aircraft, including many involving the evacuation of wounded soldiers from the battlefront. Shot down during a World War II bombing mission, for several months he had led the survivors of his crew through Nazi-occupied France, evading capture. In 1954, the Queensland University Squadron celebrated its first graduation parade, which was held in late July at the UQ George Street campus, with a number University and senior Royal Australian Air Force personnel in attendance.

Not long afterwards, the squadron also received its Unit Crest. Forty-five cadets who had passed their General Service and Specialist Exams were later gazetted, upon receiving their university degrees, as having been commissioned as pilot officers in the RAAF General Reserve. The squadron benefited over the next 20 years from a pool of dedicated and long-serving Graduate Instructors who appreciated the culture, which combined officer status with strict parade-ground discipline and other service training. Normal student exuberance sometimes required the understanding and authority of experienced Commanding Officers.

The squadron settled into a two-year training pattern, with the first consisting of General Service training and the second Specialist, while continuing to accept new recruits as each course graduated. The squadron also provided an introduction to Air Force life for those who been awarded RAAF Undergraduate Scholarships as recipients were posted to University Squadrons. Biouvouacs and survival training were held at Greenbank and the Jungle Training Centre at Canungra under the control of Army personnel, and at Beechmont, Lake Manchester and Colleges Crossing. General Service Training and/or on the job training was held at RAAF establishments at Rathmines, Richmond, Laverton, Elizabeth, Wagga, Williamtown, Garbutt, and Amberley (almost exclusively from the late 1960s). During the academic year, training was held on Wednesday evening. Members enlisted into the PAF under the Undergraduate Scholarship Scheme were required to attend Wednesday parades to undertake the basic Officer Training Course. Graduation parades after about 1958 were held at the squadron's base. However, in the late 1960s when the squadron's continuous training camps were held at Amberley a good relationship between the RAAF base and the squadron developed. With the encouragement of the then Air Commodore Deryck Kingwell CBE DSO, graduation parades were held at Amberley.

Links between QUS and No. 23 Squadron began earlier in the 1960s when Squadron Instructors were posted to No. 23 Squadron with attachment to QUS. This was beneficial for the Instructors as it exposed them to a working role rather than a pure teaching role. QUS proved a good recruiting ground for No. 23 Squadron with many squadron graduates joining No. 23 Squadron, while many others went on to serve in the PAF. Some were scholarship holders but many enjoyed the service experience, which encouraged them to join the PAF. Some former QUS members were appointed as Honorary Aide-de-Camps (ADCs) to the Governor of Queensland. Those who served in either the PAF or CAF did so with distinction and many attained high rank, with one becoming an Air Vice Marshal. A number of instructors were awarded the Air Efficiency Award (AE), while other QUS members later received the Reserve Force Medal as they continued their service with No. 23 Squadron. In the late 1960s, some University graduates were able to join the squadron as an alternative to the conscription ballot during the Vietnam War but only a few were accepted.

=== Disbandment ===
After over more than 24 years, the University Squadrons were disbanded in late 1973 due to a change of Government and policy, following a review by the Department of Air. Many of the graduating commissioned officers who pursued civilian careers from major faculties such as Medicine, Arts, Law, Engineering, Architecture, Commerce and Sciences went on to become leaders in their chosen professions. It is estimated that during its life, the Queensland University Squadron produced approximately 600 commissioned officers and the other States another 2,500. This was comparable to the total permanent Air Force officer strength at the time, enabling it to rapidly double in size should the need have arisen.

== Squadron Crest ==
The Squadron Crest was designed in 1955 by a cadet who subsequently rose to prominence as an architect. In 2010, the unit badge, along with that of the Queensland University Regiment were sculpted in sandstone for installation in the colonnade of the UQ quadrangle at the St Lucia campus by Dr. Rhyl Hinwood AM. Both badges were unveiled during the Alumni Week of the celebration of the Centenary of the University of Queensland on 3 July 2010, by Her Excellency, Ms. Quentin Bryce AC, Governor General and Commander in Chief of the Australian Defence Force. The Guard for the Governor General comprised members of the Queensland University Regiment and RAAF Gap Year Cadets.

== Squadron Sword of Honour ==
The United Service Club (USC) Sword of Honour was a perpetual trophy, presented by that club to the squadron in 1969. The prize was awarded to the squadron graduate who, by his personal example and powers of leadership, had exercised the greatest influence upon his fellows whilst a member of the squadron. The first recipient received the award at a gradation parade reviewed by Air Commodore Kingwell. Other awards were made in 1970, 1971 and 1973. Following the disbanding of the squadron in August 1973, the sword was secured for the first Squadron reunion. Subsequently, the QUS Branch arranged for the sword to be refurbished and installed in the Military Bar of The United Service Club – Queensland. This took place on 19 February 2010 in the presence of Air Vice Marshal Glen Reed (retired), a former squadron member and Patron of the RAAF Association–Queensland Division, and Air Commodore Christopher Sawade CSC.

== RAAF Association–QUS Branch ==
Past Queensland University Squadron members are eligible to join the RAAF Association–QUS Branch. The mission of the branch includes supporting the Australian Air Force Cadets (AAFC), encouraging youth interest in aviation, perpetuating the memory of the squadron, keeping members informed about Air Force developments and Defence issues, member welfare, and lobbying for the reintroduction of University Squadrons in Australia. On behalf of the Bomber Command Association in Australia, the QUS Branch, with assistance from RAAF Amberley, organises the annual Bomber Command Commemorative Service to ensure that the veterans who served in Bomber Command during World War II are recognised for their achievements and sacrifices. Official guests have included the Commander, Combat Support Group, and the Officer Commanding No. 82 Wing RAAF.

== Commanding officers ==
The following officers commanded QUS:

- Flight Lieutenant W.O.K. Hewitt (1950–52)
- Flight Lieutenant N.S. Eliot (1952–54)
- Flight Lieutenant T.C. McGrath (1954–56)
- Flight Lieutenant J.T. Dollisson (1956–58)
- Squadron Leader R.B. Aronsen (1958–59)
- Squadron Leader G. Hughes (1959–64)
- Squadron Leader Goy (1964–67)
- Squadron Leader D.L. Dunstan (1967–68)
- Squadron Leader K.D. Clark (1968–69)
- Squadron Leader L.R. Watkin (1969–73)
- Squadron Leader J.J. Nicholson (1973)

== Gallery ==
Cadet Officer's Cap

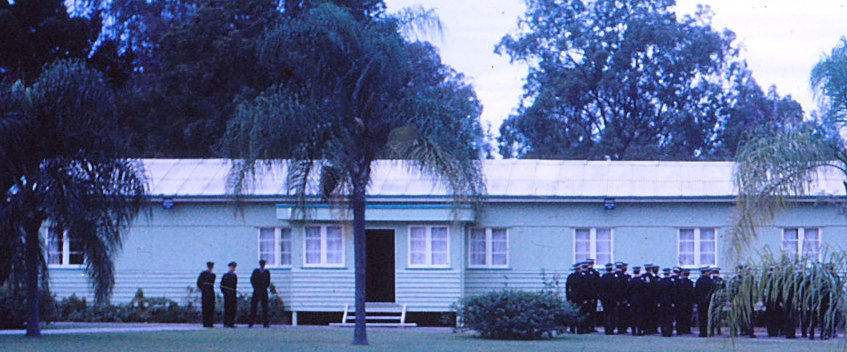
Typical training facilities at RAAF Base Amberley c. 1965

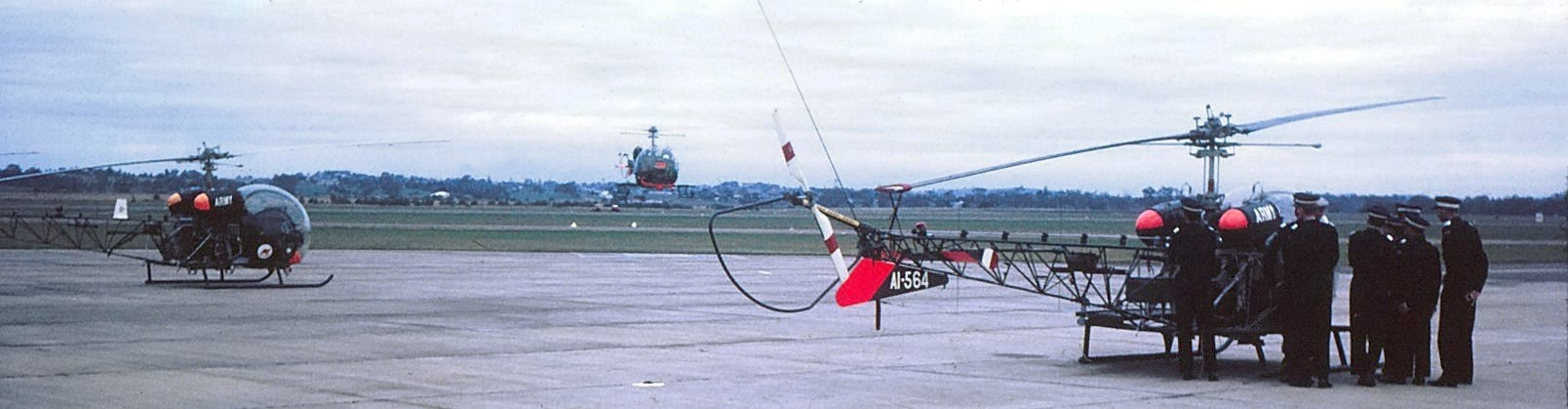
Cadets inspect Army light aircraft c. 1965

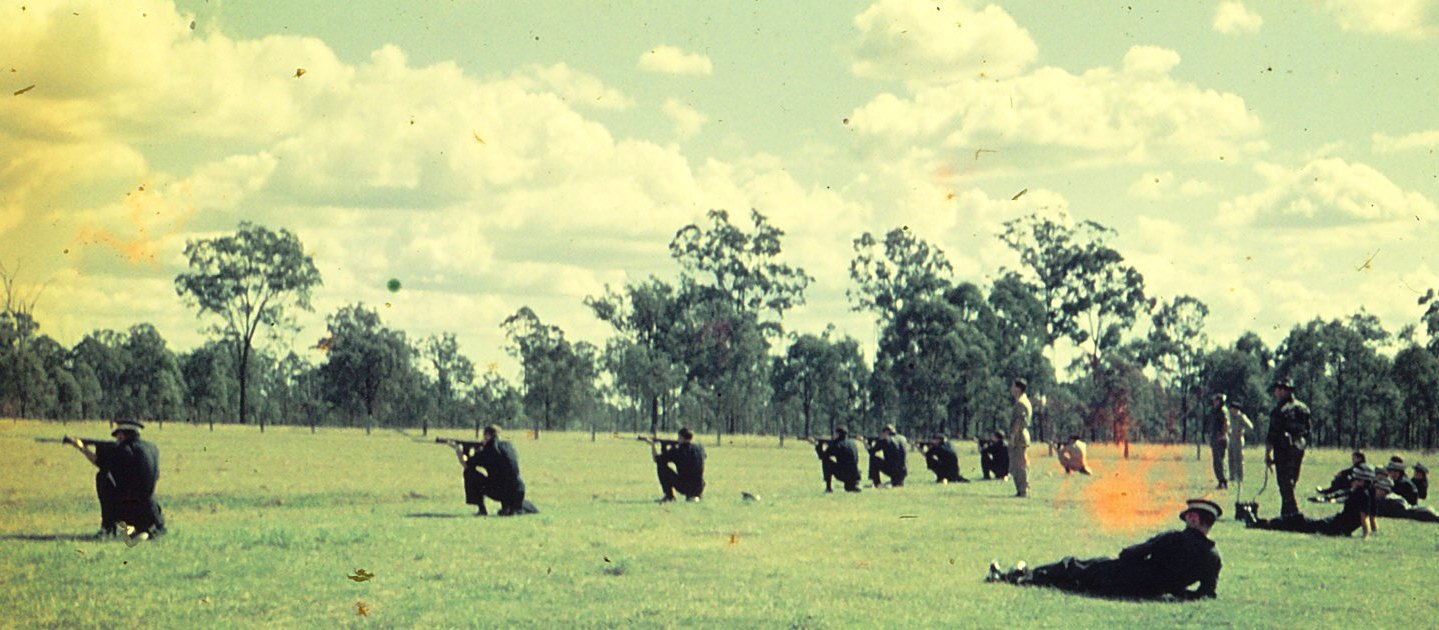
Cadets during field training c. 1965

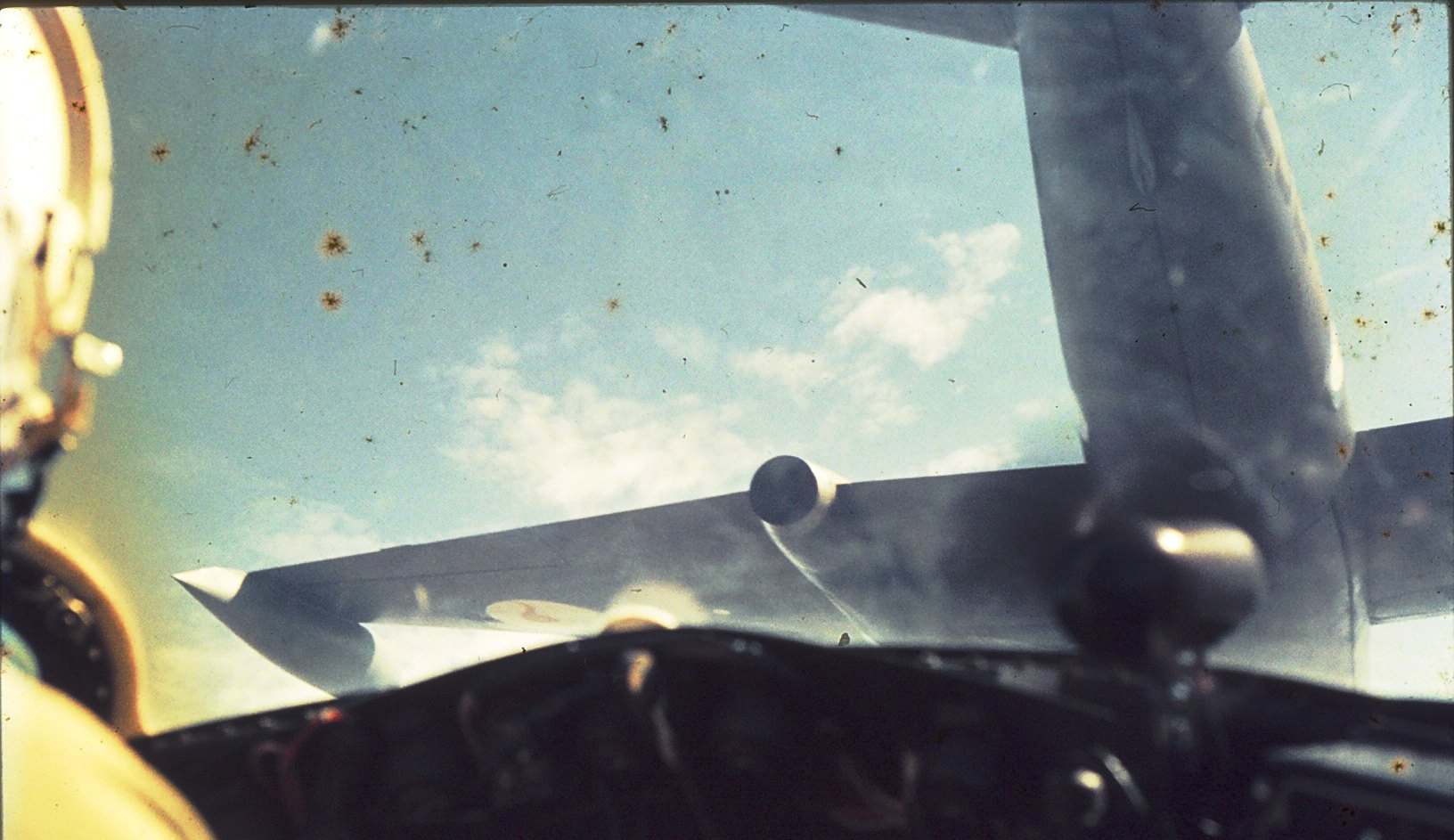
Cadets experience a Canberra bomber run over Evans Head c. 1965

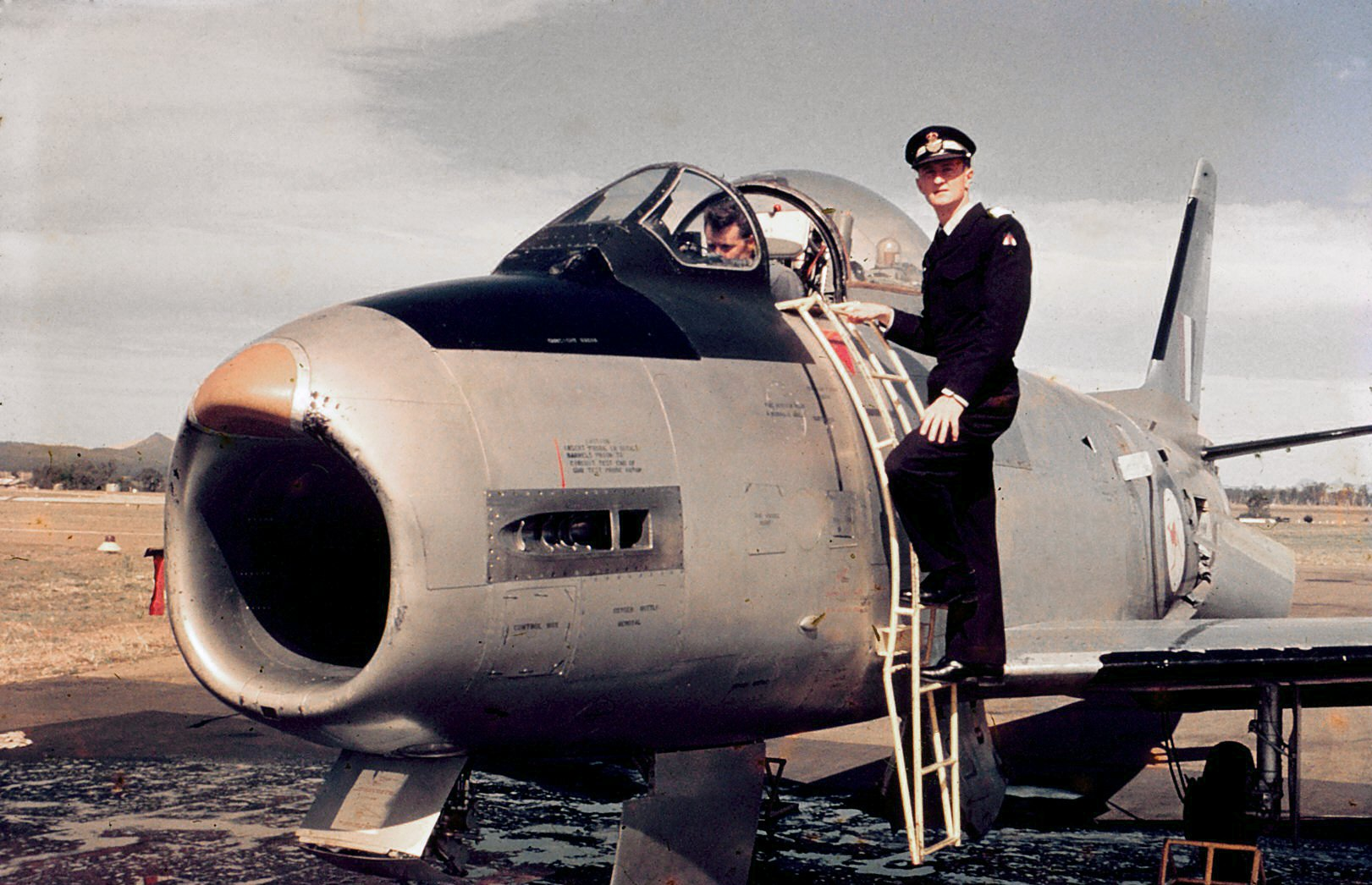
Cadet inspects a Sabre fighter at Amberley c. 1965

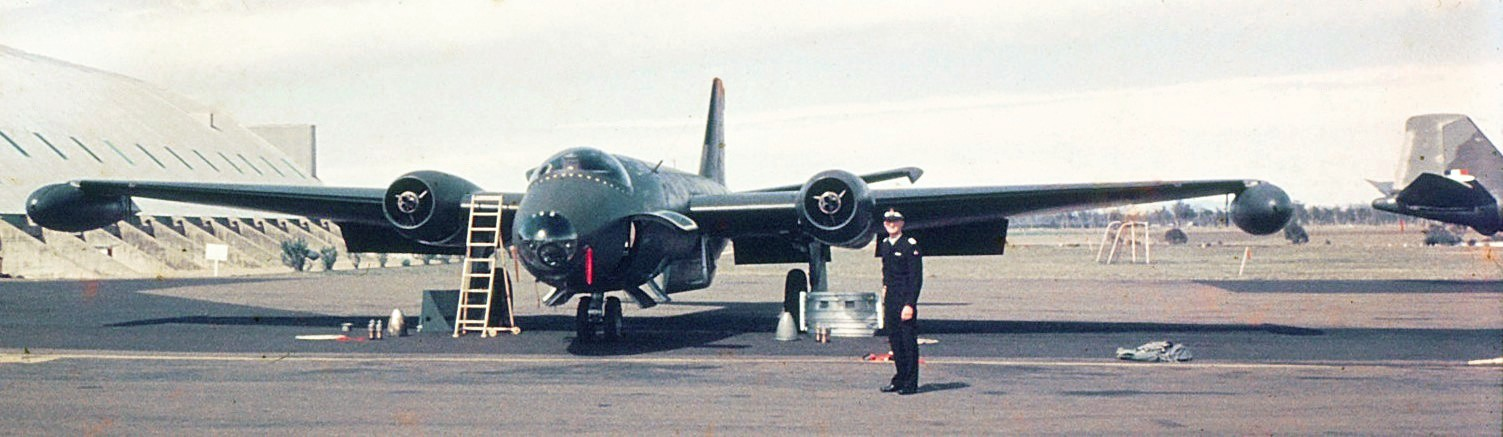
Cadet familiarisation of Canberra bomber maintenance at Amberley c.1965

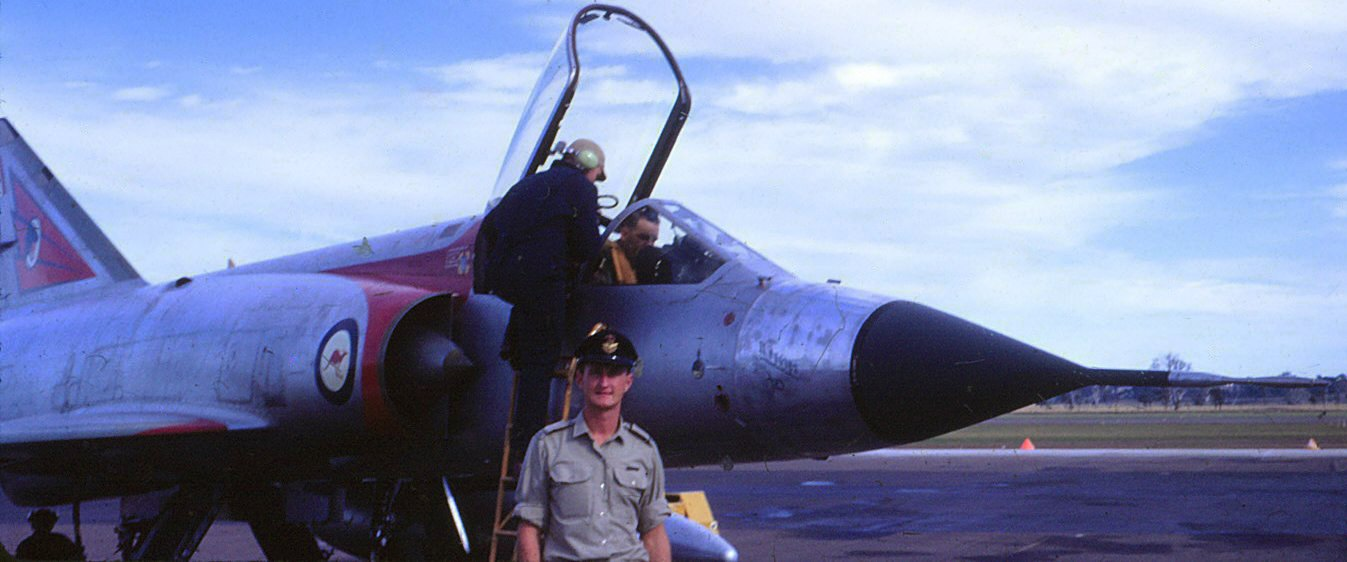
QUS Instructor with a Mirage fighter at Amberley c. 1968

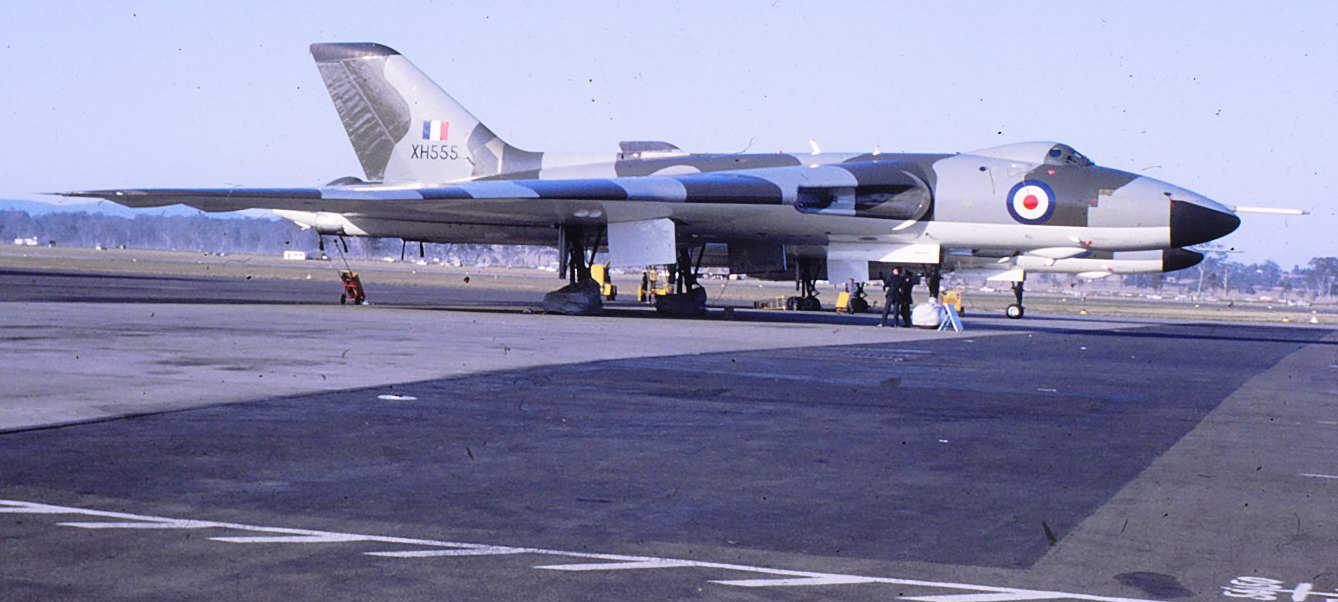
Visiting RAF Vulcan at Amberley c. 1966

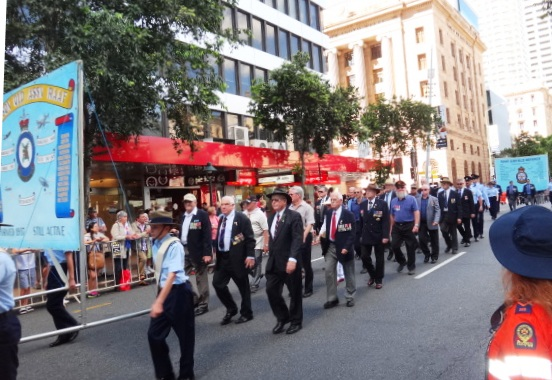
Anzac Day Parade, QUS and 23 Squadron RAAF Association, Brisbane 2013

== See also ==
- University Air Squadron
