= Quentin Bryce =

Governor-General of Australia from 2008 to 2014

The Honourable Dame Quentin Bryce AD, CVO, FAAL, FASSA
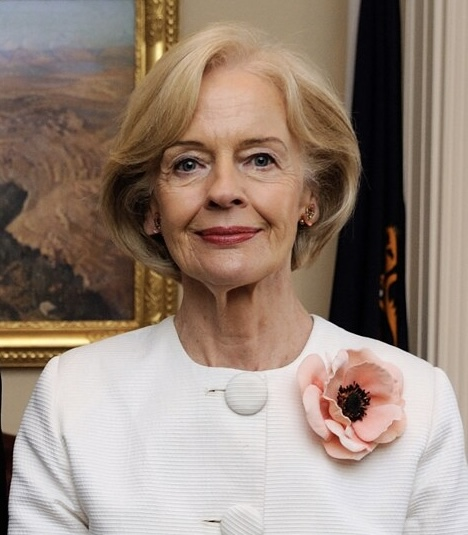
- Bryce in 2013

25th Governor-General of Australia
- In office 5 September 2008 – 29 March 2014
- Monarch: Elizabeth II
- Prime Minister: Kevin Rudd; Julia Gillard; Tony Abbott
- Preceded by: Michael Jeffery
- Succeeded by: Peter Cosgrove

24th Governor of Queensland
- In office 29 July 2003 – 29 July 2008
- Monarch: Elizabeth II
- Premier: Peter Beattie; Anna Bligh
- Preceded by: Peter Arnison
- Succeeded by: Penelope Wensley

Personal details
- Born: Quentin Alice Louise Strachan; 23 December 1942 (age 83) Brisbane, Queensland, Australia
- Spouse: Michael Bryce (m. 1964; died 2021)
- Children: 5, including Chloe
- Relatives: Bill Shorten (son-in-law)
- Education: University of Queensland

Dame Quentin Alice Louise Bryce (née Strachan; born 23 December 1942) is an Australian academic who served as the 25th governor-general of Australia from 2008 to 2014. She is the first woman to have held the position. She was previously the 24th governor of Queensland from 2003 to 2008.

Born in Brisbane, Queensland, Bryce was raised in Ilfracombe, with her family subsequently living in a number of country towns around Australia. She attended the University of Queensland, where she completed Bachelor of Arts and Bachelor of Laws degrees, becoming one of the first women accepted to the Queensland Bar.

In 1968, Bryce became the first woman appointed as a faculty member of the law school where she had studied. In 1978 she joined the new National Women's Advisory Council (later the National Women's Consultative Council and then the Australian Council for Women). This was followed by appointment to a number of positions, including the first director of the Queensland Women's Information Service, the Queensland director of the Human Rights and Equal Opportunity Commission, and the Federal Sex Discrimination Commissioner in 1988. Her services to the community saw her appointed an Officer of the Order of Australia in 1988 and a Companion of the Order of Australia and Dame of the Order of St John of Jerusalem in 2003. In 2011, Elizabeth II invested Bryce as a Commander of the Royal Victorian Order at Government House.

Bryce was appointed Governor of Queensland in 2003. Although concerns were raised by some over her time in the office, her five-year term was going to be extended until 2009. However, on 13 April 2008, it was announced by Prime Minister Kevin Rudd that Bryce was to become the next Governor-General of Australia. The decision was generally well-received and on 5 September 2008 she was sworn in, succeeding Major General Michael Jeffery and becoming the first woman to hold the office. Bryce's tenure was not without criticism. In an unprecedented move for an incumbent governor-general, Bryce made public comments in November 2013 widely interpreted as supporting an Australian republic and same-sex marriage. She was succeeded by General Peter Cosgrove as governor-general on 28 March 2014.

== Early life and education ==
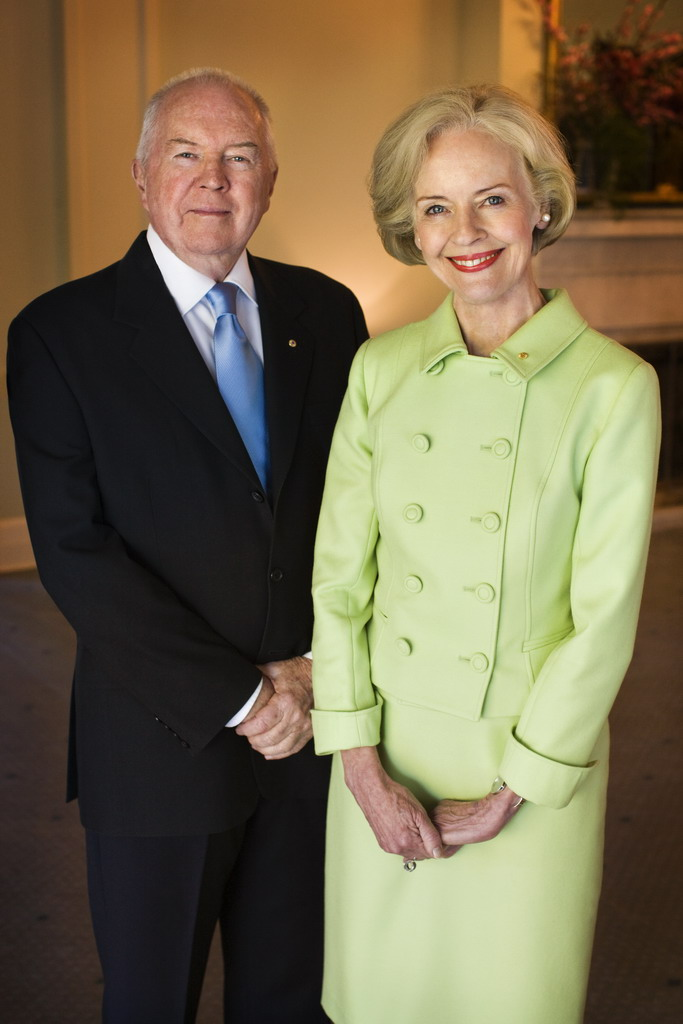
Quentin and Michael Bryce

Quentin Alice Louise Strachan was born in 1942 in Brisbane, the second of four daughters. Her parents, Norman Walter Strachan and Edwina Naida Wetzel, had taken up residence at Ilfracombe in 1940. Bryce—along with all of the children in her family—received homeschooling rather than attending the local state school. Her family left the area in 1949, initially relocating to Launceston, Tasmania, where they remained for approximately a year. Returning to Queensland, her family moved to Belmont. While living in Belmont she attended the Camp Hill State School and there first met her future husband, Michael Bryce. She was a member of Girl Guides Australia as a Brownie.

During the period that they were residing in Belmont, her father moved to Tenterfield, New South Wales. In 1956, Quentin Strachan started attending boarding school at Moreton Bay College, Wynnum, Brisbane.

Upon graduating from high school, Quentin Strachan undertook studies at the University of Queensland, initially enrolling in a social work and arts degree, but transferring to law in her third year at the institution. She graduated from the university with a Bachelor of Arts in 1962 and a Bachelor of Laws in 1965. That year she became one of the first women to be admitted to the Queensland Bar, although she never practised professionally.

Quentin Strachan married Michael Bryce on 12 December 1964; the couple have two daughters and three sons. Michael Bryce died on 15 January 2021, aged 82 years.

== Career ==
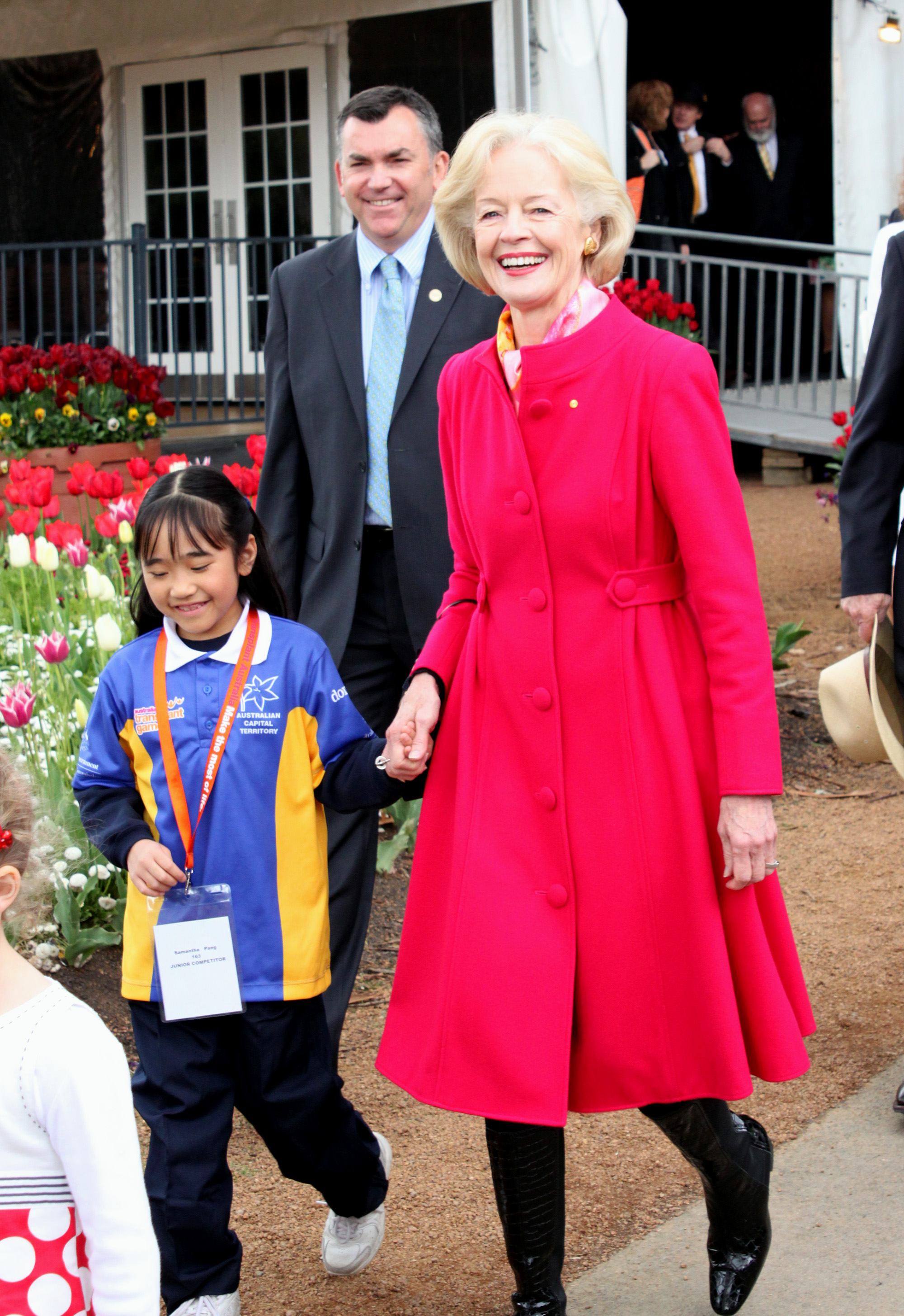
Bryce at Floriade, the national flower show in Canberra on 3 October 2010.

After spending some time in London, Bryce returned to Australia and accepted a part-time tutoring position at the T. C. Beirne School of Law at the University of Queensland in 1968, thus becoming the first woman to be appointed to the faculty. In 1969 she took up a lecturing position at the law school, and she continued to teach at the university until 1983.

In 1978 the Fraser government formed the National Women's Advisory Council and Bryce was "vaulted to prominence" with her appointment to the council, taking on the role of convener in 1982. In 1984 she became the first director of the Queensland Women's Information Service under the umbrella of the Office of the Status of Women and was appointed as the "women's representative on the National Committee on Discrimination in Employment and Occupation". In 1987 she became the Queensland director of the Human Rights and Equal Opportunity Commission (HREOC).

Over a five-year period (1988–1993) Bryce served as Federal Sex Discrimination Commissioner during the time of the Hawke Labor government. Her time in the role was a busy one, with around 2,000 complaints being handled by the commission each year and the work difficult and complex. The period was also noted as being one of "galloping legal reform" for the rights of women, yet, as Sandra McLean described it, Bryce kept a firm grip on the "reins of change" during this time. Nevertheless, concerns were raised when, in 1990, Alexander Proudfoot formally complained that the women's health centres in the Australian Capital Territory were operating in breach of the Sex Discrimination Act. This culminated in 1994 when Bryce faced an HREOC hearing after being accused of discriminating against Proudfoot – and ended when the commission found in Bryce's favour and dismissed the complaint, stating that the behaviour in question "did not reflect on the way Ms Bryce discharged her duties".

After finishing her time as the Sex Discrimination Commissioner, Bryce became the founding chair and chief executive officer of the National Childcare Accreditation Council, where she remained for three years before changing direction between 1997 and 2003 when she became the principal and chief executive officer of The Women's College within the University of Sydney, New South Wales. The move was said to have "stunned her political and legal acquaintances", but Bryce saw it as bringing "together all the life skills and attributes" that she had acquired, as well as providing an opportunity to have an influence on the students' futures.

In other roles, Bryce has been the chair of the National Breast Cancer Advisory Council, sat on the Australian Women's Cricket Board and has been a member of organisations such as the YWCA, the Australian Children's Television Foundation and the Association for the Welfare of Children in Hospital. Bryce was also a US State Department Visitor in 1978 and a member of the Australian Delegation to the UN Human Rights Commission in Geneva, Switzerland, from 1989 to 1991.

== Governor of Queensland ==
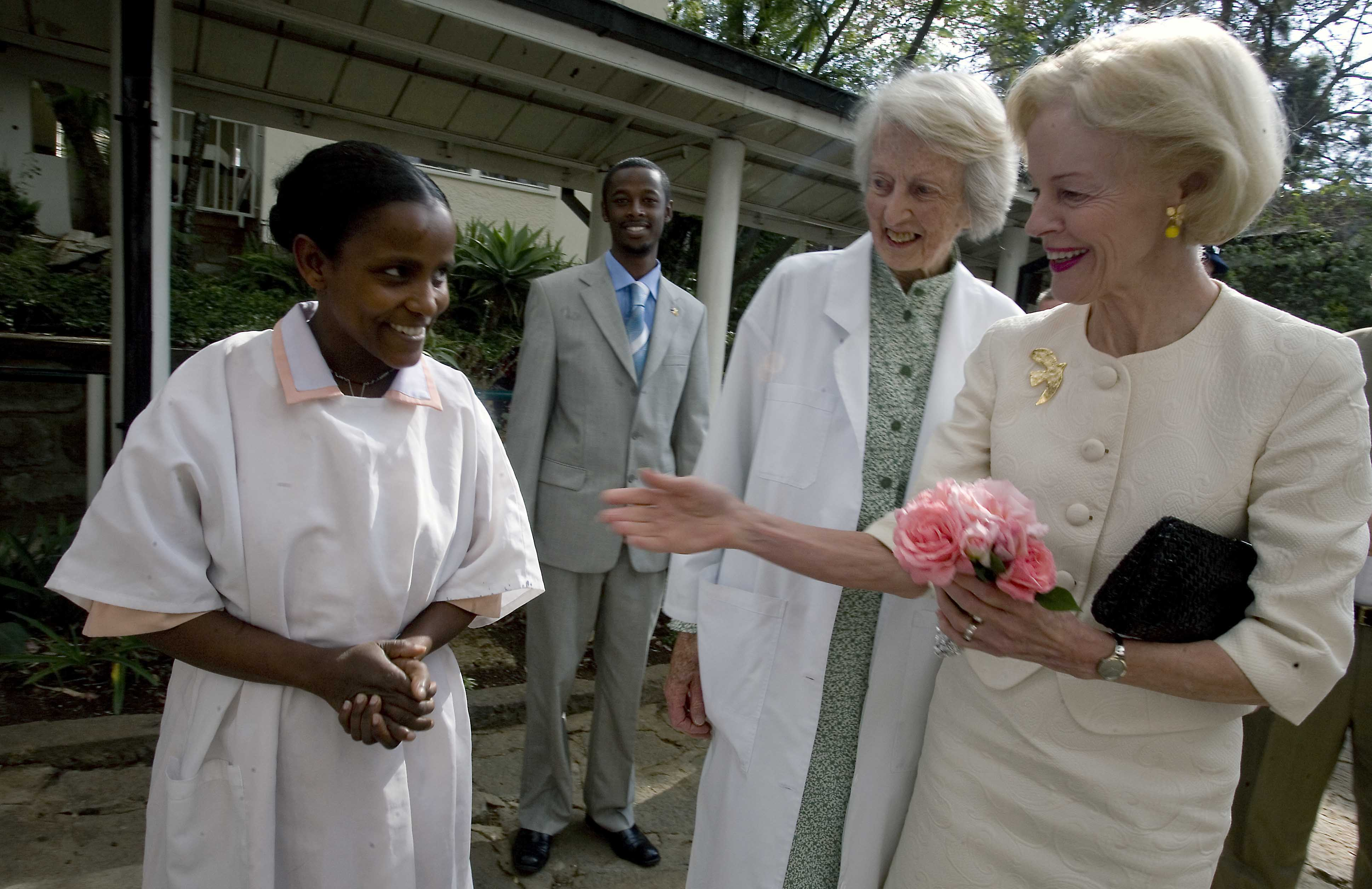
Bryce (far right) during a March 2009 visit to Addis Ababa, Ethiopia

In 2003, on the recommendation of the Premier of Queensland, Peter Beattie, Elizabeth II, Queen of Australia, appointed Bryce as Governor of Queensland, the second woman to occupy the position. Once Bryce's nomination had been accepted by the Queen, Beattie opened it up for debate in the Legislative Assembly—an "unprecedented" move performed by the premier as the first step in changing the manner by which the nominations are managed. Nevertheless, the outcome was never in doubt, as Beattie had a majority in the Legislative Assembly and had "cleared the vote with the National and Liberal leaders" prior to the debate.

Bryce's time at Government House, Brisbane, was not always peaceful, but she was considered by some as a "highly respected figure" during her time as governor. Concerns raised in the media included the "substantial" exit of staff at Government House not long after Bryce became governor, as at least eight staff, including the executive office, head chef, house manager and gardener resigned or were fired during her term, and the use of Government House for private parties. In response to the latter, Beattie argued that there was nothing wrong with holding private functions at Government House, especially as Bryce had paid for the events out of her own pocket, while the Queensland Public Sector Union stated in 2008 that the staff disputes were "with the management as a whole, but there wasn't anything specific against the Governor". Staff at Queensland Government House had "not [been] enthusiastic" about Bryce as Queensland governor. A former staff member described Bryce as a "control freak". During this time, Bryce was the Patron of Girl Guides Queensland and is the current Patron of Australian Age of Dinosaurs.

In January 2008, it was announced her initial five-year term, due to end in late July, was to be extended to cover the period of Queensland's sesquicentennial celebrations in 2009. In making the announcement, Labor Premier Anna Bligh described how Bryce had been an "inspiring leader" while serving as governor, and acknowledged Bryce's willingness to spend a "great deal of time" in regional and remote areas, serving as a "Governor for all of Queensland". The extension did not eventuate, however, as she was appointed governor-general, and she was succeeded as Queensland governor on 29 July 2008 by Penelope Wensley.

== Governor-General of Australia ==
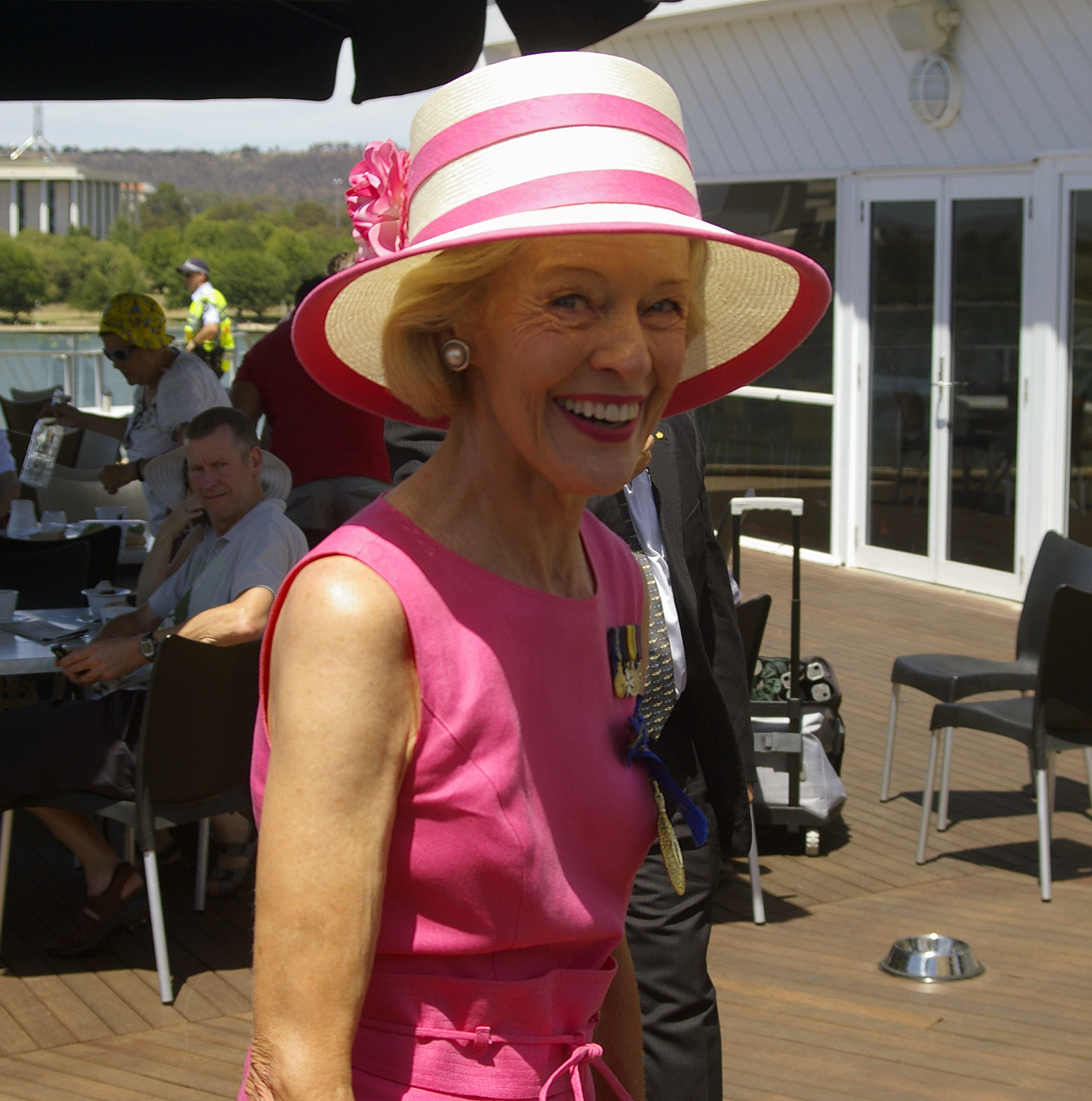
Bryce after an interview at Regatta Point at the Australia Day ceremony in Canberra on 26 January 2010

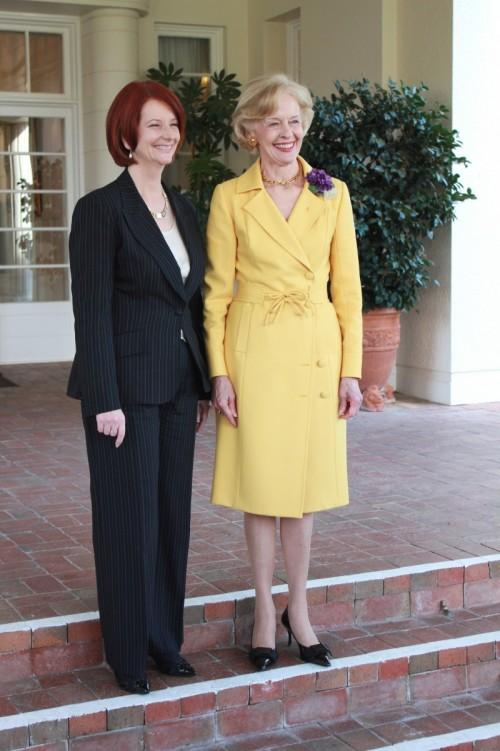
Former Australia prime minister Julia Gillard with Bryce

On 13 April 2008 it was announced that, on the recommendation of the Labor prime minister, Kevin Rudd, Queen Elizabeth II had approved Bryce's appointment as the next Governor-General of Australia. The decision was generally well-received; current and previous Labor state premiers supported her selection and both the then Leader of the Opposition, Brendan Nelson, and the leader of the Australian Greens, Bob Brown, spoke in favour of the decision. Patricia Edgar described Bryce's selection as an "inspired choice", while Jill Singer in the Herald Sun said that the decision signalled "an important about face for Australia".

There was some opposition to the appointment, in particular from columnist Des Houghton, who argued that she would bring a "fair bit of baggage" to the role (in reference to the controversies surrounding her time as Governor of Queensland) and that she had failed to live up to her promise to be outspoken during her time at Government House. Concerns were also raised in August 2008, when it was revealed that Bryce intended to replace Malcolm Hazell, who had been the official secretary for both Major General Michael Jeffery and Peter Hollingworth, with Stephen Brady. Rudd defended Bryce's decision, arguing that she had the right to appoint a new official secretary.

Bryce was sworn in on 5 September 2008. An extension of her term was announced on 24 October 2012, to expire in March 2014. During this time, she served as the Patron of Girl Guides Australia.

On the election of Bill Shorten as Leader of the Labor Party and Leader of the Opposition in October 2013, Bryce offered her resignation to Prime Minister Tony Abbott, in order to forestall any perception of bias, given that Bryce's daughter Chloe is married to Shorten. While acknowledging her magnanimity, Abbott declined to accept her resignation and asked her to serve the rest of her term. According to him, Bryce provided continuity at a time of political turbulence and she should be commended for her dedication to public service.

=== Controversy ===
Greg Sheridan, in the national newspaper The Australian, suggested that the governor-general risked "politicising and misusing the office". Sheridan was commenting on Bryce's planned trip to Africa on behalf of the prime minister to lobby for a seat for Australia in the United Nations Security Council. He further stated that Bryce's "feigned interest in Africa will be seen cynically by Africans". Sheridan added that governors-general should travel overseas "only rarely and for ceremonial purposes" and that "they have no right to engage in foreign policy debate, at home or abroad".

Similarly to her time as governor in Queensland, Government House in Canberra witnessed significant staff turnover, with claims that she was very difficult to work for.

In November 2013, Bryce delivered the annual ABC Boyer Lecture. She stated that she would like to see an Australia where "people are free to love and marry whom they choose ... And where perhaps, my friends, one day, one young girl or boy may even grow up to be our nation's first head of state." Her comments drew severe criticism, not merely for their support of a republic while still serving as the Queen's representative, but because the role is meant to be strictly non-partisan. Senator Dean Smith called them "a slap in the face to many, many Australians, and a significant breach of trust". Amanda Vanstone accused her of possible grandstanding and wrote that "In publicly declaring these views, she has brought that high office into a political realm in which it does not belong ... Someone might explain to her that the job is not about her ... it's about us." Then-Prime Minister Tony Abbott supported Bryce's right to comment, saying "It's more than appropriate for the Governor-General, approaching the end of her term, to express a personal view on a number of subjects, and that's what she was doing."

== Philanthropy ==
Bryce is the main patron of Girls from Oz, a charity partner of the Australian School of Performing Arts (ASPA). Girls from Oz delivers performing arts education to girls living in remote Australian communities who lack access to these opportunities.

Bryce has been a patron of Girls from Oz since its formation in 2007. Since then, she has supported Girls from Oz not only through donations, but by visiting Halls Creek and Bidyadanga, two locations where the charity works, attending numerous Girls from Oz and ASPA events and hosting a sleep-over for girls from Halls Creek at Admiralty House on two occasions.

Bryce has also previously been a patron of both Girl Guides Queensland and Girl Guides Australia.

== Honours ==
Viceregal styles of Quentin Bryce (2008–2014)
- Reference style: Her Excellency the Honourable
- Spoken style: Your Excellency

Dame of the Order of Australia (AD)	19 March 2014
Companion of the Order of Australia (AC)	30 April 2003
Officer of the Order of Australia (AO)	26 January 1988 "In recognition of service to the community, particularly to women and children".
Commander of the Royal Victorian Order (CVO)	26 October 2011 by Her Majesty, Queen Elizabeth II during her Royal Visit.
Dame of Grace of The Most Venerable Order of The Hospital of St John of Jerusalem	November 2003
Australian Sports Medal	5 December 2000 "For Services to Women's Cricket".
Centenary Medal	1 January 2001 "For service to Australian society in business leadership".
Commemorative Medal for the 30th Anniversary of Vanuatu	30 July 2010
Grand Cross of the Royal Order of the Crown	October 2010 Invested by His Majesty, King George Tupou V, King of Tonga.

=== Honorary military positions ===
- 2008–2014: Colonel-in-Chief of the Royal Australian Army Medical Corps

=== Honorary degrees ===
Queensland:

- Bryce was conferred with the degree of Honorary Doctor of the University (Hon.DUniv) by Griffith University in 2003.
- Honorary Doctor of James Cook University (Hon.DUniv (JCU))
- In 2004, Bryce was made an Honorary Doctor of the University (Hon.DU) by the Queensland University of Technology.
- In 2006 Bryce was awarded an Honorary Doctorate of Laws (Hon.LLD) by the University of Queensland.
- In 2016, Bryce was a recipient of the Queensland Greats Awards.

New South Wales:

- In 1998, she was awarded an Honorary Doctorate of Laws by Macquarie University (Hon.LLD).
- In 2002, she was awarded an Honorary Doctorate of Letters by Charles Sturt University (Hon.DLitt).
- In 2010, Bryce was awarded an Honorary Doctorate of Laws (Hon.LLD) by the University of Sydney, where she was the principal of The Women's College, University of Sydney from 1997 to 2003.
- In 2012, Bryce was awarded an Honorary Doctorate of Letters (Hon.DLitt) by the University of Western Sydney.

Bryce is a Life Fellow of the Australian Academy of Law. She was appointed an Honorary Fellow of the Academy of the Social Sciences in Australia in 2010.

== Footnotes ==
Government offices
Preceded by Pam O'Neil	Sex Discrimination Commissioner; 1988–1993	Succeeded by Sue Walpole
Preceded by Peter Arnison	Governor of Queensland; 2003–2008	Succeeded by Penelope Wensley
Preceded by Michael Jeffery	Governor-General of Australia; 2008–2014	Succeeded by Sir Peter Cosgrove
