= Alexandra Hasluck =

Australian author and historian (1908–1993)

Dame Alexandra Hasluck AD
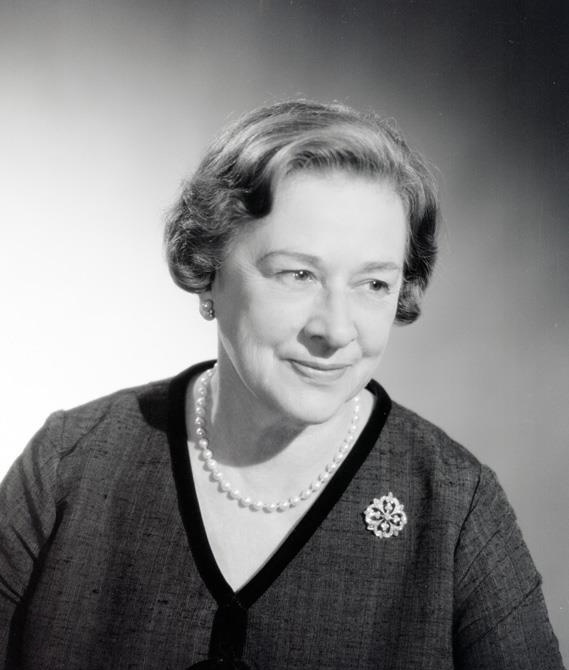
- Hasluck in 1969

Spouse of the governor-general of Australia
- In office 30 April 1969 – 11 July 1974
- Monarch: Elizabeth II
- Governor General: Sir Paul Hasluck
- Preceded by: Maie, Lady Casey
- Succeeded by: Alison, Lady Kerr

Personal details
- Born: Alexandra Margaret Martin Darker; 26 August 1908 North Perth, Western Australia, Australia
- Died: 18 June 1993 (aged 84) Claremont, Western Australia, Australia
- Resting place: Karrakatta Cemetery, Perth, Western Australia, Australia
- Spouse: Paul Hasluck (m. 1932; died 1993)
- Children: Nicholas Hasluck (son)
- Education: University of Western Australia
- Occupation: Writer and vice-regal wife

Dame Alexandra Margaret Martin Hasluck, Lady Hasluck, AD (née Darker; 26 August 1908 – 18 June 1993), also known as Alix Hasluck, was an Australian author and social historian. She published a number of works on the history of Western Australia. She was the wife of Sir Paul Hasluck, Governor-General of Australia.

== Early life ==
Hasluck was born on 26 August 1908 in North Perth, Western Australia. She was the only child of Evelyn Margaret (née Hill) and John William Darker. Her father was an engineer and her mother was one of the first female graduates of the University of Sydney. Her family had been established in Western Australia for four generations.

Hasluck attended Ormiston College from 1914 to 1918 and Perth College from 1919 to 1925. As a high school student her poetry was published in The Australasian. She went on to attend the University of Western Australia, graduating Bachelor of Arts in 1929. Hasluck was a sub-editor of the university magazine Black Swan and enrolled in an honours course, but had to discontinue her research on the Arthurian legend for financial reasons. She subsequently taught English and French at a small private school and later at St Hilda's Anglican School for Girls.

== Marriage and public life ==
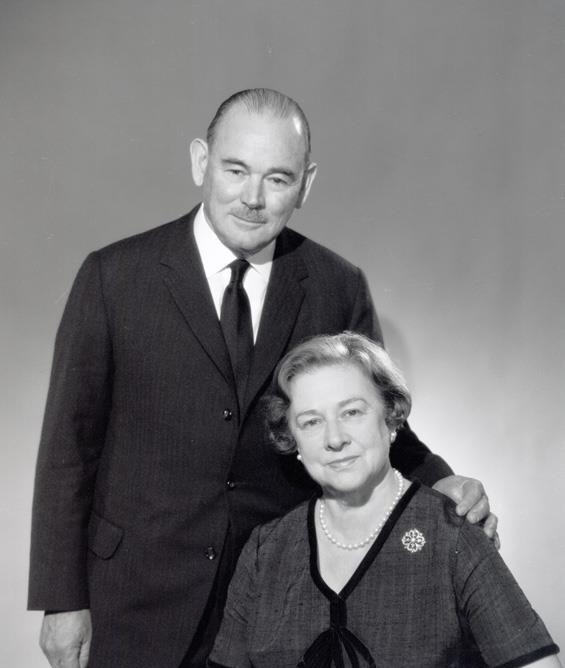
Alexandra Hasluck with her husband Paul in 1969.

In 1932, she married Paul Hasluck, who (as Sir Paul) was Governor-General of Australia 1969–1974. In 1974 he was offered an extension of his term by the Prime Minister, Gough Whitlam, and he was willing to serve an extra two years, but Lady Hasluck refused to remain at Yarralumla longer than the originally agreed five years and they returned to Perth. She was in poor health and their son Rollo had recently died. Whitlam then appointed Sir John Kerr. Historians of the period are certain that if Hasluck had still been Governor-General in 1975, as he would have been had his wife not intervened, the constitutional crisis of that year would have ended differently. Hasluck himself implied this in his book, The Office of Governor-General and also in the Queale Lecture.

In the 1978 Queen's Birthday Honours, Lady Hasluck was appointed the first Dame of the Order of Australia for "pre-eminent achievement in the fields of literature and history and for extraordinary and meritorious public service to Australia".

== Writing ==
Hasluck wrote poetry and prose from a young age. Her early interests included medieval England, and in the 1930s she wrote a historical novel titled Tudor Blood which was rejected for publication. She developed an interest in the history of Western Australia at university, which she shared with her husband, and in 1934 she replaced him as honorary secretary of the Western Australian Historical Society.

Hasluck published eleven books on history as well as a collection of short stories and an autobiography. Her works focused on the early colonial period of Western Australia and included full-length biographies of Georgiana Molloy (1955), Thomas Peel (1965), and Edmund Du Cane (1973), as well as shorter works on James Stirling and C. Y. O'Connor. Her 1959 book Unwilling Emigrants examined the convict era of Western Australia through a study of convict William Sykes. Her writing was targeted at general readers and "brought the history of Western Australia to a popular audience at a time when the State's historiography was in its infancy". In 1981, she published her autobiography, Portrait in a Mirror.

== Death ==
She died in 1993. She was buried at Karrakatta Cemetery in Perth.

Dame Alexandra and Sir Paul Hasluck are joint eponyms of the Western Australian Federal House of Representatives Division of Hasluck.

== Publications ==
- Georgiana Molloy: Portrait with Background (Melbourne: Oxford University Press, 1955)
- Unwilling Emigrants (London: Oxford University Press, 1959)
- Remembered With Affection (Melbourne: Oxford University Press, 1963; book design by Alison Forbes)
- Thomas Peel of Swan River (Melbourne: Oxford University Press, 1965)
- Audrey Tennyson's Vice-Regal Days (Canberra: National Library of Australia, 1978)
- Portrait in a Mirror (Melbourne: Oxford University Press, 1981)

== See also ==
- Spouse of the Governor-General of Australia
