= Northern Suburbs Crematorium =

Crematorium in Sydney, Australia

Northern Suburbs Crematorium, Sydney
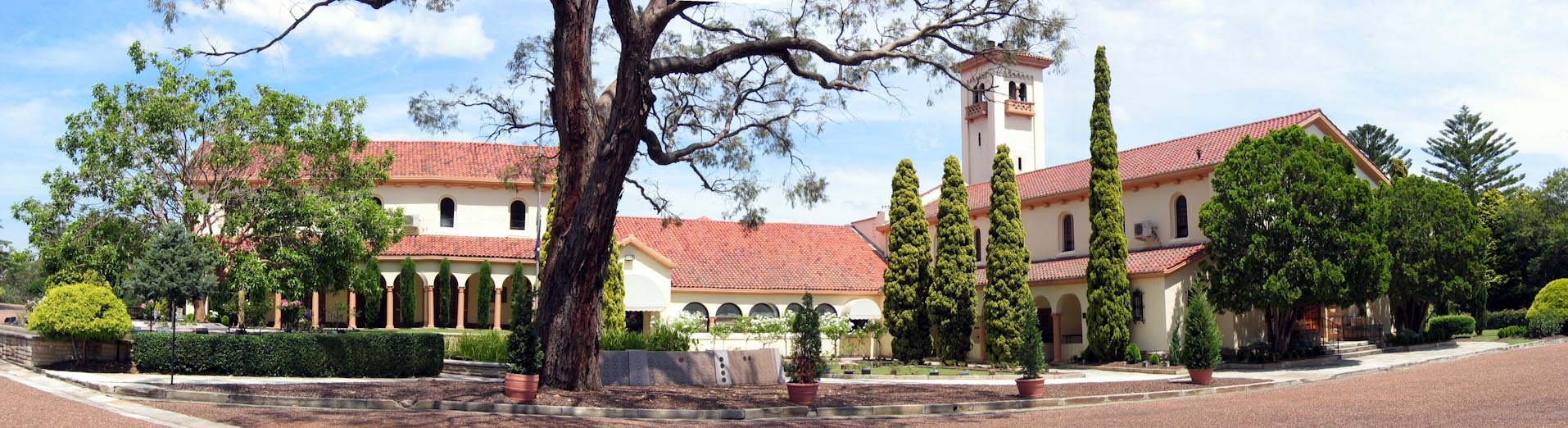
- Alternative names: Northern Suburbs Memorial Gardens and Crematorium

General information
- Location: Sydney, New South Wales, 199 Delhi Road, North Ryde
- Coordinates: 33°47′42″S 151°09′11″E
- Opened: 1933

Website
- www.northernsuburbscrem.com.au

The Northern Suburbs Crematorium, officially Northern Suburbs Memorial Gardens and Crematorium, is a crematorium in North Ryde, Sydney, Australia. It was officially opened on 28 October 1933, and the first cremation took place on 30 October 1933.

Northern Suburbs Crematorium was the second crematorium in New South Wales. It was designed by Frank I'Anson Bloomfield (1879–1949), who was cremated there, and also designed NSW and Sydney's first crematorium at Rookwood Cemetery. Bloomfield designed both places with a view to an authentic florentine feel. The grounds feature Art Deco statues, Royal Doulton tiles, classic iron work and other period features. The Memorial Gardens is a heritage listed site and often features in historical tours of Sydney and the North Shore.

In 2012 a new Function Centre was opened by the Governor of New South Wales, Marie Bashir.

== Notable interments ==
The cremated remains of notable persons located at Northern Suburbs Crematorium include:

- Jack Baddeley, 2nd Deputy Premier of New South Wales
- Garfield Barwick, 7th Chief Justice of Australia and politician
- Harry Scott Bennett, radical
- Nigel Bowen, Australian Attorney-General, Minister for Foreign Affairs and Chief Justice of the Federal Court of Australia
- Joseph Cook, 6th Prime Minister of Australia
- Dame Mary Cook, Spouse of the Prime Minister of Australia
- Talbot Duckmanton, former General Manager of Australian Broadcasting Corporation
- Pat Hills, 6th Deputy Premier of New South Wales and 69th Lord Mayor of Sydney
- Samuel Hordern, businessman and namesake of the Hordern Pavilion
- Stuart Inder, journalist
- Frederick Kneeshaw, politician
- William McKell, 12th Governor General of Australia and 27th Premier of New South Wales
- Bill Northam, Olympic yachtsman and businessman
- John Northcott, 30th Governor of New South Wales
- Jean Page, second wife of Prime Minister Earle Page
- Banjo Paterson, poet
- William Pettingell, businessman
- Charles Rosenthal, soldier and politician
- Percy Spender, politician
- Arthur Sullivan, A.I.F. VC recipient, Russian Civil War – previously cremated Golders Green Crematorium, London, ashes rest near Tree 267A, North section.
- Vernon Treatt, 17th Leader of the Opposition of New South Wales
- Gordon Wallace, 1st President of the New South Wales Court of Appeal
- Edward Warren, politician
- Chris Watson, 3rd Prime Minister of Australia
- Reginald Weaver, 16th Leader of the Opposition of New South Wales
- Eric Woodward, 31st Governor of New South Wales
- William Yeo, soldier
- Ada Baker, soprano and singing teacher

== Notable cremations ==
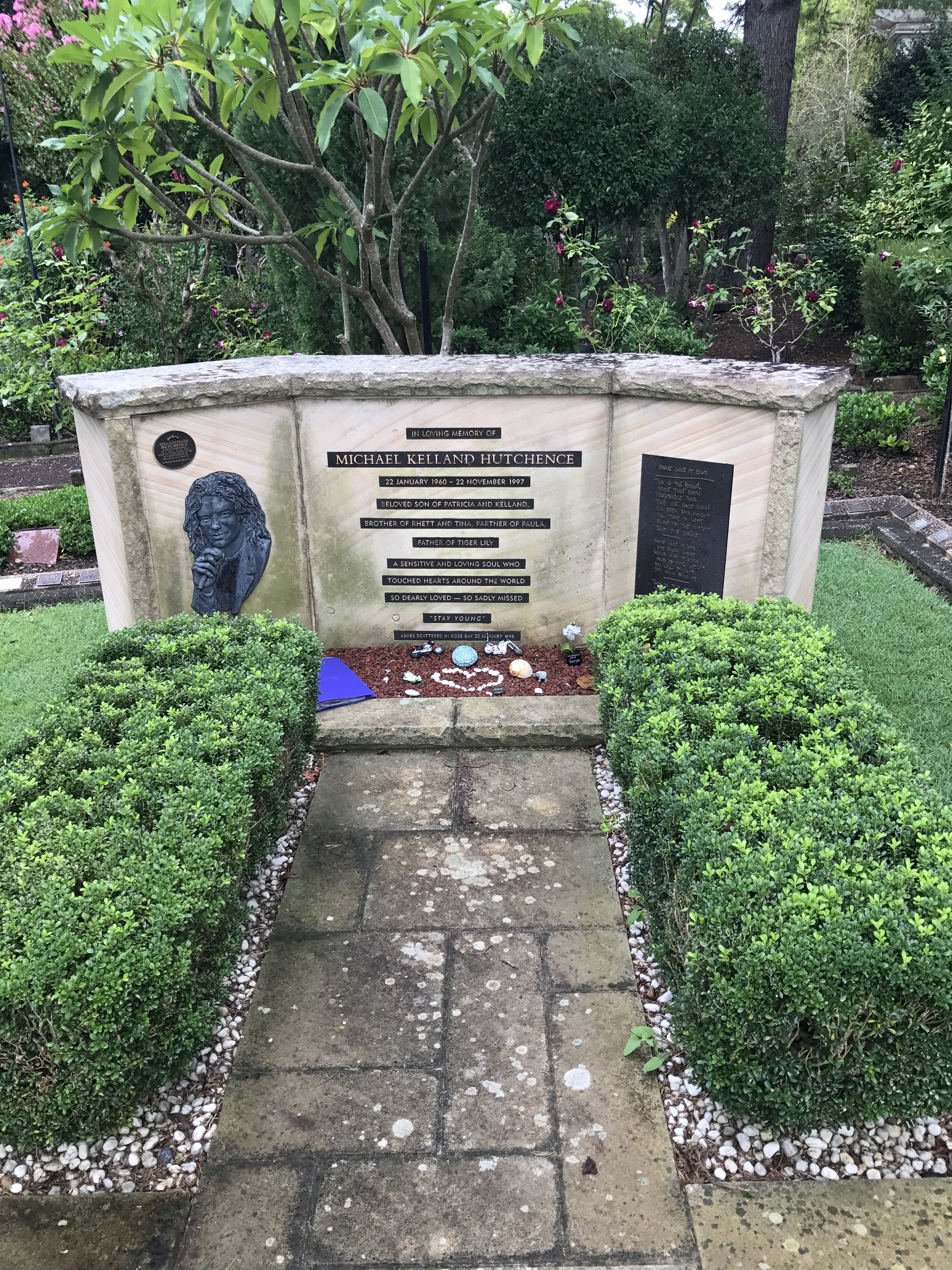
Hutchence memorial in the North Terrace of the park.

Cremations of notable people at the Northern Suburbs Crematorium include:

- Sid Barnes, cricketer
- Thomas Bavin, Premier of New South Wales
- George Cartwright VC recipient, World War I
- Neville William Cayley, writer, artist and ornithologist
- Frank Chaffey, soldier and New South Wales politician
- Vere Gordon Childe, archaeologist and philologist
- Charmian Clift, novelist
- William Crowle, businessman and philanthropist
- Slim Dusty, country singer
- Hughie Edwards, VC recipient World War II and Governor of Western Australia – ashes buried Karrakatta Cemetery, Perth, Western Australia
- Arthur Evans, Lincolnshire Regiment VC recipient World War I – ashes buried Lytham St Annes, England
- May Gibbs, author
- Barry Humphries, impressionist (creator of character Dame Edna Everage) - ashes scattered in undisclosed place
- Michael Hutchence, INXS lead singer
- Alison Kerr, first wife of Sir John Kerr
- Andrew Olle, journalist
- Frank Packer, media mogul - ashes buried at South Head Cemetery
- Banjo Paterson, poet
- Mervyn Victor Richardson, Victa lawnmower inventor
- Lindsay Gordon Scott, architect
- James Joynton Smith, Lord Mayor of Sydney
- Edward Joseph Tait, theatre entrepreneur
- Arkie Whiteley, actress

Commemorated by the Commonwealth War Graves Commission are 64 Commonwealth service personnel and a Dutch merchant seaman who were cremated here during World War II.
