= Spouse of the governor-general of Australia =

The spouse of the governor-general of Australia (or vice-regal spouse) generally assists the governor-general in welcoming ambassadors and foreign dignitaries and their spouses, and in performing their other official duties. The governor-general's spouse traditionally participates in celebratory occasions and state visits and trips, attends social and state functions and major events, often to accompany the governor-general, and, as a patron of various voluntary associations in their own right, works to promote the activities of those associations. These activities do not have an official status, and the vice-regal spouse is not remunerated directly by the Commonwealth Government—spouses and families of the governor-general indirectly benefit through the package of income and benefits received by the governor-general (including to reside in the vice-regal residences in Yarralumla and Kirribilli). Simeon Beckett SC is the spouse of Sam Mostyn AC, who became governor-general on 1 July 2024.

Both the governor-general and spouse are entitled to the style of address "Her/His Excellency" during the governor-general's term of office, but not thereafter. Governors-general, but not spouses, are entitled to the additional style "The Honourable" for life.

Most Australian governors-general have been men; as of 2025 Dame Quentin Bryce and Sam Mostyn are the only exceptions. Michael Bryce, husband of Dame Quentin Bryce, and Simeon Beckett, spouse of Sam Mostyn, are the only two male spouses, and there has not been an appointment of a governor-general with a same-sex spouse.

Every governor-general has, at the time of appointment, been in a spousal-type relationship. No governor-general has been single for the whole of their time in office, but two spouses died during their husband's governor-general term: Jacqueline Sidney, Viscountess De L'Isle, wife of William Sidney, 1st Viscount De L'Isle (1962); and Alison, Lady Kerr, wife of Sir John Kerr (1974). Kerr remarried during his term; De L'Isle remarried after his term had finished.

The longest-serving spouse has been Zara Hore-Ruthven, Countess of Gowrie, spouse of the longest-serving governor-general, Alexander Hore-Ruthven, 1st Earl of Gowrie, who served nine years from 1936 to 1945. The shortest-serving spouse was Alison Morrison, Viscountess Dunrossil, wife of William Morrison, 1st Viscount Dunrossil until he died in office in 1961, one year and one day after his commencement. Dunrossil is the only governor-general to have died while in office; Viscountess Dunrossil lived until 1983. Many spouses of governors-general have operated largely in 'behind-the-scenes' or spousal-support roles, providing the office-holder with companionship, counsel and support as they serve out their terms. Some have stayed out of the limelight and have thus remained unknown to the Australian public. However, some have been notable in their own right, and many have used their time to contribute significantly to the Australian community, to the work of Government House, and through it to the government of the nation.

Short biographical details of each spouse and details of their terms in office are shown in the following table; longer Wikipedia articles are hyperlinked where available.

== List of spouses of governors-general of Australia ==
Governor-General	Term start	Term end	Spouse	Born	Died	Notes
John Hope, 7th Earl of Hopetoun (later 1st Marquess of Linlithgow)	1 January 1901	9 January 1903	Hersey Hope, Countess of Hopetoun	31 March 1867	3 April 1937	Hope was the daughter of Dayrolles Eveleigh-de-Moleyns, 4th Baron Ventry. She became the Marchioness of Linlithgow on 27 October 1902, after the Hopetouns had left Australia (17 July) but while her husband was still formally the governor-general.
Hallam Tennyson, 2nd Baron Tennyson	9 January 1903	21 January 1904	Audrey, Lady Tennyson	19 August 1854	7 December 1916	After Lady Tennyson's death in 1916, Lord Tennyson married again in 1918. Her diaries Audrey Tennyson's Vice-Regal Days were edited by Alexandra Hasluck, the spouse of a later governor-general, Paul Hasluck.
Henry Northcote, 1st Baron Northcote	21 January 1904	9 September 1908	Alice, Lady Northcote	?	1 June 1934	Lady Northcote was the adopted daughter of George Stephen, 1st Baron Mount Stephen. She was the first Patron of the Melbourne Symphony Orchestra. She was created a Companion of the Order of the Crown of India in 1878, and a Dame Commander of the Order of the British Empire in 1919.
William Ward, 2nd Earl of Dudley	9 September 1908	31 July 1911	Rachel Ward, Countess of Dudley CBE	8 August 1868	26 June 1920	Lady Dudley was instrumental in setting up the state-based Bush Nursing Scheme. She drowned while swimming off the coast of Ireland, aged 51, in 1920. In 1924, Lord Dudley remarried, to Gertie Millar, a well-known actress and the widow of Lionel Monckton.
Thomas Denman, 3rd Baron Denman	31 July 1911	18 May 1914	Gertrude, Lady Denman	7 November 1884	2 June 1954	Lady Denman was active in women's rights issues including the promotion of women's suffrage in the United Kingdom. She named the city of Canberra and is commemorated in Lady Denman Drive in the national capital. In 1951, she was made a Dame Grand Cross of the Order of the British Empire (GBE).
Sir Ronald Munro Ferguson	18 May 1914	6 October 1920	Helen, Lady Munro Ferguson	1865	9 April 1941	Lady Munro Ferguson was the daughter of the Viceroy of India, Frederick Hamilton-Temple-Blackwood, 1st Marquess of Dufferin and Ava. She later became Viscountess Novar. She was appointed Dame Grand Cross of the Order of the British Empire (GBE) in 1918 for her wartime work with the British Red Cross.
Henry Forster, 1st Baron Forster	6 October 1920	8 October 1925	Rachel, Lady Forster	1870	12 April 1962	Lady Forster was the daughter of Henry Douglas-Scott-Montagu, 1st Baron Montagu of Beaulieu. The Rachel Forster Hospital for Women in Sydney was named after her. She was appointed Dame Grand Cross of the Order of the British Empire in 1926.
John Baird, 1st Baron Stonehaven	8 October 1925	21 January 1931	Sydney Baird, Lady Stonehaven	20 September 1874	21 September 1974	Lady Stonehaven was the daughter of Arthur Keith-Falconer, 10th Earl of Kintore. Following their departure from Australia, she became Viscountess Stonehaven. She acceded to the earldom of Kintore in her own right as the 11th Countess of Kintore in 1966. She died on the day after her 100th birthday, and at her death she was the oldest member of the House of Lords.
Sir Isaac Isaacs	21 January 1931	23 January 1936	Daisy, Lady Isaacs	1870	June 1960	Lady Isaacs had always been based in Melbourne, but relocated to Bowral, New South Wales after her husband's death.
Alexander Hore-Ruthven, 1st Baron Gowrie	23 January 1936	30 January 1945	Zara Hore-Ruthven, Lady Gowrie	20 January 1879	19 July 1965	Lady Gowrie was involved in the provision of child care, and the Lady Gowrie Child Centres were named in her honour. She later became Countess of Gowrie. From the 1930s she was instrumental in advancing the career of the opera singer Joan Hammond, whose final public performance was at Lady Gowrie's funeral.
Prince Henry, Duke of Gloucester	30 January 1945	11 March 1947	Alice, Duchess of Gloucester	25 December 1901	29 October 2004	The Duchess of Gloucester was an aunt of Elizabeth II. After her husband's death in 1974, she became known as Princess Alice, Duchess of Gloucester. She lived to age 102 and holds the record, previously held by Queen Elizabeth The Queen Mother, as the longest-lived person in the history of the British Royal Family.
Sir William McKell	11 March 1947	8 May 1953	Mary, Lady McKell	1893	July 1985	McKell was the eponym of the Lady McKell, a Sydney Harbour ferry which operated 1970–1993, and is now the Victoria Star, a luxury cruise ship operating in Melbourne.
Sir William Slim	8 May 1953	2 February 1960	Aileen, Lady Slim	1901	1993	Lady Slim later became Viscountess Slim.
William Morrison, 1st Viscount Dunrossil	2 February 1960	3 February 1961 (died)	Allison Morrison, Lady Dunrossil	?	26 March 1983	Lady Dunrossil was born Catherine Allison Swan. Lord Dunrossil was the only governor-general to die in office. Lady Dunrossil consequently became the shortest-serving spouse of a governor-general.
William Sidney, 1st Viscount De L'Isle	3 August 1961	7 May 1965	Jacqueline Sidney, Lady De L'Isle	20 October 1914	15 November 1962	Lady De L'Isle was the daughter of John Vereker, 6th Viscount Gort. She was a Senior Commander in the Auxiliary Territorial Service in World War II. She died in 1962, during her husband's term as governor-general. In 1966 he married Margaret Shoubridge.
Richard, Lord Casey	7 May 1965	30 April 1969	Maie, Lady Casey AC	13 March 1892	20 January 1983	Lady Casey was an aviator, writer, artist and opera librettist.
Sir Paul Hasluck	30 April 1969	11 July 1974	Dame Alexandra Hasluck AD	26 August 1908	18 June 1993	Lady Hasluck was a noted author, and editor of the diaries of one of her predecessors, Lady Tennyson. In 1978 she became the first Dame of the Order of Australia, and was known as Dame Alexandra Hasluck thereafter.
Sir John Kerr	11 July 1974	8 December 1977	1. Alison, Lady Kerr	29 July 1915	9 September 1974	The first Lady Kerr died less than two months after Kerr's appointment as governor-general. Seven months later he married Anne Robson, who was the first Australian to be appointed a Member of the International Association of Conference Interpreters.
Sir John Kerr	11 July 1974	8 December 1977	2. Anne, Lady Kerr	1914	16 September 1997	The first Lady Kerr died less than two months after Kerr's appointment as governor-general. Seven months later he married Anne Robson, who was the first Australian to be appointed a Member of the International Association of Conference Interpreters.
Sir Zelman Cowen	8 December 1977	29 July 1982	Anna, Lady Cowen AM	5 July 1925	10 June 2022	Lady Cowen was the cousin of politician Walter Jona
Sir Ninian Stephen	29 July 1982	16 February 1989	Valery Mary, Lady Stephen	4 July 1925	3 November 2019	née Sinclair
Bill Hayden	16 February 1989	16 February 1996	Dallas Hayden AM	28 September 1936	16 January 2024	née Broadfoot
Sir William Deane	16 February 1996	29 June 2001	Helen, Lady Deane	13 February 1936	living	She was educated at Kincoppal Convent in Sydney and Sydney University where she graduated in law. After graduation, she practised as a solicitor with the Sydney firm of Freehill, Hollingdale & Page.
Rev Peter Hollingworth	29 June 2001	28 May 2003	Ann Hollingworth	19 May 1936	13 April 2021	Ann Hollingworth worked as an obstetric physiotherapist, specialising in turn in geriatrics, women's health and orthopaedics, finally working at the Royal Brisbane and Women's Hospital. She retired from practice in 1998.
Michael Jeffery	11 August 2003	5 September 2008	Marlena Jeffery	1944	living	During her husband's numerous postings around Australia, to England and Papua New Guinea, Marlena Jeffery successfully lobbied for better housing and conditions for army families and established pre-school centres at Holsworthy and Enoggera Barracks. She was made a 'Citizen of Western Australia' for her work with charities during the years 1993–2000 when her husband was Governor of Western Australia. She was also appointed a Dame of Grace (DStJ) in the Order of St John.
Dame Quentin Bryce	5 September 2008	28 March 2014	Michael Bryce AM AE	21 June 1938	16 January 2021	Michael Bryce was a renowned graphic designer, whose work included the stylised "Opera House" logo for the Sydney 2000 Olympic Games. He was an adjunct professor of design at three tertiary institutions.
Sir Peter Cosgrove	28 March 2014	1 July 2019	Lynne, Lady Cosgrove	28 February 1948	living	née Payne
David Hurley	1 July 2019	1 July 2024	Linda Hurley	?	living	née McMartin
Sam Mostyn	1 July 2024	Incumbent	Simeon Beckett	?		Beckett is a barrister and, since 2022, a senior counsel.

== See also ==
- King consort
- Queen consort
- Spouse or partner of the prime minister of Australia
