= Macquarie Park Cemetery and Crematorium =

Cemetery in Sydney, Australia

- Grave of Prime Minister Billy Hughes
- Interactive map of Macquarie Park Cemetery and Crematorium

Details
- Established: 1922
- Location: Corner Delhi and Plassey Roads, Macquarie Park, New South Wales
- Country: Australia
- Coordinates: 33°47′26″S 151°08′22″E
- Type: Public
- Owned by: Government of New South Wales, NSW Department of Primary Industries
- Size: 59 acres (24 ha)
- Website: Macquarie Park Cemetery

Macquarie Park Cemetery and Crematorium, formerly Northern Suburbs General Cemetery, is a cemetery and crematorium in Macquarie Park, New South Wales in the Northern Suburbs of Sydney, Australia. The park caters for all religious, ethnic and cultural requirements.

== History ==
Macquarie Park is owned by the Government of New South Wales, administered by the NSW Department of Primary Industries through a Board of Trustees currently chaired by John Hewson. The cemetery and crematorium are managed by Northern Cemeteries, a not for profit organisation on Crown Land.

The Board of Trustees were the plaintiffs in the landmark Northern Suburbs General Cemetery Reserve Trust v Commonwealth High Court of Australia case in 1993.

With the introduction of the chapels and crematorium, the name of the park was changed in 2004 from Northern Suburbs General Cemetery to its current name.

== List of interments ==
Macquarie Park and Crematorium caters for both burials and the interment of ashes. The most notable interments are Sir John Kerr, Governor General of Australia whom dismissed the Whitlam government causing the 1975 Australian constitutional crisis; two former Prime Ministers of Australia, Billy Hughes and Bob Hawke as well as entertainers Johnny O'Keefe and Don Lane.

- Ward Austin, Australian radio DJ in the 1960s and 1970s
- Dame Heather Begg, opera singer
- Albert Bruntnell, politician
- Kathleen M. Butler, Godmother of Sydney Harbour Bridge
- Rob Guest, actor
- Bob Hawke, 23rd Prime Minister of Australia (half of Hawke's ashes are interred at Macquarie Park, the other half at Melbourne General Cemetery)
- Billy Hughes, 7th Prime Minister of Australia
- Dame Mary Hughes, spouse of Billy Hughes
- Lawrence Alexander Sidney Johnson, botanist
- Sir John Kerr, 18th Governor General of Australia and 13th Chief Justice of New South Wales
- Anne Kerr, Lady Kerr, wife of Sir John Kerr
- Don Lane, entertainer
- Raymond Longford, actor and director
- Lottie Lyell, actress
- Ricky May, entertainer
- AM Sir John McCauley, Chief of the Australian Air Force
- Johnny O'Keefe, entertainer
- Herbert Pratten, politician
- Jack Renshaw 31st Premier of New South Wales
- William Sandford, pioneer of the iron and steel industry
- Donald Shanks, opera singer
- Peter Sitsen, Netherlands East Indies colonial administrator
- Eric Spooner, politician
- Ethel Turner, writer
- Sir Cyril Walsh, Justice of the High Court of Australia
- Francis Webb, poet
- Maj. Gen. Sir George Wootten, soldier
- Liang Yusheng (Chen Wentong), writer

The cemetery contains the war graves of 73 Commonwealth service personnel from the Second World War.

== Gallery ==
Graves of Billy, Dame Mary and Helen Hughes

Graves of Maj. Gen. Sir George and Lady Wootten

Graves of Sir John and Lady Kerr

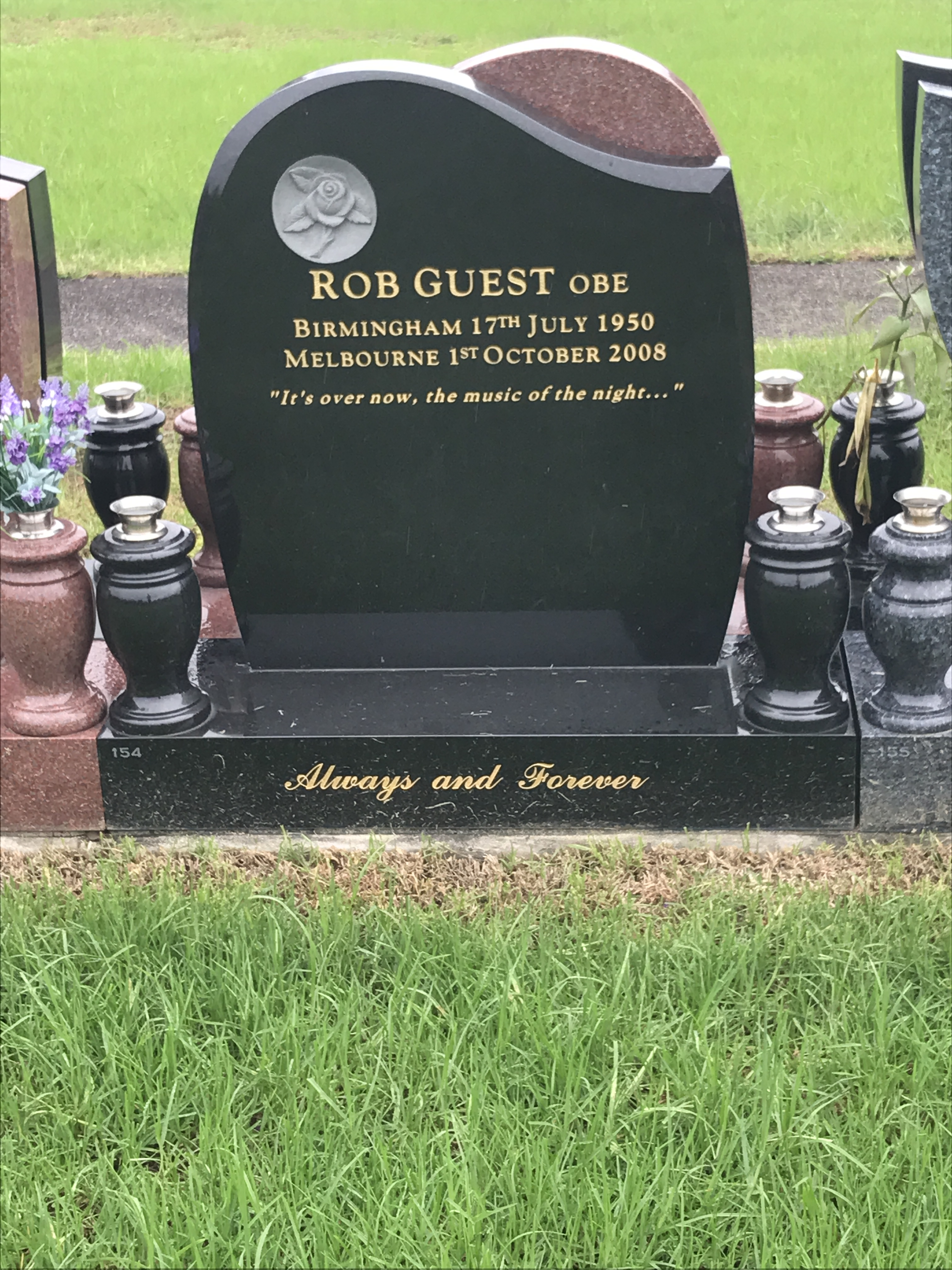
Grave of Rob Guest

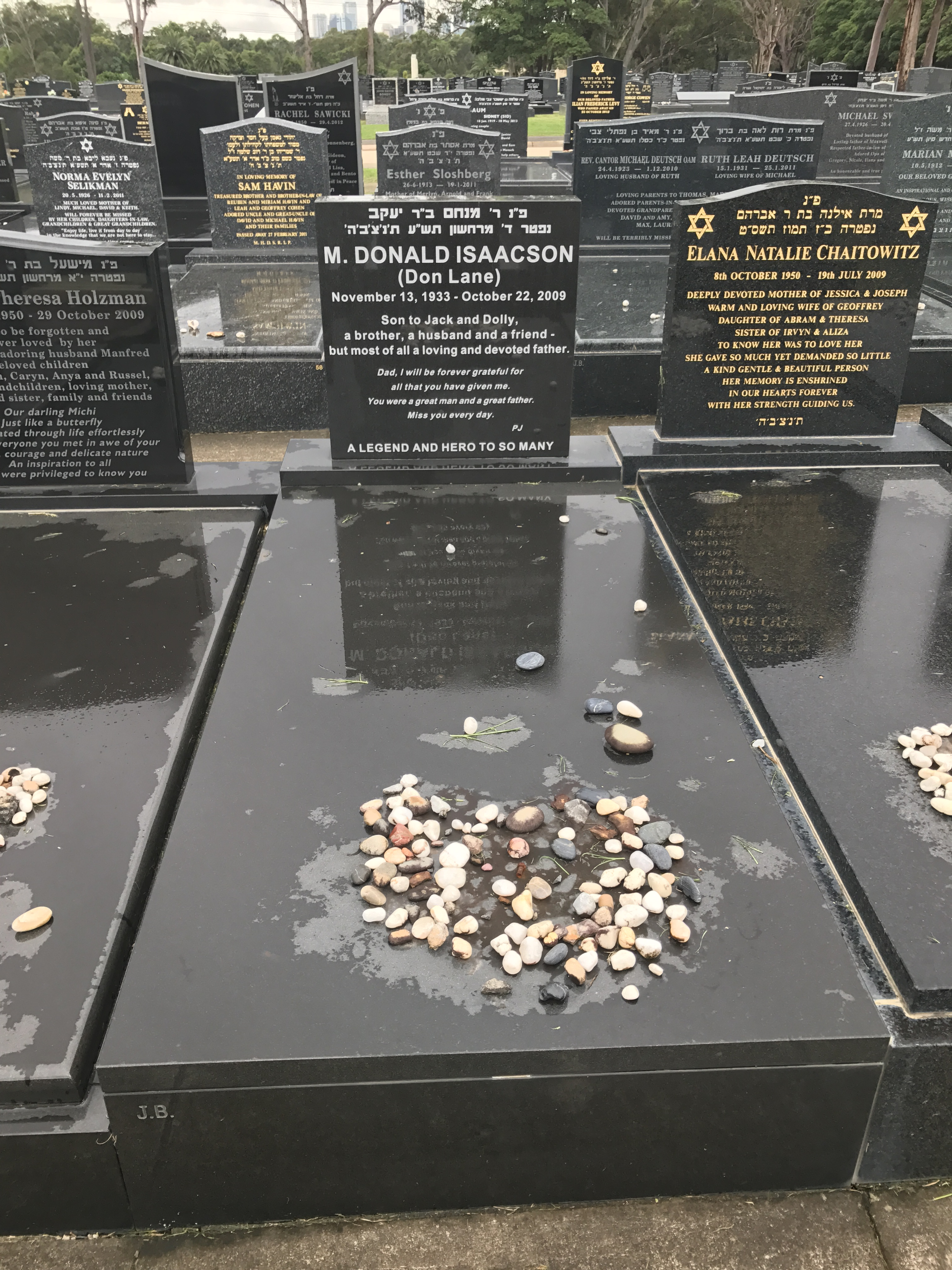
Grave of Don Lane

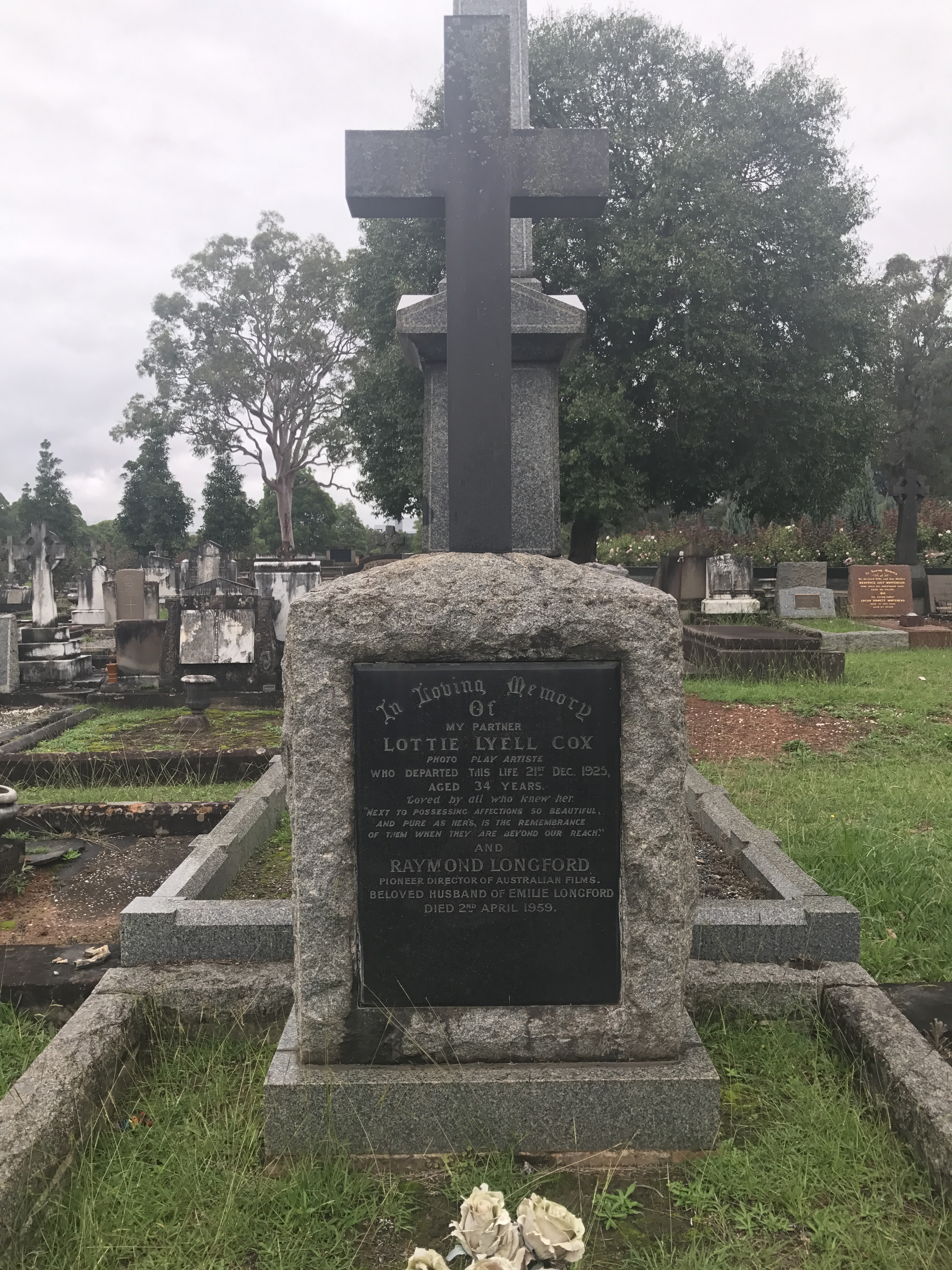
Grave of Lottie Lyell Cox

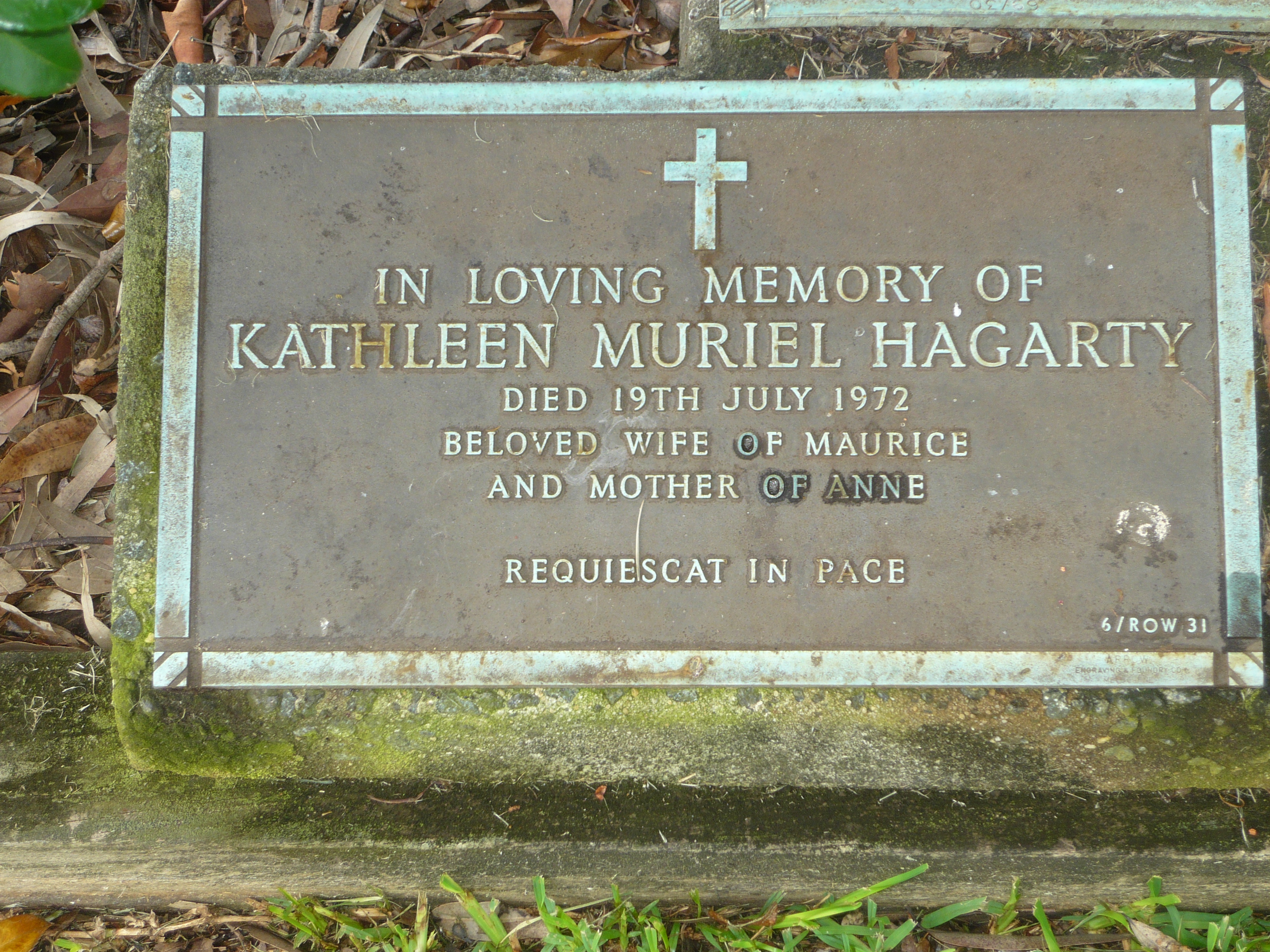
Grave of Kathleen M. Butler
