= Anne, Lady Kerr =

Australian vice-regal spouse (1914–1997)

Spouse of the governor-general of Australia
- In office 29 April 1975 – 8 December 1977
- Monarch: Elizabeth II
- Governor General: Sir John Kerr
- Preceded by: Alison, Lady Kerr
- Succeeded by: Anne, Lady Cowen

Personal details
- Born: Anne Dorothy Taggart; 1914 Australia
- Died: 1997 (aged 83)
- Spouse(s): Hugh Robson (m. 1941; div. 1975) John Kerr (m. 1975; died 1991)
- Education: University of Sydney
- Occupation: Public servant Vice-regal wife

Anne, Lady Kerr (née Taggart, previously Robson; 1914 – 16 September 1997) was the second wife of Sir John Kerr, Governor-General of Australia (1974–1977). They were married in 1975 during his term of office, six months after the death of his first wife Alison.

== Biography ==
Anne Dorothy Taggart was born in 1914. She was known as Nancy to her friends. She was an honours graduate from the University of Sydney. In 1935 she was awarded a French Government travelling scholarship and gained her Master of Arts from the Sorbonne, Paris. She appeared as an official French-English interpreter at more than 30 international conferences over ten years, including Colombo Plan meetings. On one occasion she interpreted for Jawaharlal Nehru at a United Nations human rights seminar in New Delhi. She was also fluent in German.

In 1941 she married Hugh Walker Robson QC, a barrister, who was appointed to the bench in 1970. He was Judge of the New South Wales District Court and Chairman of the Court of Quarter Sessions. They had a son and a daughter. At one time he had made a bid for Liberal Party preselection for the federal seat of Warringah.

In 1946 Anne Robson was appointed a fellow in Colonial Administration with the Australian School of Pacific Administration, where she first worked alongside John Kerr.

She also acted as an interpreter for the Department of External Affairs for visiting French delegations. During 1963 she taught French at North Sydney Boys High School in Sydney. In 1966 she was the first Australian to become a member of the International Association of Conference Interpreters.

Her marriage to Hugh Robson was dissolved in early 1975. It was reported that "strings had been pulled" to ensure her quick divorce from Robson and an avoidance of publicity. On 29 April 1975, in the Scots Kirk, Mosman, she married her old friend Sir John Kerr, by now the Governor-General, becoming the second Lady Kerr; Sir John was a widower, his first wife Alison having died aged 59 on 9 September 1974, two months after he took up the post at Yarralumla.

As Lady Kerr, she forged a formidable reputation for snobbery: in private, Gough Whitlam called her 'Fancy Nancy'. He once corrected her French on a menu, which led Margaret Whitlam to later say, only half jokingly, that he had sealed his fate by it. After his dismissal, Whitlam also referred to her as "the Lady Macbeth of Yarralumla". She insisted on being addressed 'Your Excellency', and reinstated the requirement for women to curtsy to her, which the previous Lady Kerr had dispensed with. A memorandum by Sir Paul Hasluck, which recorded a conversation with the Queen's Private Secretary, Sir Martin Charteris, alleged the Palace's disillusionment with the couple, and belief that "the Kerrs, and especially Lady Kerr, were ‘very greedy’ ".

She was privy to her husband's thoughts and anxieties as the 1975 constitutional crisis developed, but in his autobiography Matters for Judgement (1978) Sir John Kerr strongly denied she had either dissuaded him from warning the Prime Minister Gough Whitlam that he was going to dismiss him, or that she herself had a political axe to grind. However, Paul Kelly claims that she was shown the draft dismissal letter on the morning of 11 November, and that the sentence "It is for the people now to decide the issue, which the two leaders have failed to decide" was added at her suggestion.

The Kerrs moved to England in 1977 after the widespread public criticism of his acceptance of the ambassadorship to UNESCO, a post he was forced to relinquish before taking it up.

Lanterns over Pinchgut: A Book of Memoirs was published in 1988, in which she describe her extensive international experience.

Lady Kerr died in 1997 after a long battle with cancer. She was survived by her two children and four grandchildren and is buried beside her husband at Macquarie Park Cemetery and Crematorium.

== See also ==
- Spouse of the governor-general of Australia

== Sources ==
- Brilliant mind and charming manner, Norman Abjorensen, Canberra Times, 20 September 1997
- Obituary: Lady Kerr, Sydney Morning Herald, 20 September 1997.
- National Library of Australia: Hugh Robson interviewed by John Farquharson in the Law in Australian Society oral history project
