= Unwilling Emigrants =

1959 book by Alexandra Hasluck

- Author: Alexandra Hasluck
- Language: English
- Genre: Non-fiction
- Publisher: Oxford University Press
- Publication date: 1959

Unwilling Emigrants is a book by Alexandra Hasluck. It is both a general study of Western Australia's convict era, and a biography of a particular convict, William Sykes. First published in 1959 by Oxford University Press in Melbourne, it was for many years the only published history of the era. One of eleven books that Hasluck wrote, it was republished in 1991 by Fremantle Arts Centre Press.

It also was produced in other formats.

== Selected publications ==
- Hasluck, Alexandra (1959). Unwilling Emigrants: A study of the convict period in Western Australia. Melbourne: Oxford University Press. LCCN 61065535. OCLC 460594009. OL 5842666M. Wikidata Q7897821.
- Hasluck, Alexandra (1991) [1959]. Unwilling Emigrants. Fremantle: Fremantle Arts Centre Press. ISBN 0-949206-94-6. OCLC 23924058. OL 49834677M.

== General references ==
- Hasluck, Alexandra (1991). Unwilling Emigrants. Fremantle Art Centre Press. ISBN 978-1-86368-395-1.
