= Alison, Lady Kerr =

Australian vice-regal spouse

Spouse of the governor-general of Australia
- In office 11 July 1974 – 9 September 1974
- Monarch: Elizabeth II
- Governor General: Sir John Kerr
- Preceded by: Alexandra, Lady Hasluck
- Succeeded by: Anne, Lady Kerr

Personal details
- Born: Alison Worstead; 29 July 1915 Molong, New South Wales, Australia
- Died: 9 September 1974 (aged 59) Sydney, New South Wales, Australia
- Spouse: John Kerr (m. 1938; died 1991)
- Education: University of Sydney
- Occupation: Vice-regal wife

Alison, Lady Kerr (née Worstead; 29 July 1915 – 9 September 1974) was the first wife of Sir John Kerr, who was Governor-General of Australia from 1974 to 1977. She was a marriage guidance counselor and administrator prior to his appointment. She died soon into Kerr's term at Yarralumla, and he remarried a few months later.

== Biography ==
Alison Worstead was born in 1915 in Molong, New South Wales. She was known as "Peggy" to her family and friends. She had a brother named Victor, who predeceased her, as did her parents, Frederick Oscar (formerly Wehrstedt) and Florence Ophelia (née Jones).

She was educated at Domremy Convent, Five Dock, Sydney and gained a Diploma of Social Studies at the University of Sydney. A fellow student there was Margaret Dovey, who became a close lifelong friend and later married Gough Whitlam.

Peggy Worstead married John Kerr on 4 November 1938, in St James' Church, King St, Sydney, the same year in which he was admitted to the New South Wales Bar. In 1939 the first of their three children, Gabrielle, was born. During World War II she worked with the Family Welfare Bureau and the Australian Imperial Forces Women's Association, and later Secretary of the Hospital Almoners' Institute. In 1945 her daughter Kristin was born, and in 1949 her son Philip.

In 1954 she was invited to become a marriage guidance counsellor, by the Rev W. G. Coughlan, the founder and first director of the Marriage Guidance Council of New South Wales. She did this work for ten years, later becoming a member of the council's executive committee (1964–65; her husband was President of the Marriage Guidance Council 1962–63).

In 1965 she suffered a stroke occasioned by a subarachnoid haemmorhage, which paralysed her left side and left her with a speech disability. However, she rose above these challenges to continue her work as a marriage guidance counsellor and to serve on Lifeline's Adoption Committee. When her husband became Chief Justice and Lieutenant-Governor of New South Wales, she often assumed the role of spouse of the acting Governor.

John Kerr was knighted in the New Year's Honours of 1974, and his wife became Lady Kerr. Shortly before his appointment as Governor-General of Australia was announced on 27 February 1974, she had had a serious fall which sprained an ankle and fractured a wrist. Shortly after the announcement she was diagnosed with a serious illness (the exact nature of which was not publicly revealed), but she was well enough to travel to London for Sir John and her to be received by the Queen.

Upon her husband's swearing-in as Governor-General on 11 July 1974, they took up residence in Government House, Canberra. But her illness caused her to be admitted to hospital in Sydney on 22 July and again on 29 August. Between treatments she returned to Admiralty House, and Sir John Kerr transferred some engagements there so that he could be close to her. On 9 September 1974 she died in the Royal Prince Alfred Hospital in Sydney. She was cremated at the Northern Suburbs Crematorium later the same day, following a private service at St James Church. A public memorial service was held on 12 September at St James Church.

There were formal tributes to Lady Kerr in the Australian Parliament and the New South Wales Parliament.

She was survived by her husband and three children: Gabrielle Kibble, a town planner and later NSW State Director of Planning; Kristin Johnson, a psychiatrist; and Philip Kerr, a solicitor.

Sir John Kerr remarried in April 1975, to Anne Robson. In her short time as a governor-general's spouse, Lady Alison Kerr had dispensed with the requirement for women to curtsey to her and her husband. Lady Anne Kerr reinstated the practice.

== See also ==
- Spouse of the Governor-General of Australia
