= Peter Sitsen =

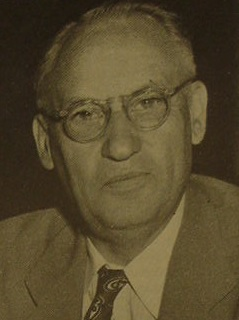
- Born: 1 November 1885; Bergen op Zoom, Netherlands
- Died: 21 January 1945 (aged 59); Sydney, Australia
- Other names: Petrus Hendrik Willem Sitsen
- Occupations: Military officer, building contractor, public servant
- Years active: 1907–1945

Petrus Hendrik Willem "Peter" Sitsen (1 November 1885 – 21 January 1945) was a military officer, building contractor and public servant in colonial Indonesia. He was the architect of Indonesia's industrialisation policies during 1937–1942 and 1946–1950.

== 1885–1911: Early life and military career ==
Sitsen was born in Bergen op Zoom on 11 January 1885 as the third of six children of Adrianus Wilhelmus Sitsen (1854–1900), a public school head master, and Maria Elisabeth van Mechelen (1856–1934). Sitsen completed high school in 1901 and continued studying engineering at the Royal Military Academy (KMA) in Breda.

After graduating, Sitsen left for Indonesia in January 1907 to serve his contract in the colonial army (KNIL). His first posting was as 2nd lieutenant in Kutaraja (now Banda Aceh) in Northern Sumatra. By 1910 he was stationed as 1st lieutenant in Batavia (now Jakarta).

== Marriage and artistic interests ==
In Jakarta, Sitsen met his wife, Dutch singer Maria Elizabeth (Marie) Russer (1884–1969) in 1910. Marie was a well-known soprano who sang at concerts in The Netherlands during 1904–1910. In 1910 she travelled with her friend, singer and pianist Annie van Velthuysen (1887–1965), to Singapore and Indonesia for a tour of concerts. Sitsen was Russer's piano accompanist at one of her performances in Jakarta.

Russer settled in Jakarta to teach singing. Her engagement to Sitsen was announced in May 1911 and they married on 12 October 1911. They had two sons, Adri (‘Ad’, 1912–1992) and Hendrik ('Henk', 1915–1916), and a daughter, Ellen (1917–1986).

Russer and Sitsen were active in the Fine Arts Society of the Dutch East Indies in Batavia (Nederlandsch-Indische Kunstkring Batavia), of which Sitsen was treasurer during 1912–1915 and a member of the committee that constructed the society's building (now Galeri Seni Kunstkring) in 1914. Russer performed at concerts in cities throughout Indonesia. As her accompanist, Sitsen sometimes sang with Russer at concerts. Together they performed with well-known Dutch singer and entertainer Jean-Louis Pisuisse during his tour of Indonesia in 1913. A newspaper review described the performance: ‘Sitsen has a good feeling for music, a lot of emotion and warmth, […] and not much of a voice’.

== 1912–1935: Surveyor in Jakarta, building contractor in Yogyakarta ==
Having served out his KNIL contract, Sitsen left the army in 1912 and became a senior land surveyor (rooimeester) with the Jakarta city council. He left the job in 1915 to take the position of Director of Public Works (Directeur van de Sultanaatswerken) in the Sultanate of Yogyakarta in Central Java.

In 1919 Sitsen partnered with Emile George Baruh Louzada (1886–1935) to establish the construction company N.V. Bouwkundig Bureau Sitsen en Louzada in Yogyakarta in 1919, and became a building contractor (bouwaannemer).

The Sitsen en Louzada company designed and constructed a wide range of private and public buildings and other structures in Central and East Java during the 1920s and early 1930s. For example, an electric power plant in Yogyakarta for the ANIEM (Algemeene Nederlandsch-Indische Electriciteits-Maatschappij) company and the bazaar building of Cilacap, one of the first all-concrete structures in Indonesia. The company was relatively successful, listing on the Surabaya stock exchange and raising a social capital of f 250,000, later increased to f 1 million. It paid dividends to shareholders of 8% (1923), 7% (1924) and 12.5% (1928).

== Life in Yogyakarta ==
Sitsen was president, then honorary commissioner, and then the first governor of the Yogyakarta chapter of the Rotary Club. Together with Sultan Hamengkubuwono VIII (1880–1939), Thomas Karsten (1884–1945) and Samuel Koperberg (1886–1957), Sitsen organised the Java Institute (Java Instituut) and its Sånå Boedåjåmuseum (now Museum Sonobudoyo) in Yogyakarta in 1931. The museum opened in 1935 and still houses many artefacts related to Central Java's rich history.

Sitsen and Russer were members of the local arts circle in Yogyakarta. Together they hosted a visit of German composer and painter Walter Spies in 1923. Russer organised the local choir and its performances. She directed a stage performance of Mozart’s opera the Marriage of Figaro.

The Sitsen en Louzada company experienced financial difficulties during the economic crisis of the early 1930s. It was liquidated in 1935, following the death of Louzada in January 1935.

== 1935–1942: Architect of Indonesia’s industrialisation policy ==
In 1935, Sitsen accepted a position at the Industry Section (Afdeeling Nijverheid) of what during the 1930s became the Department of Economic Affairs in Jakarta.

In 1937 Sitsen and Russer settled back in Jakarta, where they resumed their activities in the Batavia Kunstkring arts circle.

Sitsen's work initially focused on designing a policy for the development of small-scale industries. Following its presentation and discussion at the 1937 annual meeting of the Department’s senior officials, Sitsen published the policy principles for small scale industries in 1937. The implementation of this policy saw the start of the industrial extension service, organised by his colleague Pandji Soerachman Tjokroadisoerjo (1884–1952).

The principles that Sitsen developed underpinned Indonesia’s first industrial development plan in 1941. A key feature of the plan was the principle of a ‘balanced’ mutually supportive development of small-, medium- and large-scale industrial ventures, using protection, safeguards and encouragements for the development of small-scale industry. The policy focused on several industries that were labour-intensive and labour-absorbing, import-competitive and import-replacing.

== 1942–1945: Preparing Indonesia’s post-war economic recovery ==
Just before the surrender of the Dutch colonial government to the Japanese in March 1942, the colonial government ordered Sitsen to travel to Australia. He was to take part in what became the Netherlands East Indies Commission for Australia and New Zealand, effectively the Netherlands East Indies government-in-exile in 1943, located in Melbourne.

Sitsen's task was to prepare for the return of the colonial government to Indonesia after the Japanese occupation, and to prepare economic recovery of Indonesia. For that purpose he travelled across the Pacific to the USA. In New York, Sitsen was a member of the Dutch Commission for Economic and Financial Affairs for the Netherlands Indies, Surinam and Curaçao (Commissie voor Economische en Financiële Zaken van Nederlands-Indië, Suriname en Curaçao). He also was the leader of the Netherlands Indies delegation to the United Nations Relief and Rehabilitation Administration in the South-West Pacific (UNRRA).

At the Netherlands and Netherlands Indies Council of the Institute of Pacific Relations in New York, Sitsen created a world-first post-war aid and recovery plan for Indonesia and sought funding to start stockpiling materials. This was a 5-year plan with a total price tag of US$2.4 billion. As far as funds were available to the colonial government-in-exile, Sitsen used them to purchase and stockpile supplies of food, medical supplies and medical assistance, clothing and dwellings, and to invest in equipment and machinery necessary for the recovery of transport infrastructure, manufacturing industry, plantation agriculture, mining ventures etc.

== Death and honours ==
After completing his work in New York in September 1944, Sitsen was appointed Director of the Department of Public Works (Verkeer en Waterstaat) in the Netherlands Indies Civil Administration (NICA), the Netherlands East Indies government-in-exile located in Brisbane.

Sitsen returned to Australia in late-1944 to take up the appointment. During the journey across the Pacific he fell ill. He died in hospital soon after arrival in Sydney on 21 January 1945, at the age of 59. He was buried at Northern Suburbs Cemetery in Sydney.

In recognition for his work in Yogyakarta's society and business, Sitsen was made an Officer in the Order of Orange-Nassau in 1934. He was fondly remembered among Dutch exiles from colonial Indonesia in the USA.

== Sitsen’s legacy: Recovery and industrialisation after 1945 ==
The Sitsen economic recovery plan was put into action in 1944 and 1945. The Netherlands Indies Civil Administration had ample supplies, ready to be sent for relief to different parts of the Indonesian archipelago as soon as the Japanese were defeated. The plan provided for a meticulously planned distribution by island and by district of aid supplies. It was first rolled out in Eastern Indonesia, where it helped to relieve shortages, contributed to quick economic recovery during 1945 and normalised living conditions by 1946. By contrast, distribution of aid supplies in Java and Sumatra was confined to the Dutch-held urban footholds until July 1947 due to the war of independence.

An additional part of the plan was establishment of NIGIEO (Nederlandsch-Indische Gouvernements Import- en Export Organisatie) in March 1946. It monopolised imports and exports to be able to prioritise relief imports and the distribution of imported goods. The organisation was liquidated at the end of 1947, when Indonesia's exports increased and the need for foreign exchange rationing and relief imports decreased.

Sitsen's other legacy was the policy of support for small-scale industries in Indonesia. During 1946–1951 this policy morphed into a system of core enterprises that encouraged small-scale regionally diversified industrialisation, known in Indonesia since 1951 as the induk system. The system was successful on small scale. However, in the course of the 1950s, the Indonesian government under President Sukarno watered this policy down in favour of the development of large, often state-owned industrial enterprises.

== Sitsen’s publications ==
- (1922) Drinkwatervoorziening door Zuivering van Rivierwater [Potable water supply by purifying river water]. Weltevreden: Albrecht.
- (1937a) ‘De kleine nijverheid in de inheemse sfeer en hare- expansiemogelijkheden op Java’ [Small-scale indigenous manufacturing and its opportunities for expansion in Java], Djawa, 17: 137–200. Also published in Landbouw: Landbouwkundig Tijdschrift voor Nederlandsch-Indië, 13(7/8) 76–106.
- (1937b) ‘De nijverheid in Nederlandsch-Indië’ [Industry in the Netherlands Indies]. Economisch-Statistische Berichten, 22: 713–715.
- (1941a) ‘Industrie in Nederlandsch-Indië’ [Manufacturing industry in the Netherlands Indies], Economisch Weekblad voor Nederlandsch-Indië, special issue, 14–21.
- (1941b) ‘Volksinkomen en industrie’ [National income and manufacturing industry], Economisch Weekblad voor Nederlandsch-Indië, 1560–1561.
- (1943a), ‘Industrialization of the Netherlands Indies.’ In B. Landheer (ed.) The Netherlands. (Berkeley: University of California Press) 376–391.
- (1943b) ‘Modern industry in the Netherlands East Indies’, Nature, 151: 469–470.
- (1944a) The Industrial Development of the Netherlands Indies. New York: Institute of Pacific Relations. (First draft was a paper for the 8th meeting of the Netherlands and Netherlands Indies Council of the Institute of Pacific Relations in 1942.)
- (1944b) ‘Relief Program for the N.E.I.’, Far Eastern Survey, 13(7) 62–66.
- (1945) Relief, Rehabilitation and Economic Reconstruction in the Netherlands Indies. New York: Netherlands and Netherlands Indies Council, Institute of Pacific Relations. (Paper for the 9th meeting of the council of the Netherlands and Netherlands Indies Council of the Institute of Pacific Relations.)
