= William Sykes (convict) =

English convict

William Sykes (c. 1827 – 4 January 1891) was an English convict, transported to Western Australia for manslaughter.

== Early life ==
Sykes was born in Wentworth, near Rotherham, Yorkshire, England c. 1827. (Note: Various accounts give differing birth dates, in 1826, 1827 and 1828.) As a member of a poor family, he received no formal education, and took on paid work from an early age. In 1851, he was recorded as unmarried and working as a coal-pit trammer. In 1853, Sykes married Myra Wilcock, and over the next ten years they had four children. He was later employed as a puddler.

On 10 October 1865, Sykes went poaching with a group of six other men. Evidence suggests that Sykes had often poached in the past, but he had never been caught. On this night, the men were challenged by a group of gamekeepers, and in making their escape, Sykes and a number of other men assaulted one of the gamekeepers. The gamekeeper died from his injuries, and a reward was offered for information about the attack. Eventually, the government offered a free pardon to anyone willing to give evidence, whereupon one of the seven men, Robert Woodhouse, gave evidence against the other six. Four of the men, including Sykes, were found guilty of manslaughter, and received life sentences with a minimum of twenty years of penal servitude.

Sykes served the first nine months of his sentence in solitary confinement at Wakefield prison. He was then transferred to Portsmouth prison, and on 2 April 1867 boarded the Norwood for transportation to Western Australia. His brief diary of the voyage is extant.

== Western Australia ==
The Norwood arrived at Fremantle, Western Australia on 13 July. On arrival, Sykes was assigned a number, 9589, and recorded as "about five feet six and three-quarter inches in height, with light brown hair, grey eyes, an oval visage of light complexion, and in appearance healthy". Shortly afterwards he was sent to Bunbury to work on the roads. He worked in the district for seven years. He is then believed to have been sent to Newcastle (now Toodyay) around October 1875. By 1877, he had gained his ticket of leave, and was registered to work in the Toodyay district. He worked for a short time as a servant to the medical officer William Mayhew before working at various labouring jobs in the district, including grubbing, woodcutting, fencing, and well sinking. He apparently worked well until November 1879, but over the following three years, his record indicates that he was often fined for drunkenness.

A bout of severe illness in 1883 saw him in the Newcastle depot hospital for a month. He never fully recovered his health.

In 1885 he received his conditional release.

Sykes spent the last few years of his life working on the railway from Clackline to Newcastle. Late in December 1890, he was found lying ill in his hut on the Clackline railway; he was removed to Newcastle Hospital, where he was diagnosed as suffering from a hepatitic ulcer and chronic hepatitis. He died five days later on 4 January 1891 and was buried in a mass grave in the Toodyay cemetery. His few belongings, including an old gun and his dog, were sold to recoup the £2/15/- that it cost the government to provide the coffin.

== Legacy ==
Sykes may have remained a historically insignificant character, if not for the discovery in 1931 of a collection of letters written to him by his wife. The letters were found in a crevice during the demolition of old police buildings at Toodyay, and handed in to the Royal Western Australian Historical Society, which lodged them with the State Archives of Western Australia. Many years later, the social historian Alexandra Hasluck rediscovered the letters and researched Sykes. The results of her research were published as her 1959 book Unwilling Emigrants.
