= Ada Baker =

Australian soprano singer (1866–1949)

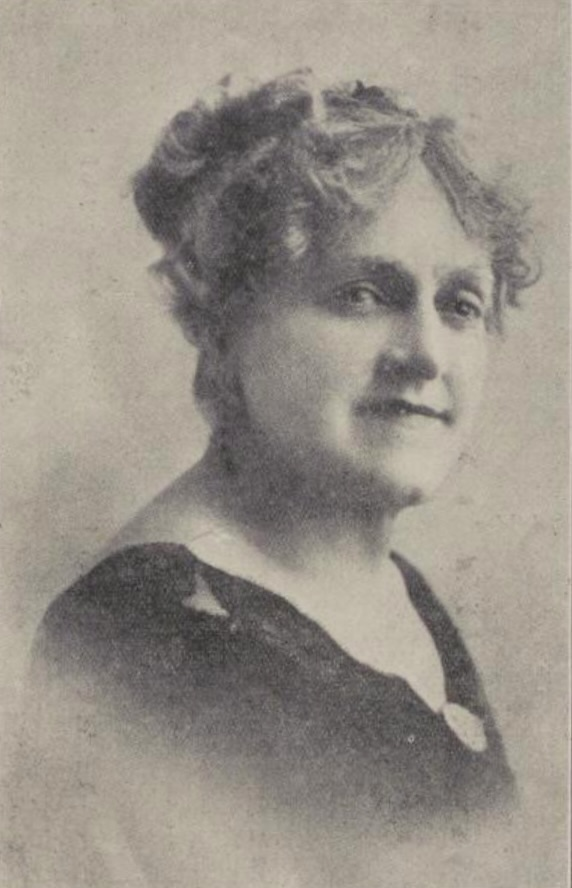
- Baker in 1926
- Born: Ada Winifred Weekes Baker; 11 December 1866; Strawberry Hills, Sydney, Colony of New South Wales
- Died: 24 July 1949 (aged 82); Pymble, New South Wales, Australia
- Burial place: Northern Suburbs Crematorium
- Other name: Ada Hall
- Occupation: Singing teacher
- Spouse: Charles Hall (m. 1887; separation 1897)
- Children: 2

Signature
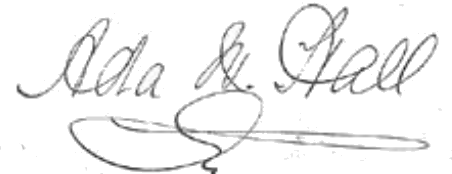

Ada Winifred Weekes Baker (11 December 1866 – 24 July 1949), known professionally as Madame Ada Baker, was an Australian soprano, vaudeville star and singing teacher. Born in Strawberry Hills, Sydney, she moved with her family to Wagga Wagga where she taught singing. Upon returning to Sydney she received further training under Albert Fisher. She debuted to much acclaim at the Promenade Concerts in 1886 at Surry Hills. She married Charles Hall, a law clerk, in 1887 and had two children. The couple filed for divorce in 1897, which was not granted, but they had already separated.

As part of the Willard Opera Company, Baker toured China and India in the early 1890s. Back in Sydney she joined Harry Rickards' vaudeville circuit. The company toured Western Australia in 1898, where Baker established herself in Perth as a singing teacher and performer. She moved back to Sydney in 1907 where she reestablished herself as a well-respected and influential singing teacher, and joined Sydney's musical society. Her influence as a teacher was such that she was later made vice-president of the Australian Music Teachers' Alliance. Baker also gave concerts and was a fund-raiser for charities, later becoming a life governor of the Rachel Forster Hospital. She continued teaching until a few months before her death at the age of 82.

== Early life and career ==
Baker was born on 11 December 1866 in Strawberry Hills as the ninth child of English-born parents: George Frederick Baker (c. 1827 – 1900), auctioneer, and Sarah Wilkinson Baker, née Epsley (died 1885). The family moved to Wagga Wagga where her father purchased the Pastoral Hotel and worked as its manager. When she was 12 she sang in Mendelsohn's Elijah with the Sydney Philharmonic Society under Henri Kowalski, and at 15 she started offering music classes to fund her own singing lessons in Sydney. In September 1884 she sang in the role of Lily in a cantata, Flower Queen, at the Freemason's Hall, Wagga Wagga alongside Charles Henry Hall, who sang as the Recluse. Later, in 1886, she held a concert, again at the Freemason's Hall, and raised £50 for Wagga hospital and £24/15/6 to the Lord Mayor of Sydney for survivors of the shipwreck of the Ly-ee-moon off the Green Cape Lighthouse.

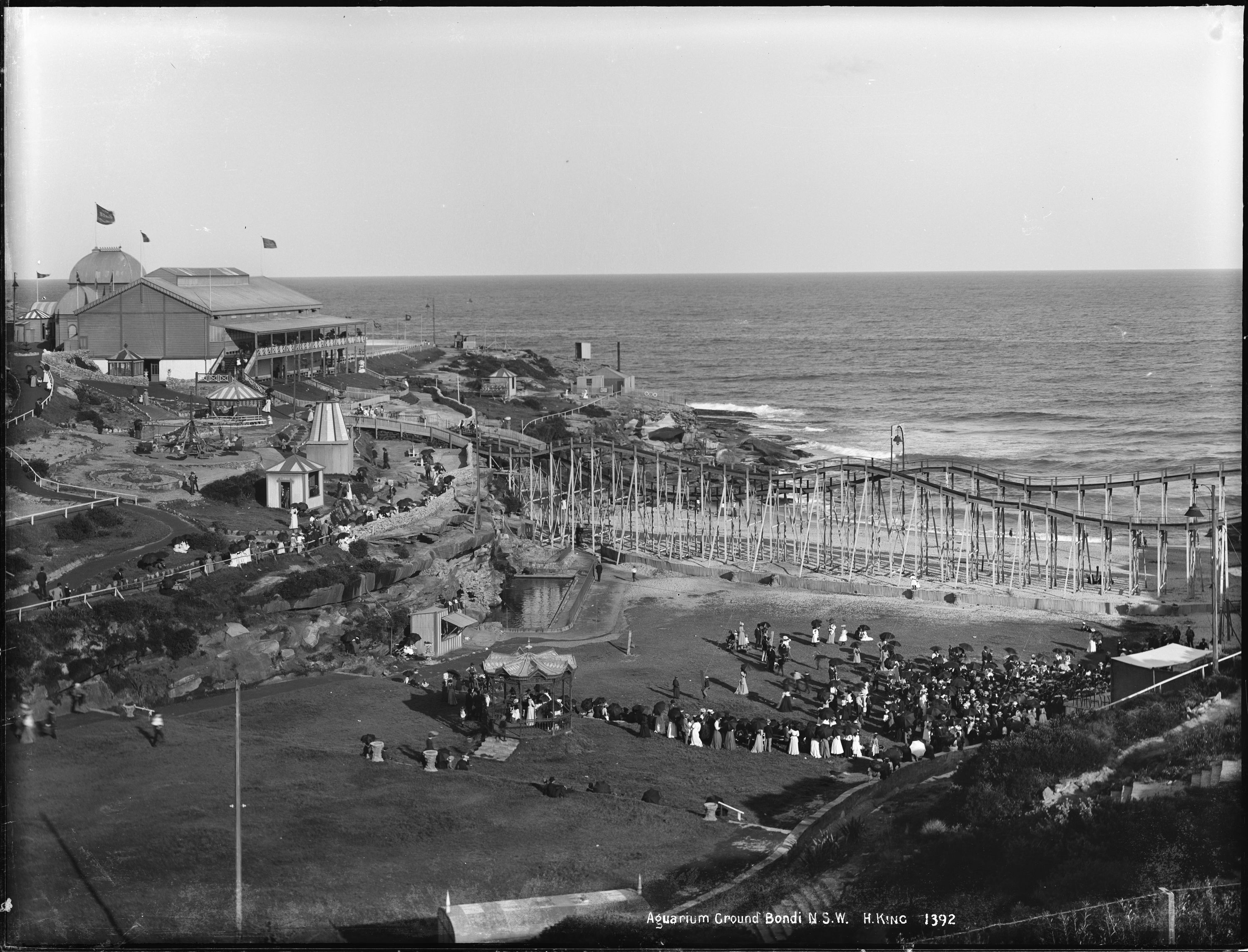
Bondi Aquarium c. 1891

Baker moved back to Sydney in late 1886 to have piano lessons with Victor Benvenuti and singing lessons by Albert Fisher. During the same year, she participated in a number of Promenade concerts, held at the Exhibition Building which was situated in Prince Alfred Park, Surry Hills. She received favourable reviews, with The Evening News writer praising her debut performance:

Miss Baker possesses a voice of rare quality, good range, and sings with the ease and grace of a natural artiste and a cultivated vocalist. Her style is marked by fascinating refinement, her intonation is perfect; her enunciation distinct, and as a ballad singer she bids fair to take place in the front rank of Australian vocalists.

She performed in another two concerts and for her second concert the Sydney Morning Herald reporter described: "The palm must be given to Miss Ada Baker, who appeared for the first time at these concerts. She possesses a voice of rich calibre; the lower notes are deliciously liquid, the upper ones of full power, so that she fills the building with ease."

Baker as a member of Harry Rickards' Company, Perth, July 1898. When the company returned to Sydney, Baker remained in Perth.

Baker married former castmate Hall, now a law clerk, on 23 April 1887 at the Congregational Church, Surry Hills. According to Baker, Hall had married her reluctantly as her brother threatened to "break his head" if he did not. The couple had two children: Beatrice in 1887 and Vera in 1889. Being married and a mother did not stop Baker from continuing as a teacher and performer. In 1887 she had sung in three concerts at Bondi Aquarium (at Tamarama). (Note: Contemporaneous records of these concerts are in advertisements: "Manly Aquarium". Advertising. The Sydney Morning Herald. 25 January 1887. p. 2.; "Manly Aquarium". Advertising. The Sydney Morning Herald. 15 February 1887. p. 2.; "Manly Aquarium". Advertising. The Sydney Morning Herald. 29 March 1887. p. 2.) In October 1890 she was in Henri Kowalski's "Grand Concert" at Centennial Town Hall as the lead soloist, singing Gioachino Rossini's "La Carita". She finished 1891 in the Christmas pantomime playing Zorilda in Sinbad the Sailor.

Between 1891 and 1893 Baker toured India and China with the Willard Opera Company, playing lead for three years in a series of Gilbert & Sullivan comic operas, and "created something of a stir in the part of Hollee Beebee" in a rival opera, The Nautch Girl. Decades later she recounted how she gave a concert to the Maharaja of Mysore (though she also stated that it was the Maharaja of Cooch Behar). She recalled that during the concert only six people were in the direct audience, and that though she could not see any women of the court she could hear them. She also claimed that after the concert she was granted the privilege of riding on the Maharaja's elephant.

Upon her return from overseas, Baker performed in a hospital benefit at the School of Arts in North Sydney, and in August 1894 joined Harry Rickards' vaudeville company at the Tivoli Theatre. She applied for divorce from Hall in 1897, on the grounds of desertion since 1891. During the court case, her lawyer revealed that Hall had been convicted of embezzlement and imprisoned. She had continued her teaching and singing after the wedding and claimed that Hall had not financially supported her nor their children. It was alleged by Hall's lawyers that Baker had committed adultery with her castmate Harry Fitzmaurice, which she denied. The judge found that there was no evidence of desertion and no evidence that Baker had been unfaithful to her husband, so dismissed the case. In the era of at-fault divorce–Australian enacted no fault-divorce in 1975–if neither party could prove fault in the marriage by the other, then it would not be granted. (Note: Under the Matrimonial Causes Act 1959, a couple could get divorced for one of 14 reasons: adultery; desertion; refusal to consummate the marriage; cruelty, rape, sodomy or bestiality; drunkardness or drug-abuse; imprisonment for over three years with no spousal support provided; imprisonment for the death penalty; conviction for attempted spousal murder; refusal to pay maintenance; refusal to decree of restitution of conjugal rights; insanity; separation for more than five years; and reasonable belief that one spouse had died. Before this, the colony had been forbidden to grant divorces until, in 1852 (and only several years before Baker applied for her divorce), the colonial parliament passed the Matrimonial Causes Act (also known as 36 Vic. No. 9)—with royal assent in 1953—that allowed the Supreme Court to dissolve marriages under limited circumstances. See Bennett, J. M. (1963). "The establishment of divorce laws in NSW" (PDF). Sydney Law Review. 54 (2) (5th ed.): 241–248.) Baker and Hall never formally divorced although they remained separated. Hall died in 1937 in Perth.

== Move to Western Australia ==
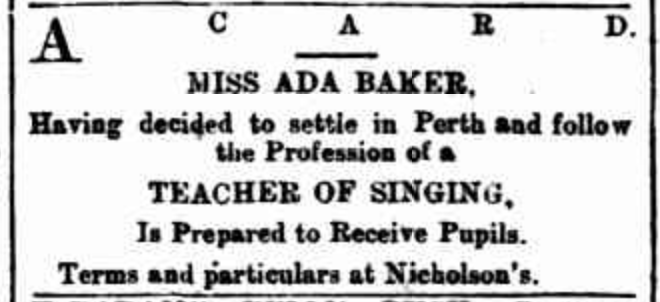
Advertisement announcing Ada Baker's intentions to stay in Perth to teach singing.

During July and August 1898 Rickards' Tivoli company, including Baker, toured in Western Australia. When the company returned to Sydney, Baker remained in Perth. There she worked as a singing teacher, and performed with the Lyric Club, the Fremantle Orchestral Society and the Perth Musical Union.

Baker, in December 1898, sued the proprietors of The Continental Gardens, who arranged performances in the Hotel Continental as well as tours outside of Perth, for £5 over lost wages. The case centred around her assertion that when signing her contract for performances she had told them she could not travel. However the company advertised performances at the goldfields in the Kalgoorlie and Coolgardie regions with Baker prominently billed. When Baker learned of this, she produced a medical certificate testifying she was too sick to travel. She denied knowing what opposing counsel meant when they said she refused to go because of "a Coolgardie or Kalgoorlie reason". The defendants counter-claimed that Baker knew of the travel arrangements and her non-attendance resulted in financial and reputational disadvantage. They produced a witness who said that Baker had said it would inconvenience her singing business if she was to go to the fields. The magistrate was unconvinced by Baker's claims of illness and determined that the medical certificate was provided to avoid attending the fields. Hence, the court decided to find against Baker.

When Baker left Western Australia in 1907 to go back to Sydney she had built a solid reputation, with the Bunbury Herald describing her as "perhaps the best mezzo soprano vocalist in the state." Years later her achievements and performances in Sydney were reported in the West Australian press. Hall, her estranged husband, had been living in Western Australia by that time. Despite Baker not arriving in Perth with him nor living with him, the Truth reported that "there seemed no regret for 'the man she had left behind her.'"

== Return to Sydney ==
Baker returned to Sydney in December 1907, and her first reappearance in the city was for the Highland Society early in the following year. She formed a new juvenile choir at Nicolson and Co., a piano importer in George St, Sydney. By February 1908 she had enrolled over 60 students, and their first concert in mid-year was a benefit for Perth Children's Hospital, where they raised over AU£42. By March of that year she had re-commenced teaching singing to young students, in Marrickville, with the first concert on 19 June 1908 at St James Hall, in Phillip Street, Sydney. From this time that she became known as Madame Ada Baker, its earliest known press reference was in The Sunday Times in August 1908.

Baker arranged music for and led the St Cecilia Ladies' Choir in Pymble, where she raised AU£1000 for the local branch of the British Red Cross Society during World War I. The Sydney Morning Herald said that "Madame Ada Baker's Pymble Cecilia Ladles' Choir can fairly claim to be the original 'All-Girl' Patriotic Entertainers." The choir performed a variety of concerts, including the play The Princess of Poppyland, by C. King Proctor, (Note: The Catalog of Copyright Entries on musical compositions notes that C. King Proctor was the pseudonym of Arthur Morton Powell, see "Renewals". Catalog of Copyright Entries: Musical compositions. 1. Vol. 32. Library of Congress Copyright Office. 1938. p. 385.) and the cantata The Hours, by Shapcott Wensley.

Baker was a prolific fund-raiser, including for the Sydney Hospital, the Protestant Orphan's Fair, the Callan Park Hospital for the Insane, the Sydney Mission to Seamen, the Sydney Night Refuge for destitute men, and the Royal Alexandra Hospital for Children. Baker's enthusiasm when raising funds for the Rachel Forster Hospital had her made a life governor of the hospital in 1927. From 1925 to 1932 she raised AU£500 for a permanent cot, and in 1932 she raised a further AU£140 for that hospital.

Baker also arranged and performed in numerous concerts, recitals and eisteddfods, including a performance of Stephen Vost Janssen's concert The Rajah's Ruby (1921) and operetta The Lucky Dream (1930), Arthur A. Penn's light comic opera In Old Havana (1928) and The China Shop (1937), Suppé's opera Boccaccio (1933), Paul Lacôme's opéra comique Ma Mie Rosette (1935), and Robert Planquette's opéra comique Les Cloches de Corneville (1939). Starting in mid-1925, Baker arranged radio programmes and had her juvenile students broadcast over the medium, chiefly on 2FC.

== Later life ==
Ada Baker Street in Forde, ACT was named after the singer.

Baker continued working throughout her life and remained involved in teaching children to sing. In March 1933 she was elected to the executive of the Australian Music Teachers' Alliance and on 25 November was elected vice-president. She was re-elected to this position in 1934 and 1935. She gave two lectures for the alliance: the first in July 1934 was "The Training of Children's Voices" and the second, in August 1938, was on English music of the sixteenth to the eighteenth centuries. By 1939 she had become an active member of the Nothing Under Seventy club, whose members were seventy years of age and above, regularly performing and undertaking charity work with other members.

She continued to raise funds for charity. In 1945, after one of her grandchildren died while serving in the Royal Air Force, she set-up the "Grandmothers' Victory Bond League" to fund Australians in World War II. This, she said, would "give grandmothers a chance to do what they can to help fill the Third Victory Loan." Baker worked till she was 82, but retired after she was injured in a motor vehicle accident.

Upon her retirement, over 60 past and present students arranged a testimonial concert at Sydney Town Hall on 14 July 1949, but Baker was too ill to attend. She died at her Pymble home on 24 July 1949. Services were held at St. Swithen's Church in Pymble, and she was interred at Northern Suburbs Crematorium. Ada Baker Street in Forde, Australian Capital Territory was named in her honour in 2006.
