= Stuart Inder =

Australian journalist, publisher, and editor

Stuart Gerald Inder, MBE (7 November 1926 – 30 January 2015) was an Australian journalist, publisher, and editor. He specialized in the news and current events of the Pacific Islands and Papua New Guinea for more than sixty years.

== Life ==
Stuart Inder was born on 7 November 1926. He joined the Australian military as a journalist in Japan and Korea during the late 1940s.

Inder began his career as a reporter for ABC News, based in Port Moresby, Territory of Papua and New Guinea, during the early 1950s.

Inder, a resident of Wahroonga and former resident of Turramurra, died on 30 January 2015, at the age of 88. He was survived by his wife, Jo, and their children, Lesley, David and Stephanie. His funeral was held at the North Chapel of the Northern Suburbs Crematorium, Sydney, on 9 February 2015.

== Work ==
=== Pacific Publications ===
During the 1950s, Inder joined the staff of Pacific Publications, which owned and published the Fiji Times and the Pacific Islands Monthly (PIM). The publication was founded by Robert William "Robbie" Robson in August 1930. PIM became popular with universities worldwide for their Pacific Island studies collections, as well as businesspeople and farmers in the region. Inder and his colleague, Judy Tudor, served as the co-editors of Pacific Islands Monthly (PIM) from November 1957 until November 1964. He then became the only editor of PIM from November 1964 until October 1975. PIM increased in popularity, leading to more letters and guests at the newsroom in Sydney than the staff could keep up with. In response, Inder and Robson instituted a policy allowing visitors on Thursdays.

Robson later sold the Fiji Times and the Pacific Islands Monthly Herald and Weekly Times Group. Following the sale, Inder remained as PIM's editor until October 1975, when he was succeeded as editor by Angus Smales, a longtime journalist for the Herald and Weekly Times Papua New Guinea. Inder then served as PIM's publisher from October 1975 to August 1980. During this time, Inder also took over the role of editor for PIM's Pacific Islands Year Book from Judy Tudor during this time. Pacific Islands Monthly ended its publications in June 2000 after nearly seven decades. Despite PIM's closure, Inder continued to hold his monthly Pacific Islands Monthly Lunch, which he started during the mid-1960s. The lunches meet on the first Friday of each month at the Law Society restaurant in Phillip Street, Sydney. Notable guests of Inder's Pacific Islands Monthly Lunch include former Prime Minister of Papua New Guinea Michael Somare, the first President of Nauru Hammer DeRoburt, and former President of Fiji Kamisese Mara. The Pacific Islands Monthly Lunch remains one of Sydney's longest running professional lunch series, as of 2015.

=== The Bulletin ===
Inder became a Pacific affairs writer for The Bulletin following his departure from PIM. Dick Smith, an Australian entrepreneur and founder of Australian Geographic, hired Inder as the editor of many of his magazines, books and other publications, including Australian Geographic. Inder also worked as a guest lecturer on the Pacific Islands for cruise lines, businesses and other organizations. In one instance, Inder became ill which lecturing on a cruise ship anchored off Rarotonga, Cook Islands. The then Prime Minister of the Cook Islands, Tom Davis, sailed out to the ship to visit Inder.

=== Tales of Papua New Guinea ===
Inder edited Tales of Papua New Guinea, which was published by Papua New Guinea Association of Australia in 2001.
