= Northern Suburbs General Cemetery Reserve Trust v Commonwealth =

Judgement of the High Court of Australia

- Court: High Court of Australia
- Full case name: Northern Suburbs General Cemetery Reserve Trust v The Commonwealth of Australia
- Decided: 11 March 1993
- Citations: [1993] HCA 12, (1993) 176 CLR 555

Court membership
- Judges sitting: Mason CJ, Brennan, Deane, Dawson, Toohey, Gaudron and McHugh JJ

Case opinions
- (7:0) The Training Guarantee Act 1990 and the Training Guarantee (Administration) Act 1990 are valid under the taxation power

Northern Suburbs General Cemetery Reserve Trust v Commonwealth, is a High Court of Australia case that considered the scope of the taxation power.

== Facts ==
Two Commonwealth Acts, the Training Guarantee Act 1990 and the Training Guarantee (Administration) Act 1990 mandated a minimum amount an employer had to spend training their workforce. Further, employers had to pay any shortfall in the amount that had to be spent in training and the actual amount to the government. Northern Suburbs General Cemetery Reserve Trust did not spend the minimum amount, and had to pay the difference to the government. They argued the Act was unconstitutional because it was not a valid law with respect to taxation. If the laws achieved their purpose, then no revenue would actually be collected by the Commonwealth. Further, looking at the statements of objectives of the Acts, raising revenue was not an objective.

== Decision ==
Per Mason CJ, Deane, Toohey and Gaudron JJ:

The laws were made pursuant to the taxation power. Although revenue raising was not a stated objective, it intrinsically was an objective of the Acts. More importantly, if a law on its face is one with respect to taxation, the law does not cease to have that character simply because parliament seeks to achieve a purpose not within Commonwealth power.

The plaintiffs argued that the money paid was not a tax but a fee for services. The court held that it was not a fee for services because the connection between the service and the fee was too remote. The court could not determine for what service the fee was paid.

== See also ==
- Constitutional basis of taxation in Australia
- Australian constitutional law
